= Leoni =

Leoni is an Italian surname, literally meaning "lions". Notable people with this surname include:

== People ==
- Pier Leoni (died 1128), son of the Jewish convert Leo de Benedicto and founder of the Roman family of the Pierleoni
- Jacob Jehudah Leoni (1603-1675), Jewish Dutch scholar, translator of the Psalms, and expert on heraldry, of Sephardic descent
- Adolfo Leoni (1917—1970), Italian professional road bicycle racer
- Anilza Leoni (1933–2009), Brazilian actress, singer, ballerina and painter, of Italian descent
- Atossa Leoni (born 1977), German actress
- Bruno Leoni (1913–1967), Italian political philosopher (classical liberalism) and lawyer
- Carlo Leoni (historian) (1812–1872), Italian historian and epigraphist
- Carlos Leoni, founder and former member of the Brazilian pop-rock band Kid Abelha
- Carlo Leoni (politician) (born 1955), Italian politician
- David Leoni (born 1982), English Olympic Games biathlete
- Demetris Leoni (born 1977), Cypriot retired goalkeeper and goalkeeping coach
- Dindigul I. Leoni (born 1954), Indian school teacher, orator, social debates anchor
- Domenico Leoni, magister militum of Venice in 737, of Byzantine origin
- Elio Leoni Sceti (born 1966), Italian businessman and an investor in early-stage companies
- Endrio Leoni (born 1968), Italian road bicycle racer
- Ezio Leoni (1927-2015), "Maestro", Italian composer, arranger, orchestra conductor, producer and A&R Executive
- Franco Leoni (1864–1949), Italian opera composer (L'Oracolo)
- Frank Leoni (born 1968), American college baseball coach
- Giacomo Leoni (1686–1746), Italian architect, also known as James Leoni
- Gianni Leoni, Italian motorcycle racer
- Giorgio Leoni (born 1950), Sammarinese professional football manager
- Giovanni Leoni (born 2006), Italian professional football player
- Giovanni Antonio Leoni (17th century), Roman violinist and composer
- Guido Leoni (1915-1951), Italian Grand Prix motorcycle road racer
- Guglielmo da Leoni (1664–c. 1740), Italian painter and engraver
- Johnny Leoni (born 1984), Swiss goalkeeper football player
- Kerrin Leoni (born 1979 or 1980), New Zealand politician
- Lamberto Leoni (born 1953), former racing driver from Italy
- Leone Leoni (1509–1590), Italian Renaissance sculptor and medallist (or his son Pompeo)
- Leone Leoni (composer) (c. 1560 – 1627), Italian composer and Maestro di cappella
- Lodovico Leoni (1531–1606), Italian painter, mainly active in Rome
- Matheus Leoni (born 1991), Brazilian defender football player
- Michael Leoni, (c. 1750–1797) stage name of Myer Lyon, English-German-Jewish tenor singer
- Lodovico Leoni (1531–1606), Italian painter, father of
- Ottavio Leoni (1578–1630), Italian painter, son of Lodovico
- Nestore Leoni (1862–1947), Italian painter and illuminator of manuscripts (miniatore)
- Neva Leoni (born 1992), Italian actress
- Paolo Leoni (died 1590), Roman Catholic Bishop of Ferrara
- Pier Leoni, Medieval Roman consul
- Pietro Leoni (1909–1995), Jesuit priest from Italy who later worked in the Soviet Union
- Pietro Leoni (bishop) (1637–1697). Roman Catholic Bishop of Ceneda (1667–1691) and Bishop of Verona
- Raúl Leoni (1905–1972), President of Venezuela from 1964 until 1969, of Italian descent
- Roberto Leoni, Italian screenwriter and film director
- Stéphane Léoni (born 1976), French former footballer
- Téa Leoni (born 1966), American actress of Italian descent
- Théo Leoni (born 2000), Belgian footballer
- Tommaso Leoni (born 1991), Italian snowboarder, specializing in snowboard cross

== See also ==
- Leoni Jansen, Dutch singer and stage-director
- Leoni Franco (born 1942), Uruguayan musician, composer, and guitarist
- Leone (disambiguation)
