= Hickford's Long Room =

Former public concert room in London

Coordinates: 51.511°N 0.136°W

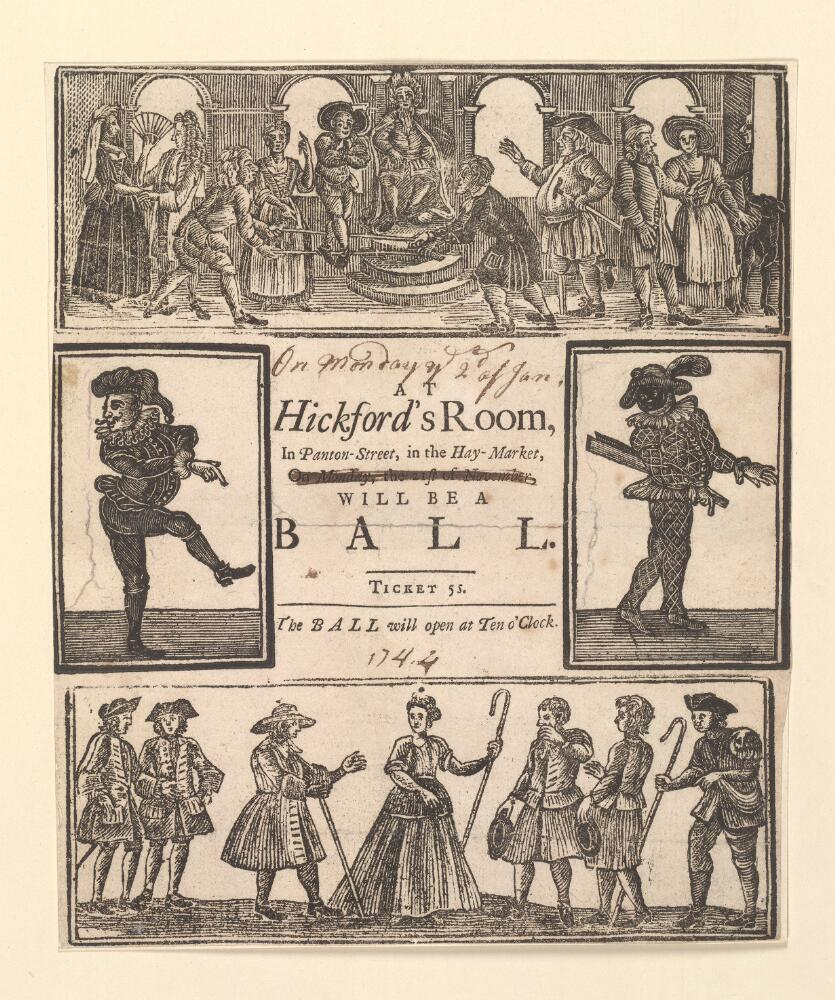
As well as a concert venue, Hickford's was also at times the host of dances.

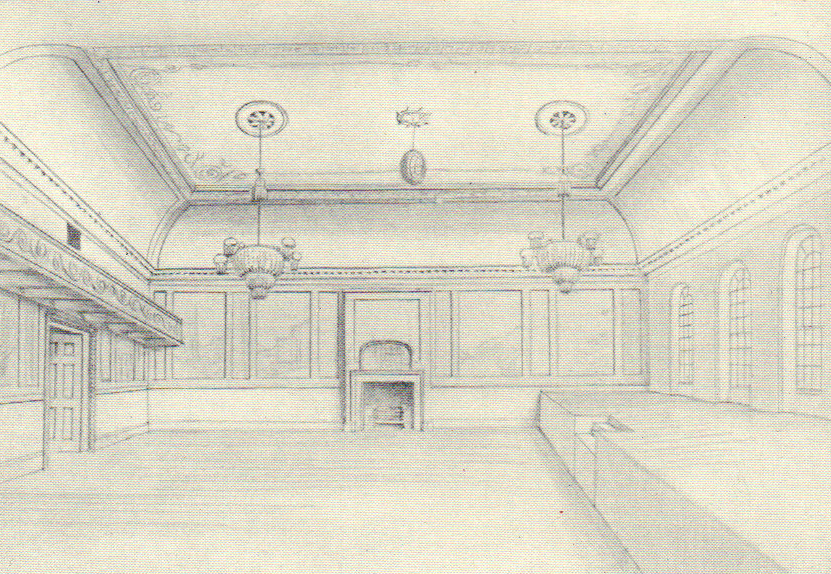
Hickford's Long Room at Brewer Street, 1878, showing the coved ceiling and window for the gallery above the door.

Hickford's Long Room was a public concert room in London, which ran from April 1713 until 1787; it became known as Rice's Rooms from 1788. Harrison's date of 1779 is not correct. It was paid for on a subscription basis to those who could afford to patronize the arts, such as the nobility. The 1922 Groves noted that "most of the great performers, both vocal and instrumental, who visited England, gave their concerts there." The room became a place to see successful musicians play, including Francesco Scarlatti (1719 & 1724), Francesco Geminiani (c. 1732), Gluck in 1746, Mozart (1765), Francesco Maria Veracini, Pietro Castrucci and Matthew Dubourg. For a time in the 1740s and 50s, it was the only concert room of note in the West End of London.

== John Hickford ==
A 1922 source reports that "little is known" of the venue's founder, John Hickford. He was a "dancing-master in the latter part Queen Anne's reign", and his room was one of two in the west end of London with sufficient room for concerts. As artists approached him to use his room, he developed a reputation as a concert-organizing agent. His establishment was known by a variety of names at different times, including Mr. Hickford's Dancing School and Mr. Hickford's Great Dancing Room. Later as it became a concert venue, it was called Mr. Hickford's Great Room and Mr. Hickford's Room.

== Programme ==
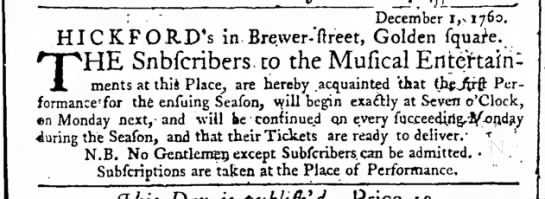
Advertisement from Dec. 1760 announcing start of concert season at Hickford's in London.

There were 20 concerts a season, running from December to April. A season ticket (or "subscription") cost 4 guineas, about 44 days wages for a skilled tradesman. Non-ticket holders paid half a guinea (6-days' wages) to attend a show if space was available. A ticket-holder could arrange to bring a friend, with a charge of 5 shillings (2-days' wages) for each of them.

The regular band was led by Michael Christian Festing, with singer Cecilia Young (known publicly as "Mrs. Arne") and cello played by Andrea Caporale (who played for Handel in 1740).

In addition to the house's seasonal shows, benefits concerts were held for musicians, with other musicians supporting them with their music. An example of this was the benefit for mandolin virtuoso Gabriele Leone, March 17, 1766. The beneficiary, Leone, performed one of his own pieces, as well as one from Emanuele Barbella. He had help from composer Mattia Vento, who directed the concert. Also part of the concert was violinist composer François-Hippolyte Barthélémon and his soon-to-be wife, soprano Polly Young, Joseph Tacet (who was a master of the German flute), the Brothers Colla (playing colascione)s, Spanish violinist Oliver (whose patron was the Earl of Abingdon) and cellist Giovanni Battista Cirri.

== Location ==
The Long Room was located first on James Street in Haymarket, across from the Royal Tennis Courts); it was expanded and grew to have a second entrance on Panton Street. As Mr. Hickford became successful, he moved his establishment, in 1739, to Brewer Street near Golden Square, "a fashionable part of town." The latter location featured a room 50 feet by 30 feet, lit by a large window on the southern side, with a high coved ceiling and decorative cornices and mouldings. It had a small stage and a gallery above the door. It is unclear whether Hickford had the new room built, or whether he took over an existing space.

The room stood behind No. 41 Brewer Street until its demolition in 1934 as part of the expansion of the Regent Palace Hotel. The Encyclopaedia Britannica described the demolition as having a "deplorable disregard of its unique interest and historical associations".

== Gallery ==
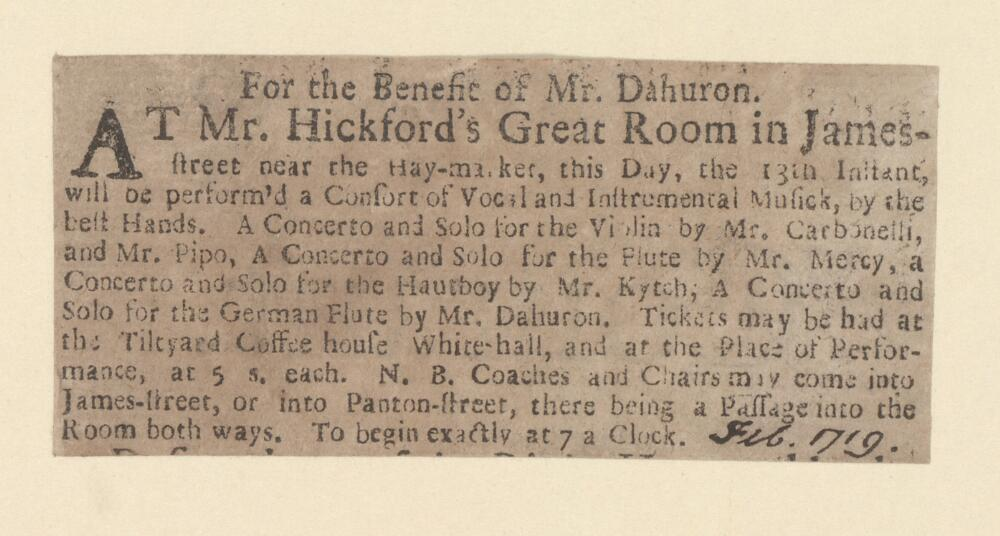
1719, Feb. Advertisement announcing Vocal and instrumental music for the benefit of Mr. Dahuron. Entrances on both James Street and Panton Street.

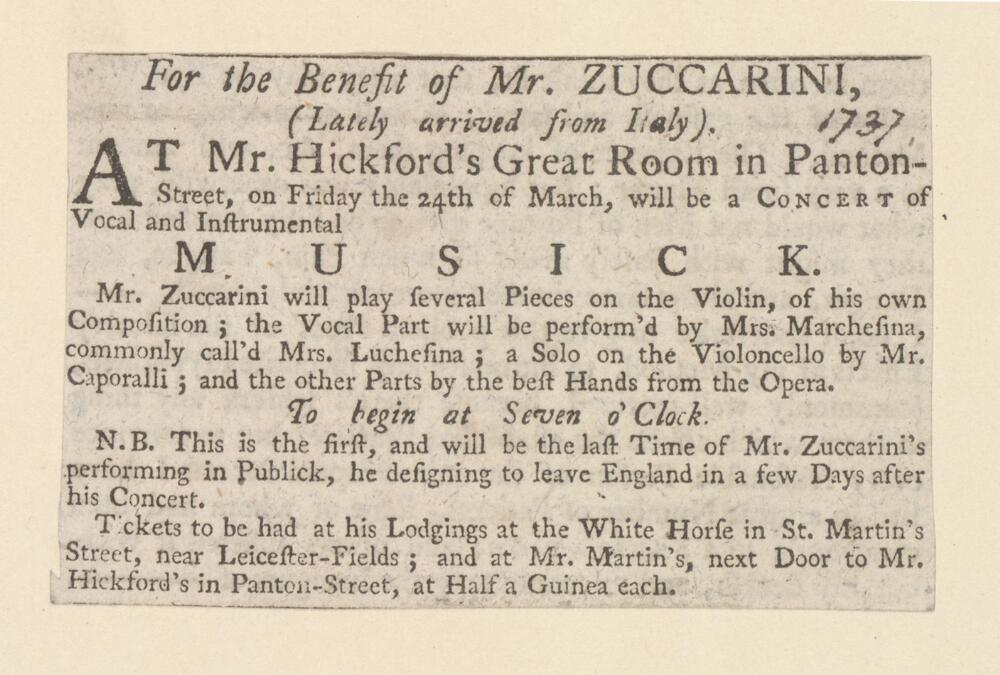
1737. Announcement of March 1737 concert for violinist, Mr. Zuccarini.

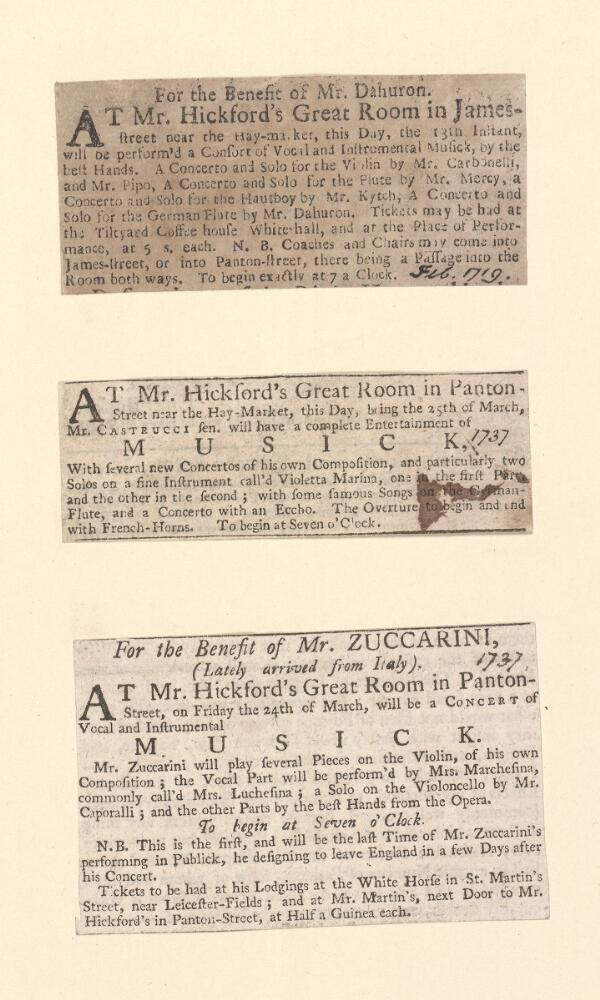
1737, March 25. Advertisements for Hickford's Great Room on Panton Street, about two years before the move to the Brewer Street location.

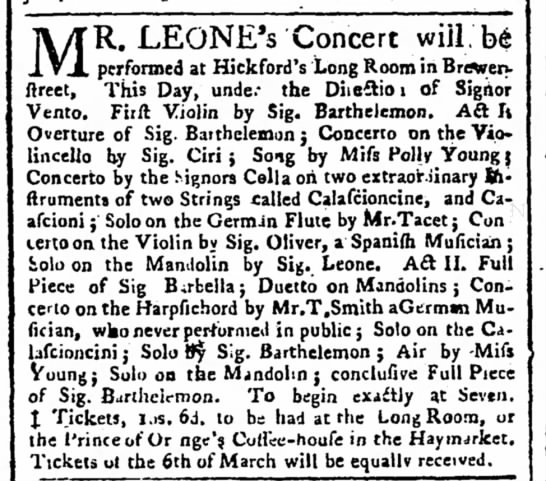
1766, March 17. Benefit concert Advertisement for Gabriele Leone at Hickford's Long Room.

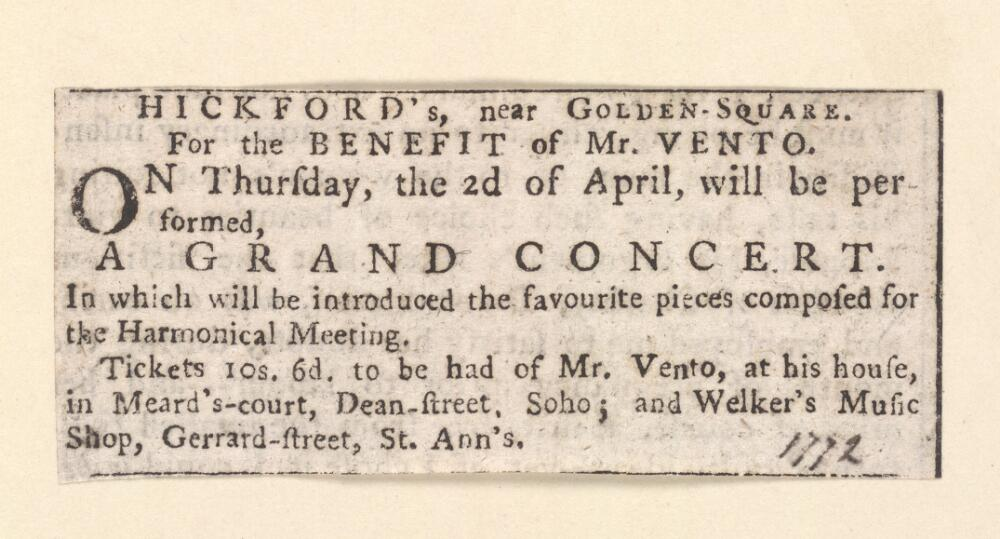
1772, April 2. Newscutting relating to Hickford's, announcing A grand concert for the benefit of Mr. Vento; Grand concert; Hickford's near Golden Square

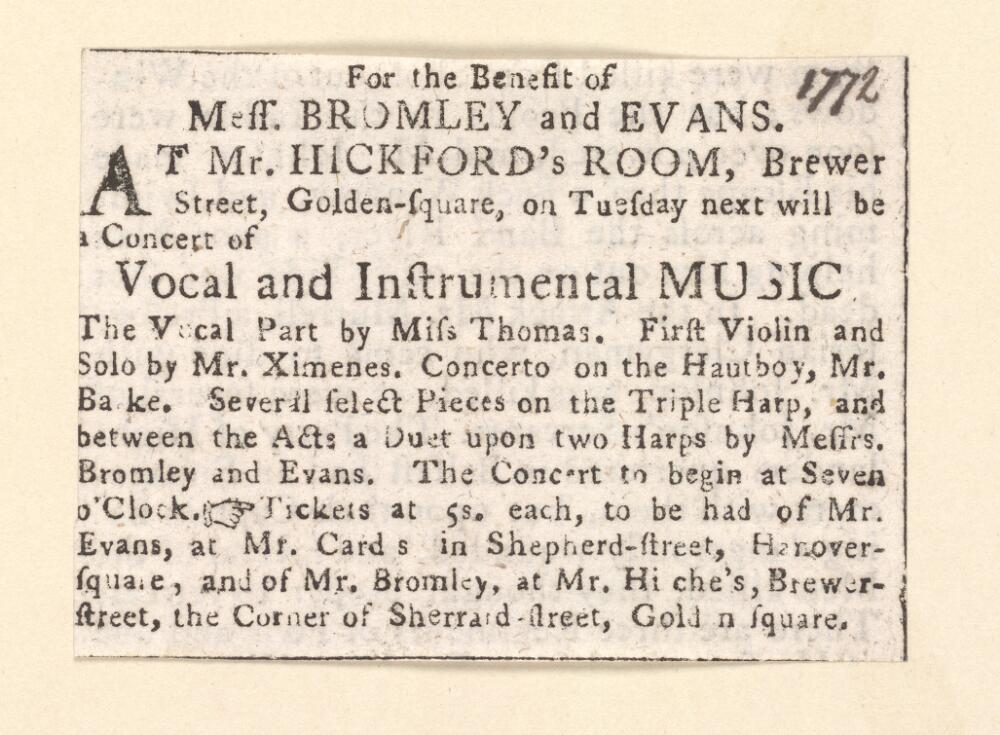
1772. Concert for the benefit of Mr. Bromley; Vocal part by Miss Thomas; First violin and solo by Mr. Ximenes; Concerto on the hautboy; Several select pieces on the harp; Duet upon two harps by Messrs. Bromley and Evans.

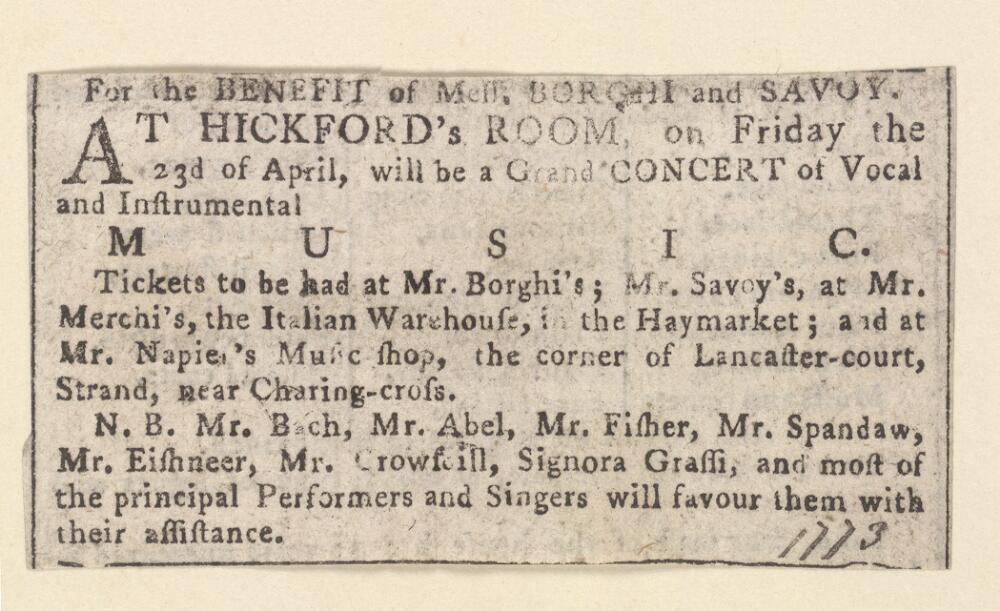
1773. Concert for the benefit of Mess. Borghi and Savoy.

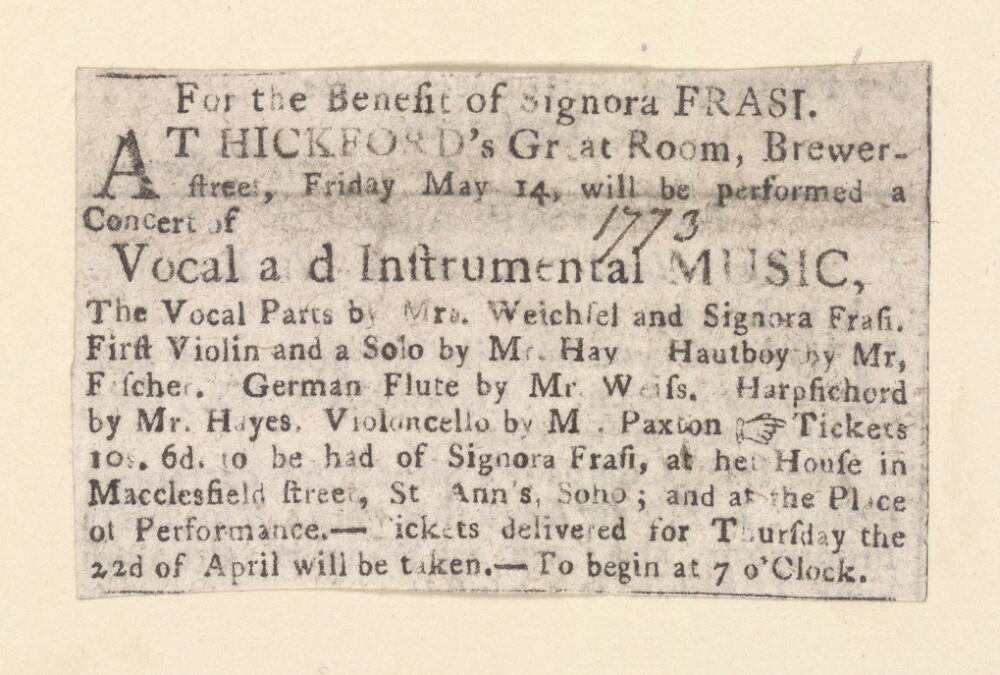
1773, May 14. Concert for the benefit of Signora Frasi.

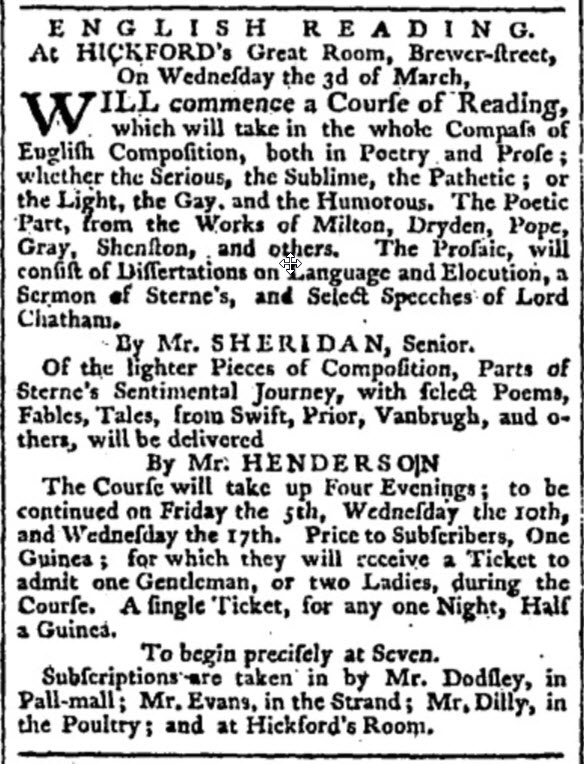
1784, February 21. Advertisement for a Course of Reading.

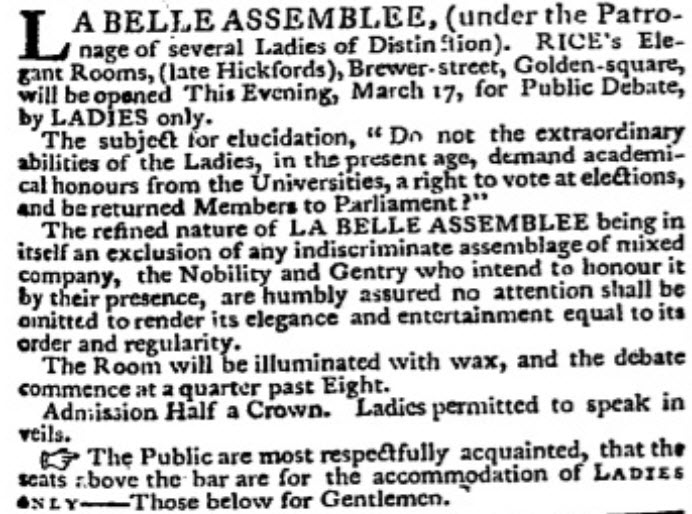
1788, March 17. Early advertisement for newly-named Rice's Rooms (formerly Hickford's)

== Bibliography ==
- Harrison, Bertha (1 September 1906a). "A Forgotten Concert Room". The Musical Times. Vol. 47. London. pp. 602–605.
- Harrison, Bertha (1 October 1906b). "A Forgotten Concert Room (continued)". The Musical Times. Vol. 47. London. pp. 669–672.
- Harrison, Bertha (1922). Maitland, J. A. Fuller (ed.). Grove's Dictionary of Music and Musicians. Philadelphia, Pennsylvania: Theodore Presser Company. p. 393-396. "hickford's long room."
