= Leoni (disambiguation) =

Leoni is an Italian surname.

Leoni may also refer to:

== Places ==
- Porta Leoni, an ancient Roman gate in Verona, northern Italy
- Puerto Leoni, a municipality in Misiones Province in north-eastern Argentina
- Leoni Township, Michigan
- Leoni (Bavaria) (formerly Assenbuch) in Bavaria

== Buildings ==
- Palazzo Leoni, Bologna, Renaissance style palace, in central Bologna, Italy
- Palazzo Marcello dei Leoni, between the Rio di San Tomà e Palazzo Dolfin, in the sestiere di San Polo, Venice, Italy
- Palazzo Leoni Montanari, Vicenza, late Baroque palace located in Contra’ San Corona in central Vicenza, Italy

== Other uses ==
- Leoni (film)
- Leoni Leo, 1917 Hungarian adventure film directed by Alfréd Deésy
- "Leoni", the standard setting for the hymn The God of Abraham Praise
- Leoni Cables, formerly Leonische Drahtwerke, cable firm from Germany

== See also ==
- Leone (disambiguation)
