= Gabriele Leone =

Italian composer

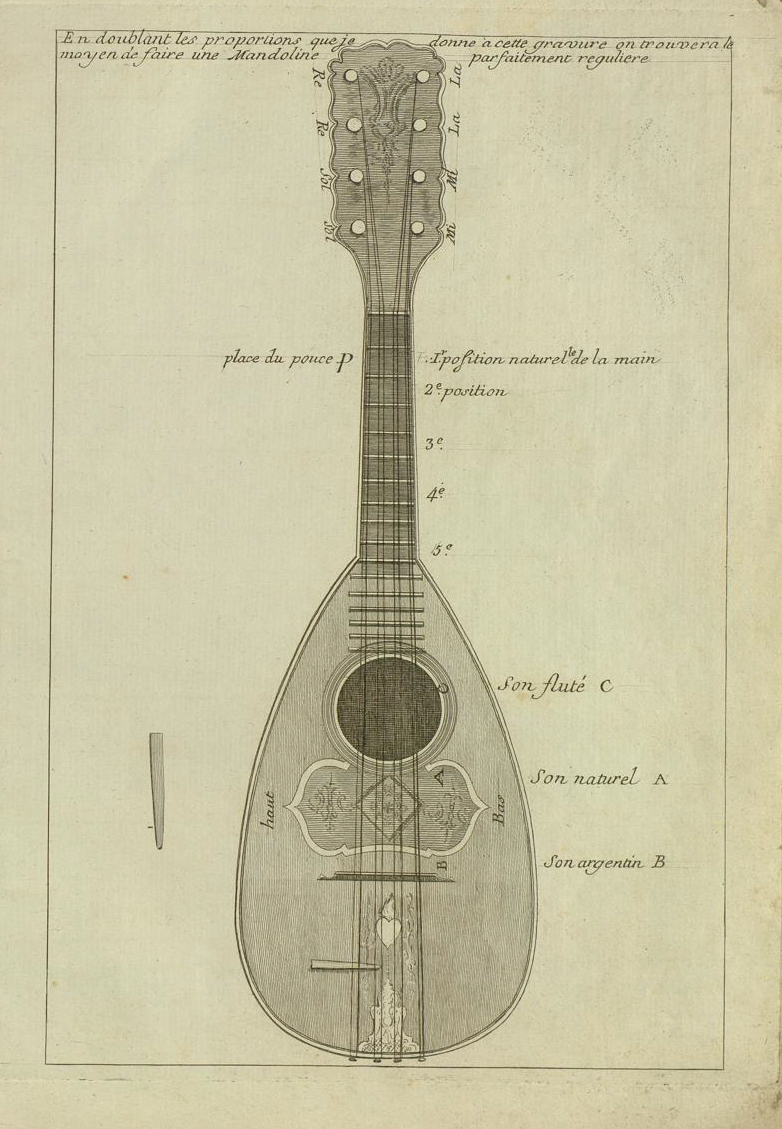
Picture from Analytical method for mastering the violin or the mandolin by Gabriele Leon, published 1768. The page gave information for tuning the mandolin, hand positions on the neck and places near the soundhole to use the plectrum.

Gabriele Leone (born Naples c. 1735 – 1790) was an Italian musician and composer who lived in Paris during the middle and later part of the 18th century. A virtuoso on the violin and mandolin, he wrote an early mandolin method, Analytical method for mastering the violin or the mandolin in 1768 and composed for both instruments. He was an early teacher of the duo method, an advanced technique which would reappear in the 20th century, taught by Giuseppe Pettine in the United States.

In the 1700s, the mandolin spread across Europe for the first time, through performances by masters of the instrument. Leone was one of those early masters who spread the mandolin in Europe, giving concerts and teaching. He spent time in London (1762–1763) as director of the London Opera before returning to Paris where he performed at the Concert Spirituel from 1760 to 1766. One of his students was Louis Philippe II, Duke of Orléans, the father of King Louis Philippe I (the last French king).

== Works ==
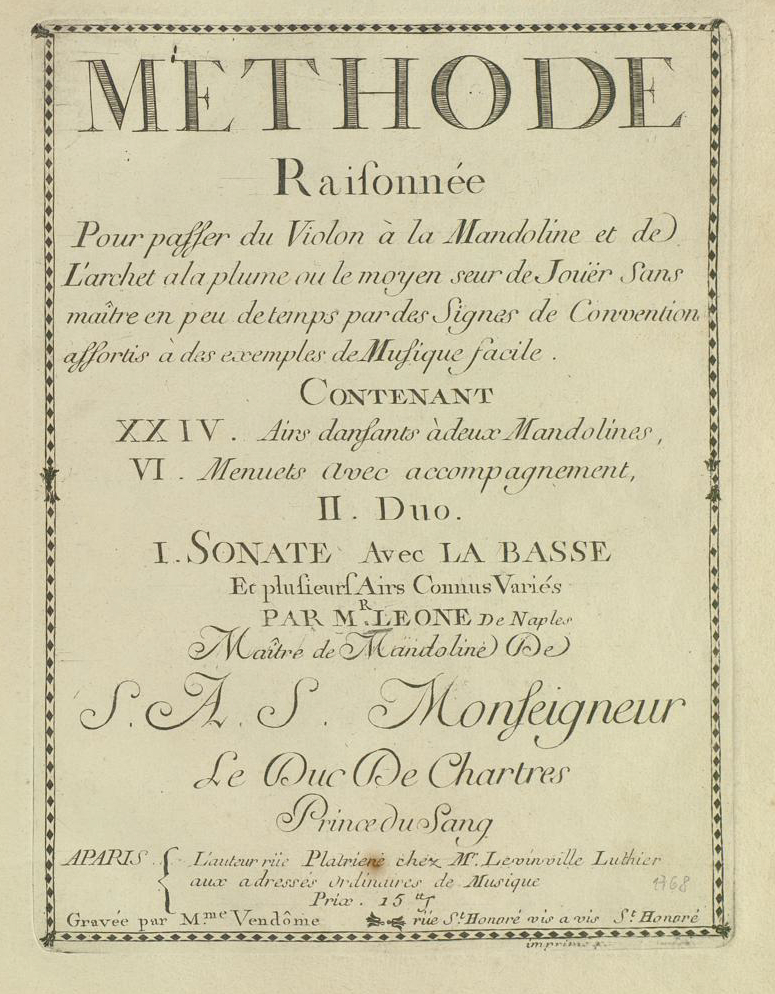
Title page from Analytical method for mastering the violin or the mandolin. Identifies himself on the page as "Master of the Mandolin to the Duke of Chartres" (Louis Philippe II, Duke of Orléans).

He referred to himself on the covers of his works as M^{r} Leone de Naple (Monsieur Leone of Naples).

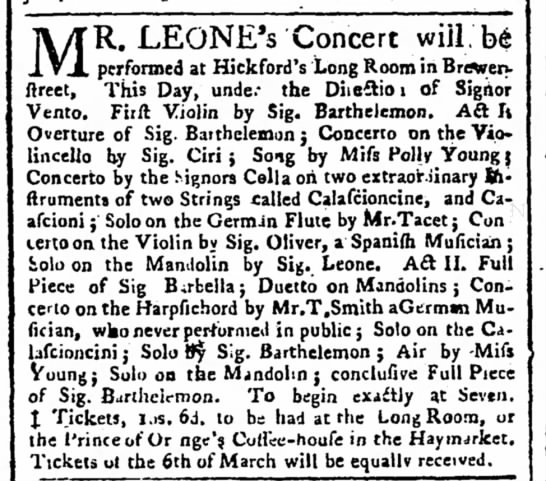
Concert Advertisement for London concert at Hickford's Long Room with Gabriele Leone, March 17, 1766 in London. Leone performed one of his own pieces, as well as one from Emanuele Barbella. Composer Mattia Vento directed the concert. Also part of the concert was violinist composer François-Hippolyte Barthélémon and his wife, singer Polly Young, and the Brothers Colla who played colasciones.

His mandolin method was meant to help students of the violin switch to the mandolin, "from bow to feather" without the need for a teacher, using sheet music marked with "conventional signs" to guide learners. Feathers were used as plectrums in that era, as they had been when playing the mandore. The method contained 26 dancing tunes, 6 minuets, 2 duos, a sonata and some airs.

=== Books ===
- 1768, Paris, Méthode raisonnée pour passer du Violon à la Mandoline (Analytical method for mastering the violin or the mandolin)

=== Music ===
- 1767, Paris, 6 Sonates pour mandoline et basse continue, Livre 1 opus 1 (6 Sonatas for mandolin and basso continuo, Book 1 opus 1)
- 1770, Paris and Lyon, Six sonates de mandoline et basse marquées des signes suivant la nouvelle méthode opus 2 (Six sonatas of mandolin and bass marked with signs according to the new method opus 2)
- 1772, Paris, [6] Duo pour deux violons qui peuvent se jouer sur la mandoline et sur le par-dessus [de viole] (6 Duets for two violins that can be played on the mandolin and descant [viol])

== Recordings ==
- 2015 Leone: Six sonates pour la mandoline et basse, Livre I, played by Maria Lucia Barros, Florentino Calvo, Ana Yepes
