= Carlo Leoni =

Carlo Leoni may refer to:

- Carlo Leoni (historian) (1812–1872), Italian historian and epigraphist
- Carlo Leoni (politician) (born 1955), Italian politician
