= Leoncio =

Leoncio or Leôncio is a given name. Notable people with the name include:

- Leoncio Afonso, (born 1916), Spanish academic in the geography, history and toponymics of the Canary Islands
- Ricardo Leoncio Elías Arias (1874–1951), Peruvian soldier and politician, briefly President of Peru from March 1–5, 1931
- Leoncio Basbaum or Leôncio Basbaum (1907–1969), Brazilian Marxist historian
- Leoncio P. Deriada, Filipino writer
- Leoncio Evita Enoy (1929–1996), intellectual, painter and writer from Equatorial Guinea
- Leoncio Prado Gutiérrez (1853–1883), Peruvian mariner
- Leoncio Lara (best known as Leoncio Lara 'Bon') is a Mexican composer and former rock band member
- Bárbara Leôncio (born 1991), young Brazilian athlete, world champion in the 200 metres in 2007
- Carlos Leôncio de Magalhães (1875–1931), Brazilian farmer and businessman
- Leoncio Morán Sánchez (born 1966), Mexican politician from the National Action Party
- Leoncio Alonso González de Gregorio, 22nd Duke of Medina Sidonia (born 1956), Spanish aristocrat and historian
- Leoncio Vidal (1864–1896), Cuban revolutionary that fought in the Cuban War of Independence
- the Spanish name of the animated character Lippy the Lion

== See also ==
- Leoncio Prado Military Academy, Peruvian educational institution founded in 1943
- Leoncio Prado Province, one of eleven provinces of the Huánuco Region in Peru
- Leoncio Prado District, Huaura, one of twelve districts of the province Huaura in Peru
- Leoncio Prado District, Lucanas, one of twenty-one districts of the province Lucanas in Peru
- Leon (disambiguation)
- Leoncito (disambiguation)
- Leoni (disambiguation)
- Leono

Leoncio Mavuduru Sibeko Born 19.10.2010 far east hospital home 96 Benue rive chief albert luthuli Park Benoni
