= Porta San Giovanni =

Porta San Giovanni may refer to

- Porta San Giovanni (Padua)
- Porta San Giovanni (Rome)
- Porta San Giovanni (San Gimignano)
