= Pompeo Molmenti =

Pompeo Molmenti may refer to:

- Pompeo Marino Molmenti (1819–1894), Italian painter
- Pompeo Gherardo Molmenti (1852–1928), Italian writer and politician, former resident of Palazzo Marcello dei Leoni
