= Leone =

Leone is a given name and a surname. Notable people with the name include:

== Given name ==
- Leone Battista Alberti (1404–1472), Italian Renaissance humanist polymath
- Léone Boudreau-Nelson (1915-2004), American-born Canadian phonetician
- Leone Caetani (1869–1935), Italian politician
- Leone de' Sommi (c. 1525 – c. 1590), Italian writer
- Leone N. Farrell (1904–1986), Canadian biochemist and microbiologist
- Leone Ginzburg (1909–1944), Italian journalist
- Leone Leoni (1509–1590), Italian Renaissance sculptor and medallist
- Léone-Noëlle Meyer (born 1939), French businesswoman and philanthropist
- Leone Minassian (1905–1978), Ottoman Empire-born Italian painter of Armenian descent
- Leone Nakarawa (b.1988), Fijian rugby union player
- Leone Ross (b. 1969), British writer, editor, journalist and academic
- Leone Sforza (1406–1440), Italian condottiero
- Leone Strozzi (1515–1554), Italian condottiero

== Surname ==
- Brad Leone (b. 1985), American chef and YouTube personality
- Carl Leone (b. 1976), Canadian businessman and criminal
- Cinzia Leone (b. 1959), Italian actress and comedian.
- Dominic Leone (born 1990), American baseball player
- Douglas Leone (b. 1957), American billionaire venture capitalist
- Fred C. Leone (1922–2016), American statistician
- Gabriele Leone (c.1735–1790) Italian mandolin virtuoso
- Giacomo Leone (b. 1971), Italian long-distance runner
- Giovanni Leone (1908–2001), Italian politician who served as president and prime minister
- Giuseppina Leone (b. 1971), Italian athlete
- Jason Leone, former drummer for Michigan heavy metal band Battlecross
- Matthew Leone (b. 1981), bassist of Madina Lake and twin of Nathan Leone
- Miriam Leone (b. 1985), Italian television personality and beauty pageant titleholder
- Nathan Leone (b. 1981), lead singer of Madina Lake and twin of Matthew Leone
- Raffaella Leone (born 1961 or 1962), Italian film producer
- Richard Leone (1940–2015), American politician
- Rob Leone, (b. 1976), Canadian politician
- Sergio Leone (1929–1989), Italian film director
- Sunny Leone (b. 1981), Indo-Canadian model and actress

=== De Leone, Di Leone ===
- Andrea di Leone, Italian painter
- Francesco Bartolomeo de Leone
- Guido Di Leone (1964–2025), Italian jazz guitarist

== Fictional characters ==
- Leone, a character in the opera Tamerlano of Handel
- Leone-class destroyer an Italian Navy destroyer class
- Leone, a character in the manga and anime series Akame ga Kill!
- Leone Abbacchio, an ex-police officer and main character in the manga and anime series JoJo’s Bizarre Adventure: Golden Wind
- The Leone Crime Family, a fictional Italian American mafia from GTA III and GTA Liberty City Stories
