= Coved ceiling =

Ceiling with a large concave curve at the wall-to-ceiling transition

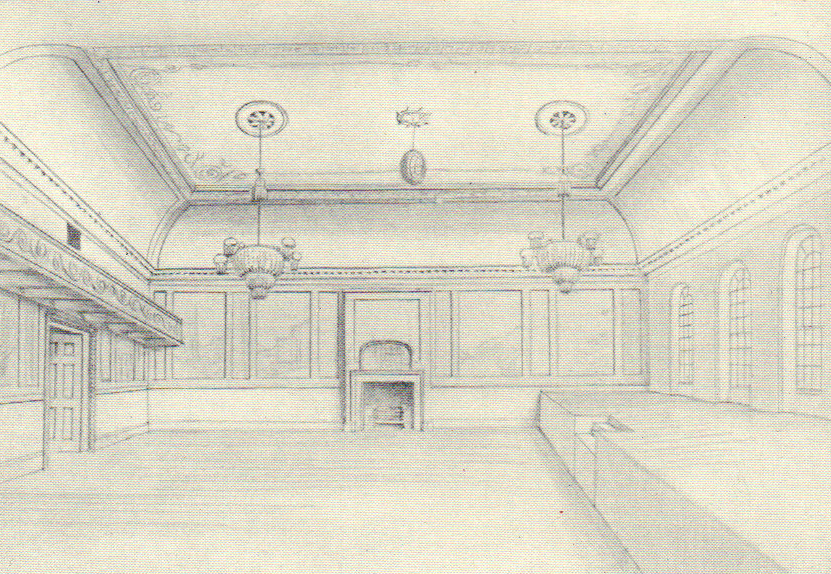
Coved ceiling in Hickford's Long Room, c. 1878

A coved ceiling is a ceiling that has had the visual appearance of the point where the ceiling meets the walls improved by the addition of coving. It can also refer to a ceiling, like in a mosque.
