= Domenico Colla =

18th-century Italian musician

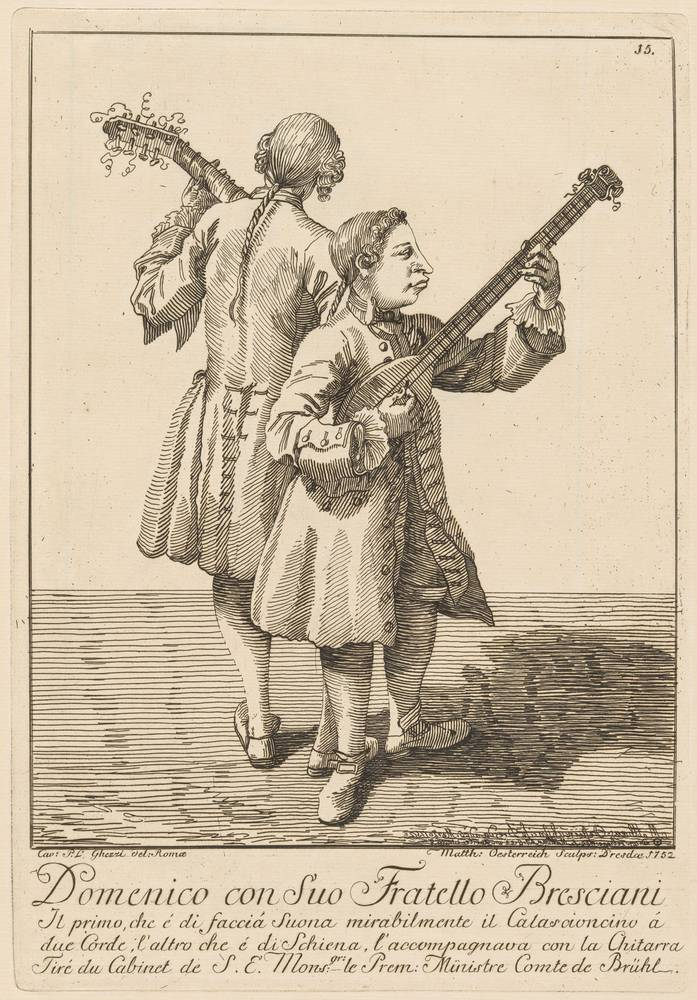
Domenico Colla (front) playing a two string colascioncino, with his brother playing a guitar, c. 1752. Domenico played in Rome during Carnival in 1749 at the Teatro Valle and at a salon or academy hosted by Pier Leone Ghezzi. Ghezzi drew a head and shoulders caricature of him during that trip, and an image of the two brothers playing, which Matthias Oesterreich used to create the published engraving.

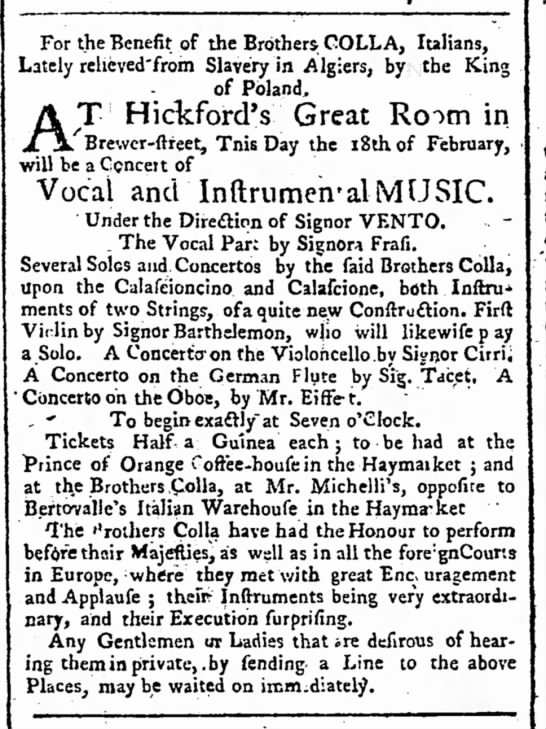
Domenico Colla and his brother performed at Hickford's Long Room in London, shown in a February 1766 advertisement. The brothers' own benefits concert was on February 18, and they also performed in other musicians' benefits concerts, including: March 17, 1766 for Gabriele Leone and April 11, 1766 for Polly Young.

Domenico Colla was an 18th-century Brescian composer and performer who traveled Europe in the 1760s, performing in the most important theaters and salons. Together with his brother Giuseppe, he was one of the Colla brothers. The brothers played in royal circles; they performed before Frederick the Great in 1765 in the palace at Sanssouci. They were in London in 1766, where it was advertised that they had performed before the British royalty, as well as other the royal families of Europe. The brothers were also noted for being survivors of slavery in Algiers, rescued from it by the King of Poland.

The brothers played the colascione and colascioncino and guitar. Domenico's name is attached to six sonatas for the smaller colascioncino.

The colascione was a long-necked lute (strings 100 –130 cm), possibly related to the dutar or tanbur. The colascioncino was tuned an octave higher with strings 50–60 cm long. The instruments can have two or three strings. According to the advertisement, the brothers played the two string variety.

Domenico composed music, and his six sonatas for the colascioncino may be the only works that have survived for that instrument. Each sonata lists either the colascioncino or colascioncino of two strings.

== Works ==
Six Colascioncino Sonatas The sonatas are set up with the colascioncino playing the melody, accompanied by a bass-ranged instrument, the colascione.

- Sonata in G major
- Sonata in G major
- Sonata in D major
- Sonata in E major
- Sonata in E-flat major
- Sonata in F major
