= Pasquale Bini =

Italian violinist and composer (1716–1770)

Pasquale Bini (21 June 1716 – April 1770) was an Italian violinist and composer of the Baroque era. He was a student of Giuseppe Tartini in Padua and later moved to Rome, where he performed under the patronage of Cardinal Fabio degli Abati Olivieri. In 1754, Bini became the concert director and chamber composer at the court of Charles Eugene, Duke of Württemberg. Much of his work has not survived.

== Life ==
Bini was born in Pesaro in 1716; his family were musicians. He was a favourite pupil of Giuseppe Tartini, to whom he was recommended at the age of fifteen by Cardinal Fabio degli Abati Olivieri. and studied with Tartini in Padua for three or four years. On moving to Rome, under the patronage of Cardinal Olivieri, he astonished the violinists by his performance, especially Antonio Montanari, the chief violin-player of the time at Rome, who was generally believed to have died of mortification at the superiority of Bini's talents.

Hearing that Tartini had changed his style of playing, he returned to Padua and placed himself for another year under his old master. He returned to Rome in 1738. Cardinal Olivieri died that year; his second patron, Cardinal Troiano Acquaviva d'Aragona, died in 1747, and he returned to Pesaro. He was appointed in 1754 to the court of Charles Eugene, Duke of Württemberg, as concert director and chamber composer. It is thought he was still there in 1757; he later returned to Pesaro, where he died in 1770.

Emanuele Barbella, and perhaps Luigi Tomasini, were his pupils. Of his compositions, a violin sonata and a violin concerto survives; it is thought much has been lost.
