= Leone (disambiguation) =

Leone is a given name and a surname.

Leone may also refer to:

- Aerfer Leone, undeveloped fighter aircraft
- Leone, American Samoa
- Monte Leone, mountain in the Leone-Gruppe as part of Western Alps
- Pastiglie Leone, maker of candies and lozenges
- Sierra Leone, independent nation in West Africa
- Sierra Leonean leone, currency of Sierra Leone
- Subaru Leone, subcompact car
