= Walls of Padua =

Complex of defensive fortifications surrounding the city of Padua, Italy

The Walls of Padua (Italian: cinta muraria di Padova) are a complex of defensive works around the Italian city of Padua, designed to defend it from hostile attack. It was built in 4 phases.

== Phases ==
=== Roman ===
Of the walls built during the ancient Roman era, the only traces to survive are those incorporated into the foundations of certain palazzi. The route of this wall corresponded to a meander of the river Medoacus (now the Brenta River) in which developed Padua's first urban centre.

=== 13th century ===
The Mura Duecentesche ("13th century walls"; also known as the mura comunali or mura medievali) were built at the start of the 13th century by the Comune of Padua. Their route was delimited by the two branches of the Bacchiglione, the Tronco Maestro and the Naviglio Interno, which came to be used as defensive ditches. There are several remains of them around the Castello and near Porta Molino. More minor remains are to be found in the Riviera Tito Livio and Riviera Albertino Mussato; the only gates to remain from this wall are the main north gate, Porta Molino (or Molini, after several mills in the area which functioned up to the early 20th century), and the main west gate, Porta Altinate (named after the road to Altino which began here).

The Porta Molino's upper stories were used at the end of the 19th century as a reservoir the town's first drinking water system, though tales of the tower being used as an observatory by Galileo Galilei during his time in the city are probably false. The Porta Altinate fronted onto the Naviglio Interno, crossed by an ancient Roman three-arch bridge (the Naviglio and the bridge were buried in the 1960s), and in 1256 this gate was stormed and destroyed by crusaders fighting against Ezzelino da Romano (as recorded in an inscription recorded by Carlo Leoni). It was rebuilt in 1286.

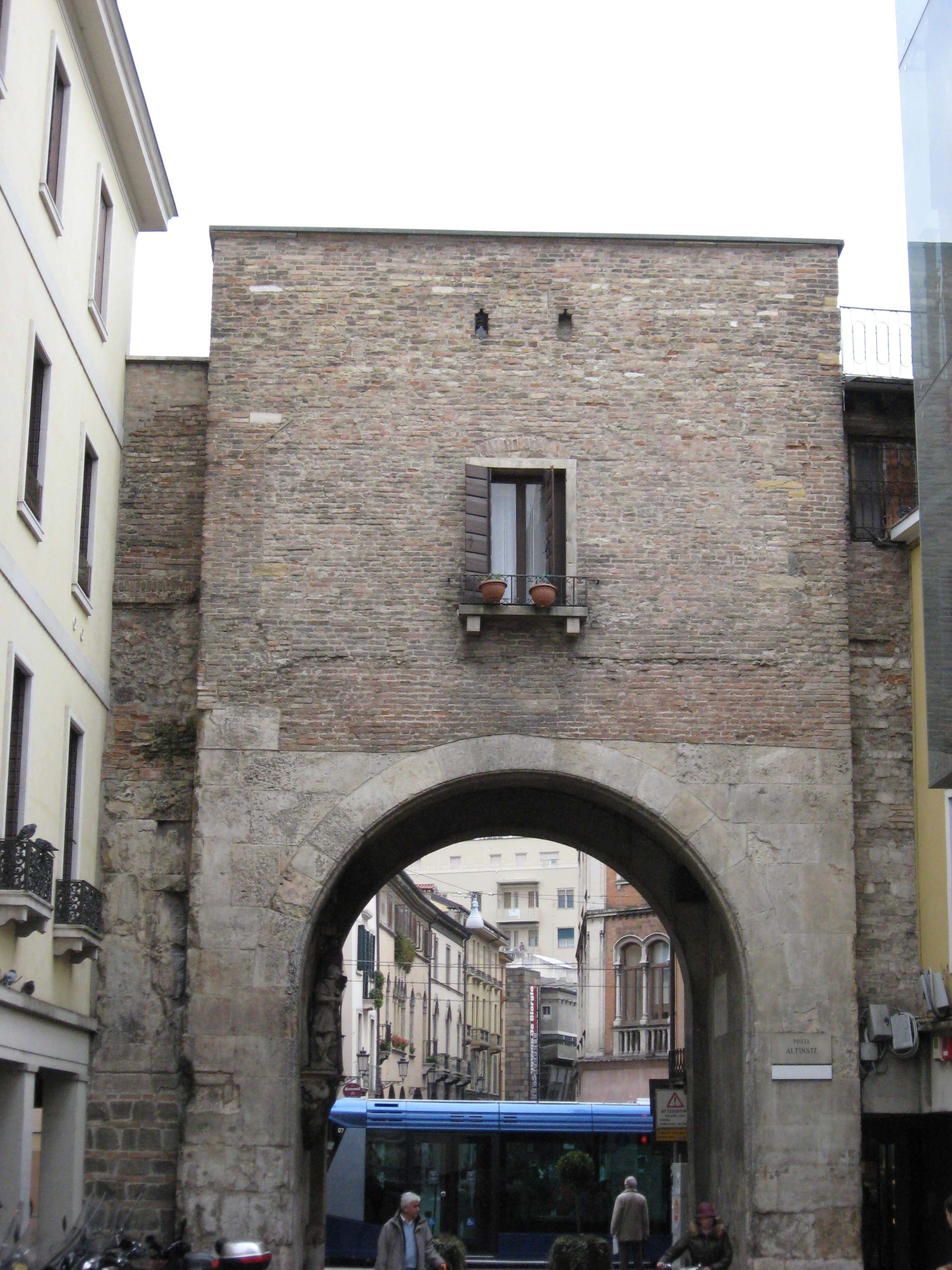
Porta Altinate seen from Piazza Garibaldi.

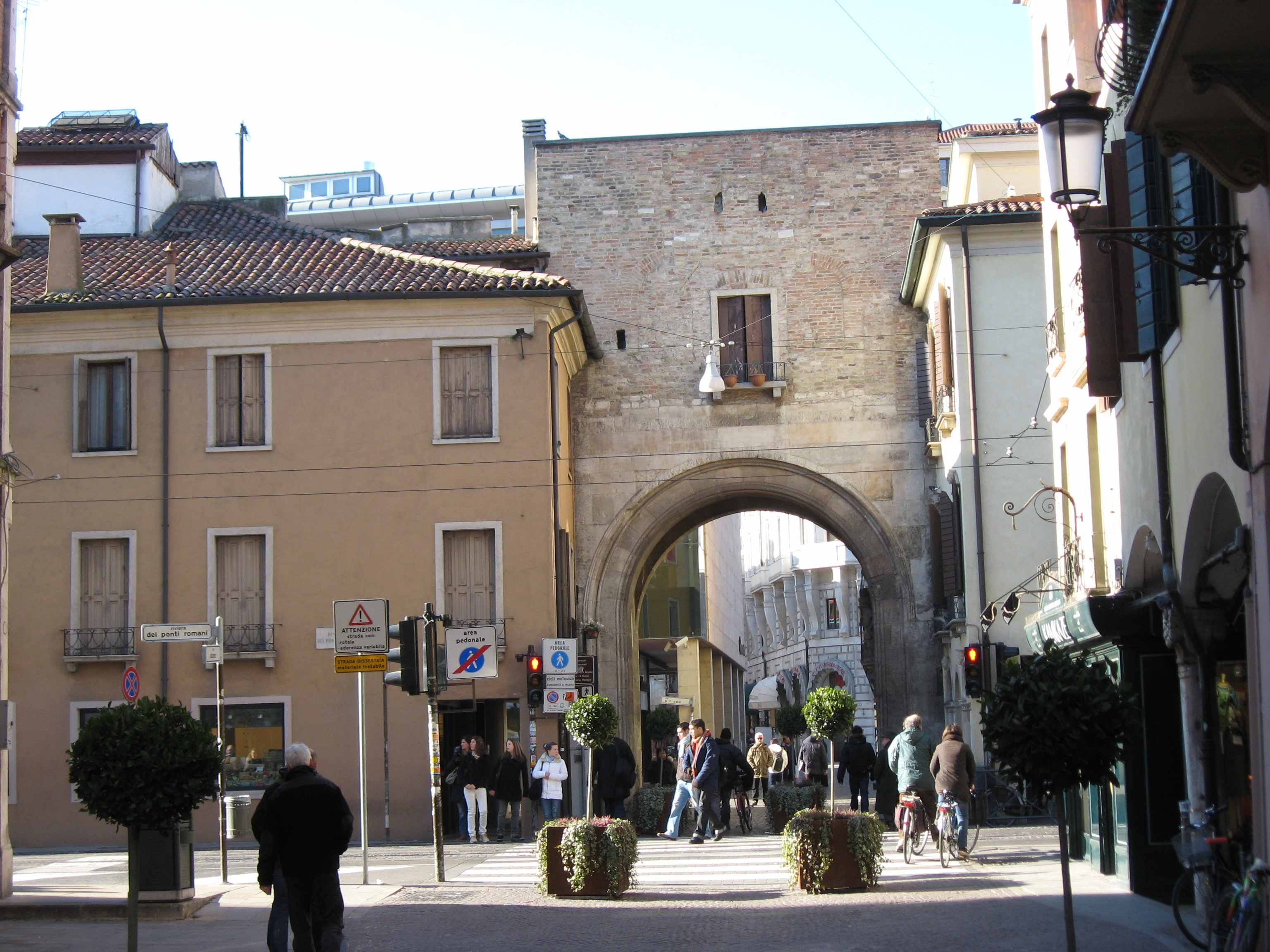
Porta Altinate seen from the Contrada Altinate.

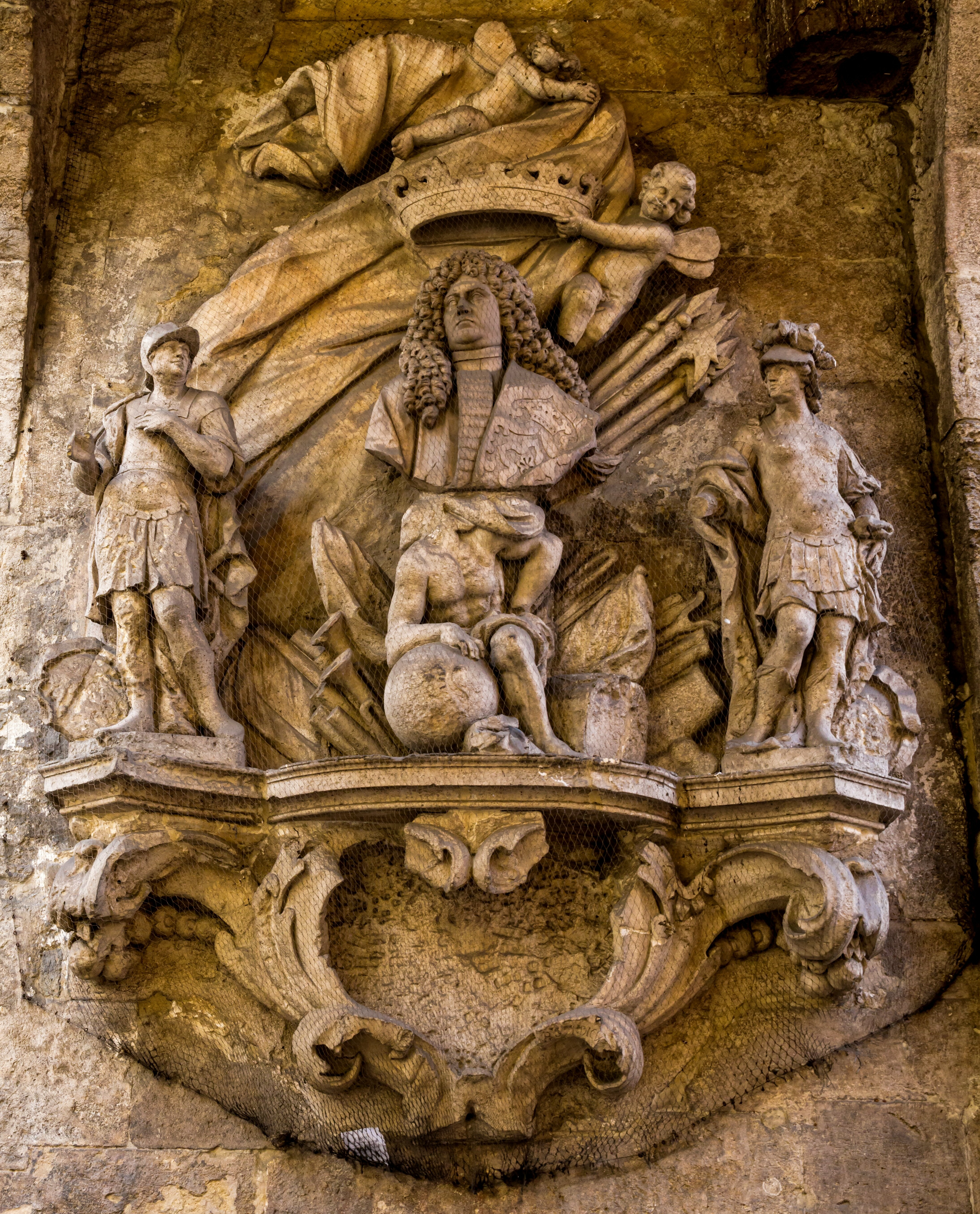
Monument to Alvise Pisani, inside Porta Altinate.

=== 14th century ===
The Mura Carraresi ("Carrarese Walls") were built by the Carraresi in the 14th century and followed a route which corresponds almost entirely to that of the later 16th century wall. Almost nothing remains of them, since they were demolished during the War of the League of Cambrai to create the Renaissance wall - some sections can be seen in via delle Dimesse, near the Prato della Valle.

=== 16th century ===
The Mura Cinquecentesche ("16th-century Walls"; also known as the Mura rinascimentali or Veneziane) were built during the first decades of the 16th century by the Venetian Republic under the local leadership of the condottiero Bartolomeo d'Alviano. The west flank was protected by the canal still known as the fossa Bastioni. Most of the walls and nearly all the gates survive unbroken apart from sections demolished in the 1960s to build the new Ospedale Civile. The gates include:

- Porta Savonarola - Completed in 1530. Designed by the architect Giovanni Maria Falconetto, this gate was built with a frieze showing the Lion of Saint Mark, symbol of the Venetian Republic, which still survives.
- Porta san Giovanni - Completed in 1528. Designed by the architect Giovanni Maria Falconetto, this gate originally had a frieze showing the Lion of Saint Mark, symbol of the Venetian Republic (the frieze here was destroyed during the Napoleonic Wars).
- Porta Ognissanti (or Portello, Portello Nuovo or Portello Venezia) - Originally entitled Portello or Little Port, the gate was built at the terminus for the river trade along the Brenta between Padua and Venice. The present building replaces the Portello Vecchio, on what is now via San Massimo, but is different from the city's other contemporary gates - the external facade is adorned with white Istrian marble, with four pairs of columns surmounted by an architrave embellished with four trachyte cannonballs. The three-arch bridge carrying the road over the Canale Piovego and through the gate is guarded by two white stone lions. This conceals the gate's true tactical nature. Stones in the gate (still legible today) commemorate the ancient origins of the town, eulogising its good governance. Since 1535 a clock stands out from the gate on a sort of "torrino" (vaguely like that on the Quirinal), in Nanto stone, atop the gate. Traces of frescoes can also be seen inside the gate.
- Porta Liviana - Begun in 1509, it was completed in 1517 and named in honour of Bartolomeo d'Alviano himself.
- Porta Santa Croce - On the site of a gate in the Carraresi wall, the present gate was begun in 1509 and was originally defended by a tower, demolished in 1632.
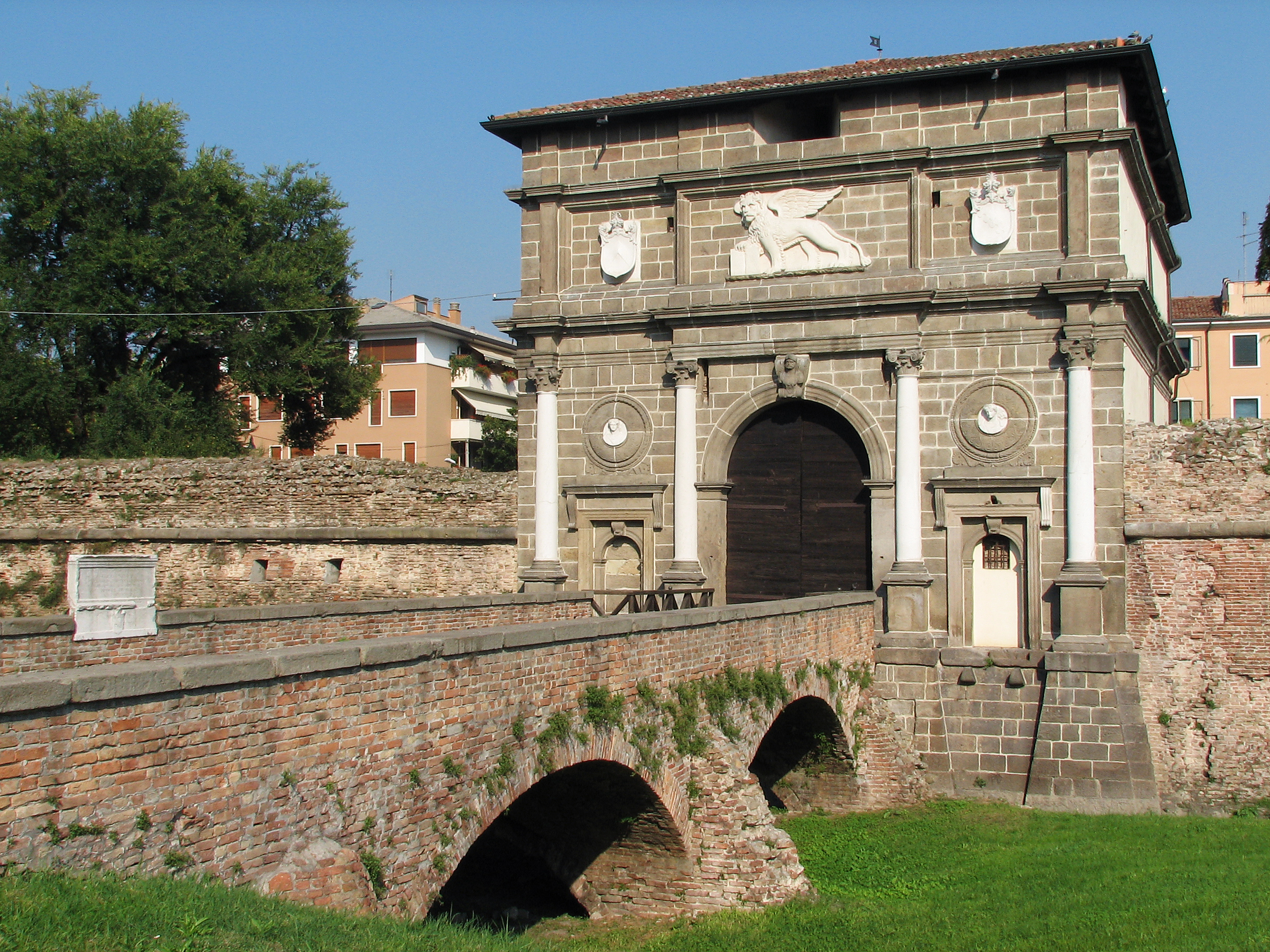
Porta Savonarola

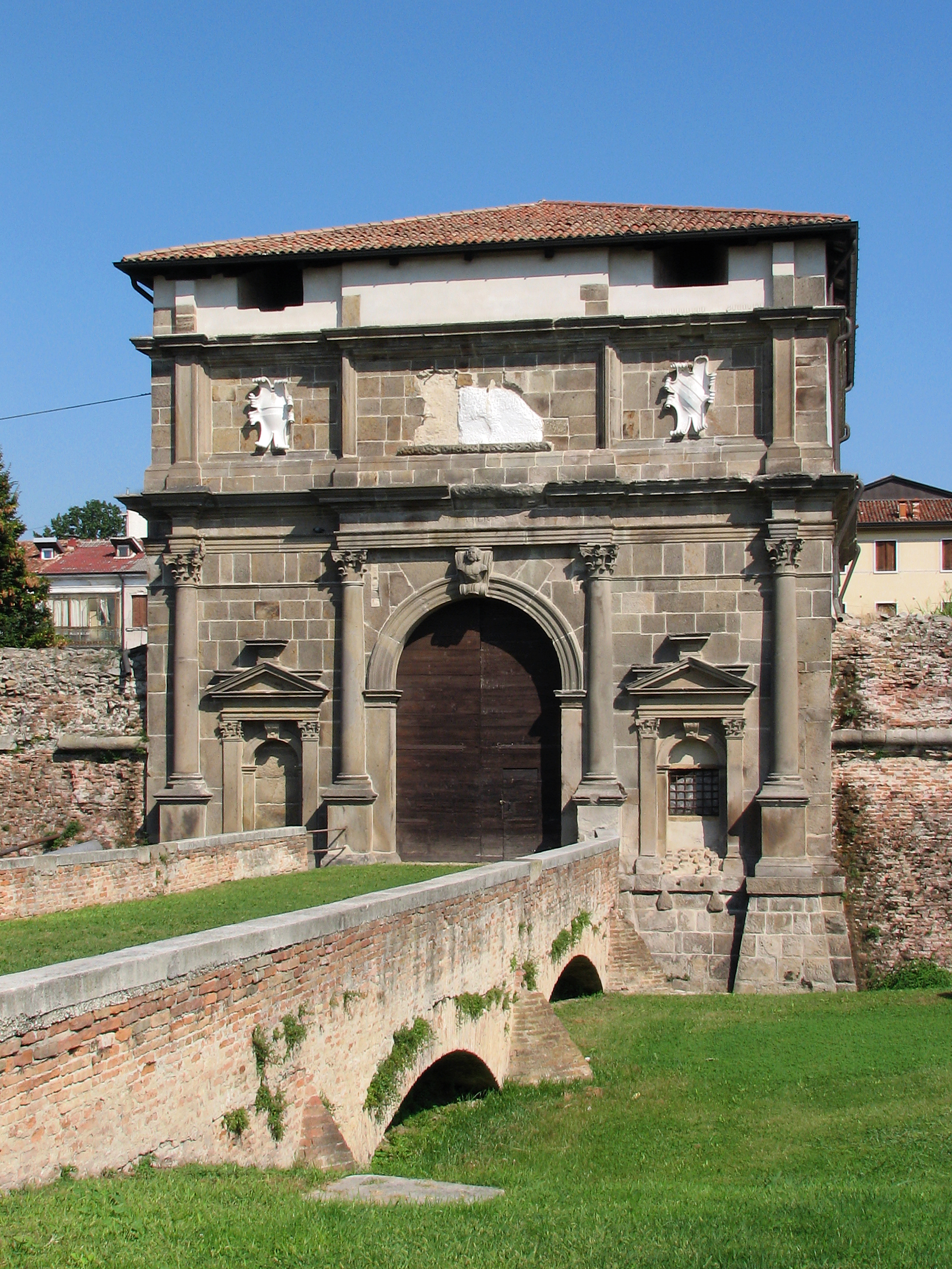
Porta San Giovanni

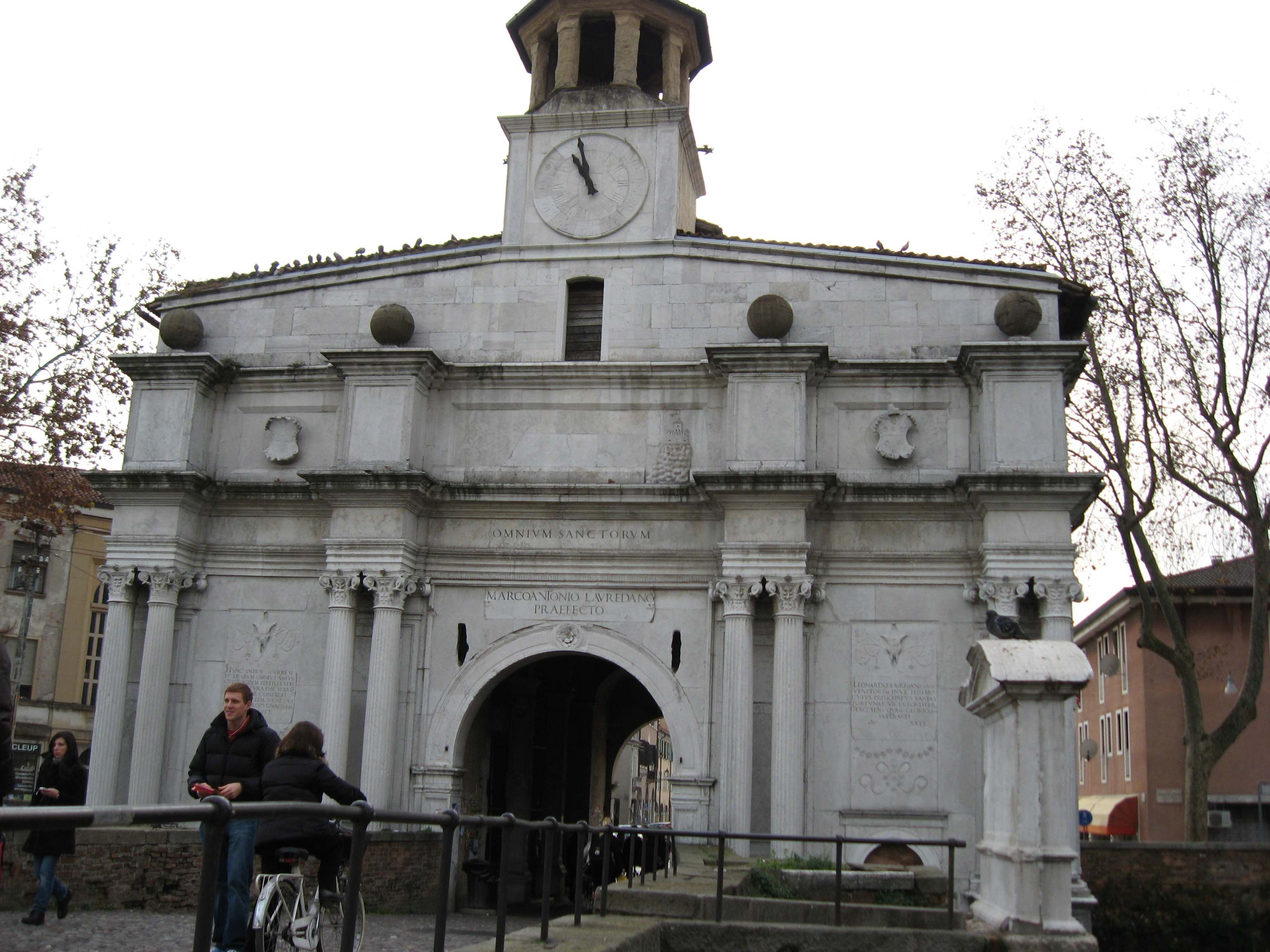
View of Porta Ognissanti from the north.

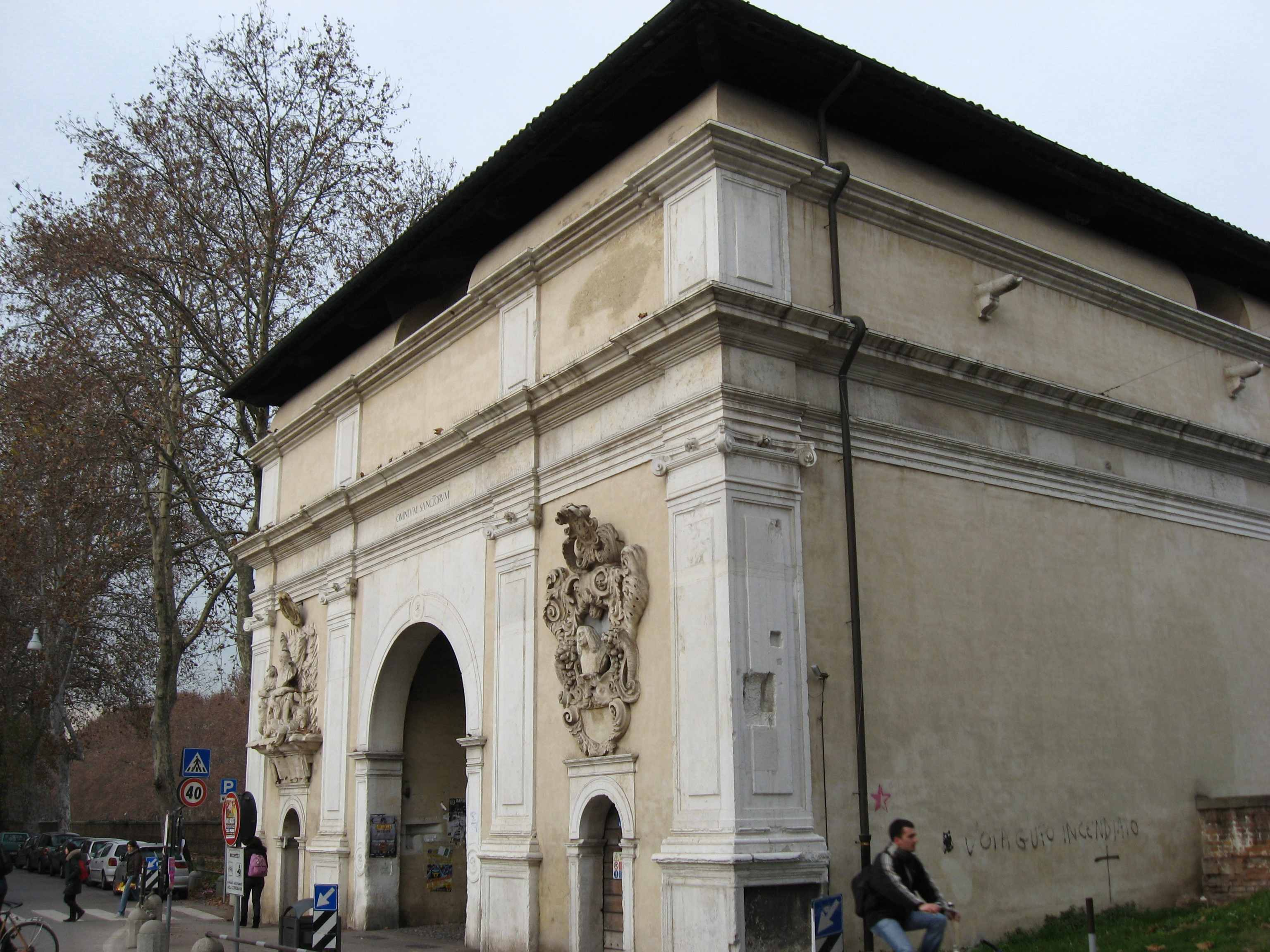
View of Porta Ognissanti from the south-east.

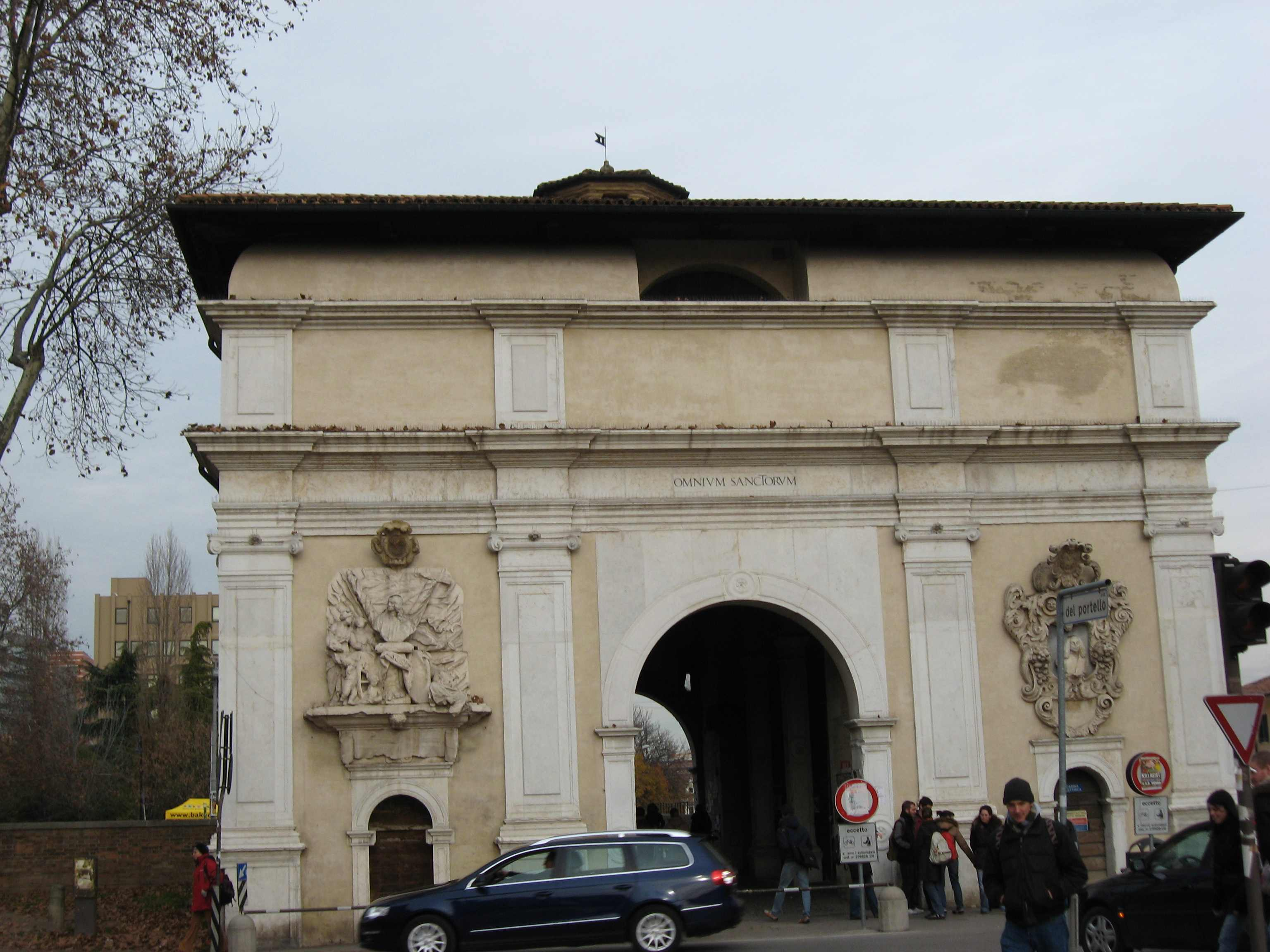
View of Porta Ognissanti from the south.

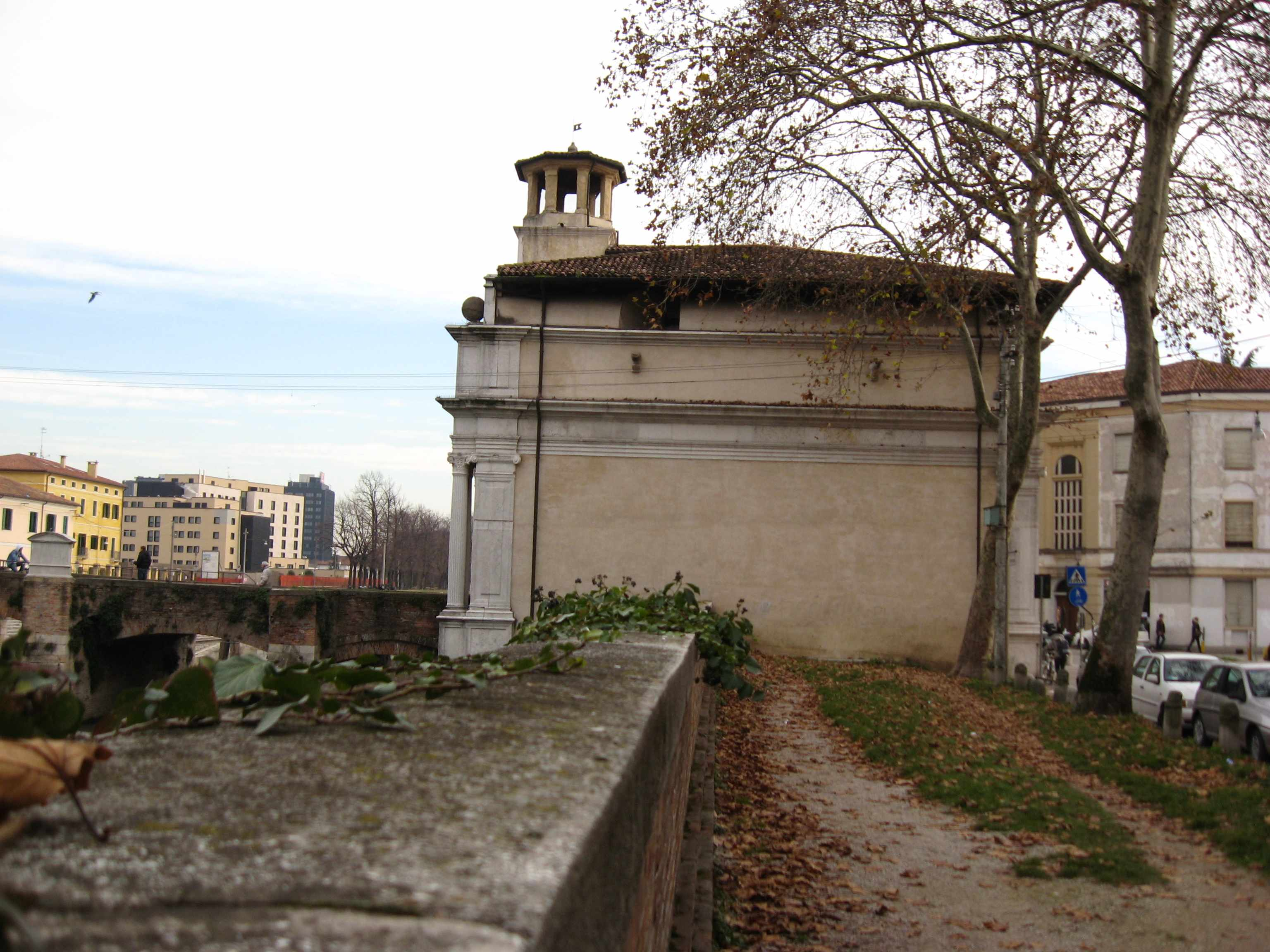
View of Porta Ognissanti from the west.

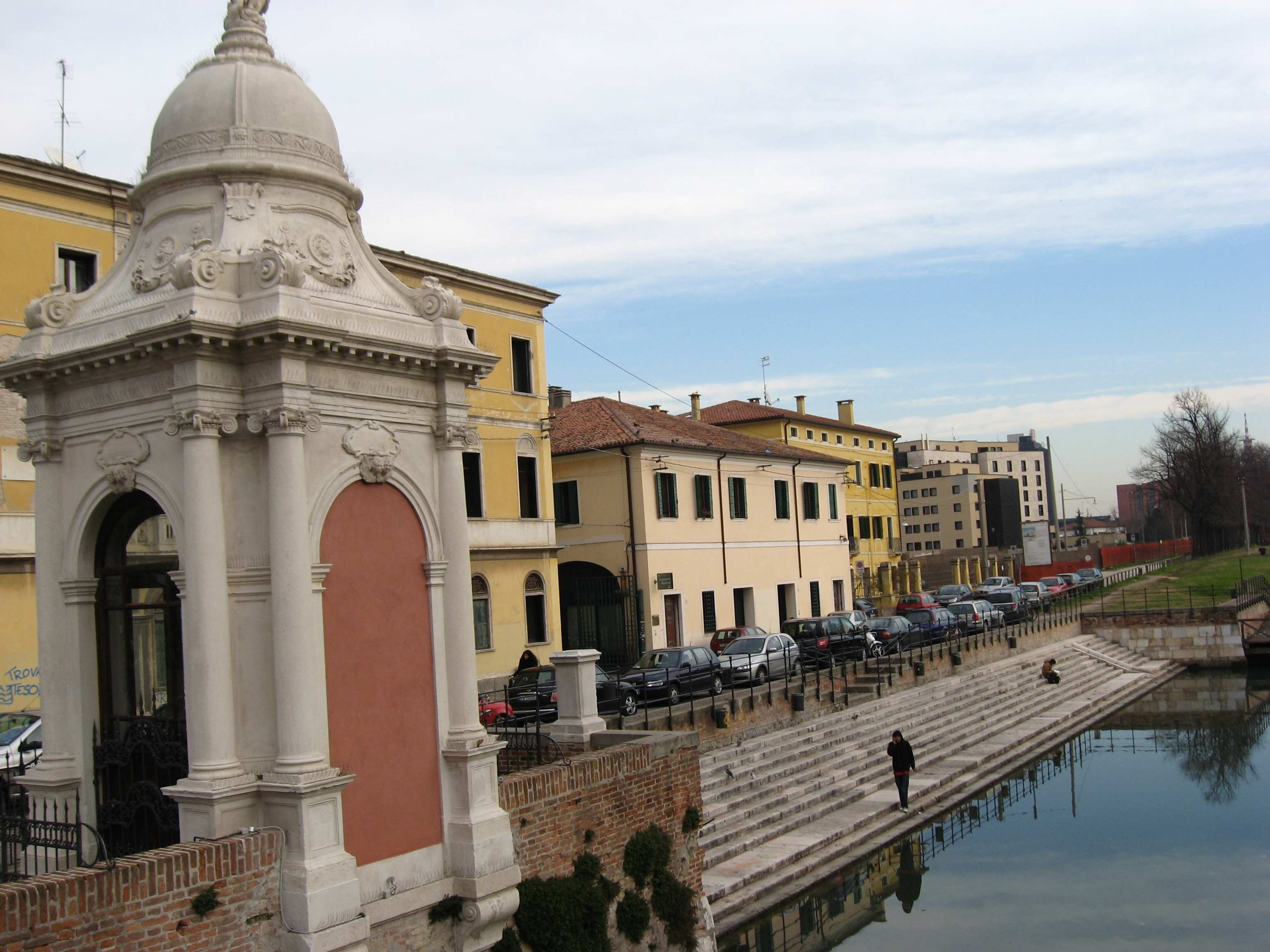
The Scalette del Portello seen from Porta Ognissanti.

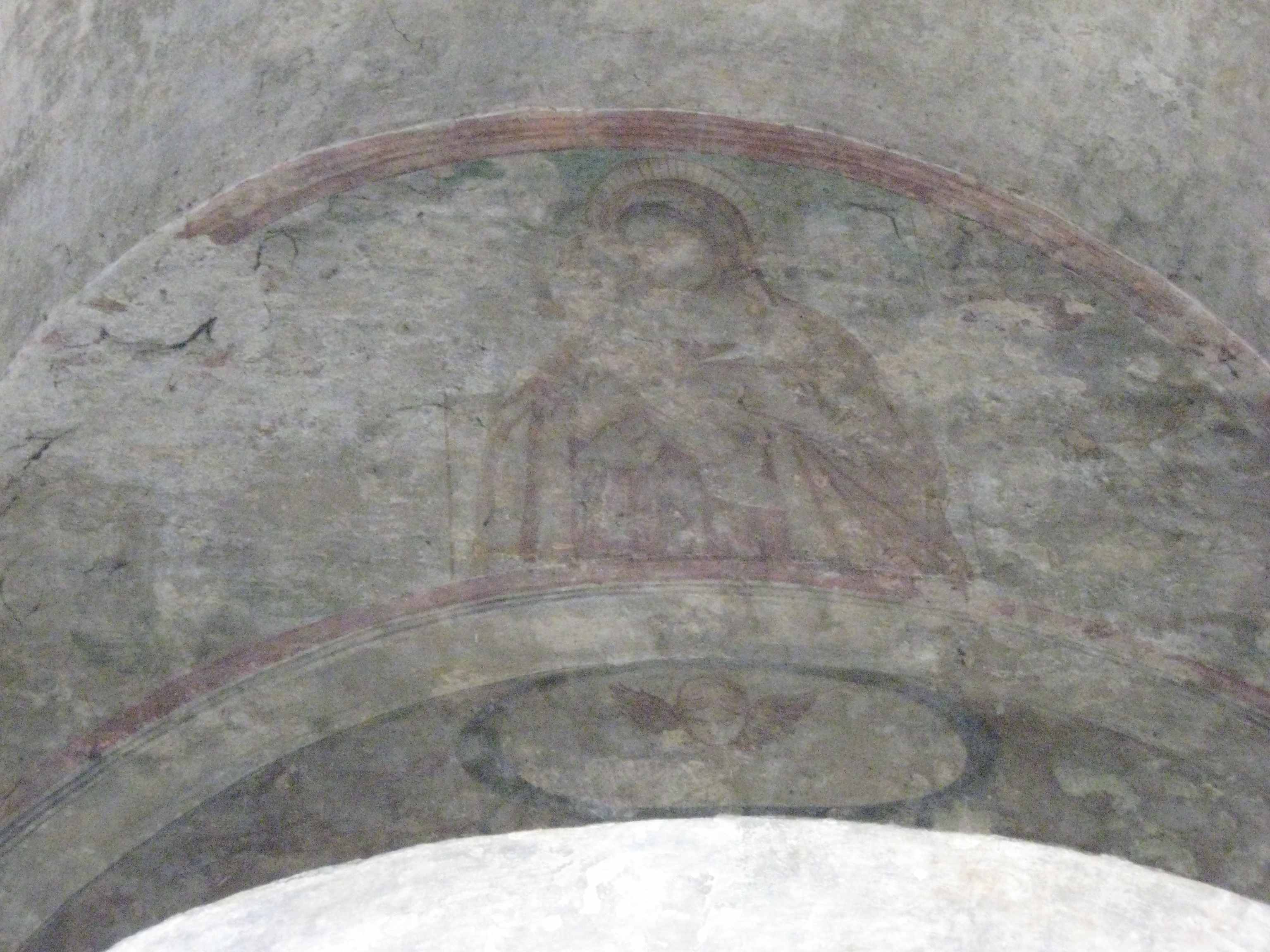
Detail of the frescoes inside Porta Ognissanti.

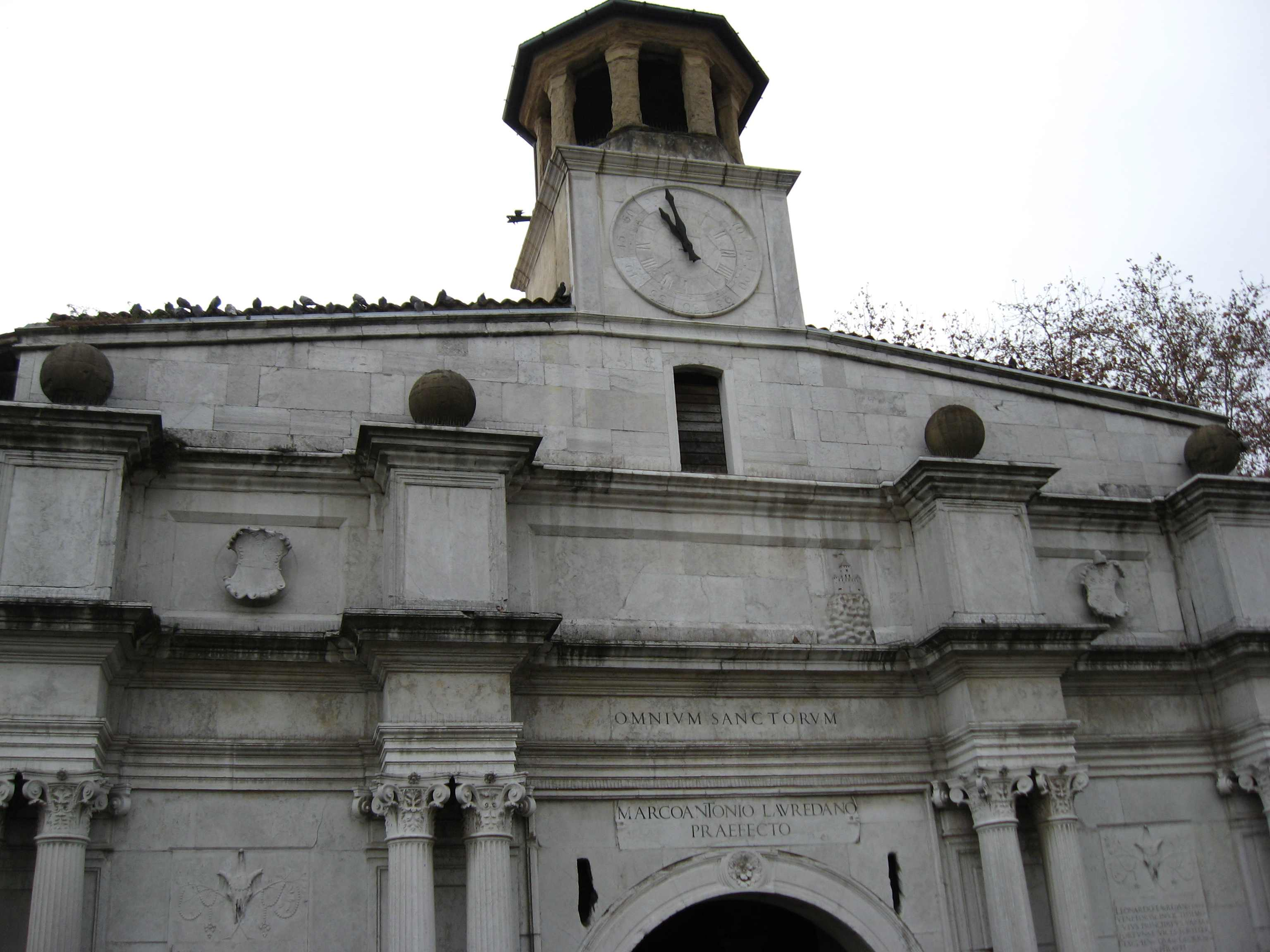
Detail of the view of Porta Ognissanti from the north.

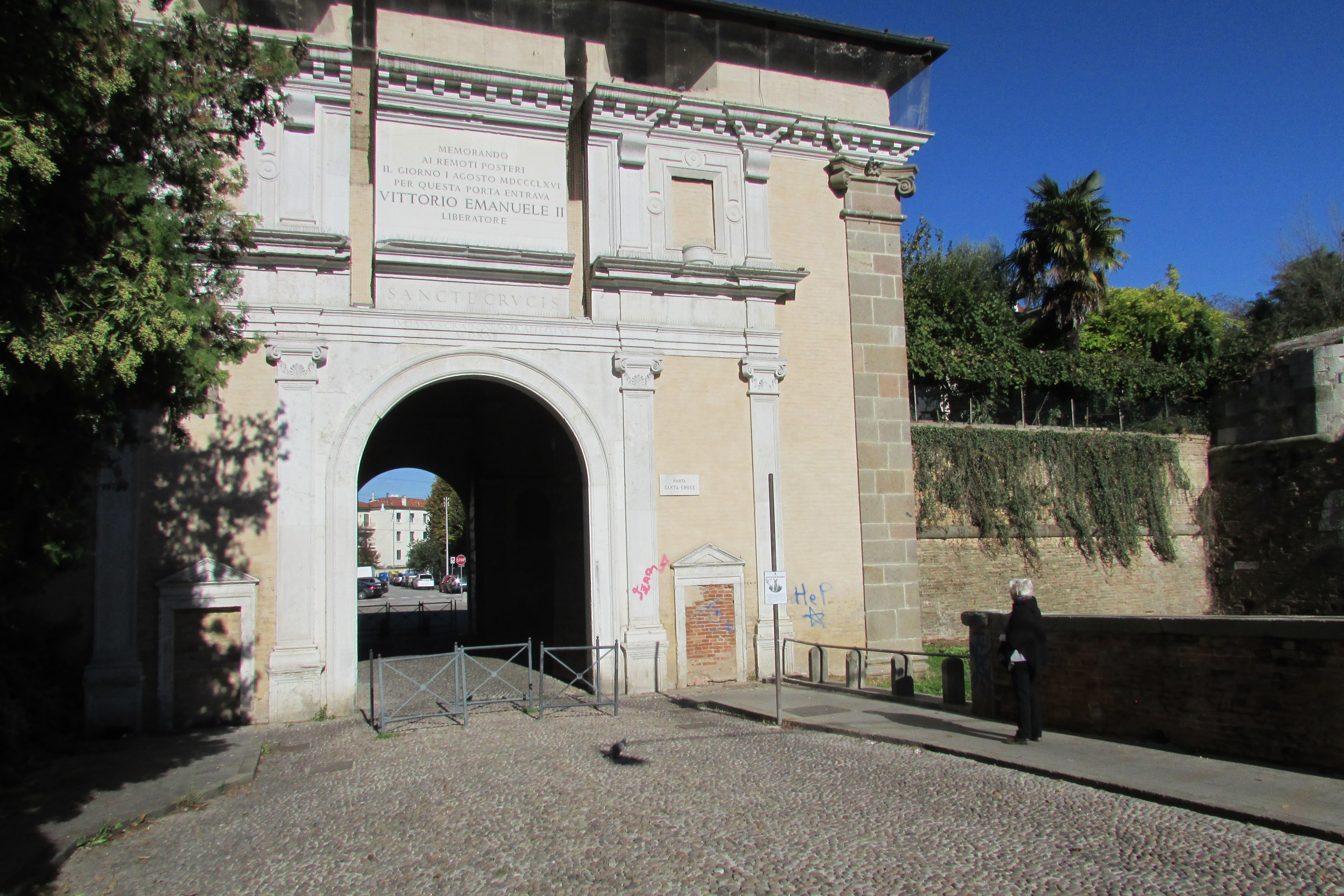
Approach to the Porta Santa Croce.

== Later use of the walls ==
Recent discussions about the city walls have discussed creating a green ring around them, a green lung as envisioned by the town planner Luigi Piccinato, though recent works seem to be moving in the opposite direction (including the controversial monument "Memory and Light" by the architect Daniel Libeskind in the golena of the Porte Contarine).
