= Lodovico Leoni =

Italian painter (1531–1606)

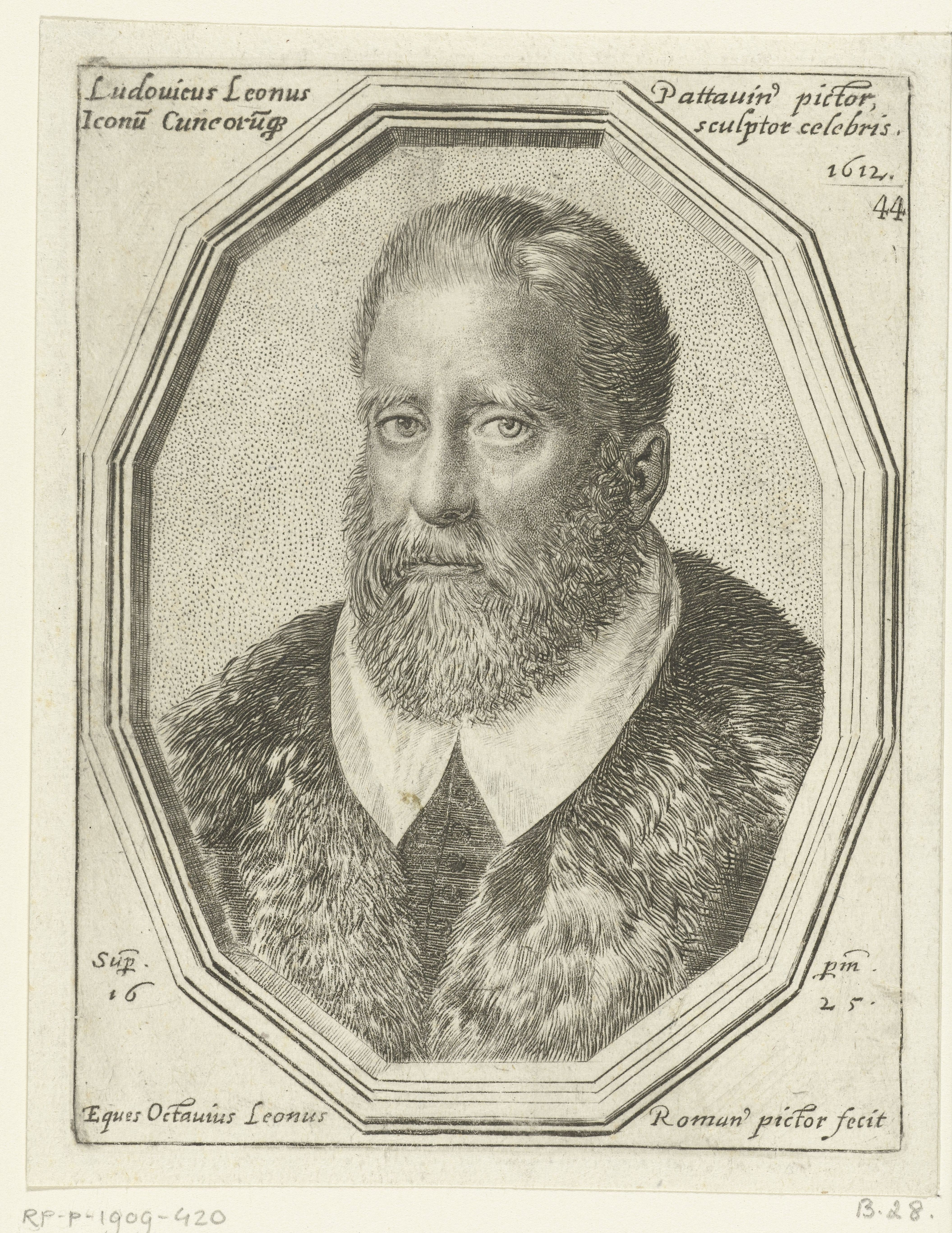
Ottavio Leoni, Portrait of Ludovico Leoni, 1612

Lodovico Leoni (1531–1606) was an Italian painter of the Renaissance period, mainly active in Rome. He was also a medallist, and coin-engraver. Other sources cite his name as Luigi Leone.

== Biography ==
He was born at Padua. He was also called il Padovadino. He spent most of his life in Rome, where he died, and executed portraits in wax, besides painting in oil and fresco landscapes and historical subjects. He was active as a portraitist during the papacy of Paul V. He was in demand for wax portraits as well as painted portraits.

His son, of the same name, nickname and career, was born in Rome, and died at the age of 52 years. Baglione refers to his son as Ottavio. Luigi Leone is different from the contemporary sculptor, Leone Leoni.

== See also ==
- Ottavio Leoni
