= Ottavio Leoni =

Italian painter (1578–1630)

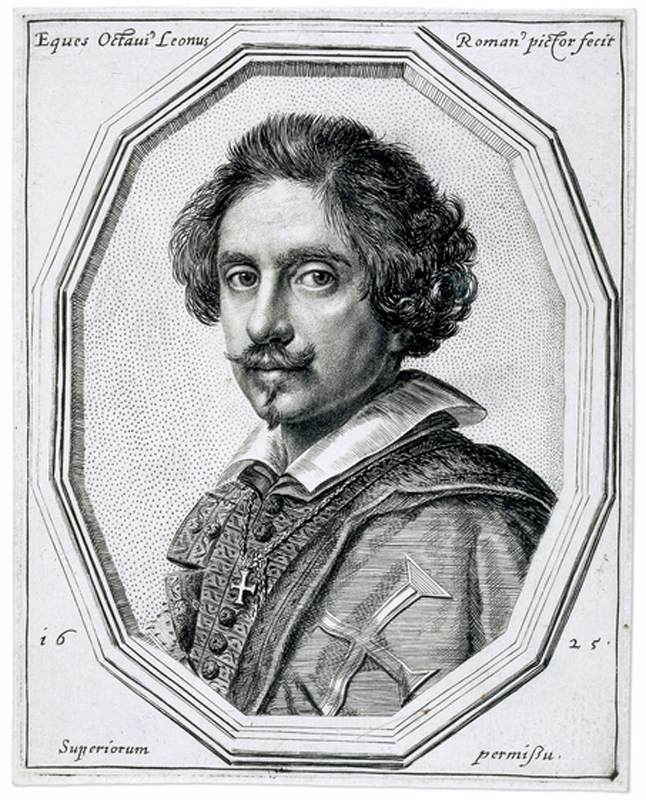
Ottavio Leoni, self-portrayed in this engraving (1625).

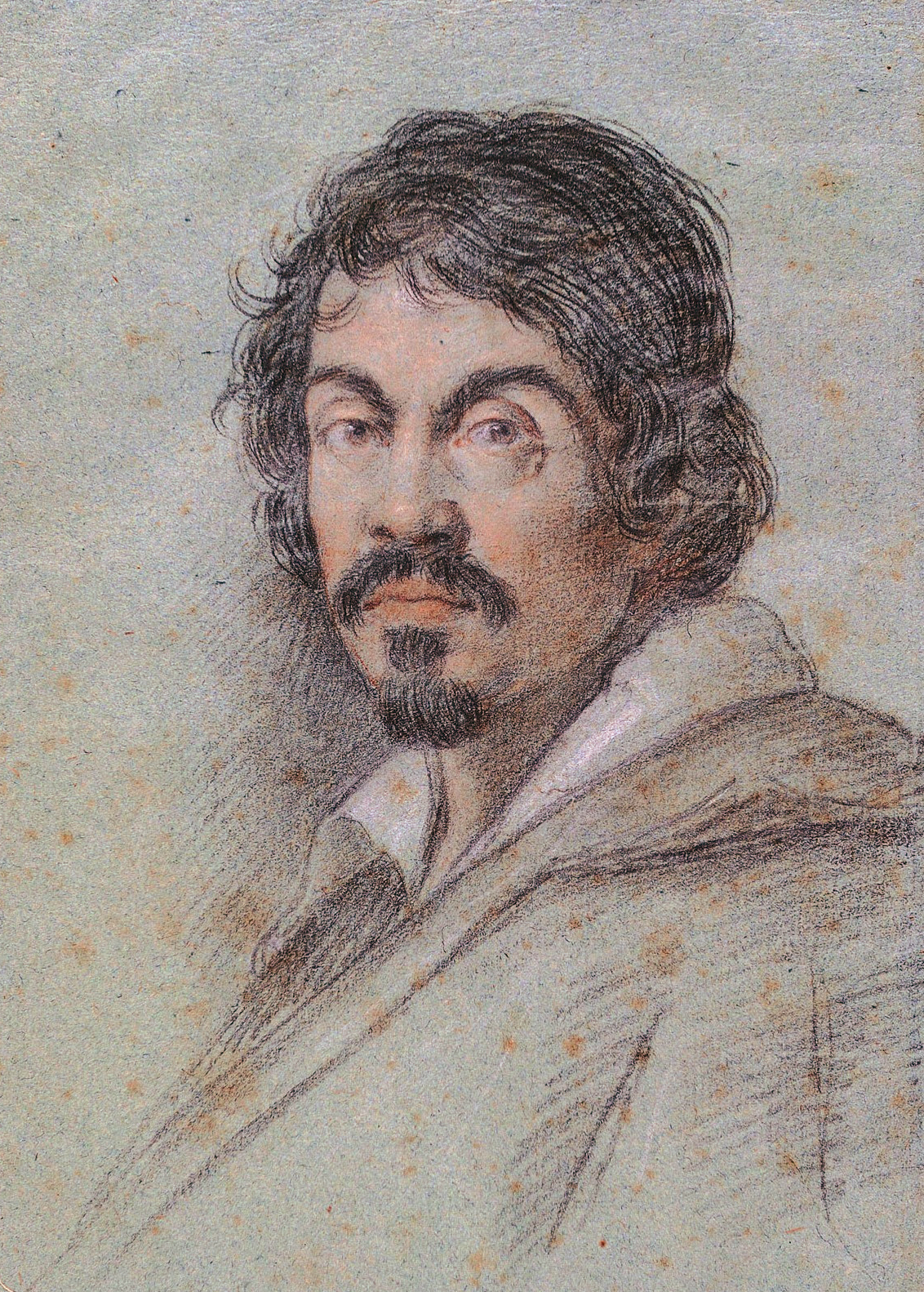
A drawing of Caravaggio by Ottavio Leoni (c. 1621)

Ottavio Leoni (1578 – 4 September 1630) was an Italian painter and printmaker of the early-Baroque, active mainly in Rome.

== Life ==
Ottavio Leoni (sometimes spelled 'Lioni'), draughtsman and engraver was in his day the most fashionable portraitist in Rome. He is sometimes also referred to as the Cavaliere Ottavio, il Padovano, il Padovanino or Cavaliere Padovano. He was born in Rome, where he first trained with his father, Lodovico Leoni. He painted altarpieces for churches in Rome such as an Annunciation for Sant'Eustachio, a Virgin and child with St. Giacinto for Santa Maria della Minerva, and a Saints Charles, Francis, & Nicholas for Sant’ Urbano. He became a member, and later president, of the Accademia di San Luca and a Cavaliere of the Order of Christ, on which occasion he presented the church of the Academy the Martyrdom of St. Martina. He died in Rome. Ottavio Leoni was also the engraver of a set of portraits of painters. His portrait of Michelangelo Merisi Caravaggio is the only documented portrait of the painter by another artist.

His work is exhibited in places such as Fine Arts Museums of San Francisco; Museum of Fine Arts, Boston; National Gallery of Art; Bowes Museum; Courtauld Institute of Art; Los Angeles County Museum of Art; and Palazzo Ruspoli, Rome, Italy.
