= Leoncito =

Leoncito means "little lion" in Spanish. It may also refer to:

- Antonio León Amador, better known as "Leoncito", a Spanish professional association football player
- Leoncito Astronomical Complex, astronomical observatory in the San Juan Province of Argentina
- El Leoncito National Park, a national park of Argentina
- 2311 El Leoncito, outer main belt asteroid
