= Colascione =

Long-necked lute

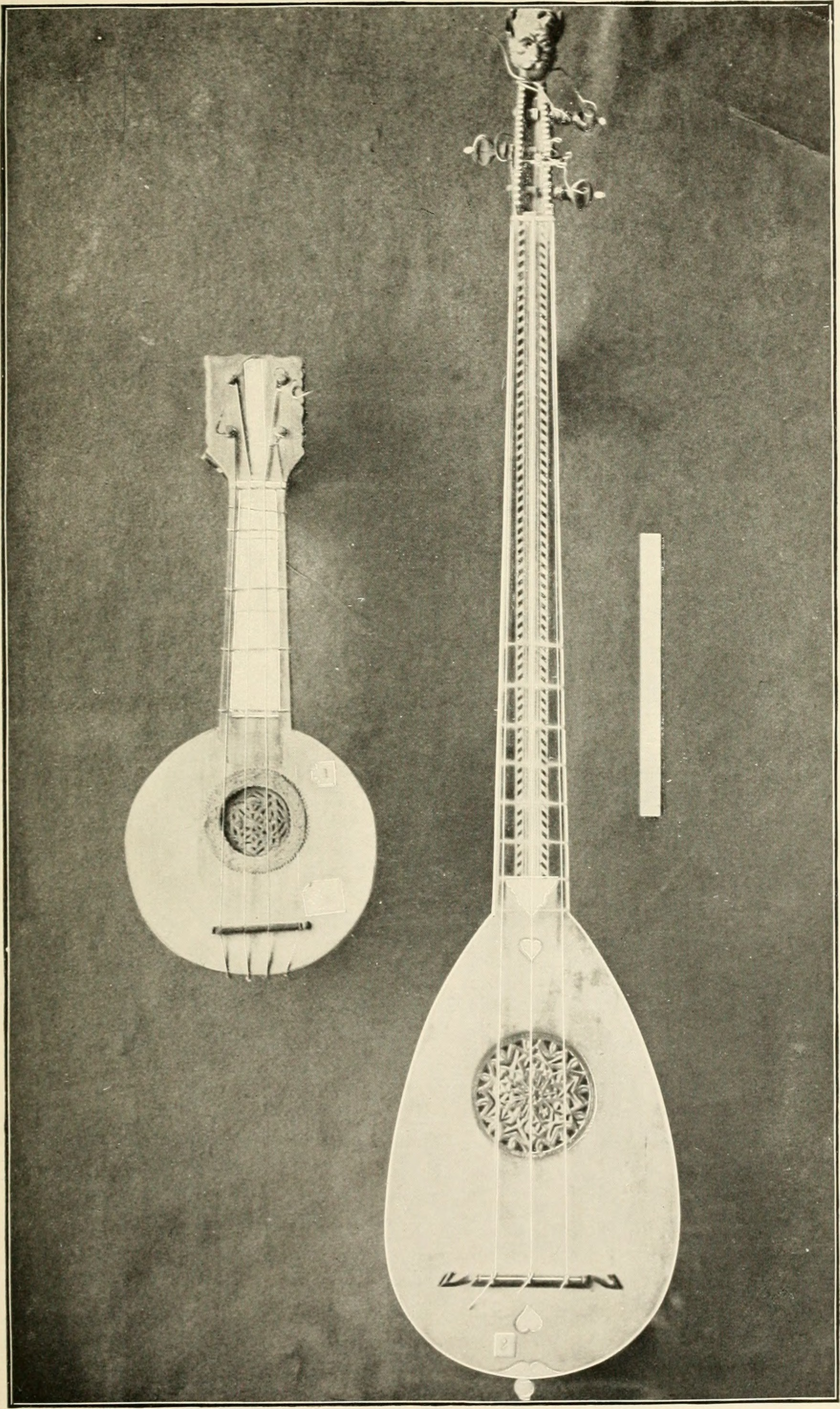
- Colascione (right)

String instrument
- Other names: Colachon
- Classification: Plucked
- Developed: Italy, Renaissance

The colascione (or calascione, Italian: [kolaʃˈʃoːne], French: colachon [kɔlaʃɔ̃], also sometimes known as liuto della giraffa meaning giraffe-lute, a reference to its long neck, is a plucked string instrument from the late Renaissance and early Baroque periods, with a lute-like resonant body and a very long neck. It was mainly used in southern Italy. It has two or three strings tuned in fifths.

Noteworthy are the great similarities of the colascione with instruments such as the dutar, the tanbur or the saz. Nevertheless, there are important differences, such as the bridge being on the top of the body.

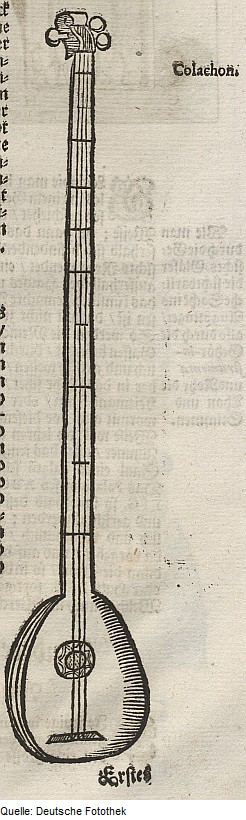
Image of Colascione from woodcut from Deutsche Fotothek

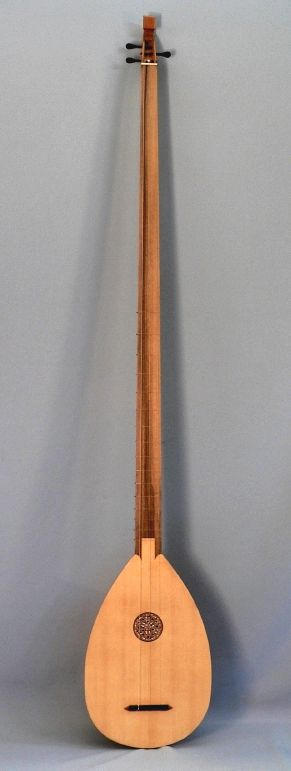
A modern reconstruction

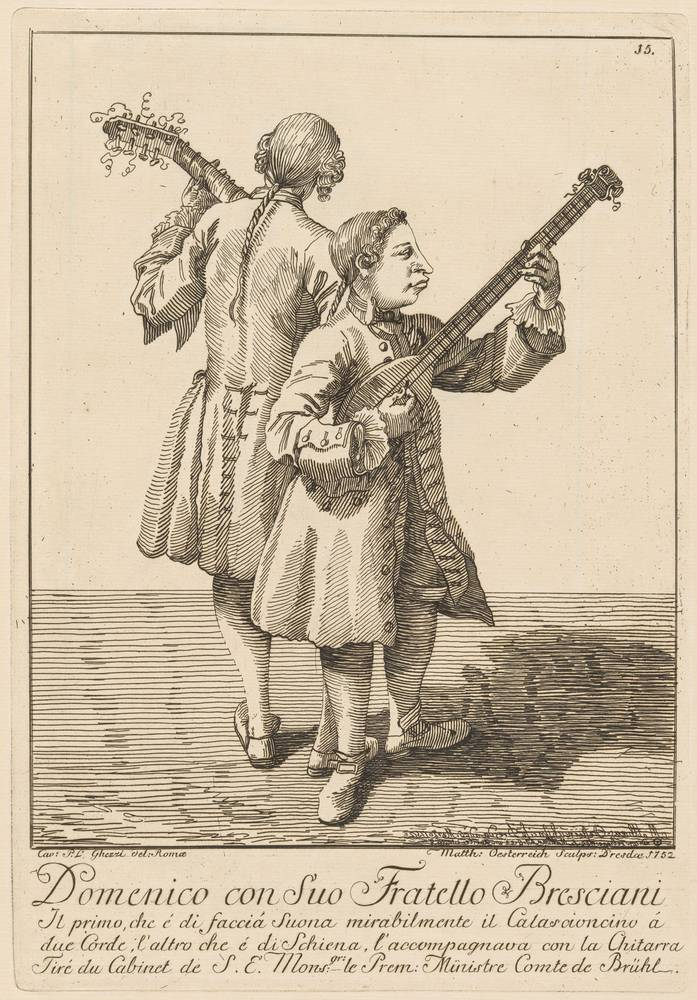
Domenico Colla and his brother, who toured Europe in the 1760s, playing both colascione and colascioncino.

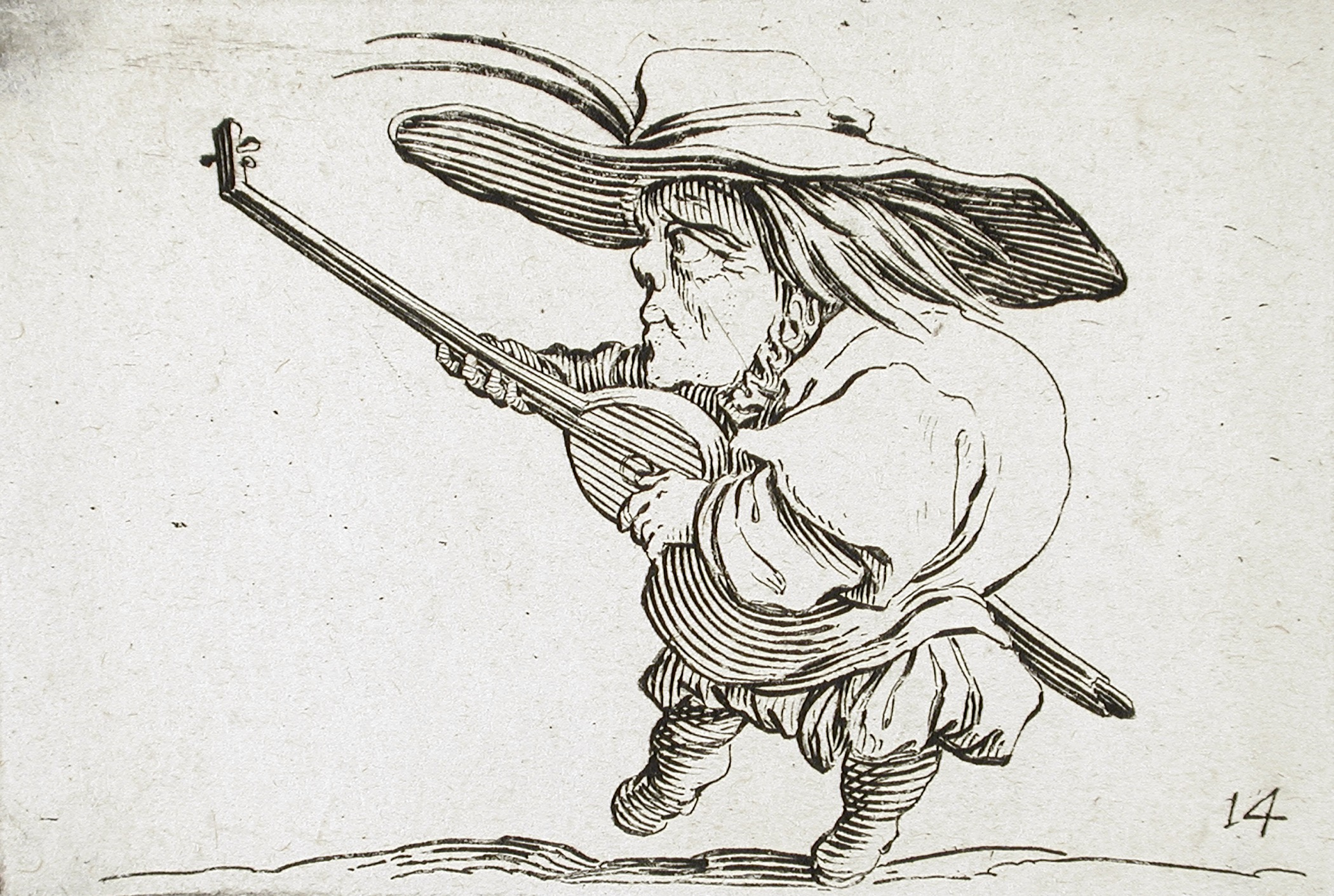
Colascione in an illustration from France, 1616.

== Colascioncino ==
A smaller version of the instrument existed, called the colascioncino, with string length 50–60 centimeters. The string length for the colascione was 100–130 centimeters. Domenico Colla toured Europe with his brother in the 1760s, playing both colascione and colascioncino.

In the literature of colascione, it is often confused with calichon, a bass version of the mandora.
