= Emanuele Barbella =

Italian composer and violinist

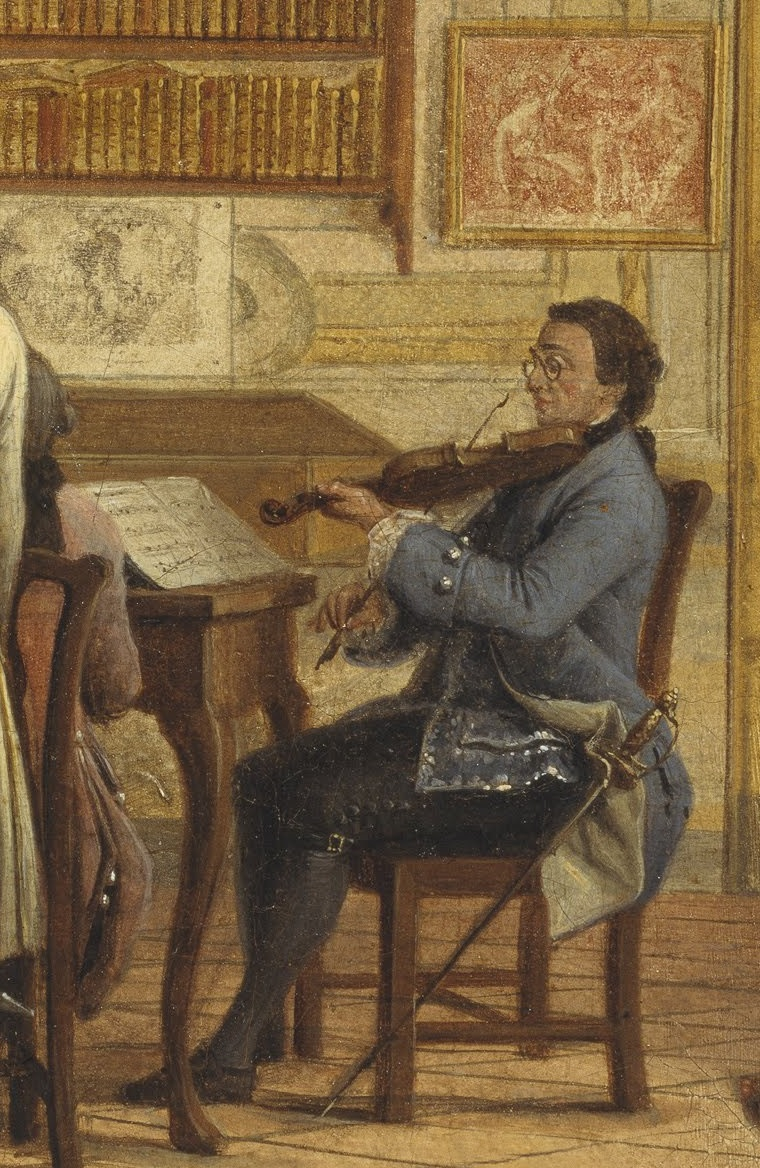
Pietro Fabris, Emanuele Barbella, 1770

Emanuele Barbella (1718–1777) was a Neapolitan composer and violinist.

He received his first violin lessons from his father, a violinist and violin teacher at the Conservatory of Santa Maria di Loreto, and later studied the instrument with Angelo Zaga and Pasquale Bini, a pupil of Giuseppe Tartini. At the same time, he began studying music theory and composition with Michele Caballone, with whom he studied until his death in 1740. From that year until 1744, he continued his studies with Leonardo Leo. In 1753, he was first violin at the Teatro Nuovo in Naples, and from 1761 until his death, he was a member of the orchestra of the Teatro San Carlo. During the 1760s, he probably undertook a trip to England.

He was esteemed as a virtuoso by his contemporaries.

Among his students was Ignazio Raimondi.

== Works ==
- Elmira generosa (opera buffa, libretto by Pietro Trinchera, 1753, Napoli; composed with Nicola Bonifacio Logroscino)
- Tinna noonna, lullaby for violin and bass
- 2 concertos
- 12 trios for 2 violins and bass (or violin, violetta and bass)
- 6 trios for violin and cello
- 33 duets for 2 violins (or mandolin and bass)
- 12 solos for violin and bass (or two violins)
- 17 sonatas for violin and bass
- 6 sonatas for 2 violins, cello and harpsichord
- 6 sonatas for violin and cello
- 6 sonatas for 2 mandolins
- 3 sonatas for 2 violins and bass
- 3 sonatas for 2 violins
- Sonata for 2 mandolins and bass
