= François-Hippolyte Barthélémon =

French violinist, pedagogue and composer

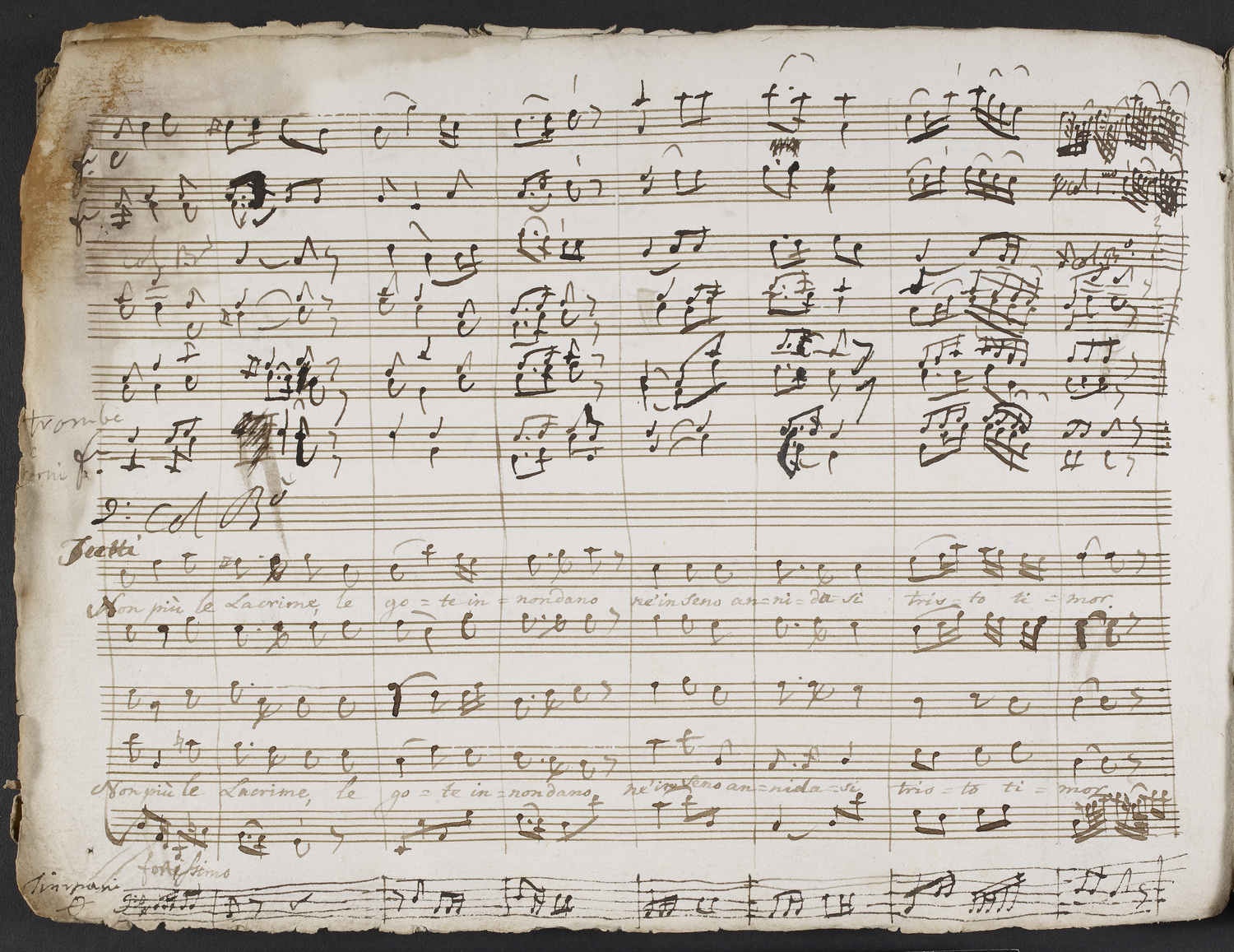
Manuscript copy of Jefte in Mafsa.

François Hippolyte Barthélemon (27 July 1741 – 20 July 1808) was a French violinist, pedagogue and composer active in England.

== Biography ==
Barthélemon was born in Bordeaux (Gironde), France. He received his education in Paris, where he studied musical composition and violin, and performed in the orchestra of the Comédie-Italienne. In 1764, he traveled to England to lead a band at the King's Theatre and at Marylebone Gardens where he was received with enthusiasm. This led to a commission for his first dramatic stage work, Pelopida, an opera in three acts in the Italian style that was performed at the King's Theatre in 1766. David Garrick of the Drury Lane Theatre engaged him to compose music to Garrick's two-act farcical burletta based on the Orpheus myth, which premiered in 1768. In the same year, Barthélemon also premiered Oithona, a three-act dramatic operatic poem; La fleuve Scamandre ("The Scamander River"), a French-style comic opera based on a Greek myth; and The Judgment of Paris, another two-act burletta. Further engagements led him to decide to stay in England, where he wed soprano and composer Polly Young in December 1766 and raised a family. He is well known for his tune 'Morning Hymn' to Thomas Ken's hymn 'Awake my soul, and with the sun...', which Thomas Hardy praised in his Barthélemon at Vauxhall. He also wrote the tune of the hymn, "Mighty God While Angels Bless Thee."

Barthélemon's dashing French style of composition allowed him to produce musical entertainments in a wide range of styles. He composed salon music and chamber music, as well as volumes of popular songs, some of which were published in London in 1790. The King's Theatre engaged him to write ballet music. Barthélemon also composed scenes for humorous English ballad operas and for masques. The Maid of Oaks, a masque within a comedy in five acts based on Sylvain by Jean-François Marmontel, enjoyed much success in 1774. He also wrote six symphonies, and some concertos.

As a private teacher, Bartélemon received approval for his "scientific" technique of violin playing; however, some popular critics felt his musical compositions lacked "a clearly developed personal style."

Barthélemon died at Christ Church, Surrey, England, aged 66.

== Selected works ==
- Pelopida, opera in 3 acts (1766)
- Orpheus, burletta in 2 acts (1767)
- Oithona, dramatic poem in 3 acts (1768)
- The Judgment of Paris, burletta in 2 acts (1768)
- Le fleuve Scamandre, comic opera (1768)
- The Magic Girdle, burletta in 2 parts (1770)
- The Noble Pedlar, or The Fortune Hunter, burletta in 2 parts (1770)
- The Portrait, burletta in 2 parts (ca. 1771)
- The Wedding Day, burletta in 2 parts (1773)
- La zingara, or The Gypsy, burletta in 2 parts (1773)
- The Election, musical interlude (1774)
- The Maid of the Oaks, masque with a comedy in 5 acts (1774)
- Belphagor, or The Wishes, comic opera afterpiece in 2 acts (1778)

== Sources ==
- Sadie, Stanley (Ed.) [1992] (1994). The New Grove Dictionary of Opera, vol. 1, A-D, chpt: "Barthelemon [Barthélemon], François Hippolyte" by Linda V. Troost, New York: MacMillan. ISBN 0-935859-92-6.
