= Pier Carlo Leoni =

Italian historian and epigraphist

Conte Pier Carlo Leoni (29 January 1812, Padua – 13 July 1874) was an Italian historian and epigraphist. He is known for recording several inscriptions on the city walls of Padua, which (inspired by the Romantic taste for the medieval) were characterised more by prosopography and grandiloquence than by historical precision.
