= Carlo Leoni (politician) =

Italian politician

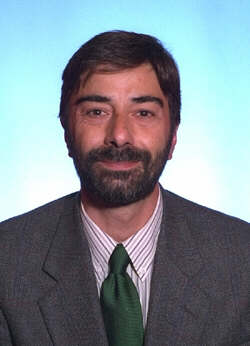
- Carlo Leoni (1996)

Vice President of the Chamber of Deputies
- Incumbent
- Assumed office 4 May 2006

Personal details
- Born: March 13, 1955 (age 71) Rome, Italy
- Party: Sinistra Democratica (formerly DS, PCI)
- Occupation: Politician

Carlo Leoni (13 March 1955, Rome) is an Italian politician.

After a long time as an activist and director of the Partito Comunista Italiano (PCI) and of the Democratici di Sinistra (DS), he became a deputy in the Italian Chamber of Deputies in 1996, and was re-elected to that role in 2001 and 2006.

In the XIV Legislatura he became the DS's capogruppo on the Commission on Institutional Affairs of the Chamber and a member of the Bicameral Anti-mafia Commission. On 4 May 2006 he was elected vice-president of the Chamber of Deputies.

Following the 4th Congress of the DS, which sanctioned the birth of the Partito Democratico, Leoni left the DS and joined the Sinistra Democratica.
