= Palazzo Marcello dei Leoni =

Palace in Venice, Italy

Coordinates: 45°26′08″N 12°19′41″E

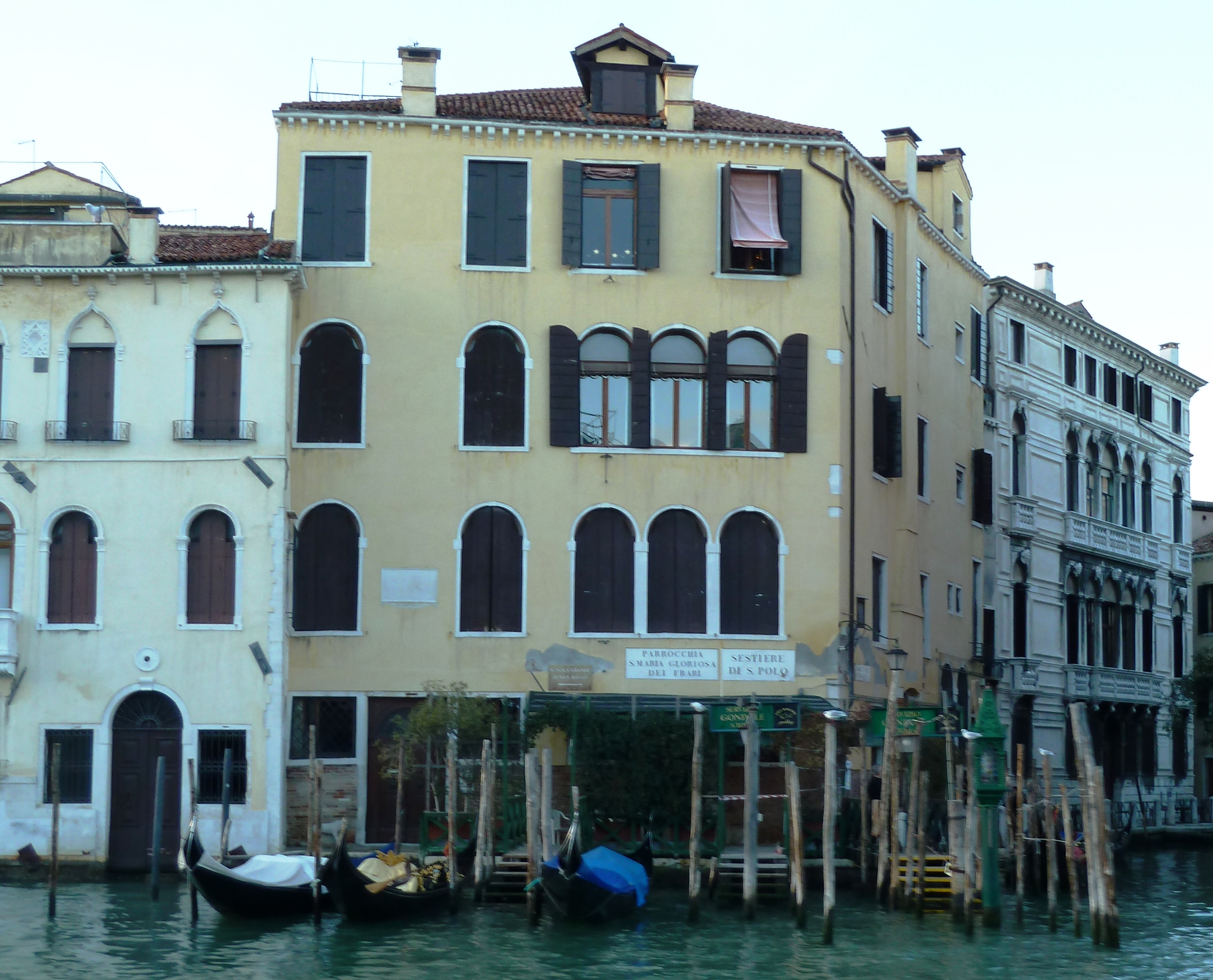
Palazzo Marcello dei Leoni

The Palazzo Marcello dei Leoni is a palace between the Rio di San Tomà e Palazzo Dolfin, on the Grand Canal in the sestiere di San Polo in Venice, Italy.

== History ==
The simple facade has round arched second story windows. The name of the palace derives from the patrician Marcello family, and the fact that the entry gate had two worn lion statues, likely once from the nearby church of San Tomà when it was rebuilt in the 14th century. The house once hosted the historian Pompeo Gherardo Molmenti.
