= Charles John Frederick Lampe =

English composer and organist (1739–1767)

Charles John Frederick Lampe (1739 – 10 September 1767) was an English composer and organist, and the son of composer John Frederick Lampe and the singer Isabella Lampe (maiden name of Young).

== Biography ==
Charles Lampe was born in London, one year into his parents' marriage. His father was a successful composer of stage music and his mother was a celebrated soprano who often appeared in her husband's operas. Isabella was also a part of the well-known Young family of musicians. Charles was named after his grandfather, Charles Young, who was a notable organist and composer. His great uncle, Anthony Young, was also a notable organist and composer. Charles's Aunt Cecilia (1712–1789), was one of the greatest English sopranos of the eighteenth century and the wife of composer Thomas Arne. His Aunt Esther was a well-known contralto and wife to Charles Jones, a successful music publisher in England during the eighteenth century. Three of his cousins, Isabella, Elizabeth, and Polly Young were all successful singers, and his cousin Michael Arne was a successful composer.

In 1758 Charles succeeded his grandfather Charles as organist at All Hallows, Barking-by-the-Tower, a post which he held until his death in 1767. From 1760 to 1761 he played in the Covent Garden orchestra. In 1763 he married Ann Smith, a singer who sang regularly at the Marylebone Gardens. The couple lived in the Drury Lane area from at least 1766, remaining there until Lampe's death in 1767 at the age of 28. As a composer Charles wrote mostly vocal songs for London's pleasure gardens and catches and glees.

== Works ==
Charles's songs include the patriotic Britannia's Invitation to her Sons, to Partake of the Glory of the Intended Expedition (c. 1755), Damon & Delia or the Retreat (1759) and a collection, Six English Songs as Sung by Mr [Thomas] Lowe & Mrs Lampe Junr at Mary-bone Gardens (1764); his music is light and appealing with much use of the Scotch snap. Lampe's only other published compositions are some catches included in The Catch Club or Merry Companions … Selected by C.I.F. Lampe (c. 1765) and in A Second Collection of Catches.
