= Michael Arne =

British composer (c.1740–c.1786)

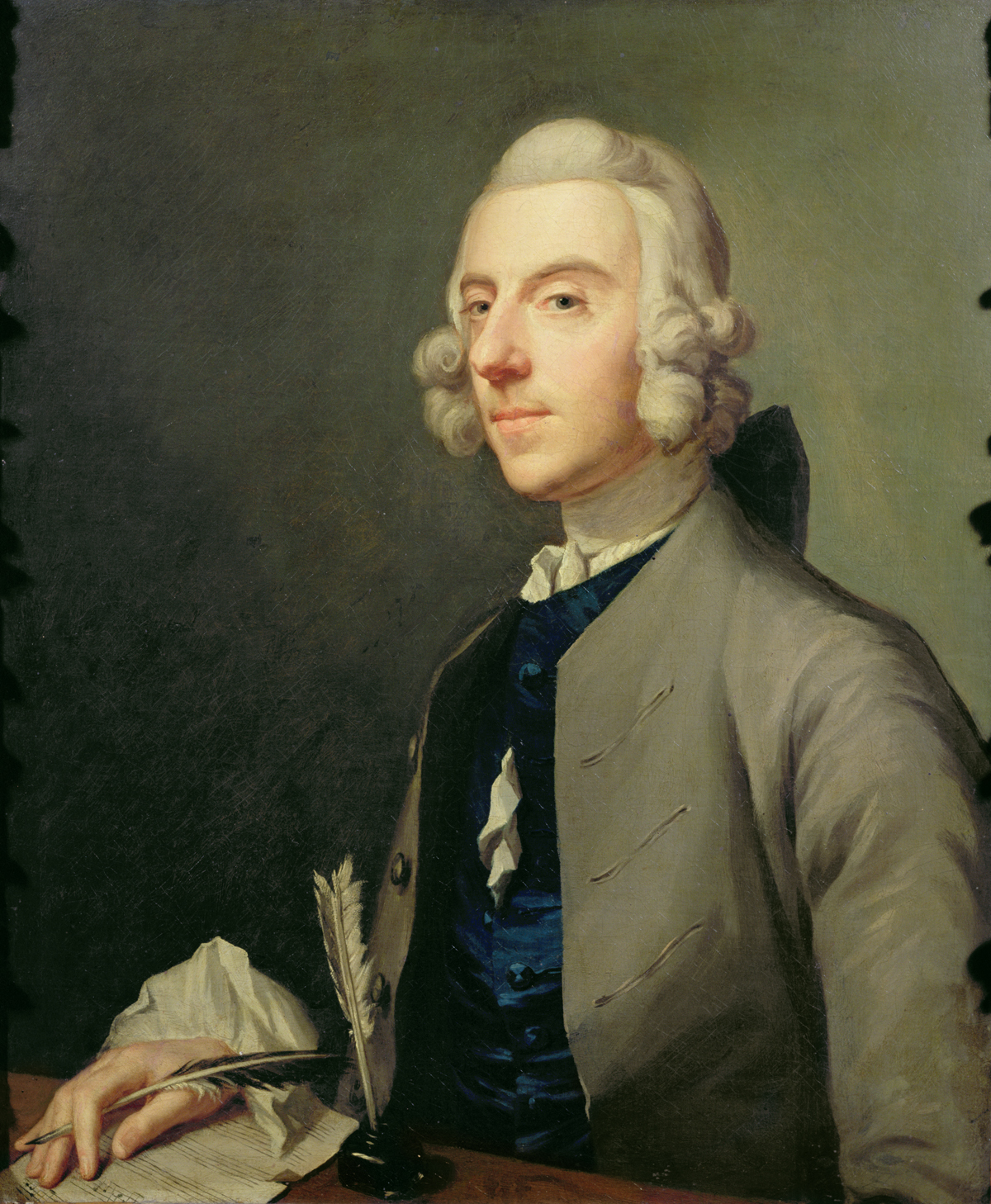
Portrait of Arne by Johan Zoffany

Michael Arne (c. 1740 – 14 January 1786) was an English composer, harpsichordist, organist, singer, and actor. He was the son of the composer Thomas Arne and the soprano Cecilia Young, a member of the famous Young family of musicians of the seventeenth and eighteenth centuries. Like his father, Arne worked primarily as a composer of stage music and vocal art song, contributing little to other genres of music. He wrote several songs for London's pleasure gardens, the most famous of which is Lass with the Delicate Air (1762). A moderately prolific composer, Arne wrote nine operas and collaborated on at least 15 others. His most successful opera, Cymon (1767), enjoyed several revivals during his lifetime and into the early nineteenth century.

== Biography ==
=== Early life and career ===
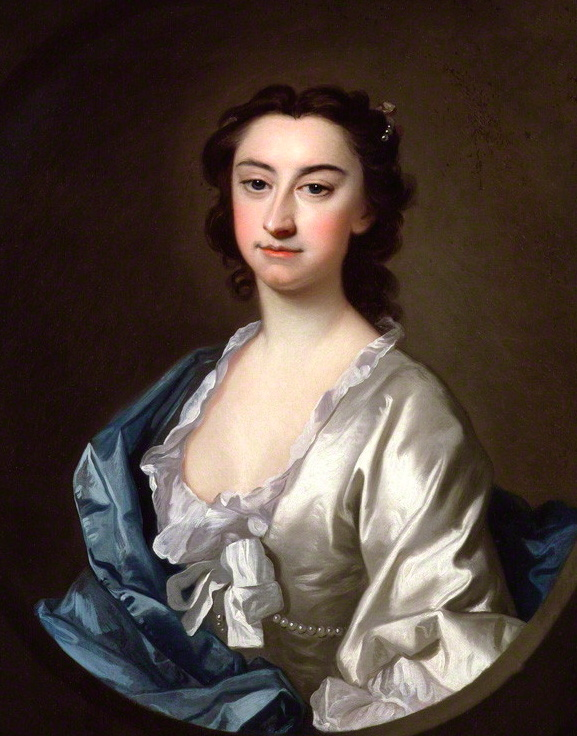
Susanna Maria Cibber (née Arne) (1714 – 1766) was the greatest dramatic actress of the eighteenth-century London stage and was the highest-paid actress in England during her lifetime. On the day of her death Covent Garden and Drury Lane closed their doors as a tribute to her memory.

Michael Arne was born most likely in 1740 in the Covent Garden area of London. Music historian Charles Burney, a close friend of the Arne family, indicates that he was Thomas Arne's natural son but there is some speculation among modern scholars that he may have been adopted. There is no record for Michael Arne at St Paul's, Covent Garden, where most of the Arne family were christened. His father, Thomas Arne, was the most important English theatrical composer of the eighteenth century and is considered the catalyst for the revival of English opera in the early 1730s. His mother, Cecilia Young, was one of the greatest English sopranos of the century and part of the famous Young family of musicians. Both Michael's grandfather, Charles Young, and his great-uncle, Anthony Young, were well known organists and minor composers. His Aunt Isabella was a successful soprano and the wife of composer John Frederick Lampe. His other aunt, Esther Young, was a contralto and the wife of music publisher Charles Jones. His cousins, Isabella, Elizabeth, and Polly, were all successful singers in their own right.

After 1745 Michael spent the majority of his childhood in the care of his aunt and celebrated actress Susannah Maria Cibber due to his mother's frequent illnesses and his father's busy career. It is likely that he received his earliest musical training from his aunt. It was also under her mentorship that he made his stage début as the Page in Thomas Otway’s tragedy The Orphan in the late 1740s. He began his musical career as a singer appearing in Francesco Onofrio Manfredini’s concert on 20 February 1750. This was followed by several singing appearances at the Vauxhall Gardens in the summer of 1750 where his father was the resident composer. However, Michael's career as a vocalist and actor was not prolonged for much longer. Charles Burney wrote that Michael's father "tried to make him a singer, but he was naturally idle and not very quick. However, he acquired a powerful hand on the harpsichord". Michael's obvious lack of enthusiasm for singing prevailed and he focused primarily on music composition and organ and harpsichord performance after the summer of 1750. On 5 February 1751 he gave his first solo organ concert, which featured one of his father's organ concertos; he went on to be the principal exponent of his father's organ works for the next thirty years. Arne also showed an early talent as a composer, and his first collection of vocal art songs entitled The Floweret was published in 1750. The collection included the Scottish-style song "The Highland Laddie", which became popular and as late as 1775 was adapted by Thomas Linley the elder in The Duenna.

=== Mid-life and career ===
The interior of the Theatre Royal, Drury Lane, where Michael Arne primarily worked from 1756 to 1767

During the 1750s and 1760s, Arne worked as an organist and harpsichordist and composer to the theatres and pleasure gardens of London. He married in the 1750s to a now unknown woman who died only a few years into their marriage. From 1756 onwards he composed a considerable amount of music for the stage, much in the same vein as his father. He wrote several successful operas, a significant amount of incidental music for plays, and published several song collections. Several of his songs were written for performance in London's pleasure gardens. One of his best-known songs is Lass with the Delicate Air, which premiered in 1762. In 1764 he collaborated with Jonathan Battishill in setting Richard Rolt’s Almena, which was a theatrical flop but praised for its fine music. The previous year he had met soprano Elizabeth Wright after hearing her perform at Ranelagh Gardens. The two became romantically involved and married in 1766. The following year Elizabeth sang the title role in his opera Cymon. The work used a libretto by David Garrick and was the greatest success of his career. Arne's wife sang in several more of his stage works as well as other productions in leading roles at the Theatre Royal, Drury Lane throughout the 1760s.

In 1766 Arne built a laboratory at Chelsea in order to pursue his interest in alchemy. His hobby quickly turned into an obsession, and he was soon suffering financially due to the expenses of this pursuit. These financial problems caused a considerable amount of stress and tension in his marriage, and Arne ended up in debtor's prison in early 1769. Elizabeth died on 1 May 1769 while he was in prison, and Charles Burney blamed Arne for his wife's early death due to the overwork and stress he had subjected her to. Somewhat humbled, Arne abandoned his pursuit of alchemy and by the early 1770s was financially stable again.

=== Later life and career ===
A drawing of the Royal Opera House, Covent Garden, where Michael Arne primarily worked from 1777 until his death. This drawing was made shortly before the theatre burned down in 1808. Many of Arne's compositions dating from his time there, along with a large amount composed by his father, were destroyed in this fire and are now lost.

Up until this point Arne had spent his entire career working in London. However, in 1771–1772 he traveled to Germany, touring the country in a series of concerts with his pupil Ann Venables. He notably conducted the German premiere of Handel's Messiah in Hamburg on 21 May 1772. After returning to England in the Fall of 1772 he married Miss Venables. He also spent some time working in Dublin, Ireland in 1775–1776. His opera The Maid of the Vale premiered at the Smock Alley Theatre in Dublin on 12 February 1775, and in December 1776 he was engaged by Thomas Ryder to produce Cymon in Dublin. Both productions featured his wife in leading roles and she became a highly popular attraction to the Dublin community.

While in Ireland, Arne began to pursue alchemy once more and he took a house at Clontarf in the hopes of discovering the philosopher's stone. His pursuits again led him into debt, and he was arrested and confined to a Dublin sponging-house. While there he was assisted by the father of Michael Kelly, later a famous tenor, who provided him with a piano in return for young Kelly's daily lesson. In this way Arne was able to teach students and thereby earn money to pay off his creditors.

The Arnes returned to London in 1777, and Michael was engaged as composer at Covent Garden for several seasons. In 1781 he was notably hired to provide a harpsichord accompaniment for Eidophusikon, a display of moving pictures. In 1784–1785 he worked at the Haymarket Theatre as the director and conductor of the Lenten Oratorios. Upon his father's death in 1778, Michael inherited the majority of his father's assets, which included a number of unpublished manuscripts. Included among these were several organ concertos written in 1750s, and in 1784 Michael announced his intention to publish them. However, Michael died in poverty without having done so, leaving his wife destitute. The organ concertos were preserved and later published in 1787 by John Groombridge.

Michael Arne had a daughter Sarah who was a leading singer at Drury Lane from 1795 to 1800. It is uncertain as to whether she was a daughter from his second or third marriage. Records also indicate that he had a daughter known as Jemima who nursed him while he was ill at the end of his life. It is possible that Jemima and Sarah may be the same person, or that they are indeed two different people.

== Works ==
Arne was a moderately prolific composer. He wrote nine operas, collaborated on at least 15 others, wrote a small amount of incidental music for plays, and published seven song collections. He also wrote a small amount of music for the harpsichord and organ, some of which was published in 1761. Like his father, Arne wrote in the popular galante style of the day and utilized both rudiments of English folk music and Italian opera in his compositions. The following is a complete list of his stage works and published works.

=== Stage works ===
- Florizel and Perdita, or The Winter's Tale (21 January 1756, Drury Lane, London)
- The Humorous Lieutenant (10 December 1756, Covent Garden, London)
- Harlequin Sorcerer (1757, Covent Garden, London)
- Harlequin's Invasion (31 December 1759, Drury Lane, London)
- The Heiress or the Antigallican (21 May 1759, Drury Lane, London)
- Edgar and Emmeline (31 January 1761 Drury Lane, London)
- A Midsummer Night's Dream (23 November 1763, Drury Lane, London)
- Hymen (23 January 1764, Drury Lane, London)
- Almena (2 November 1764, Drury Lane, London)
- Cymon (2 January 1767, Drury Lane, London)
- Linco's Travels (6 April 1767, Drury Lane, London)
- Tom Jones (14 January 1769, Covent Garden, London)
- The Maid of the Vale (15 February 1775, Smock Alley Theatre, Dublin)
- Emperor of the Moon (22 March 1777, Patagonian, London)
- The Fairy Tale (18 July 1777, Haymarket, London)
- The Fathers, or the Good-natured Man (30 November 1778, Covent Garden, London)
- Love in a Village (13 February 1779, Covent Garden, London)
- All alive at Jersey (22 May 1779, Sadler's Wells, London)
- The Conscious Lovers (27 September 1779, Covent Garden, London)
- The Belle's Stratagem (22 February 1780, Covent Garden, London)
- The Artifice (14 April 1780, Drury Lane, London)
- The Choice of Harlequin, or the Indian Chief (26 December 1781 Covent Garden, London)
- Vertumnus and Pomona (21 February 1782, Covent Garden, London)
- The Positive Man (16 March 1782, Covent Garden, London)
- The Maid of the Mill (25 September 1782, Covent Garden, London)
- The Capricious Lady (17 January 1783, Covent Garden, London)
- Tristram Shandy (26 April 1783, Covent Garden, London)

=== Song collections ===
Arne wrote close to two hundred vocal songs during his career, the majority of which were written for performance at London's pleasure gardens. Many of these songs were published in anthologies, but at least some fifty or more songs were never published.

- The Floweret (London, 1750)
- The Violet (London, 1756)
- A Favourite Collection of English Songs (London, 1757)
- New Songs and Ballads (London, 1765)
- New Songs sung by Miss Wright at Vauxhall (London, c1765)
- A Collection of Favourite Songs sung by Mrs. Arne (London, 1773)
- Ranelagh Songs (London, 1780)

=== Other ===
- Lessons for the Harpsichord, (London, 1761)
