= Charles Young (musician) =

English organist and composer (1686–1758)

Charles Young (September 1686 – 12 December 1758) was an English organist and composer. He was part of a well-known English family of musicians that included several professional singers and organists during the seventeenth and eighteenth centuries.

== Biography ==
Charles Young was born sometime during September 1686 in the Covent Garden area of London and was baptised on 7 October of the same year. Born into a musical family, his initial studies were with his father alongside his elder brother Anthony Young, who would also become a successful organist and minor composer. He became a chorister at St Paul's Cathedral in the late 1690s where he sang for over a decade. In 1713, Young was appointed organist of All Hallows, Barking-by-the-Tower, where he remained until his death in 1758. His grandson, Charles John Frederick Lampe, replaced him as organist at All Hallows after his death.

As a composer, Young wrote music mostly for the Church of England. He was not prolific, producing only a handful of anthems and some organ preludes. He also composed a few vocal art songs. His reputation lies more on his skills as an organist and he was regarded as one of the finest players in England during the eighteenth century.

Several of Young's children went on to have successful careers. His eldest daughter Cecilia Young (1712-1789) was one of the greatest English sopranos of the eighteenth century and the wife of composer Thomas Arne. Their son and Charles's grandson, Michael Arne, was a successful composer. His daughter Isabella was also a successful soprano and the wife of composer John Frederick Lampe, and his daughter Esther was a well known contralto and wife to Charles Jones, one of the largest music publishers in England during the eighteenth century. Young's only son, Charles, was a clerk at the Treasury, whose daughters, Isabella, Elizabeth, and Polly followed in the foot steps of their aunts to become successful singers.
