= Polly Young =

Soprano, composer and harpsichordist

Polly Young (also known as Mary Young, Maria Young, Polly Barthélemon and Maria Barthélemon) (7 July 1749 – 20 September 1799) was an English soprano, composer and keyboard player. She was part of a well-known English family of musicians that included several professional singers and organists during the 17th and 18th centuries. Her husband, François-Hippolyte Barthélémon, was a composer and violinist, and their daughter, Cecilia Maria Barthélemon, was also a composer and opera singer.

== Biography ==
Polly Young was born in Covent Garden, London on 7 July 1749. Her father, Charles Young, was a clerk at the Treasury. She was the youngest of three daughters, her oldest sister Isabella becoming a successful soprano and her other sister Elizabeth a successful contralto. Both her grandfather, Charles Young, and her great-uncle, Anthony Young, were notable organists and composers. She also had three famous aunts who were all notable singers. Her aunt Cecilia (1712–1789) was one of the greatest English sopranos of the 18th century and the wife of composer Thomas Arne. Their son, Michael Arne, was also a successful composer. Her aunt Isabella was a successful soprano and the wife of composer John Frederick Lampe, while her aunt Esther was a well-known contralto and wife to Charles Jones, a successful music publisher in England during the 18th century.

Young was a child prodigy and began performing as a singer and harpsichordist at a young age. In 1755, at the age of 6, she travelled to Ireland with her aunt Cecilia and her husband Thomas Arne. While there she performed for Dublin audiences in Arne's opera Eliza, impressing them with her singing "perfectly in Time and Tune". The trip, however, was somewhat ill-fated as the Arnes' marital problems came to a head, partly arising from a dispute over Young's education, and Thomas left his wife. Young remained in Ireland with Mrs Arne for the next seven years where she studied music with her aunt and performed in concert and on the stage in Dublin. In 1758 Mrs. Arne's friend Mrs Delany wrote "the race of Youngs are born songsters and musicians" after hearing Young play the harpsichord. She notably portrayed the role of Ariel in William Shakespeare's The Tempest at the Smock Alley Theatre in 1761. Playwright John O'Keeffe was particularly taken by her performance and complimented her on her "charming face and small figure".

In September 1762 Young returned to London to make her début on the London stage at the Covent Garden theatre where she sang and played the harpsichord between acts. The Theatrical Review commented on her charming, innocent appearance: "Her performance on the harpsichord, is equal to her excellence in singing". Young continued to perform in this way at Covent Garden for the next two seasons and then went on to sing minor parts with the Italian opera company at the King's Theatre in the autumn of 1764. While there she met the French violinist and composer François-Hippolyte Barthélémon, who was the leader of the company's orchestra. The two became romantically involved soon after and Young married Barthélemon in December 1766.

Following her marriage, Young mostly appeared in performances with her husband at the Italian opera, in oratorios and in performances at the pleasure gardens. Young also began to compose and publish music; most notably a set of six sonatas for harpsichord or piano and violin was published in 1776 under the name Maria Barthélemon. The Barthélemons travelled to Ireland to perform fairly often and had a highly successful tour of Europe in 1776–77. While on tour, Young sang in her husband's oratorio Jefte in Florence and gave concerts before Marie Antoinette and her sister Maria Carolina of Austria, the Queen of Naples. The Barthélemons' daughter, Cecilia Maria, also sang in these performances. The family continued to prosper after returning to London in 1777, giving numerous lauded concerts in venues throughout the city.

In the 1780s the Barthélemons' careers became less successful and they found work increasingly hard to get. Young complained in a letter to The Morning Post on 2 November 1784 that she was refused engagements, styling herself "an English Woman, of an unblemished reputation". Regardless, the Barthélemons managed to scrape by and were never outside of the important music circles in London. Haydn visited the couple while he was in England in 1792. In May of that year he accompanied Young in airs by Handel and Sacchini in a London concert.

In 1786 Young published a set of six English and Italian songs, Op. 2. Subsequently the Barthélemons began attending the chapel at the Asylum for Female Orphans which was near their home in Vauxhall. While there they became heavily influenced by the Swedenborgian preacher Duché. This influence led Young to compose and publish a number of hymns and anthems. In 1795 she composed three hymns and three anthems (Op. 3) for use at the Magdalen Chapels and the Asylum. That same year she composed The Weaver's Prayer for a benefit concert that raised money to help unemployed weavers and an ode on the preservation of the king (Op. 5) that used words by Baroness Nolcken, another Swedenborgian.

== Works ==
- 6 Sonatas for Keyboard and Violin, Op.1 (1776)
- 6 English and Italian Songs, Op.2 (1786)
- 3 Hymns and 3 Anthems, Op.3 (1795)
- The Weaver's Prayer, Op.4 (1795)
- Ode on the Preservation of the King, Op.5 (1795)
