= Isabella Lampe =

Isabella Lampe (also Isabella Young) (December 1715, London – 5 January 1795, London) was an English operatic soprano and the wife of composer John Frederick Lampe. She sang primarily in works by her husband and was part of a well-known English family of musicians, the Young family, that included several professional singers and organists during the 17th and 18th centuries.

== Biography ==
Born with the name Isabella Young sometime during December 1715 in the Covent Garden area of London, she was baptised the following 3 January 1716. Both her father, Charles Young, and his brother, Anthony Young, were well known organists and minor composers. The third child of four, Isabella's older sister Cecilia was one of the greatest English sopranos of the 18th century and the wife of composer Thomas Arne. Her younger sister Esther was a successful contralto and her older brother Charles was a clerk at the Royal Treasury. Isabella's nieces, Isabella, Elizabeth, and Polly, followed in the footsteps of their aunts to become successful singers.

Along with her sisters, Isabella's earliest musical training was with her father but she eventually studied privately with other teachers. She made her professional stage debut in 1733 in a small singing role at the Theatre Royal, Drury Lane where she appeared several more times in small roles for the next two years. This was followed by several concert appearances and she did not return to the stage again until 1737 when she sang the heroine Margery in John Frederick Lampe’s burlesque opera The Dragon of Wantley. A tremendous success, Isabella portrayed the role for several seasons in more than 100 performances. In the middle of the production's lengthy run she married the composer and subsequently created roles in all his stage works, including Thisbe in Pyramus and Thisbe (1745). Most of these productions were staged at the Covent Garden Theatre and the Lampes had a long association with that venue.

In 1748 the Lampes went to Dublin and Isabella appeared for two seasons at the Smock Alley Theatre, including portraying the role of Coridon in Handel's Acis and Galatea. She also sang in numerous concerts and at the Marlborough Green pleasure gardens. In November 1750 the Lampes went to Edinburgh and, according to music historian Charles Burney, were soon "settled very much to the satisfaction of the patrons of Music in that city". Sadly, Lampe died there rather suddenly of a fever in July 1751 and Isabella went back to London.

After returning to England, Isabella continued to appear in productions at Covent Garden for the next twenty five years. She portrayed mostly roles that her husband had written for her in revivals of his works but also appeared in some new roles, mostly in musical afterpieces. Towards the end of her time with the company she sang mainly as a member of the chorus, often with her younger sister Esther. Her last season with the company was the 1775–1776 season.

Following the death of her father in 1758, Isabella's son Charles John Frederick Lampe took over his grandfather's post as organist at All Hallows, Barking-by-the-Tower. Her daughter-in-law sang for a time as Mrs Lampe at the pleasure gardens and Sadler's Wells Theatre.

Isabella died at the age of 79 in London on 5 January 1795.
