= Susannah Maria Cibber =

English singer and actress (1714–1766)

Susannah Cibber
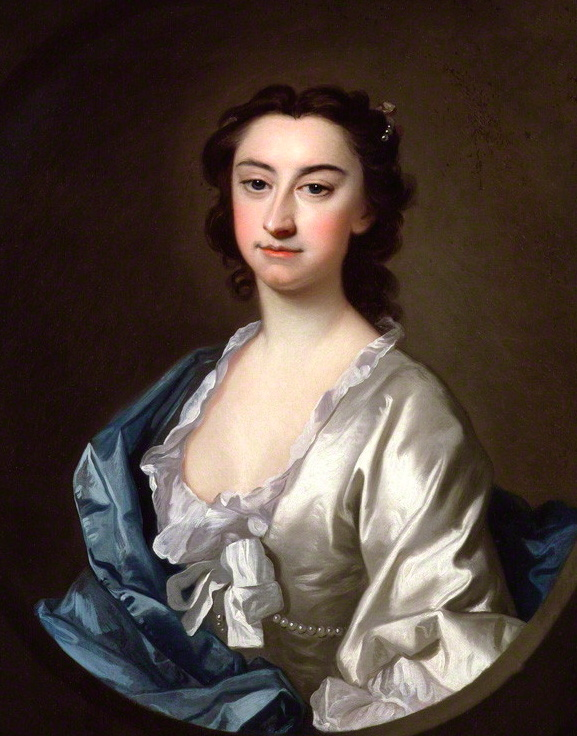
- Portrait by Thomas Hudson, 1749
- Born: February 1714; London, England
- Died: 30 January 1766 (aged 51)
- Children: 2

Susannah Maria Cibber (née Arne; February 1714 – 30 January 1766) was an English singer and actress. She was the sister of the composer Thomas Arne. Although she began her career as a soprano, her voice lowered in the early part of her career to that of a true contralto. She was admired for her ability to move her audiences emotionally, both as an actress and as a singer. Possessing an expressive and agile singing voice with a wide vocal range, Cibber was an immensely popular singer even if at times her voice was criticized for a lack of polished technique.

Charles Burney wrote of her singing that "by a natural pathos, and perfect conception of the words, she often penetrated the heart, when others, with infinitely greater voice and skill, could only reach the ear". Cibber was particularly admired by Handel, who wrote numerous parts especially for her including the contralto arias in his 1741 oratorio Messiah, the role of Micah in Samson, the role of Lichas in Hercules and the role of David in Saul, among others. In the mid-1730s she began appearing in plays in addition to operas and oratorios. She became the greatest dramatic actress of the 18th-century-London stage and at the time of her death was the highest-paid actress in England.

== Biography ==
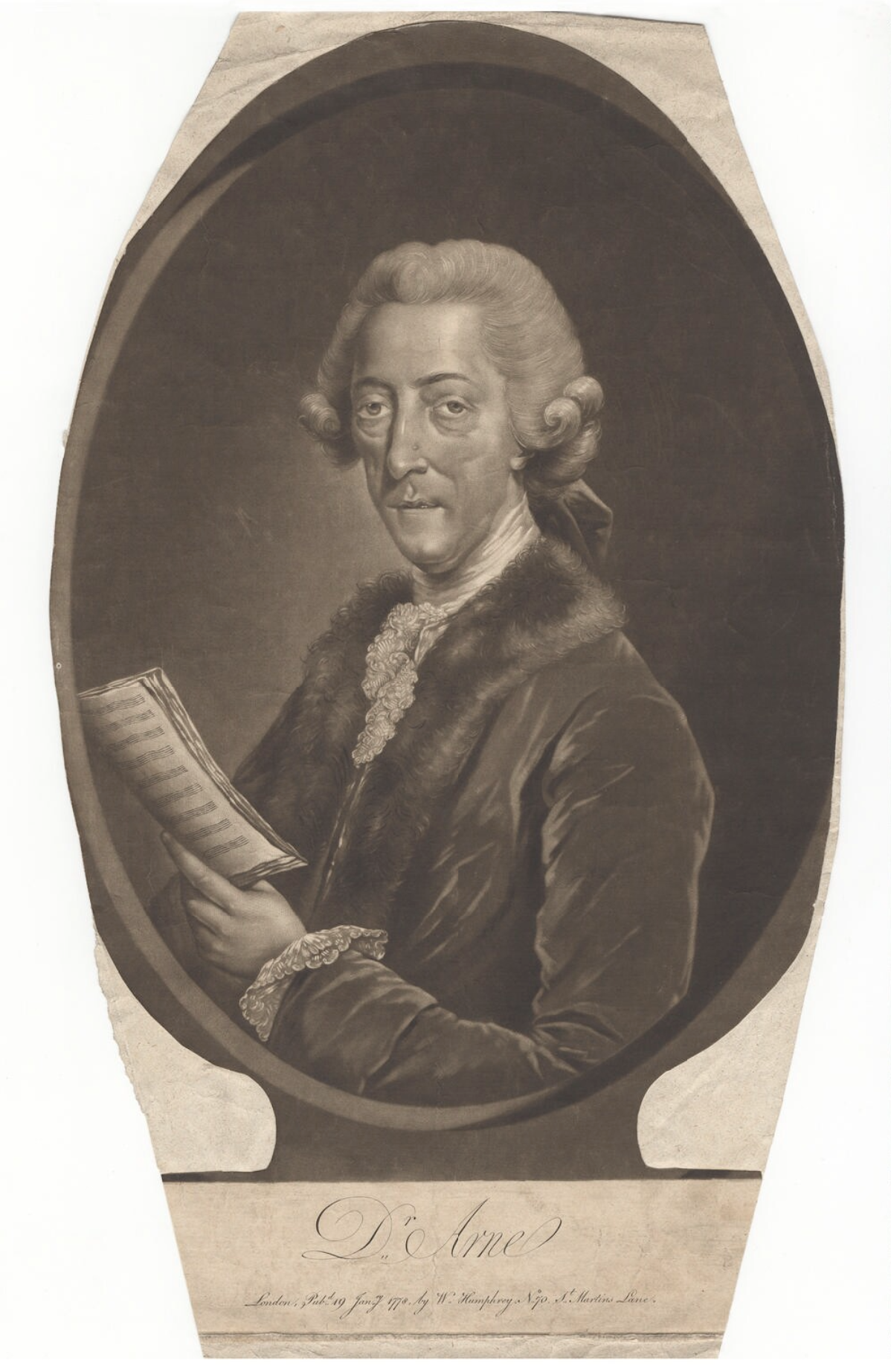
Portrait of Cibber's older brother, Thomas Arne. He was a highly prolific composer of music for the stage and is considered the most significant figure in 18th-century English theatre music. Susannah and Thomas enjoyed a close lifelong relationship and Arne was the most constant presence in her life.

=== Early life ===
Susannah Maria Arne was born in the Covent Garden area of London to Thomas and Anne Arne; her father and grandfather were upholsterers and office holders in the Worshipful Company of Upholders. As a child, she studied singing with her brother Thomas, who would later become one of the most important composers of the era and an important part of Cibber's career as a singer. Her other brother, Richard, also worked as a singer and actor but never achieved the same level of success as his siblings.

=== Career, marriages and scandal ===
On 13 March 1732, she made her professional debut in the title role of John Frederick Lampe's setting of Henry Carey's Amelia to positive reviews, at the Little Theatre. Her performances over the following two years included roles in Handel's Acis and Galatea and her brother's Rosamund, The Opera of Operas and Dido and Aeneas.

The year 1733 proved to be a critical year for Susannah Arne. She met Handel while rehearsing and performing the role of Jael in the original production of his oratorio Deborah; this was the beginning of a close and lifelong friendship. Handel patiently taught her parts note by note as she could not read music. Also that year her name appeared in the playbills offering entr'acte songs "by popular demand" at the Haymarket, performances which became very popular. During the 1733–1744 acting season the actor Theophilus Cibber and his theatre company were introduced to the young Susannah.

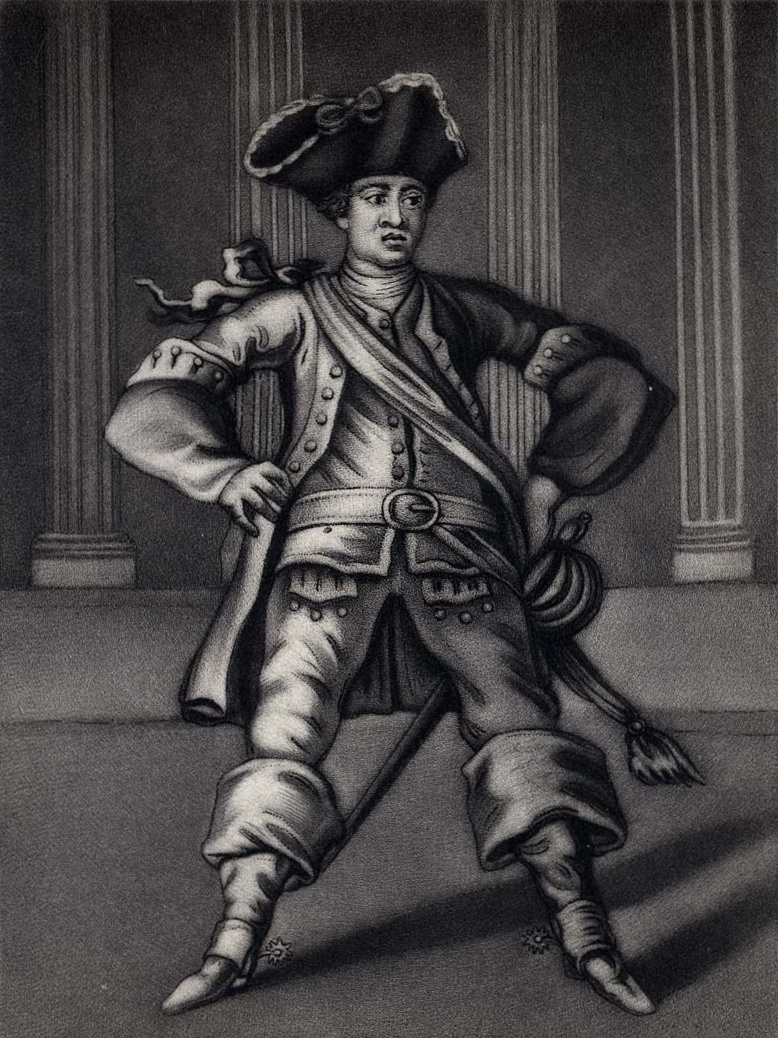
A portrait of Theophilus Cibber in the role of Ancient Pistol, a character who appears in several of Shakespeare's plays. In addition to often appearing together on the stage prior to their divorce, Susannah and Theophilus wrote several plays together, which were ultimately not that successful.

In April 1734 Susannah Arne married Theophilus Cibber. He was the son of playwright, theatre manager and poet laureate Colley Cibber, whose company of players was in residence at Drury Lane at that time. The marriage proved beneficial to Susannah's career and position in the London theatre, as she became a regular at that house for many years, performing under the name Mrs Cibber. Even more important was the attention of her father-in-law, who, recognizing in Susannah the makings of a great tragic actress, trained her. Susannah received hours of acting tuition from her new father-in-law and he helped teach her the vocal intonations and tragic gestures that shaped her into the most celebrated tragedienne of her time. Further, adopting a 'Cibberian identity' proved very advantageous for Susannah's career. Public audiences began to view her as the young ingénue of the Cibber acting dynasty, which in turn helped land her leading roles. Her brother Thomas also benefited from the marriage as he became house composer at Drury Lane and wrote music for a number of plays and pantomimes over the next several years.

In 1736 Cibber made her début as a dramatic actress in the title role of Aaron Hill's Zara, with great success. She went on to portray numerous Shakespearean roles to critical acclaim, which she later continued to perform with David Garrick. In 1737 a much noted dispute with Kitty Clive over the part of Polly in The Beggar's Opera erupted and inspired a satire, The Beggar's Pantomime, or The Contending Columbine. The following year, Cibber portrayed the role of David in the original production of Handel's oratorio Saul and she appeared in the world premiere of her brother's immensely popular masque Comus.

Cibber's marriage was not a happy one. He was reportedly abusive and a profligate spender, and even began selling off some of his wife's wardrobe and personal effects to deter creditors. In order to pay rent, the Cibbers took in a wealthy tenant, William Sloper (who would later sit in Parliament for Great Bedwyn). The resultant relationship between these three people led to a notorious lawsuit in 1738, in which Cibber accused Sloper of "Assaulting, Ravishing and Carnally Knowing" his wife. Various versions of the scandal suggest that all three may have been involved in a ménage à trois. One account states that Cibber forced his wife at gunpoint to sleep with Sloper; another places a spy in a closet at the scene of one of their trysts, in order to gather testimony for the lawsuit. In any event, Theophilus Cibber was awarded a paltry £10 in damages. The following year, he brought a second case against Sloper for "detaining" his wife. In fact, Cibber and Sloper had run off together, and had a daughter, Susannah Maria (Molly). This time Theophilus Cibber was awarded £500. His intention, going into the lawsuit against his estranged wife and her new lover, was to shame Cibber as a cruel, unfaithful wife. However, as she was pregnant at the time of the trial, she shifted the public perception of herself to being an innocent woman, merely the victim of her husband's cruelty and greed.

A 1727 portrait of George Frideric Handel by Balthasar Denner. Music historian Charles Burney, who was Thomas Arne's pupil, says that Handel "was very fond of Mrs Cibber, whose voice and manners had softened his severity for her want of musical knowledge".

In 1740, Cibber sang in the world premiere of her brother's masque Alfred. She moved to Dublin, and in the autumn of 1741 for a busy season at the Aungier Street Theatre with her good friend and mentor, the actor James Quinn. Handel joined her there, and she performed in several concerts with him conducting including performances of Acis and Galatea, Esther, and Alexander's Feast. She also joined the premiere performance of Handel's Messiah on 13 April 1742, singing the contralto solos. Legend has it that Dr Patrick Delany, the chancellor of Christ Church Cathedral, upon hearing her sing "He was despised", proclaimed "Woman, for this be all thy sins forgiven thee!" On 21 and 28 July she sang a duo recital with her sister-in-law, the soprano Cecilia Arne (née Young). The Dublin notices were full of praise for Cibber for both her acting and her singing. Thomas Sheridan wrote:

"What then must [the mighty force of oratorical expression] be, when conveyed to the heart with all the superadded powers and charms of musick? No person of sensibility, who has had the good fortune to hear Mrs Cibber sing the oratorio of the Messiah, will find it very difficult to give credit to accounts of the most wonderful effects produced from so powerful a union."

Eventually the scandal surrounding Cibber died down, and she returned to the London stage in autumn 1742. The first role she performed upon her return was that of Desdemona, from Othello. The tragic nature of her character helped perpetuate the public's view of her as a 'wronged wife', a persona she adopted following the well-documented breakdown of her marriage. Following this, she continued adding many more tragic roles to her repertoire.

Her home in London became a salon of sorts on Sunday evenings. Burney, referring to these evenings, wrote that he found himself "in a constellation of wits, poets, actors, and men of letters", including Handel, Garrick, and Arne. She was also engaged by Handel for his oratorio season, creating the role of Micah in Samson. In 1744–1745 she continued to sing for Handel, now at the King's Theatre in The Haymarket. Her roles included Jael in Deborah, Lichas in Hercules and David in Saul, and she sang in the oratorios L'Allegro, Alexander's Feast and Messiah. Handel also wrote the part of Daniel in Belshazzar for her but, due to illness, she never sang the role.

In 1744, Cibber became David Garrick's leading lady at Drury Lane, the theatre managed by her father-in-law, and their partnership and friendship (reflected in letters) continued until her death. Garrick directed her, alongside actor Spranger Barry, in a successful adaptation of Shakespeare's Romeo and Juliet, written by Garrick himself. Garrick's version was well received by eighteenth-century audiences, as it omitted many 'indecent' moments, and added to the tragic tomb scene between Romeo and Juliet, whereupon the characters have a final conversation, after Romeo has poisoned himself. However, after a brief falling-out between Garrick and Cibber, she and Barry took their version of Romeo and Juliet to Garrick's rival, John Rich, at Covent Garden. This prompted Garrick to cast himself and young actress George Anne Bellamy in a rival version of the same show, performed across the street in Drury Lane, to run concurrently with Cibber and Barry's version. For twelve nights, beginning on 28 September 1750, rival versions of Romeo and Juliet ran in London, thrilling audiences. Both shows received much publicity, and audiences often watched both versions, to decide who they thought were the superior star-crossed lovers. Cibber fell ill on the thirteenth night, ending the competition between the two shows. Eventually, she and Garrick reconciled, and she returned to Drury Lane in 1753.

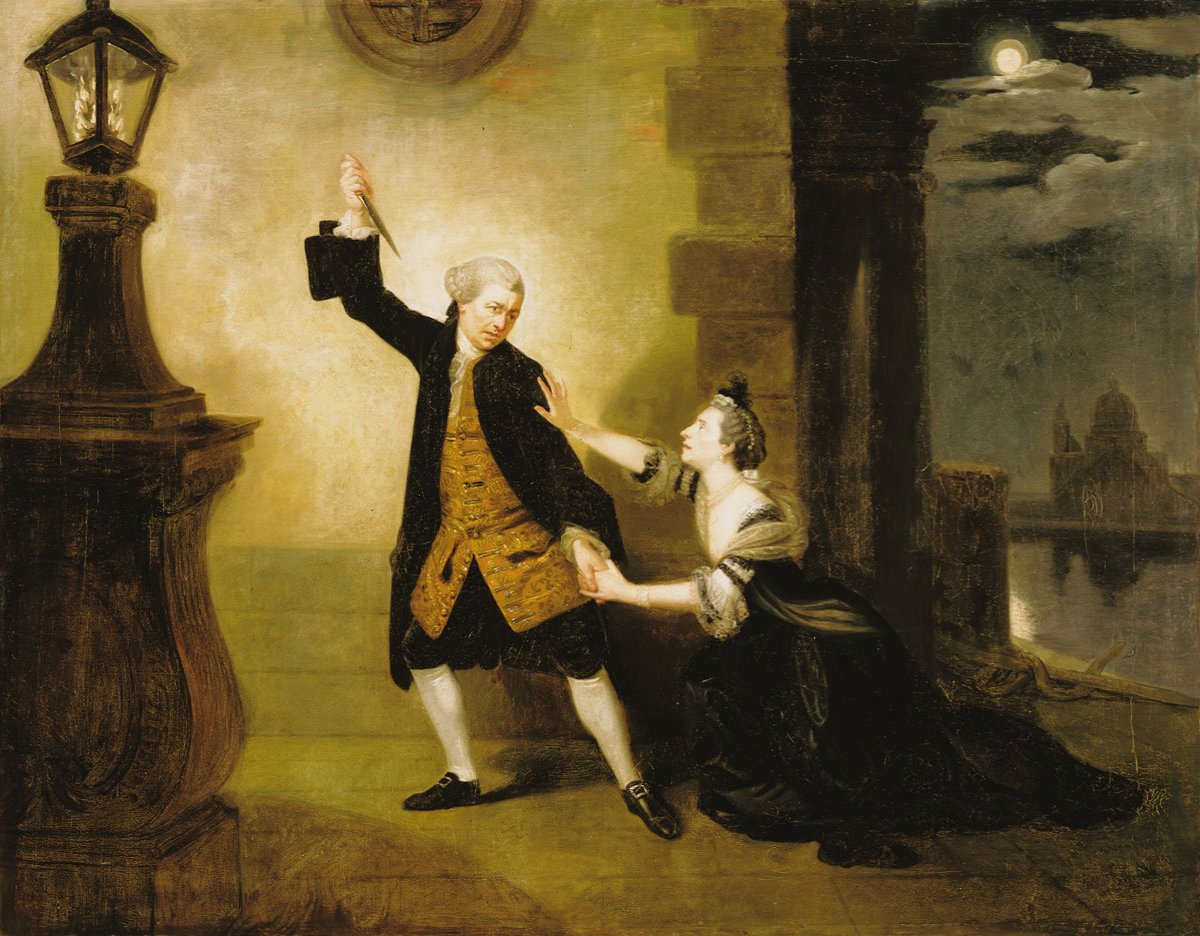
Venice Preserv'd by Johan Zoffany, 1763. Cibber is shown as Belvidera, acting alongside David Garrick.

From 1744 to 1765 she added numerous dramatic roles to her repertory and was, after Garrick, the highest paid thespian in London. Contemporary reviews, dedications, letters and poems all refer to her ability to affect the listener deeply. She wrote a masque which was performed in Covent Garden in 1751. Also, during this time, Susannah became the primary caregiver and teacher for her young nephew, Michael Arne. The boy's mother, Cecilia Arne, suffered from recurring health problems and this, compounded with Thomas's busy work schedule, made it impossible for his parents to care for him. Under Susannah's guidance, Michael started out as a stage actor at Drury Lane before he reached the age of ten. He later followed in his father's footsteps to become a successful composer.

== Children ==
One source states that she had a son and a daughter, who both died young, by William Sloper.

== Death ==
Susannah died on 30 January 1766 and was buried in the north cloisters of Westminster Abbey. On the day of her death, Covent Garden and Drury Lane closed their doors as a tribute to one of their finest actresses and singers. Garrick, upon hearing of her death, said: "Then tragedy dies with her".

The poet George Keate wrote in that year "A Poem to the Memory of the Celebrated Mrs Cibber":

... Closed are those eyes which knew each varied art,
And could my meaning with such force inspire;
Call tears of pity from the melting heart,
Freeze with wild horror, or with rapture fire! ...

== Sources ==
- Mary Nash The Provoked Wife: the life and times of Susannah Cibber (1977)
- Donnelly, Molly (2001). "Susannah Maria Arne". In Sadie, Stanley; Tyrrell, John (eds.). The New Grove Dictionary of Music and Musicians (2nd ed.). London: Macmillan. ISBN 978-1-56159-239-5.
