= Cecilia Young =

English soprano

Cecilia Young (also Cecilia Arne) (January 1712 – 6 October 1789) was one of the greatest English sopranos of the eighteenth century, the wife of composer Thomas Arne, and the mother of composer Michael Arne. According to the music historian Charles Burney, she had "a good natural voice and a fine shake [and] had been so well taught, that her style of singing was infinitely superior to that of any other English woman of her time". She was part of a well-known English family of musicians that included several professional singers and organists. Young enjoyed a large amount of success through her close association with George Frideric Handel. She appeared in several of his oratorios and operas including the premieres of Ariodante (1735), Alcina (1735), Alexander's Feast (1736) and Saul (1739).

== Biography ==
=== Early life, education, and early career ===
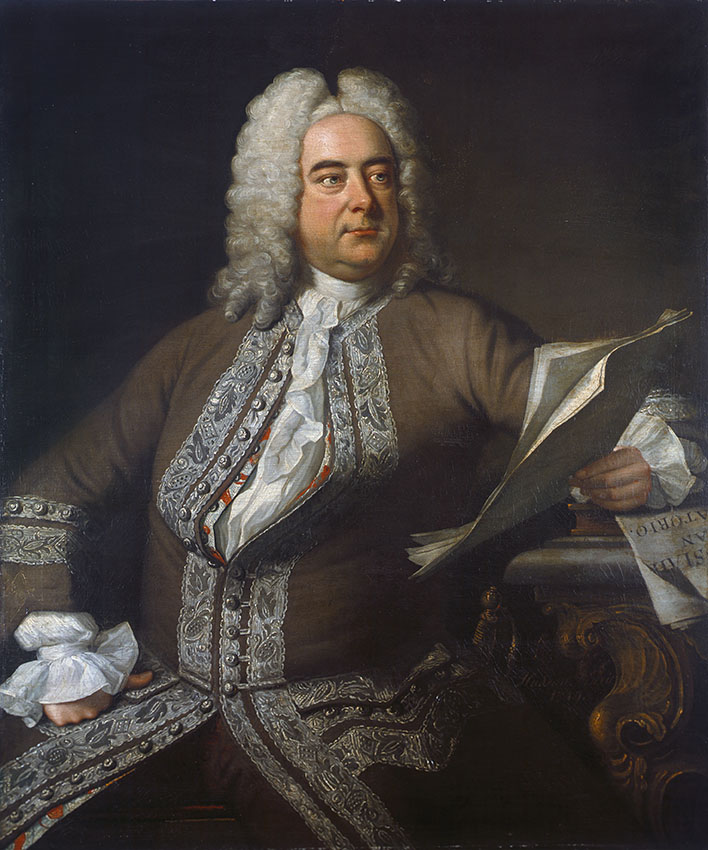
George Frideric Handel, a close friend of Cecilia and her husband Thomas Arne

Cecilia Young was born in London sometime during January 1712 and was baptised on the following 7 February. Born into the well known Young family of musicians, both her father, Charles Young, and his brother, Anthony Young, were well known organists and minor composers. The eldest of four, Cecilia's younger sisters, Isabella and Esther, were also successful singers. Although her younger brother Charles was a clerk at the Treasury and not a professional musician, his daughters Isabella, Elizabeth, and Polly followed in the foot steps of their aunts to become successful singers.

Young's earliest musical studies were under her father but she eventually became a pupil of Francesco Geminiani. She made her professional singing debut in a series of concerts during March 1730. She made her opera debut two years later in a production by John Frederick Lampe, her brother-in-law, and J. S. Smith. She appeared in several more of their operas over the next two years. Through her association with Lampe, Young met the young composer and her future husband Thomas Arne. She appeared in his first opera Rosamund on 7 March 1733.

In 1734 Young met George Frideric Handel after the composer heard her in concert. Impressed with the young singer, he immediately decided to hire her to portray the role of Dalinda in his upcoming opera Ariodante. The work premiered at the Covent Garden Theatre on 8 January 1735 and Young's performance, along with the rest of the cast, was enthusiastically received. This was the beginning of a fruitful association between Young and Handel which would last over the next decade. She appeared in several of his productions including the role of Morgana in the world premier of Alcina (1735) and in the world premiers of the oratorios Alexander's Feast (1736) and Saul (1739). She also sang the title role in the first London performance of Athalia and appeared in several revivals of the composers works during the early 1740s.

=== Mid life and career ===
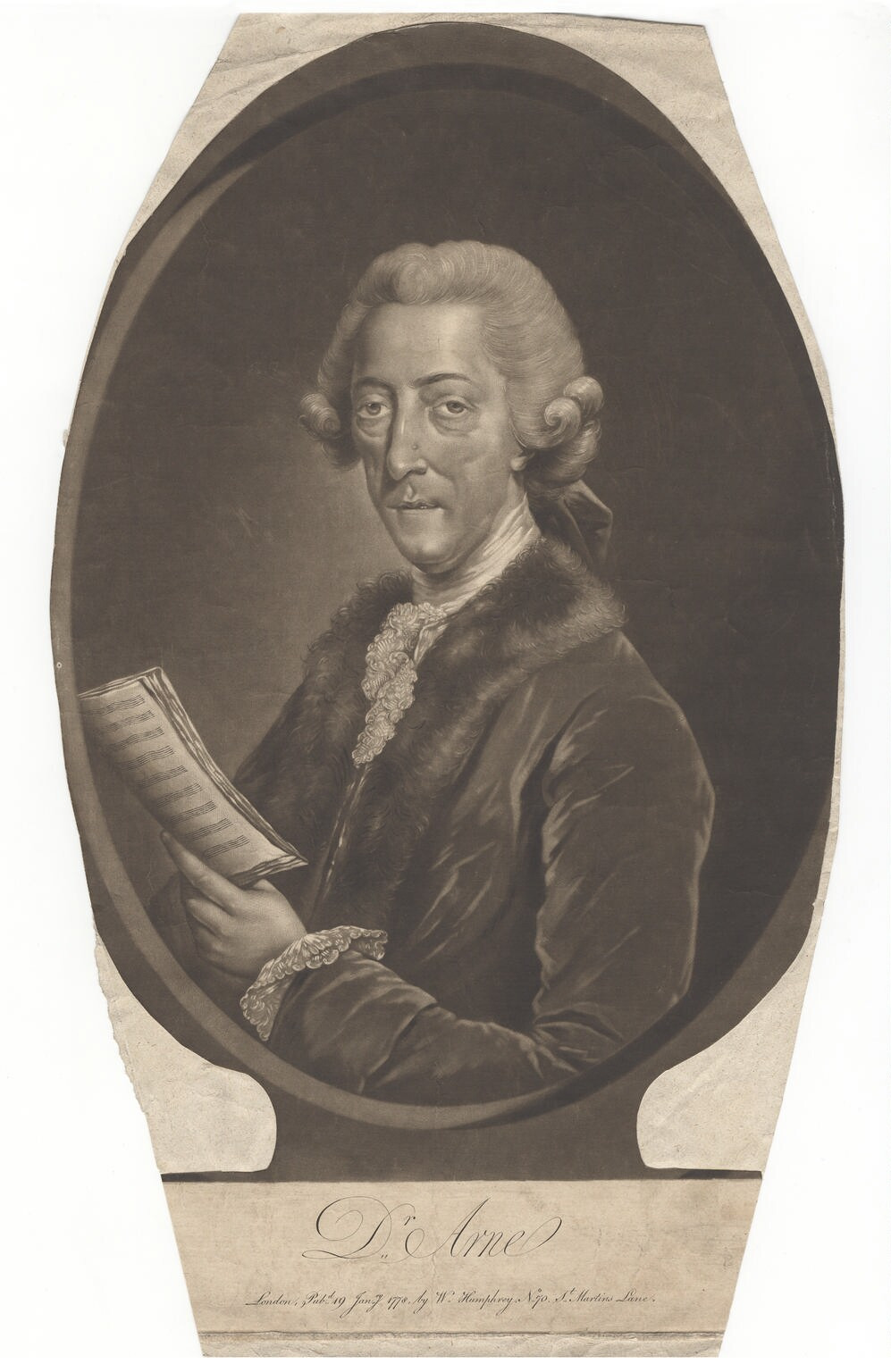
Thomas Augustine Arne

By 1736, Young was romantically involved with composer Thomas Arne. Her father, however, was opposed to their marrying as Arne was a Roman Catholic and did not follow the teachings of the Church of England. Against her father's will, Young married Arne on 15 March 1737. After their marriage, she appeared in several of her husband's stage productions including the immensely popular masques Comus (1738), Alfred (1740), and The Judgement of Paris (1742). Young's singing and her strong acting skills became indispensable assets to her husband and she contributed greatly to his first enduring successes.

In either late 1740 or early 1741, Young gave birth to her only child Michael Arne who would grow up to be a composer. Up until this time, Young's career had been confined almost solely to London. However, this changed when her sister-in-law and celebrated actress/singer Susannah Arne moved to Dublin in December 1741 to avoid the scandal surrounding her recently failed marriage to actor Theophilus Cibber. Susannah began performing in Dublin with Handel in the spring of 1742. She most notably sang the contralto solos in the first performance of Handel's Messiah on 13 April. Their success inspired Thomas Arne and Cecilia to try their luck in Dublin and they soon arrived, along with tenor Thomas Lowe, the following June. The Arnes stayed for two seasons in Dublin and staged a number of Handel oratorios in addition to several of Thomas's works. Young sang in most of these concerts including the premiere of her husband's first oratorio The Death of Abel at Dublin's Smock Alley Theatre on 18 February 1744. Young also gave a solo concert in Dublin that year which was received enthusiastically.

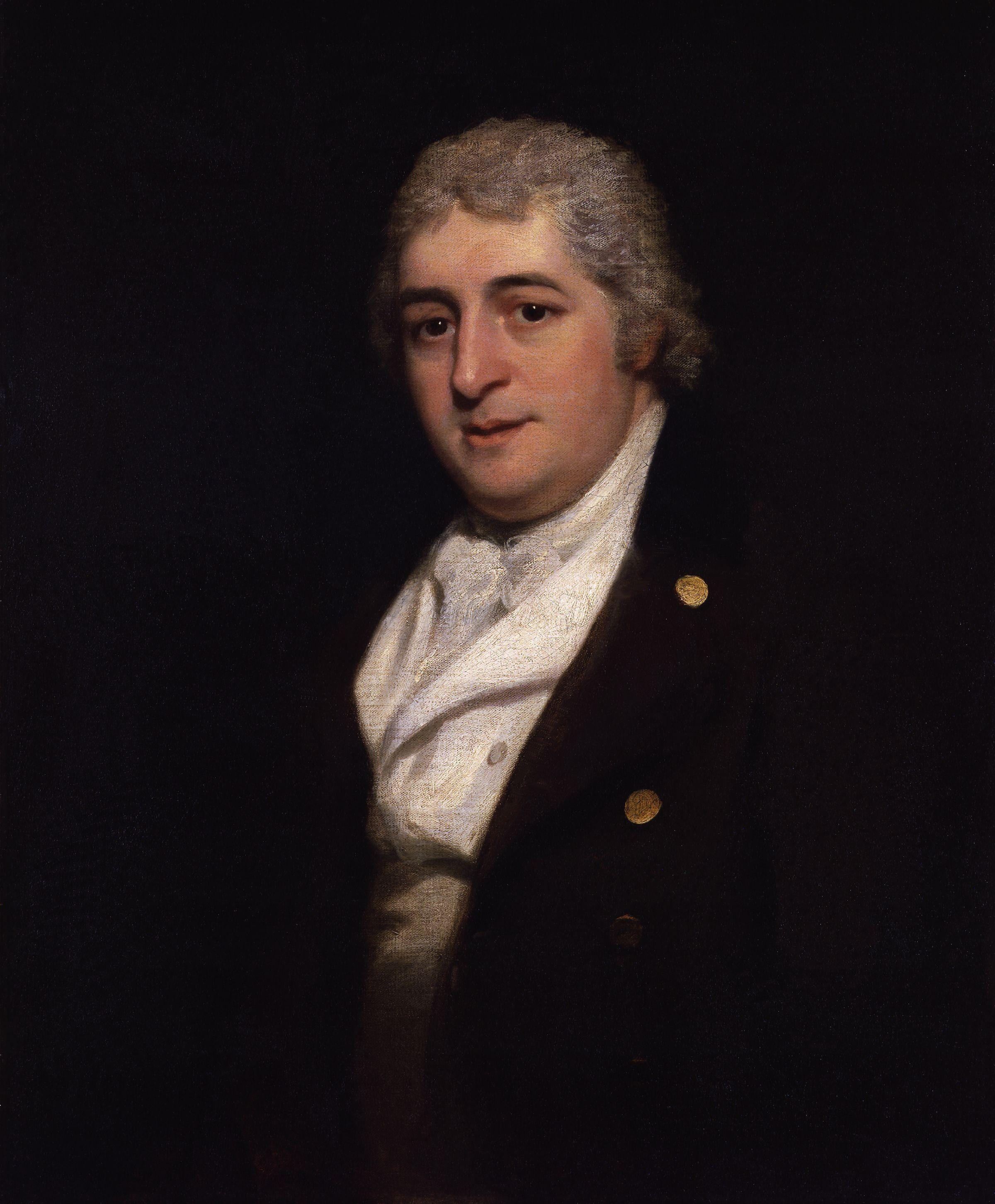
Musician and dramatist Charles Dibdin was a friend and colleague of Thomas and Cecilia Arne. He said, "Mrs Arne was deliciously captivating. She knew nothing in singing or in nature but sweetness and simplicity."

The Arnes returned to London in August 1744. Shortly thereafter, Thomas Arne began a long and fruitful association with concerts in London's pleasure gardens when vocal performance became one of the regular forms of entertainment. He became the appointed official composer for Vauxhall in 1745 and also presented material at the Marylebone and Ranelagh Gardens. Young performed in many of these concerts in 1745 and 1746 including Colin and Phoebe which, according to Charles Burney, was "constantly encored every night for more than three months".

=== Later life and career ===
In 1746 Young began to experience intermittent health problems which would plague her for the rest of her life. As a result, her singing appearances became much less frequent and she only appeared in a handful of stage roles over the next decade, the last being as Britannia in Arne's Eliza in 1754. Her concert schedule was also much diminished with her only notable appearances being a 1748 winter concert season in Dublin with the Lampes, where she sang the role of Galatea in Handel's Acis and Galatea, and a few intermittent concerts in London between 1747–1754. To compound her problems, Young's marriage was becoming increasingly unhappy. In 1755 the couple returned to Dublin for performances at the Smock Alley Theatre and while there the marriage broke down with Thomas leaving Cecilia in Ireland with her young niece Polly. Thomas filed for legal separation alleging that she was mentally ill. He agreed to support her with £40 a year, though in 1758 her friend Mrs Delany wrote that she was "much humbled", teaching singing in Downpatrick: "She has been severely used by a bad husband, and suffered to starve, if she had not met with charitable people". However, other records indicate that she received a reasonable amount of money from the sales of published collections of his music.

Young returned to London with Polly in 1762. She made only one more known public performance, appearing at a benefit concert for Polly and her husband, composer François-Hippolyte Barthélémon, in 1774. She reconciled with her husband shortly before his death in 1778, after which she lived with Polly and François until her death in London in 1789.
