= William Smethergell =

English composer and musician

William Smethergell (6 January 1751 - before March 1836) was an English composer and musician who lived and worked in London. Christened in the church of St Peter le Poer, after an apprenticeship of seven years (with the organist and composer Thomas Curtis), Smethergell became the organist of two London churches, All Hallows-by-the-Tower and St Mary-at-Hill, posts which he held simultaneously for fifty years. He was also the principal viola player at the Vauxhall Pleasure Gardens.

His surviving works include two published sets of overture-symphonies (Op. 2 and Op. 5), six harpsichord sonatas, seven keyboard concertos and a number of works for smaller forces. Timothy Rishton, writing about his life in 1983, notes that the early promise of his keyboard works, some of the first to be specified for pianoforte, is not fulfilled, and for the last thirty years of his life he wrote little (at least which survives). According to Jürgen Schaarwächter, performances of Smethergell’s orchestral music were often heard in Vauxhall Gardens until the 1790s, when stylistic changes in Europe turned it unfashionable.

The 12 overtures are (with the exception of Op. 5 No 4) all in three movements, and they are scored in eight parts, giving a fuller orchestral sound than the seven keyboard concertos. The first set were published in 1778 and the second set two years later - these proved popular enough with musicians (beyond the Vauxhall band) that a second edition was produced. Both sets have been recorded by Douglas Bostock with the Südwestdeutsches Kammerorchester Pforzheim.
