= Elizabeth Young (contralto) =

English opera singer and actress

Elizabeth Young (173? in London – 12 April 1773 in London) was an English contralto and actress. She was part of a well-known English family of musicians that included several professional singers and organists during the seventeenth and eighteenth centuries.

== Biography ==
Elizabeth Young was born in the 1730s. Her father, Charles Young, was a clerk at the Treasury. She was the middle child of three daughters and her older sister Isabella was a successful mezzo-soprano and her younger sister Polly was a celebrated soprano, composer and keyboard player. Both her grandfather, Charles Young, and her great-uncle, Anthony Young, were notable organists and composers. She also had three famous aunts who were all notable singers. Her Aunt Cecilia (1712–1789), was one of the greatest English sopranos of the eighteenth century and the wife of composer Thomas Arne. Her Aunt Isabella was also a successful soprano and the wife of composer John Frederick Lampe and her Aunt Esther was a well known contralto and wife to Charles Jones, a successful music publisher in England during the eighteenth century.

In 1755 Elizabeth traveled to Dublin with Uncle Thomas and Aunt Cecilia Arne to sing the role of Grideline in Thomas's opera Rosamond at the Smock Alley Theatre. The trip proved to be somewhat ill-fated as Thomas and Cecilia's marital difficulties came to a head on this trip, with the end result being that Thomas left his wife. Elizabeth did not stick to blood lines and decided to return to England with her uncle in 1756. The following December she appeared as a shepherdess in her uncle's opera Eliza.

In 1758, Elizabeth Young joined the company of players at the Theatre Royal, Drury Lane where she first appeared as Lucy in The Beggar's Opera. The performance was deceptively billed as "her first appearance on any stage", probably for marketing reasons. She sang regularly at Drury Lane until 1772 and in some seasons at Finch’s Grotto, a pleasure garden in South London. Her lower voice meant she was often given breeches roles or older women’s parts. Most notably, she created the role of Agenor in the world premiere of George Rush’s The Royal Shepherd (1764) and portrayed Ursula in the world premiere of Charles Dibdin’s The Padlock (1768). She married the violinist Ridley Dorman in 1762.
