= Isabella Young =

English mezzo-soprano and organist

Isabella Young (also Isabella Scott) (17?, London – 12 August 1791, London) was an English mezzo-soprano and organist who had a successful career as a concert performer and opera singer during the latter half of the eighteenth century. Young became particularly associated with the works of George Frideric Handel and was a favorite singer of the composer during the last years of his life. She was also a part of a well-known English family of musicians that included several professional singers and organists during the seventeenth and eighteenth centuries.

== Biography ==
Isabella Young was born in the 1720s or early 1730s but the exact year is now unknown as no record of her birth or baptism exists. Her father, Charles Young, was a clerk at the Treasury. She was the eldest child of three daughters and her younger sister Elizabeth was a successful contralto and her youngest sister Polly was a celebrated soprano, composer and keyboard player. Both her grandfather, Charles Young, and her great-uncle, Anthony Young were notable organists and composers. She also had three famous aunts who were all notable singers. Her Aunt Cecilia (1712–1789), was one of the greatest English sopranos of the eighteenth century and the wife of composer Thomas Arne. Her Aunt Isabella was also a successful soprano and the wife of composer John Frederick Lampe and her Aunt Esther was a well-known contralto and wife to Charles Jones, a successful music publisher in England during the eighteenth century.

Young studied singing with the bass Gustavus Waltz and she made her professional debut appearing with him in concert on 18 March 1751. She went on to have a highly successful career as a concert and oratorio singer in London and the provincial festivals. She became a favorite of Handel's during the composer's last few years, appearing in several performances of his works including the role of Counsel (Truth) in the world premiere of The Triumph of Time and Truth in March 1757. She was also a soloist in the Messiah performances at the Foundling Hospital on a number of occasions. Young was also an accomplished organist and would often play organ in recitals and concerts in addition to singing. She became particularly known for her organ recitals of Handel's compositions.

Although more famous as a concert soloist, Young also performed on the stage with success. In 1754 she sang in three operas by her uncle, Thomas Arne; Alfred and Rosamond at the Covent Garden Theatre, and Eliza at the Little Theatre in the Haymarket. In February 1755 she appeared at the Theatre Royal, Drury Lane as Titania in J.C. Smith’s opera The Fairies. She returned to that theatre regularly through 1777, singing between the acts, in musical interludes and afterpieces. She also created roles in George Rush’s English operas The Royal Shepherd and The Capricious Lovers.

After her marriage to the Hon. John Scott in December 1757 Isabella usually sang in concerts and oratorios as Mrs Scott, but on stage she continued to describe herself as Miss Young until 1769.
