= Anthony Young (musician) =

English organist and composer

Anthony Young (January 1683 – 8 May 1747) was an English organist and composer. He was part of a well-known English family of musicians that included several professional singers and organists during the 17th and 18th centuries.

== Biography ==
Anthony Young was born sometime during January 1683 in the Covent Garden area of London and was baptised on the following 11 February. Born into a musical family, his initial studies were with his father alongside his younger brother Charles Young, who would also become a successful organist and minor composer. As a boy he sang as a chorister at the Chapel Royal until March 1700. Music historian Charles Burney wrote that Anthony was organist at St Katherine Cree from 1702 to 1706, but modern scholarship makes this seem unlikely. He did, however, hold the post at St. Clement Danes from 1707 until his death in London in 1747. Anthony was by all accounts a fantastic organist and highly regarded among his peers. Along with Edward Purcell (eldest son of Henry Purcell), Thomas Arne, William Boyce, Johann Christoph Pepusch, and George Frideric Handel, he was a founder member of the Royal Society of Musicians in 1739.

Several of Young's nieces also had successful music careers. His niece Cecilia Young (1712–1789) was one of the greatest English sopranos of the 18th century and the wife of composer Thomas Arne. His other niece Isabella was also a successful soprano and the wife of composer John Frederick Lampe, and his niece Esther was a well known contralto and wife to Charles Jones, one of the largest music publishers in England during the 18th century. Young's nephew, Charles, was a clerk at the Treasury, whose daughters, Isabella, Elizabeth, and Polly followed in the foot steps of their aunts to become successful singers.

== Works ==
Although Young was not a prolific composer, what little he did write was commercially successful. Seven of his songs appeared in The Monthly Mask of Vocal Music between 1705 and 1709, he published A New Collection of Songs (1707), and in 1719 Walsh and Hare published his Suits of Lessons for the Harpsichord or Spinnet. All of these sold well, particularly the latter publication. Young also wrote some organ music and anthems which were never published.
