= Esther Young =

English operatic contralto (1717–1795)

Esther Young (also Esther Jones or Hester Jones) (14 February 1717 in London – 6 June 1795 in London) was an English operatic contralto and the wife of music publisher Charles Jones. She was part of a well-known English family of musicians that included several professional singers and organists during the 17th and 18th centuries.

== Biography ==
Esther Young was born on 14 February 1717 in the Covent Garden area of London. Both her father, Charles Young, and his brother, Anthony Young, were well known organists and minor composers. The youngest child of four, Esther's oldest sister Cecilia was one of the greatest English sopranos of the 18th century and the wife of composer Thomas Arne. Her other older sister Isabella was also a successful soprano and the wife of composer John Frederick Lampe. Although her older brother Charles was a clerk at the Royal Treasury and not a professional musician, his daughters Isabella, Elizabeth, and Polly followed in the foot steps of their aunts to become successful singers.

Along with her sisters, Esther's earliest musical training was with her father but she eventually studied privately with other teachers. She made her professional singing debut in a series of concerts in 1736. The following year she made her first opera appearance in the role of Mauxalinda in the original production of Lampe’s The Dragon of Wantley at the Haymarket Theatre. Her sister Isabella sang the heroine Margery in the production and both girls stayed with the show when it moved to the Covent Garden Theatre. The opera was a tremendous success and ran for several seasons. Isabella married Lampe midway through the show's run.

Esther continued to appear in productions for the next four decades, mostly at Covent Garden. She appeared in several Lampe operas and played Lucy in John Gay's The Beggar’s Opera for many years. In 1744 she sang Juno and Ino in the world première of Handel’s Semele and in 1750 sang the role of Hercules in the world premiere of Handel's The Choice of Hercules. Some references have indicated that she went with her sister Cecilia Young and her husband Thomas Arne to Ireland in 1755, but performance records prove this to be inaccurate as she sang at Covent Garden throughout the 1755–6 season. Indeed, Esther sang at that theatre every year from 1743 until her retirement in 1776. However, towards the end of her career she sang mostly in the chorus and not in featured roles.

On 8 April 1762, Esther married the music seller and publisher Charles Jones. According to historian Charles Burney, by December 1785, a few years after her husband's death, Esther was impoverished and seriously ill. Her sister Isabella Lampe took care of her during this time with "unremitting Tenderness" until her death on 6 June 1795.
