= All Hallows-by-the-Tower =

- Parish Church of All Hallows by the Tower
- All Hallows Barking, Berkyngechirche
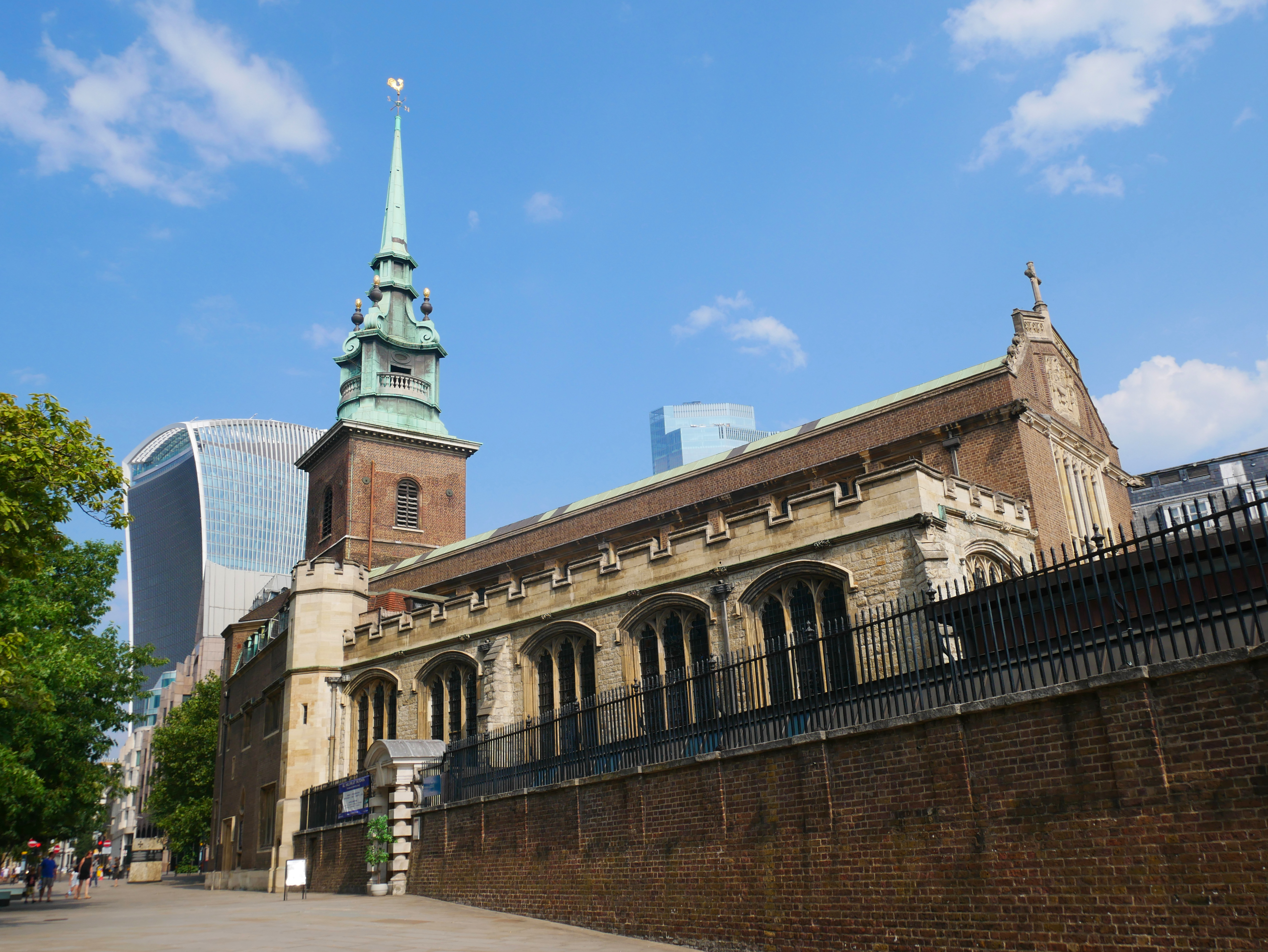
- All Hallows-by-the-Tower in 2020

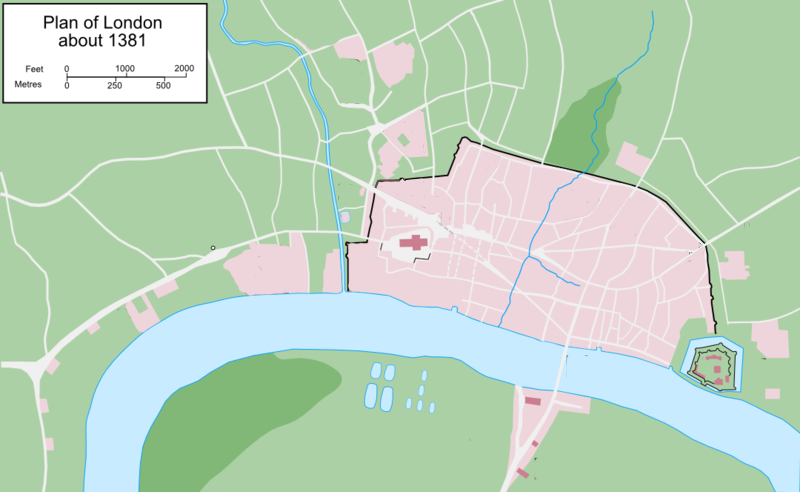
- Location within City of London Location within City of London in 1300
- 51.5094°N 0.0794°W
- OS grid reference: TQ 33385 80687
- Location: Byward Street; City of London, EC3
- Country: England
- Language: English
- Denomination: Church of England
- Previous denomination: Roman Catholic (to 1538)
- Religious order: Benedictines (until 1534)
- Churchmanship: Modern Catholic
- Website: ahbtt.org.uk

History
- Founded: 7th–11th century AD; traditionally dated to AD 675 but there is minimal evidence of this
- Dedication: All Saints and Mary, mother of Jesus

Architecture
- Heritage designation: Grade I listed building

Administration
- Diocese: Diocese of London

Clergy
- Vicar: Reverend Nicol Kinrade

All Hallows-by-the-Tower, at one time dedicated jointly to All Hallows (All Saints) and the Virgin Mary and sometimes known as All Hallows Barking, is an Early Medieval Anglican church on Byward Street in the City of London, England, overlooking the Tower of London.

According to the church website and other sources it is "the oldest church in the City of London" and was founded in AD 675, although recent research has questioned these claims. The church survived the Great Fire of London in 1666, but was badly damaged during the Blitz in World War II. Following extensive reconstruction, it was rededicated in 1957. From 1922 until 1962 the vicar was Tubby Clayton, and the church is still the guild church of Toc H, the international Christian organisation that he founded.

== History ==
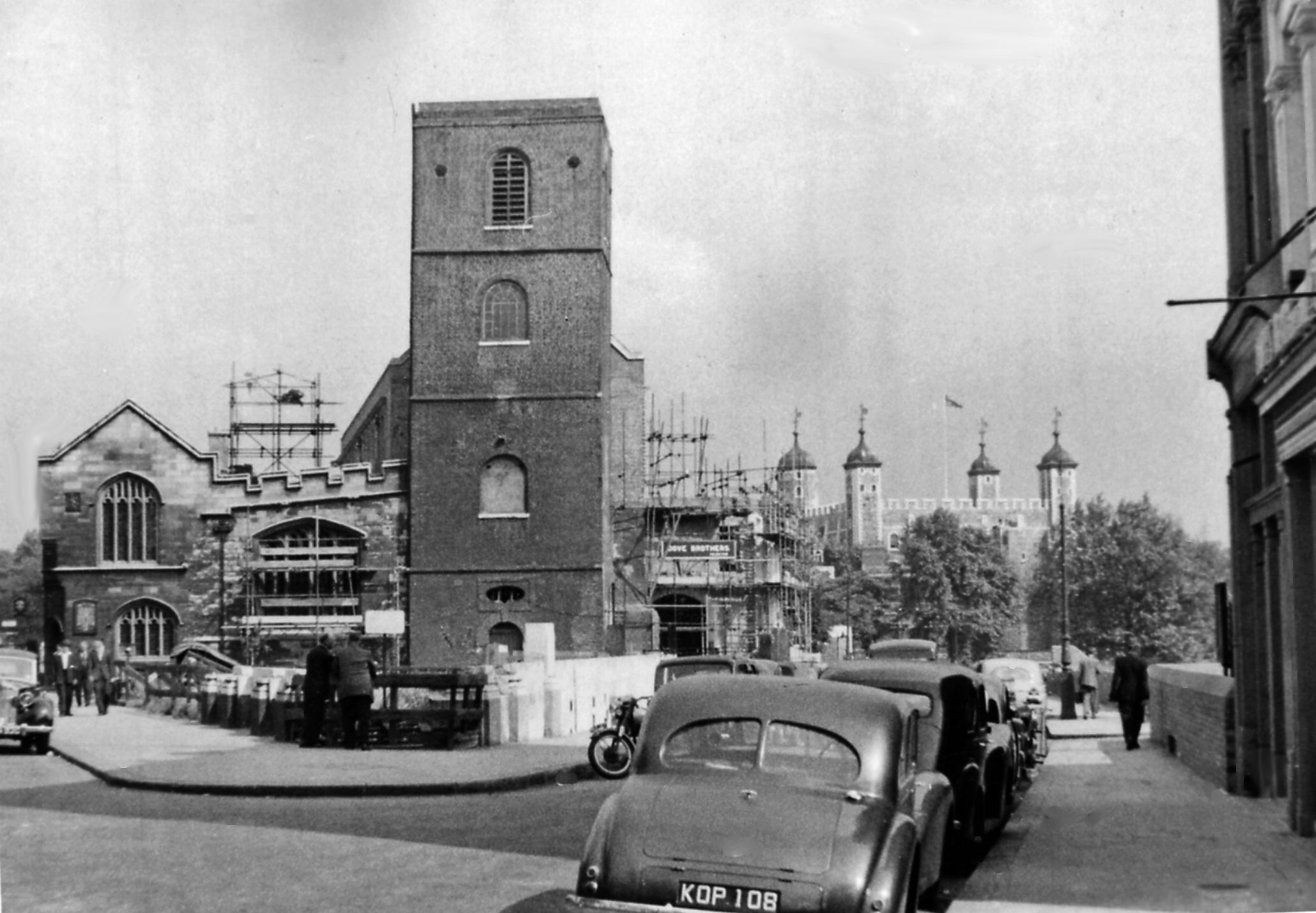
Reconstruction in 1955, following extensive damage in The Blitz

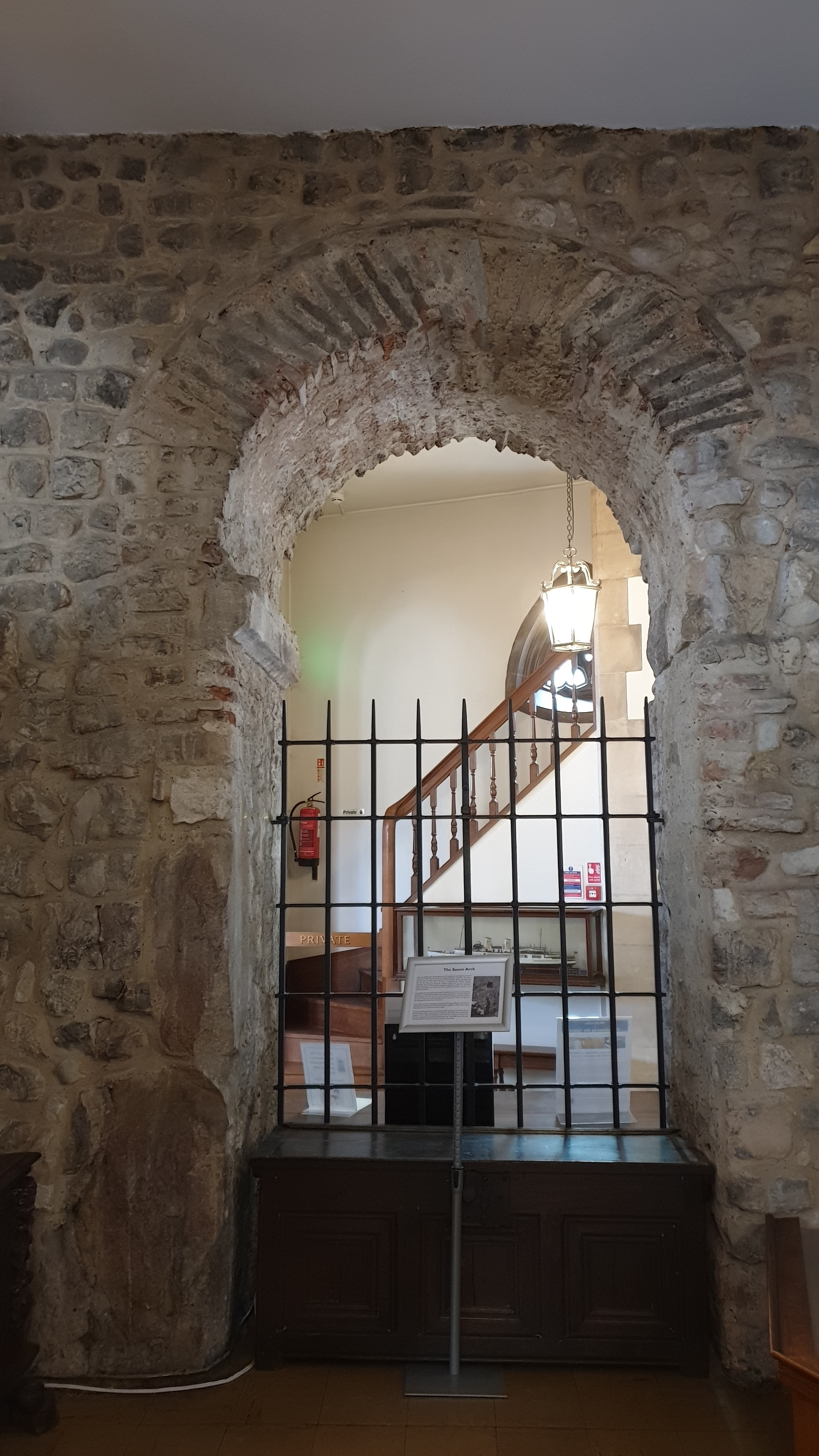
The Anglo-Saxon archway inside All Hallows

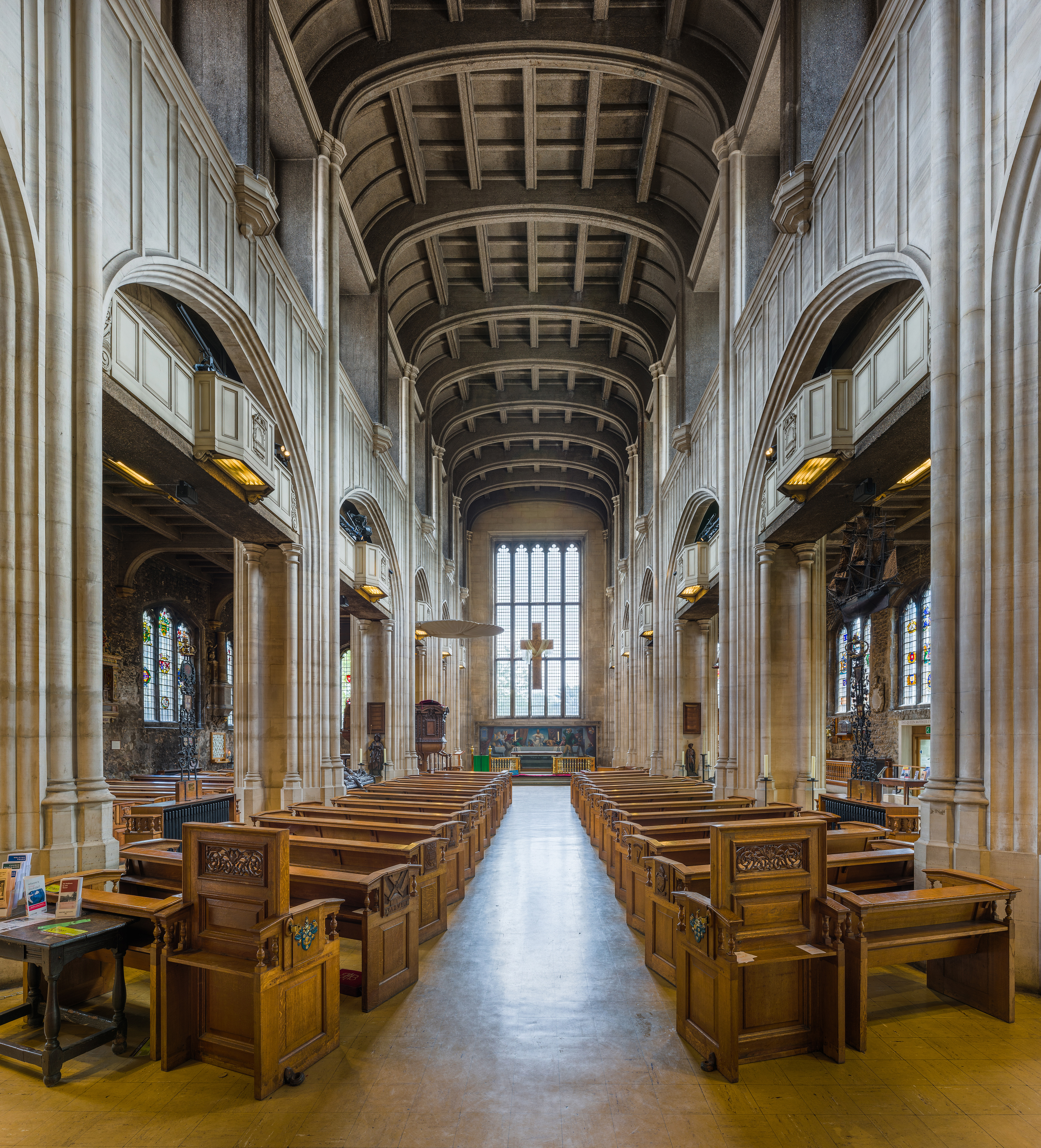
The interior

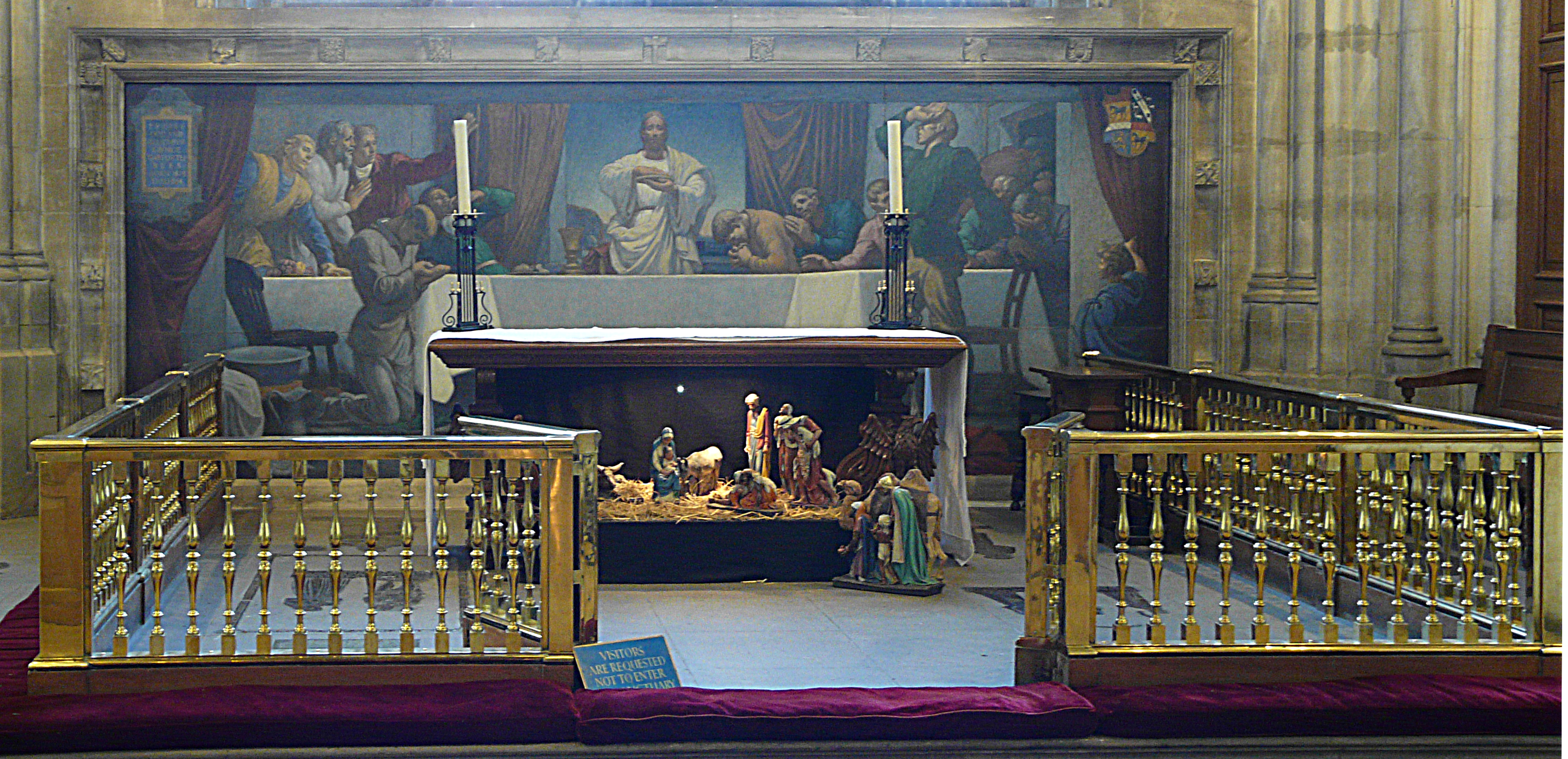
The main-altar mural, a post-war work by Brian Thomas

The origin and early history of All Hallows-by-the-Tower church are obscure. At the time of the Dissolution of the Monasteries in 1539 the church belonged to Barking Abbey, a Roman Catholic Benedictine nunnery in Barking, Essex, originally established in the 7th century. The association with Barking was a long one, and All Hallows church was already known as "Berkyncherche" in the 12th century. According to Domesday Book in 1086, Barking Abbey possessed "28 houses and half a church" in London: although the church is not named, it is usually identified with All Hallows.

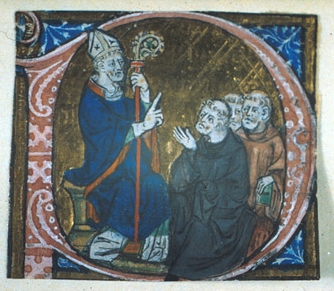
St Erkenwald, who may be associated with the earliest phases of the churchy in Saxon times, but certainly founded the Senior ecclesiastical house associated with it

The original Anglo-Saxon abbey of Barking was founded by Earconwald or Erkenwald, along with Chertsey Abbey, before he became Bishop of London in 675, and it has been claimed that the land on which All Hallows stands was granted to the abbey, under Abbess Æthelburh (Ethelburga), Erkenwald's sister, at that time. A charter dated to 687, listing properties belonging to Barking Abbey, includes two pieces of land in or near London. One of these was simply described as "iuxta Lundoniam", near/next to London, the other as "supra vicum Lundoniae", that is, in "Lundenwic", the Anglo-Saxon town that had grown up in the area of the Strand, a mile to the west of the old Roman city of Londinium; neither of these, though, accurately describes the location of All Hallows church, inside the wall of the Roman city on the eastern side.

In 1940, during World War II, the clearance after destruction caused by bombing revealed an archway built of reused Roman tiles and stonework, set in a surviving wall of the medieval church. The reuse of Roman building materials, and comparison with arches in the early Anglo-Saxon church at Brixworth, Northamptonshire, suggested that the All Hallows arch was very early in date, and that an original church could have been built as early as the 7th century. This seemed to confirm the belief that the church had been founded as a daughter church of Barking Abbey at about the same time as the abbey itself was established, although it is doubtful that the first construction on the site would have been in stone. It is more likely that the stone church, of which the arch is a remnant, superseded an earlier wooden building. Recent research, and archaeological evidence that Roman tiles and stone were being used in the construction of other London churches as late as the 11th century, suggest that the arch could have been constructed at any time between the 7th century and the arrival of the Normans. Fragments of three 11th-century stone crosses also found during archeological work in the 1930s and clearance works after the bombing, now displayed in the crypt, also date from this first church.

The church was expanded and rebuilt several times between the 11th and 15th centuries, with various elements of the Norman, 13th-century and 15th-century constructions still visible today. Its proximity to the Tower of London meant that it acquired royal connections, with Edward IV making one of its chapels a royal chantry and the beheaded victims of Tower executions being sent for temporary burial at All Hallows, Sir Thomas More being one of the most eminent of these.

The church was badly damaged by an explosion in 1650 caused when some barrels of gunpowder being stored in a warehouse adjacent to the church exploded; its west tower and some 50 nearby houses were destroyed, and there were many fatalities. The tower was rebuilt in 1658. It only narrowly survived the Great Fire of London in 1666 and owes its survival to Admiral William Penn, father of William Penn of Pennsylvania fame, who had his men from a nearby naval yard blow up the surrounding buildings to create firebreaks. During the Great Fire, Samuel Pepys climbed the church's tower to watch the progress of the blaze and what he described as "the saddest sight of desolation".

Restored once more in the late 19th century, All Hallows was gutted by German bombers during the Blitz in World War II and required extensive reconstruction, and was rededicated in 1957. The church now included carving by the Tasmanian born wood carver Ellen Nora Payne.

Many portions of the old church survived the War and have been sympathetically restored. Its outer walls are 15th-century, with the Anglo-Saxon arch doorway surviving from the original church. Many brasses remain in the interior. (The brass rubbing centre which used to be located at All Hallows is now closed). Three outstanding wooden statues of saints dating from the 15th and 16th centuries can also be found in the church, as too an exquisite Baptismal font cover which was carved in 1682 by Grinling Gibbons for £12, and which is regarded as one of the finest pieces of carving in London. The main-altar's reredos mural is a post-war work by Brian Thomas.

In 1999 the AOC Archaeology Group excavated the cemetery and made many significant discoveries.

The church has a museum in its crypt, containing portions of a Roman pavement which together with many artefacts was discovered many feet below the church in 1926/27. The exhibits focus on the history of the church and the City of London, and include Anglo-Saxon and religious artefacts as well as the 17th-century church plate. Also on display are the church's registers dating back to the 16th century, and notable entries include the baptism of William Penn, the marriage of John Quincy Adams, and the burial of Archbishop William Laud. Laud remained buried in a vault in the chapel for over 20 years; his body was moved during the Restoration to St John's College, Oxford. The crypt also houses the church's chapels dedicated to St Francis (14th century) and St Clare (early 17th century) as well as the columbarium, created in 1933.

The altar in the crypt is of plain stone from the castle of Richard I at Athlit in The Holy Land.

All Hallows-by-the-Tower has been the guild church of Toc H since 1922. The church was designated a Grade I listed building on 4 January 1950.

The church also has a chime which was brought back to working order in the 1970s by Philip Blewett, then a priest at the church, and Desmond Buckley over many weekends.

The Knollys Rose Ceremony, held annually in June, starts at the church and processes to the Mansion House, where a single rose is presented to the Lord Mayor as a 'quit rent'. The parish's annual beating the bounds ceremony also includes a boat trip to the middle of the Thames to 'beat' the water that forms the southern boundary.

== Notable people associated with the church ==
- John Quincy Adams, sixth president of the United States: (married to Louisa Catherine Johnson in 1797)
- Lancelot Andrewes, baptised 1555
- Philip Clayton, also known as 'Tubby', former vicar and founder of Toc H
- Cecil Jackson-Cole, founder of Help the Aged, Action Aid, co-founder of Oxfam and supporter of Toc H
- John Fisher, Bishop of Rochester, beheaded at the Tower 22 June 1535: (buried)
- Judge Jeffreys, notorious "hanging judge": (married 1667)
- William Laud, Archbishop of Canterbury: beheaded at the Tower, (buried 1645)
- Thomas More, beheaded at the Tower for refusing to sign Henry VIII's Act of Supremacy (buried 1535)
- William Penn, founder of Pennsylvania: (baptised 1644)
- Albert Schweitzer, made organ recordings at All Hallows
- Cecil Thomas, a sculptor who provided several funerary figures between the Wars

== Vicars ==
- 1269 John de S Magnus
- 1292 William de Gattewicke
- 1312 Gilbert de Wygeton
- 1317 Walter Grapynell
- 1333 Maurice de Jenninge
- 1351 John Foucher
- 1352 Nicholas Janing
- 1365 Thomas de Broke
- 1376 Thomas de Dalby
- 1379 Laurence de Kagrer
- 1387 William Colles
- 1387 Robert Caton
- 1390 Nicholas Bremesgrove
- 1419 John Harlyston
- —— John Clerke
- 1427 William Northwold
- 1431 John Iford
- 1434 Thomas Virley
- 1454 John Machen
- 1454 John Wyne
- —— John Walker
- 1468 Thomas Laas
- 1475 Robert Segrym
- 1478 Richard Baldry
- 1483 William Talbot
- 1492 Edmund Chaderton
- 1493 Rad Derlove
- 1504 William Gedding
- 1512 William Pattenson
- 1525 Robert Carter
- 1530 John Naylor
- 1542 William Dawes
- 1565 Richard Tyrwhit
- 1585 Richard Wood
- 1591 Thomas Ravis
- 1598 Robert Tyghe
- 1616 Edward Abbott
- 1635 Edward Layfield (deprived)
- 1643 Thomas Clendon
- 1662 Edward Layfield (restored)
- 1680 George Hickes
- 1686 John Gascarth
- 1733 William Geekie
- 1767 George Stinton
- 1783 Samuel Johnes Knight
- 1852 John Thomas
- 1884 Arthur James Mason
- 1895 Arthur W. Robinson
- 1917 Charles Lambert
- 1922 Philip (Tubby) Clayton
- 1963 Colin Cuttell
- 1977 Peter Delaney
- 2005 Bertrand Olivier
- 2018 Katherine Hedderly
- 2025 Nicol Kinrade

== Organ ==
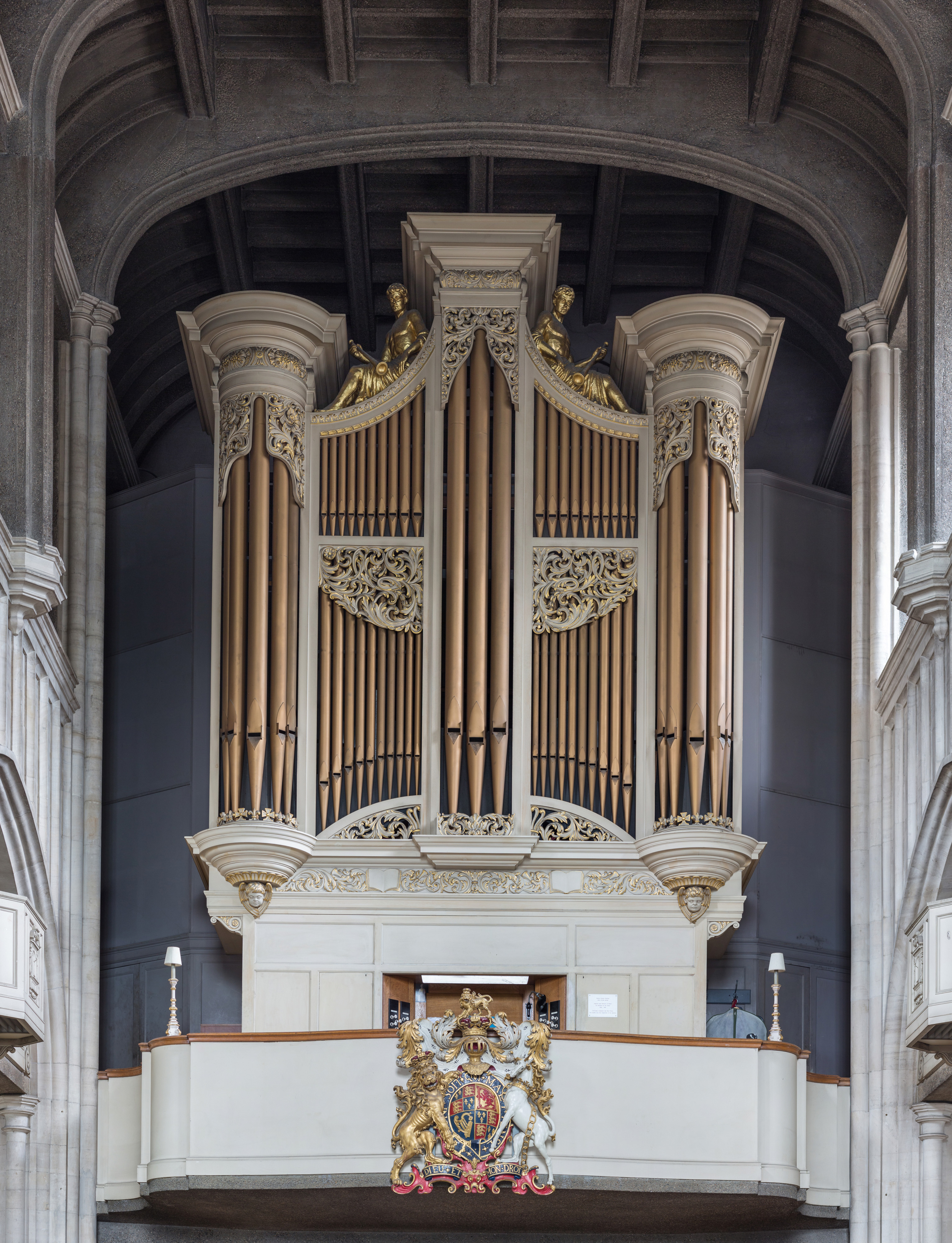
The organ

The earliest records of an organ in All Hallows is one by Anthony Duddyngton dating from 1521. This was presumably lost during the English Civil War.

An organ was installed in 1675 by Thomas and Renatus Harris. In 1720 a new case was built by Gerard Smith. The organ was restored and improved by George Pike England in 1813, Bunting in 1872 and 1878, and Gray and Davison in 1902. There was further work by Harrison and Harrison in 1909 and 1928. After destruction in 1940, a new organ by Harrison and Harrison was installed in 1957.

== Organists ==
- Albertus Bryne II (or Bryan) 1675–1713
- Charles Young 1713–1758
- Charles John Frederick Lampe 1758–1767
- Samuel Bowyer 1767–1770
- Charles Knyvett and William Smethergell 1770–1783
- William Smethergell 1783–1823
- Mary Morrice 1823–1840
- Lisetta Rist 1840–1880
- Arthur Poyser
- Gordon Phillips 1956–1991
- Jonathan Melling

=== Gallery ===
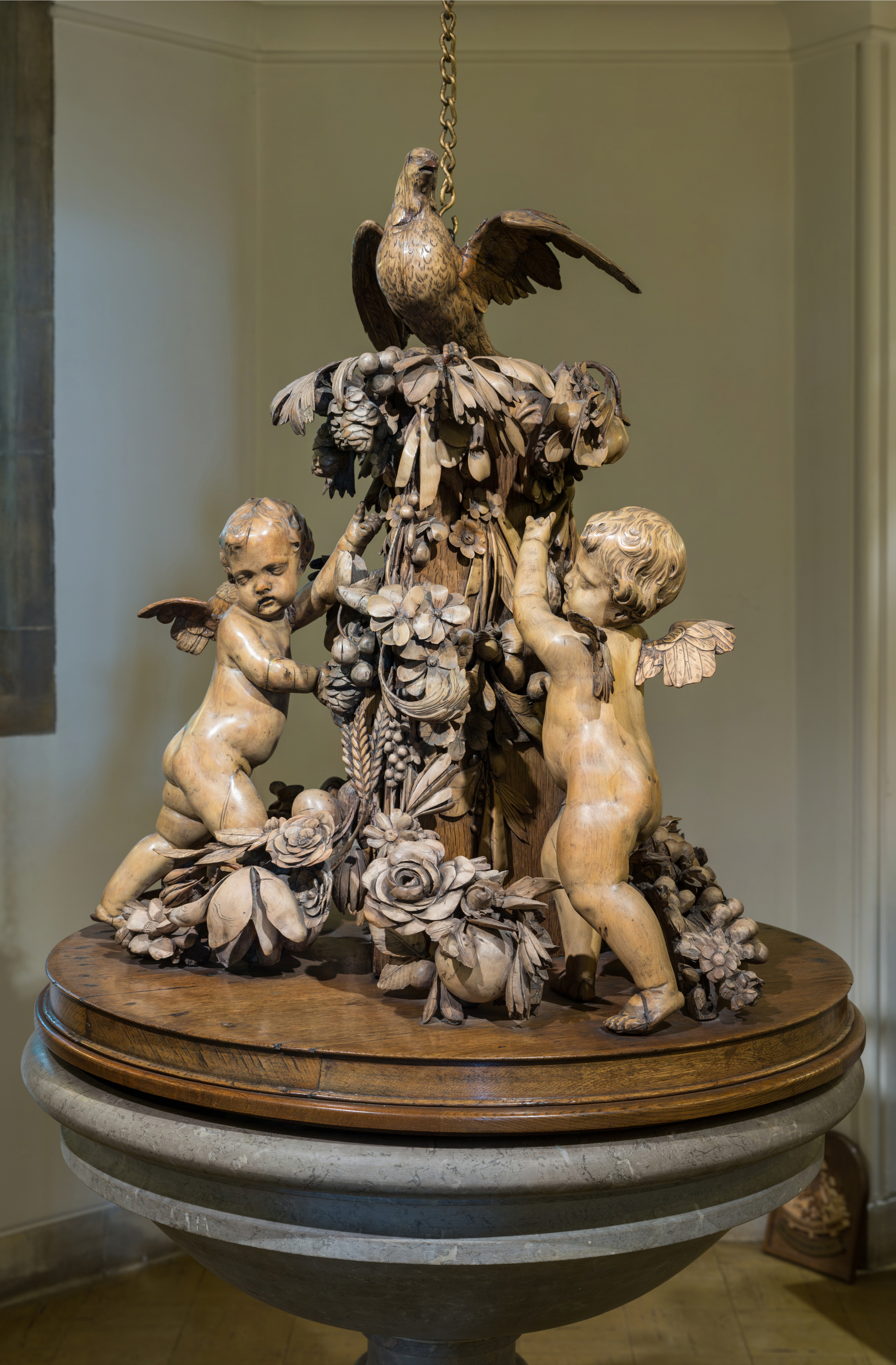
The font, with carvings by Grinling Gibbons

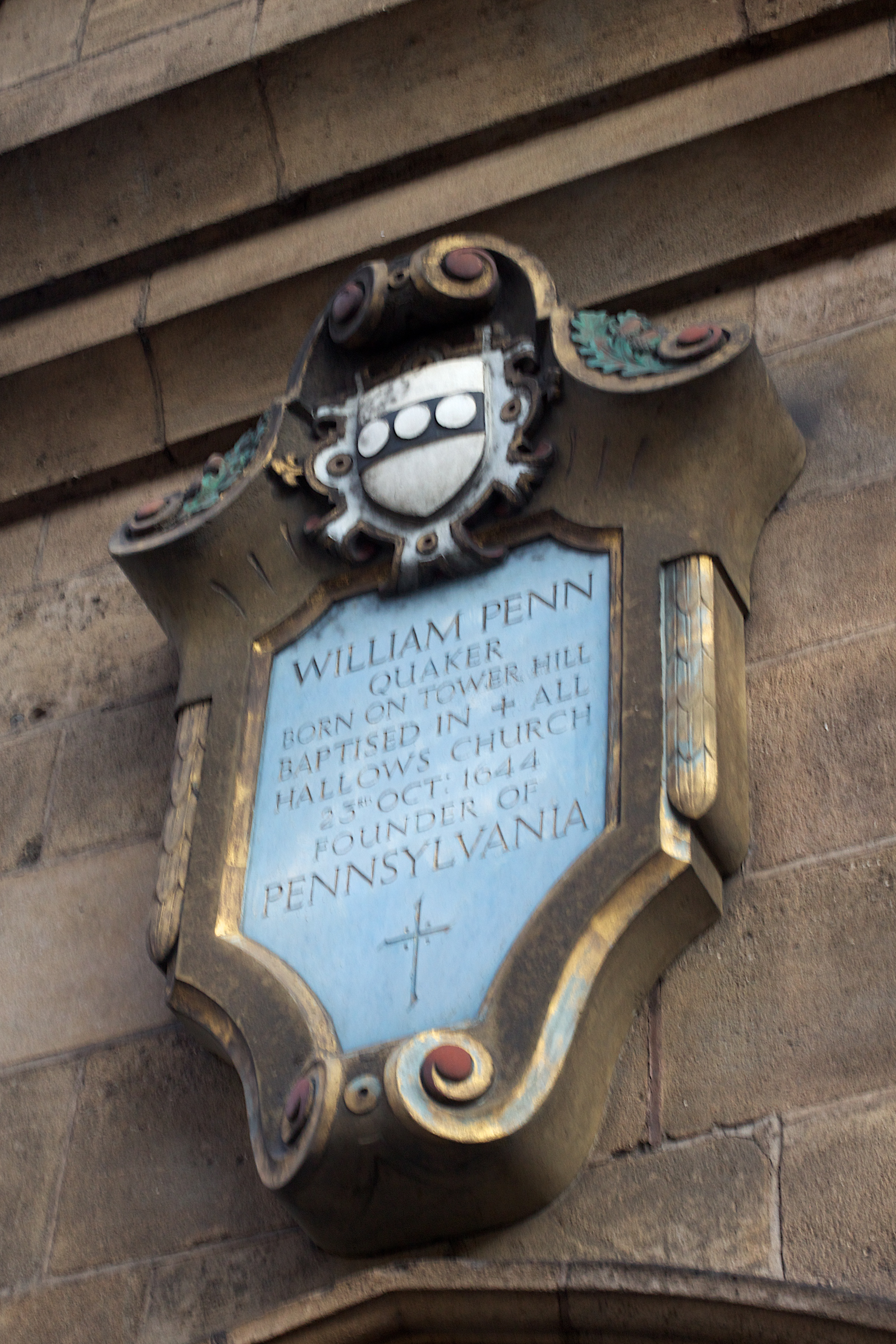
William Penn memorial

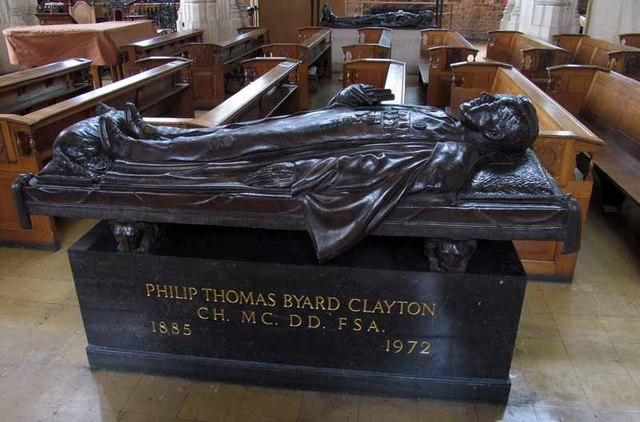
Effigy of Tubby Clayton

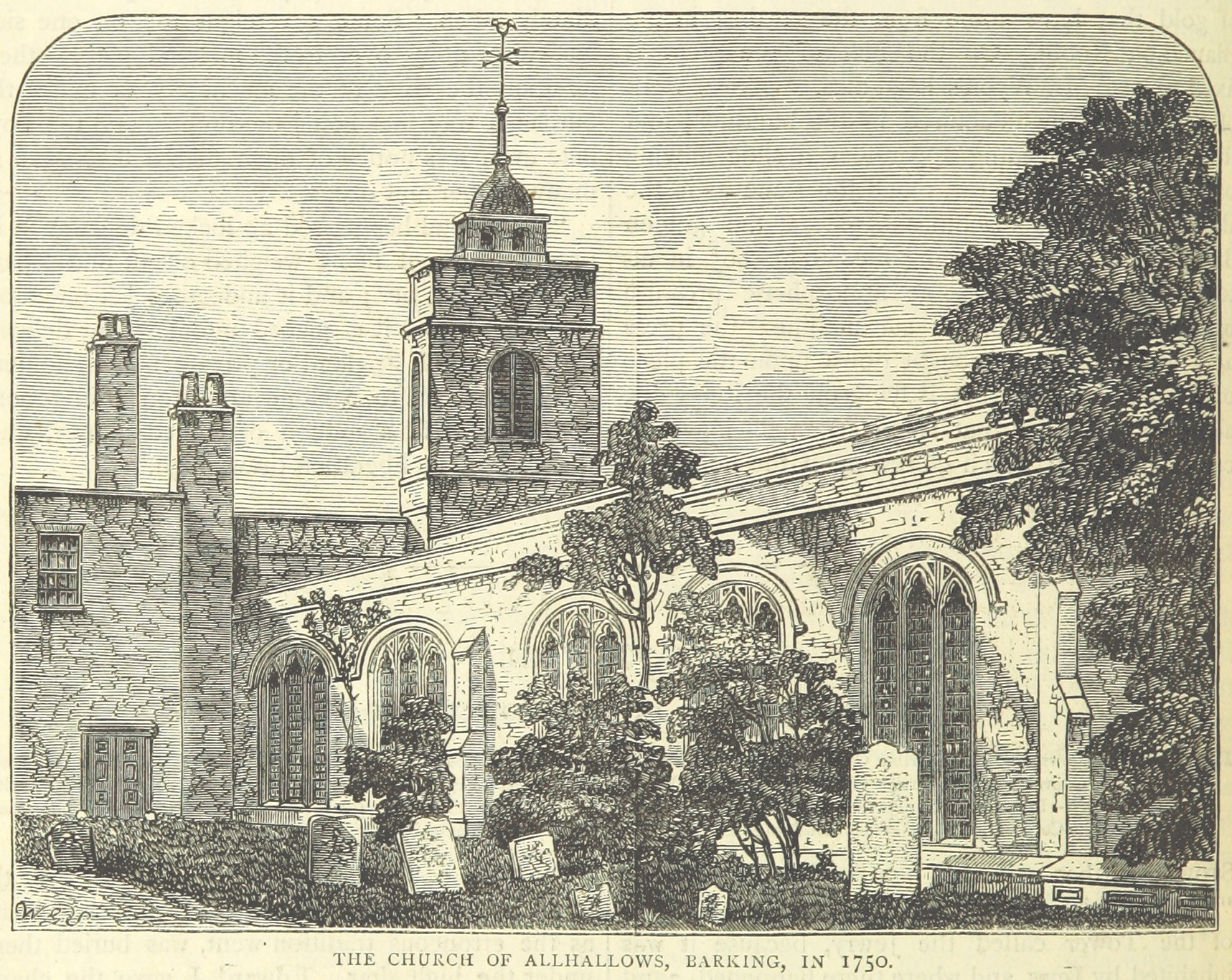
The church in 1750

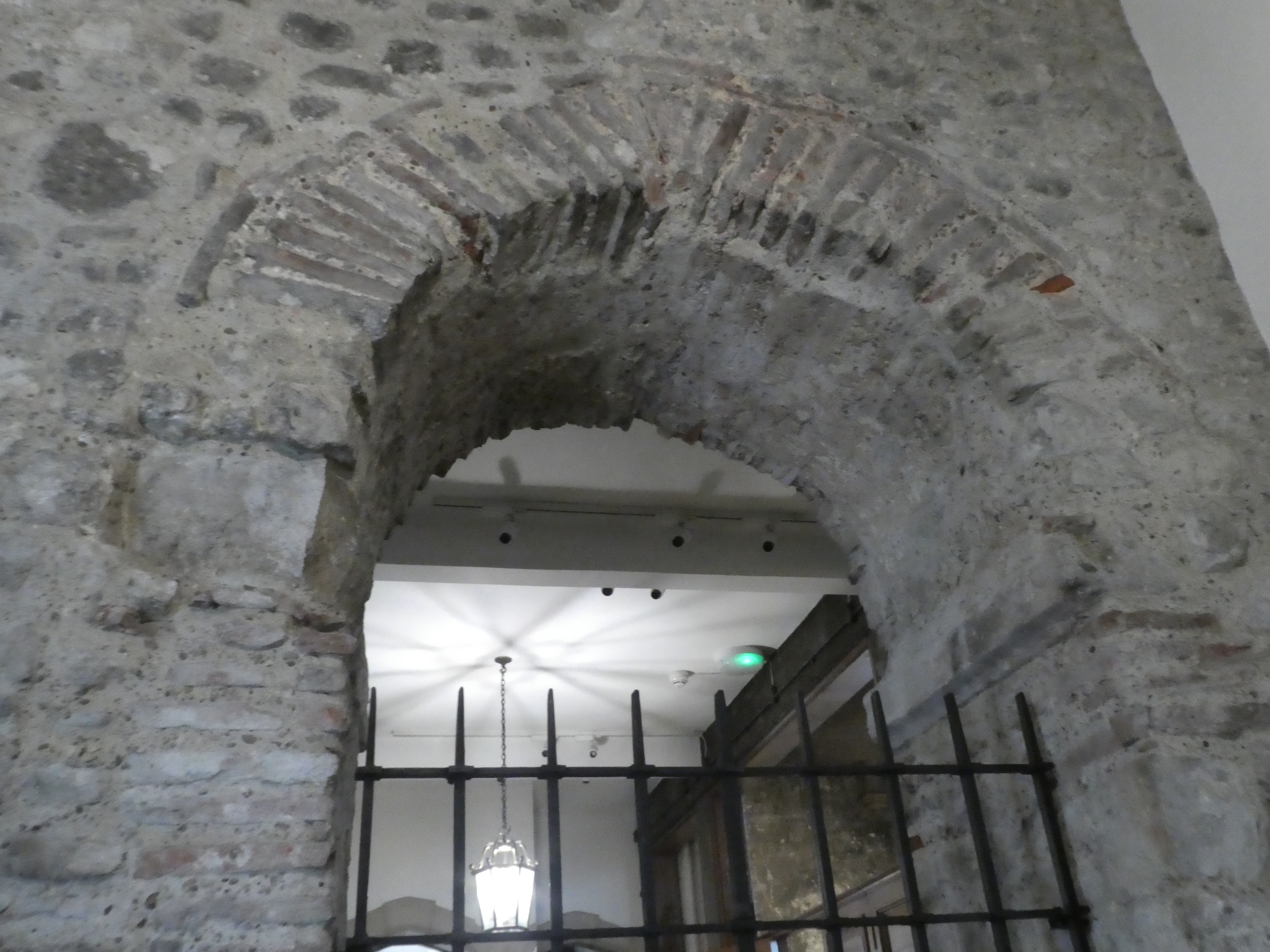
Anglo-Saxon arch

== See also ==
- List of buildings that survived the Great Fire of London
- List of Churches in London
- Malta George Cross Memorial (located just outside the church)
