= Thomas Arne =

English composer (1710–1778)

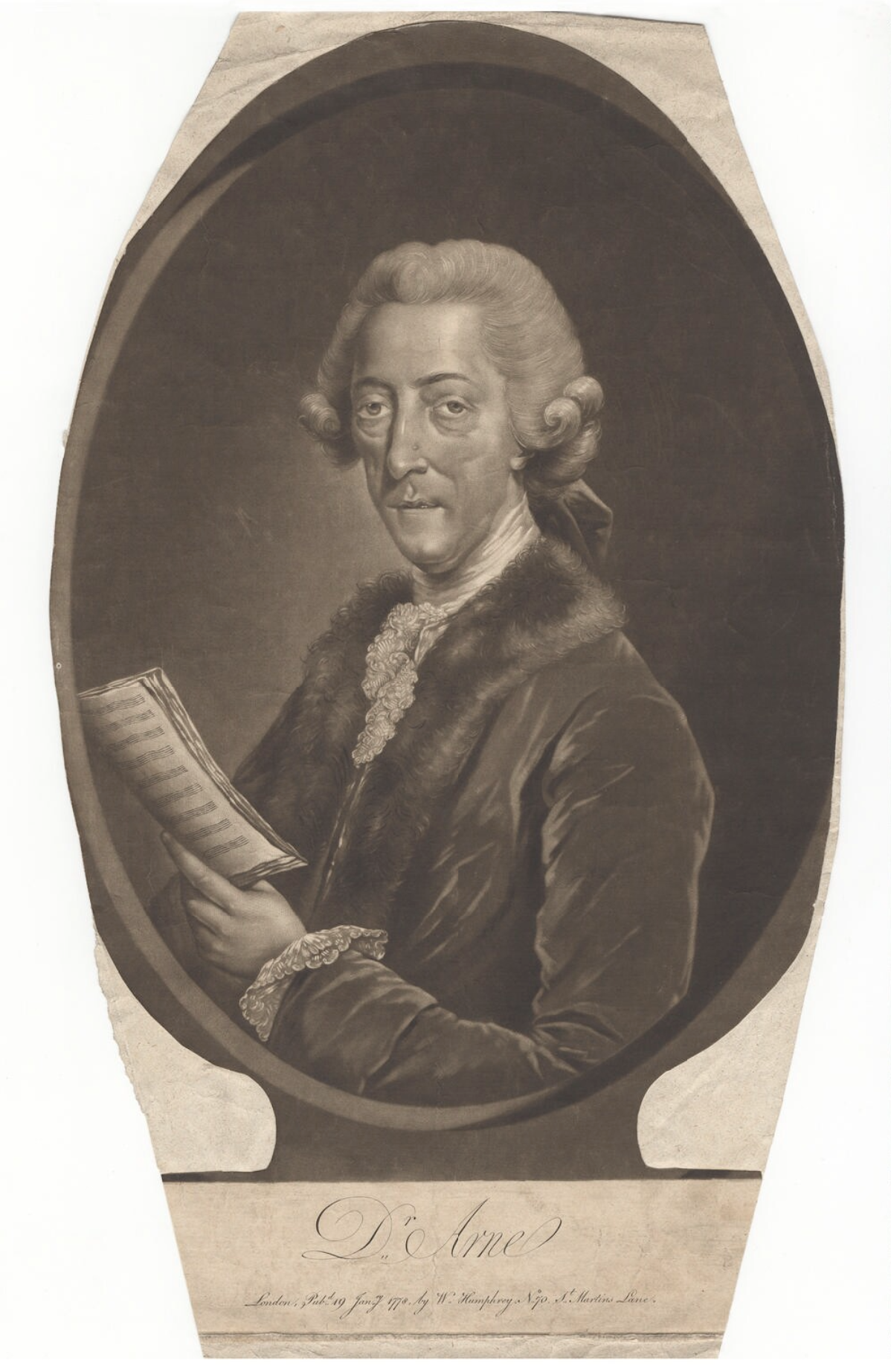
- Portrait by Robert Dunkarton, 1778
- Born: 12 March 1710; London, England
- Died: 5 March 1778 (aged 67); London, England
- Education: Eton College

Thomas Augustine Arne (/ɑːrn/; 12 March 1710 – 5 March 1778) was an English composer of the late Baroque and early Classical periods. He is known for his patriotic song "Rule, Britannia!" and the song "A-Hunting We Will Go", the latter composed for a 1777 production of The Beggar's Opera, which has since become popular as a folk song and a nursery rhyme. Arne was a leading British theatre composer of the 18th century, working at the West End's Drury Lane and Covent Garden. He wrote many operatic entertainments for the London theatres and pleasure gardens, as well as concertos, sinfonias and sonatas.

== Early life ==
Thomas Augustine Arne was born on 12 March 1710 in Covent Garden and baptised as a Roman Catholic. He came from a long line of Catholic recusants.

Arne's father and grandfather were both upholsterers and both held office in the Worshipful Company of Upholders of the City of London. His grandfather fell on hard times and died in the debtors' prison of Marshalsea. His father earned enough money to rent 31 King Street, a large house in Covent Garden, and to have Arne educated at Eton College, but in later life he too lost most of his money and had to supplement his income by acting as a numberer of the boxes (ticket-counter) at the Drury Lane Theatre.

Arne was so keen on music that he smuggled a spinet into his room and, damping the sounds with his handkerchief, would secretly practise during the night while the rest of the family slept. He also dressed up as a liveryman to gain access to the gallery of the Italian Opera. It was at the opera that Arne first met the musician and composer Michael Festing, who was a major influence on him. Festing not only taught him to play the violin, but also took him to various musical events, including going to compete against Thomas Roseingrave for the post of organist at Hanover Square, and a visit to Oxford in 1733 to hear George Frideric Handel's oratorio Athalia.

Upon leaving school, Arne was articled to a solicitor for three years. However, Arne's father discovered his son leading a group of musicians at what was probably one of Festing's musical gatherings. Following this disclosure of his son's real interest and talent, he was persuaded (again probably by Festing) to allow the young Arne to give up his legal career and to pursue music as a living.

== Musical talent career ==
Between 1733 and 1776 Arne wrote music for about 90 stage works, including plays, masques, pantomimes, and operas. Many of his dramatic scores are now lost, probably in the disastrous fire at the Royal Opera House in 1808. Arne's sister, Susannah Maria Arne, was a famous contralto who performed in some of his works, including his first opera, Rosamund. With her marriage to the Drury Lane actor Theophilus Cibber Susannah became known professionally as "Mrs Cibber". She and their brother Richard would often perform Arne's works together.

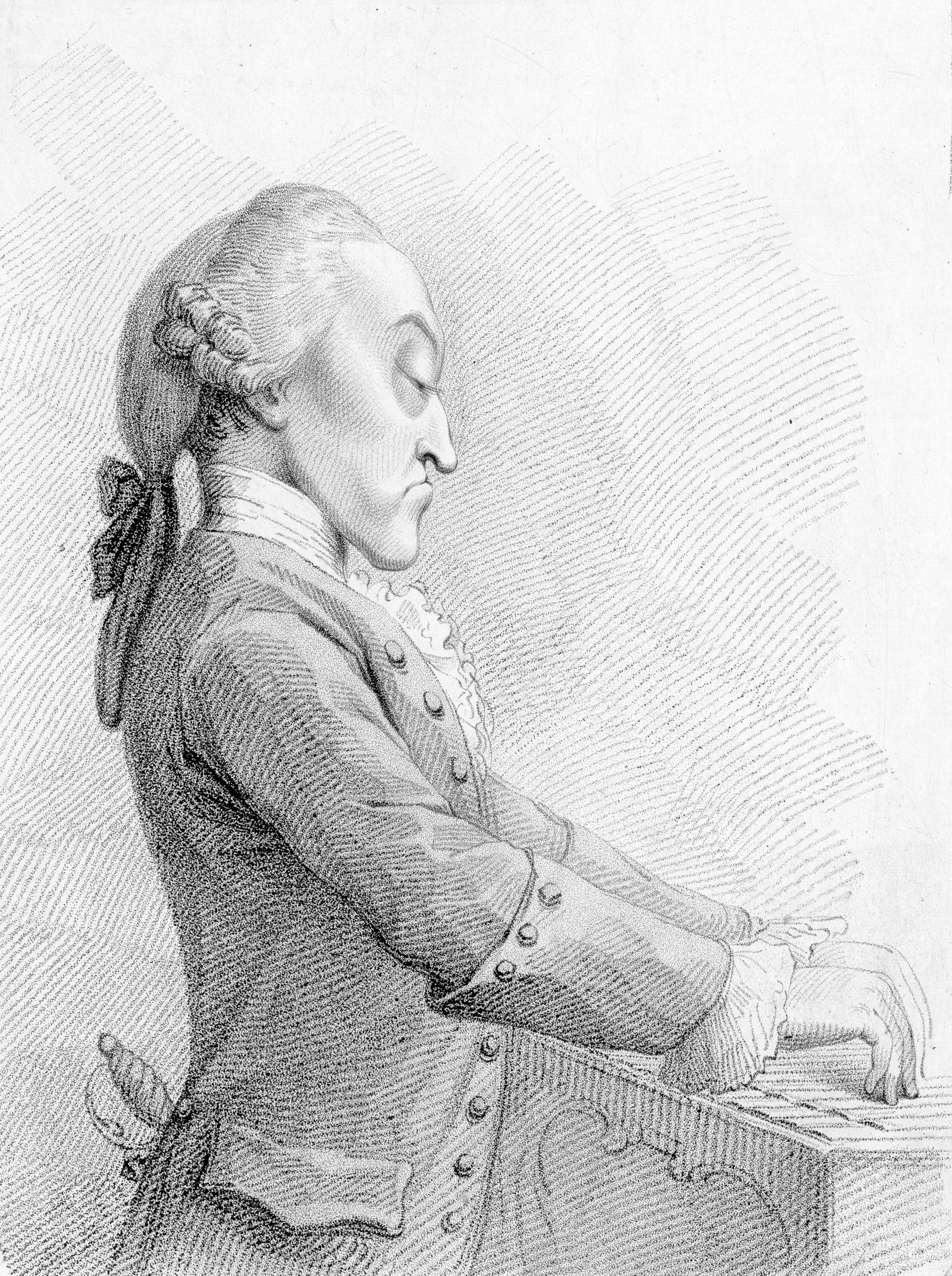
A caricature of Arne

Arne was a Freemason and active in the organisation, which has long been centred in the Covent Garden area of London, where Arne lived for many years. Like Mozart, who also lived in the 1700s, Arne lived before the Catholic hierarchy had banned membership in the Lodges in all countries.

On 15 March 1737 Arne married the singer Cecilia Young, whose sister, Isabella, was the wife of John Frederick Lampe. During this period Arne's operas and masques became increasingly popular, and he received the patronage of Frederick, Prince of Wales, at whose country house, Cliveden, the Masque of Alfred, featuring "Rule Britannia", was debuted in 1740.

In 1741 Arne filed a complaint in the Court of Chancery pertaining to a breach of musical copyright and claimed that some of his theatrical songs had been printed and sold by Henry Roberts and John Johnson, the London booksellers and music distributors. The matter was settled out of court. Arne was one of the first composers to have appealed to the law over copyright issues.

In 1742 Arne went with his wife to Dublin, where he remained two years and produced his oratorio The Death of Abel, of which only the melody known as the Hymn of Eve survives, and some stage works; he also gave a number of successful concerts. Audiences of the day were exacting, and composers had to try to maintain their attention with ever more inventive means. An advertisement in a Dublin newspaper for one of Arne's performances read that he "...intend(ed) between the Acts of his Serenatas, Operas, and other Musical Performances, to intermix Comic Interludes... intended to give Relief to that grave Attention, necessary to be kept up in Serious Performances". On his return to London in 1744 he was engaged as leader of the band at Drury Lane theatre, and the following year as composer at Vauxhall Gardens.

In 1750, after an argument with David Garrick, Susannah left Drury Lane for Covent Garden Theatre, and Arne followed. In 1755, during another period spent in Dublin, he separated from Cecilia, who, he alleged, was mentally ill. He began a relationship with one of his pupils, Charlotte Brent, a soprano and former child prodigy. Brent performed in several of Arne's works, including the role of Sally in his 1760 opera Thomas and Sally and Mandane in his 1762 opera Artaxerxes. Eventually Brent and Arne went their separate ways and she married a violinist named Thomas Pinto in 1766.

== Later life ==
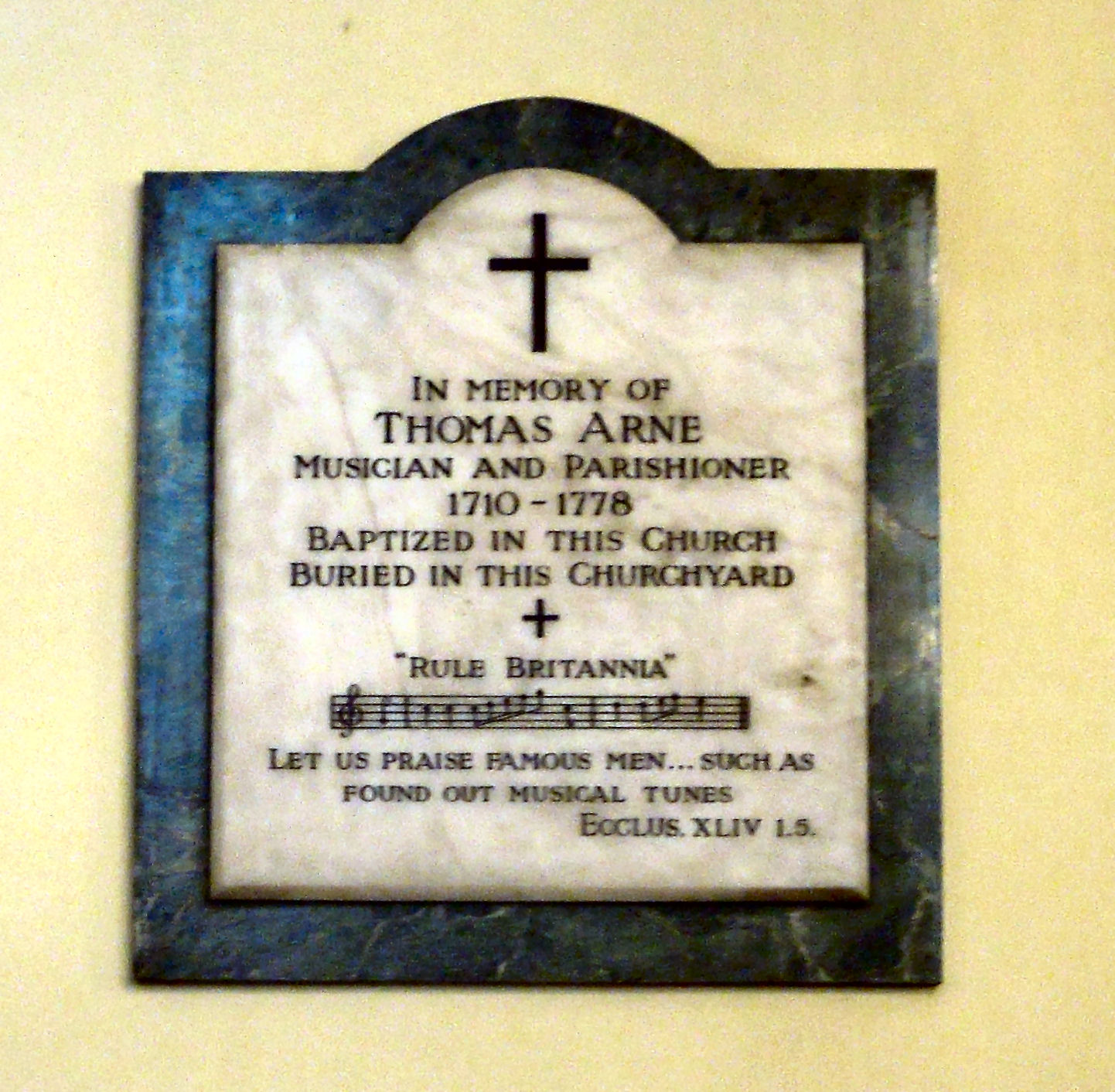
Arne's memorial plaque in St Paul's, Covent Garden

During the 1760s Arne transferred his services to Covent Garden Theatre, and frequently collaborated with the Irish writer Isaac Bickerstaffe. Thomas and Sally was the first English comic opera to be sung throughout (it contained no spoken dialogue). Artaxerxes was one of the most successful and influential English operas of the 18th century and is the only known attempt to write an Italianate, Metastasian opera seria, in the English language, using recitative instead of spoken dialogue. Wolfgang Amadeus Mozart almost certainly saw it in 1764 when he visited London and said that it influenced his operas. It was frequently performed in London into the 1830s and, other than Michael William Balfe's The Bohemian Girl, it was the most popular full-length English opera before the 20th century. On a visit to London in 1791, Joseph Haydn was impressed by a performance of Artaxerxes. he attended and admitted that he had no idea such an opera existed in the English language.

In 1769 Arne composed the song Soft Flowing Avon, with lyrics by Garrick, for the Shakespeare Jubilee held by Garrick in Stratford-upon-Avon to commemorate the life of William Shakespeare. In 1773, in a performance of Judith, Arne introduced women's voices into the choruses for the first time. In 1777, shortly before his death, Arne and his wife were reconciled. They had one son, Michael Arne, who was also a composer. Arne is buried at St Paul's, Covent Garden, London. A blue plaque, unveiled in 1988, commemorates Arne at 31 King Street in Covent Garden. Arne is considered one of 18th-century Britain's greatest theatrical composers.

== See also ==
- List of compositions by Thomas Arne

== Sources ==
- McVeigh, Simon. Concert Life in London from Mozart to Haydn. Cambridge University Press, 1993 (2006 reprint).
- Pink, Andrew. 'Thomas Arne (1710–78)' in Le Monde maçonnique des Lumières (Europe-Amériques) Dictionnaire prosopographique. Charles Porset and Cécile Révauger (eds) Paris: Editions Champion, 2013. ISBN 978-2-7453-2496-2
