= John Frederick Lampe =

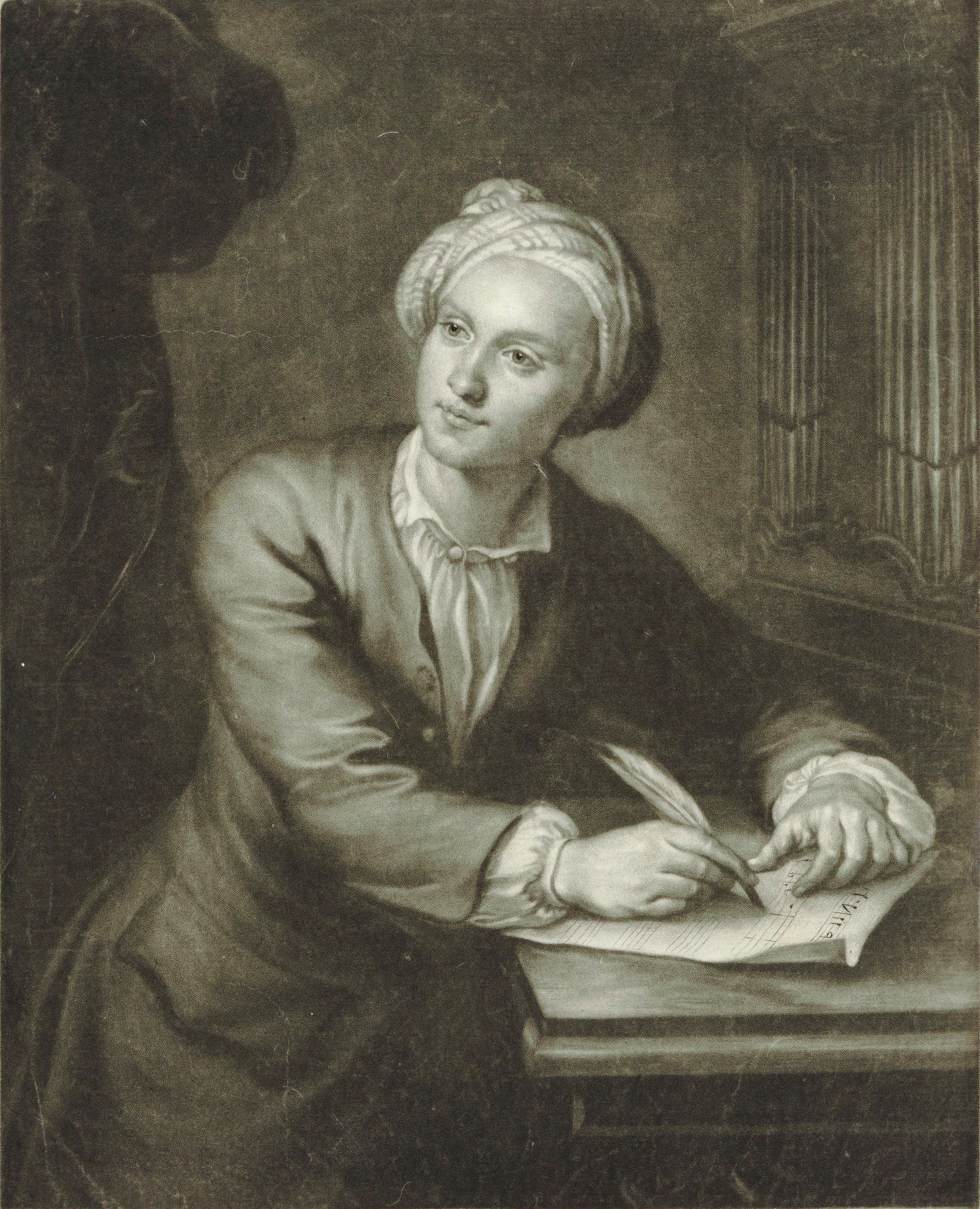
John Frederick Lampe (mezzotint by James MacArdell)

John Frederick Lampe (born Johann Friedrich Lampe; probably 1703 – 25 July 1751) was a musician and composer.

== Life ==
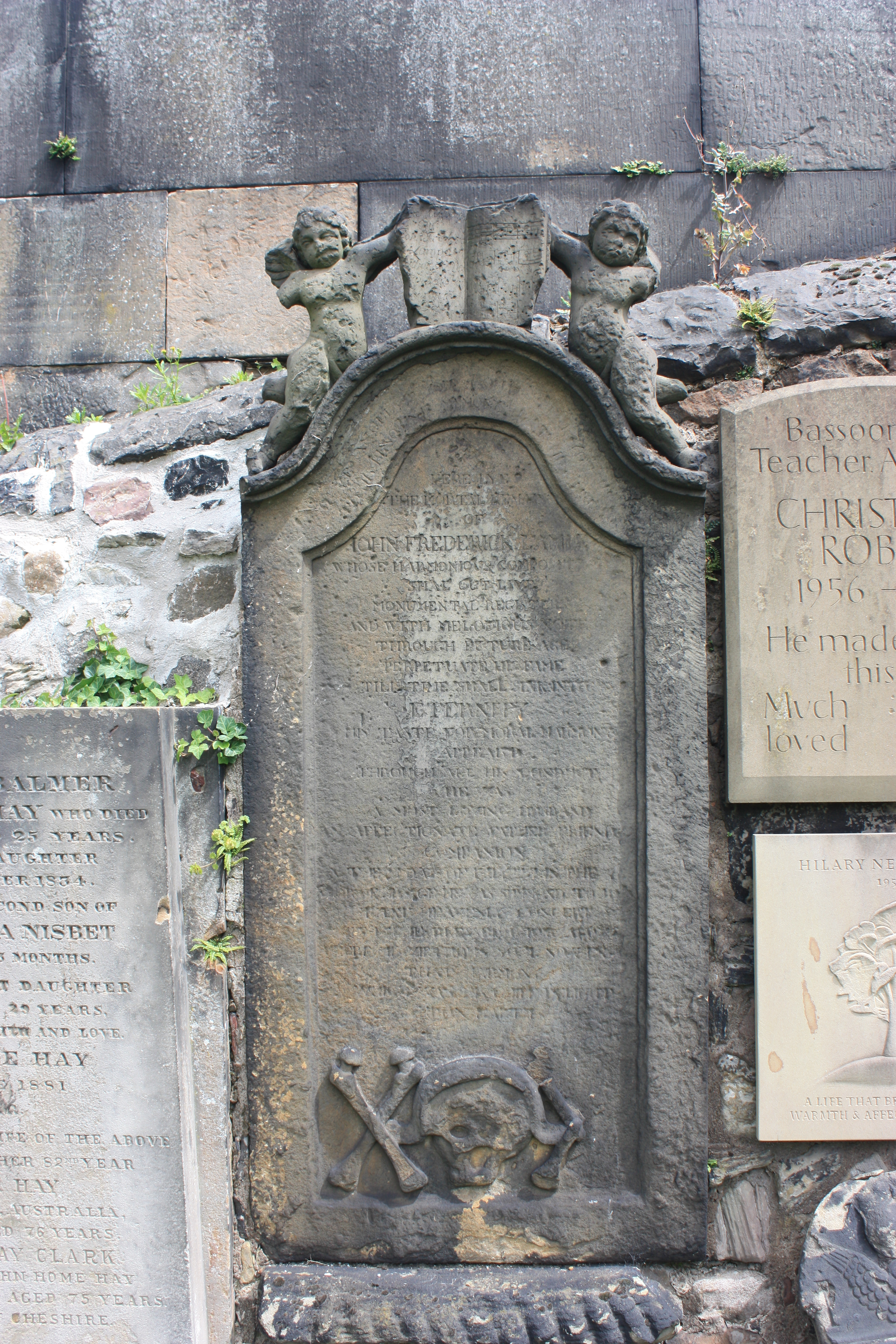
The grave of John Frederick Lampe, Canongate Kirkyard

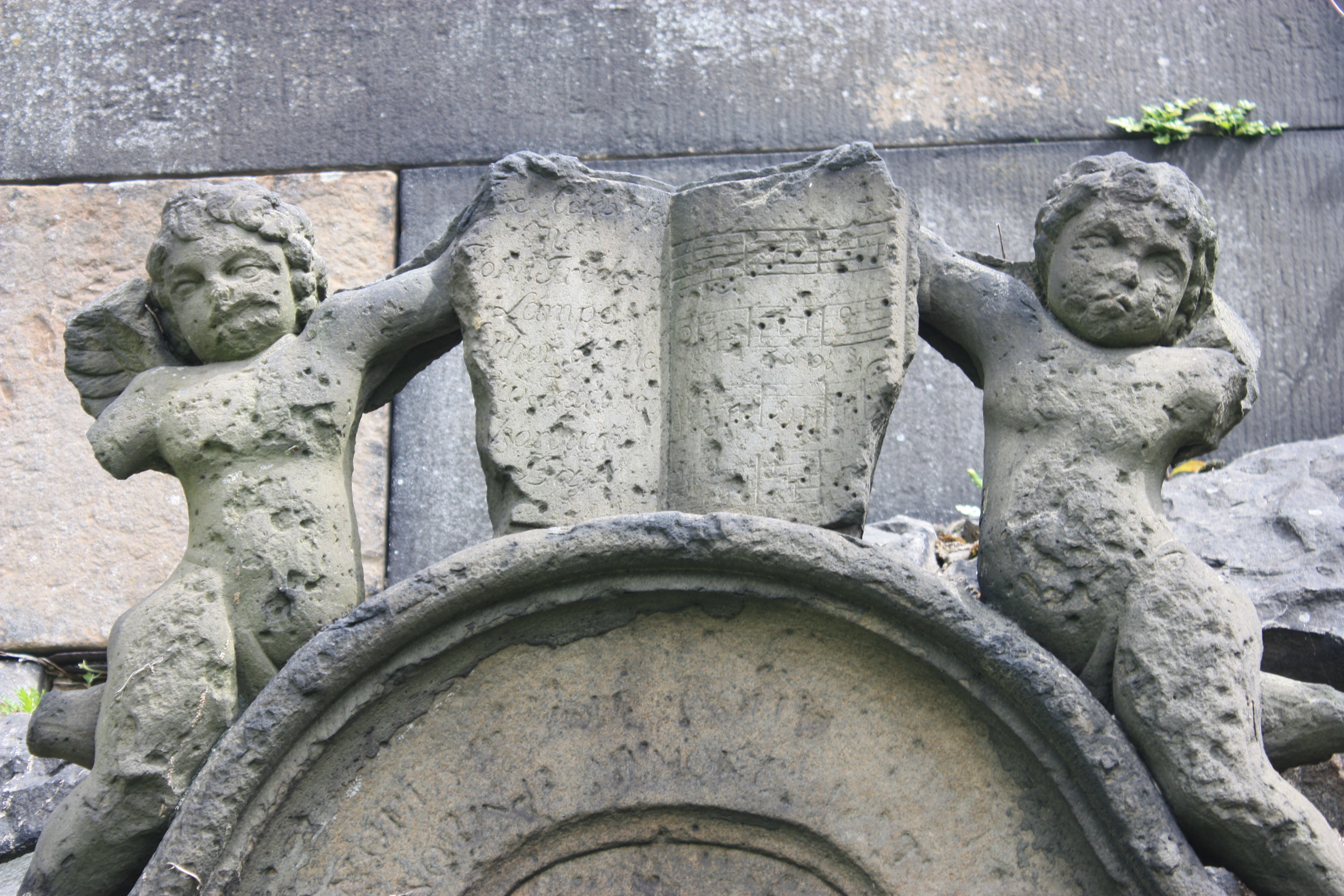
Detail from his grave

Lampe was born in the Electorate of Saxony, Holy Roman Empire. He came to England in 1724 and played the bassoon in opera houses. In 1730, he was hired by John Rich to be the composer for Covent Garden Theatre. During his time as a bassoonist in London opera houses, in 1727, he played at the coronation of King George II.

Like the composer Thomas Arne, Lampe wrote operatic works in English in defiance of the vogue for Italian opera popularized by George Frideric Handel and Nicola Porpora. Lampe, along with Henry Carey and J. S. Smith, founded the short-lived English Opera Project. He became a friend of Charles Wesley, and wrote several tunes to accompany Wesley's hymns. His works for the stage include the mock operas Pyramus and Thisbe (1745) and The Dragon of Wantley (1734), which ran for 69 nights, a record for the time, surpassing The Beggar's Opera.

From November 1750 until his death, Lampe was based in Dublin and later in Edinburgh. He is buried in Canongate Kirkyard on the Royal Mile. The grave lies to the northeast of the church behind the Fettes vault.

== Works ==
- The Cuckoo Concerto
- Cupid and Psyche or the Columbine Courtezan
- The Dragon of Wantley
- Hymns on the Great Festivals and other Occasions
- The Perfections of True Love
- Pyramus and Thisbe

== Family ==
His wife, Isabella Lampe, was sister-in-law to the composer Thomas Arne with whom Lampe collaborated on a number of concert seasons. John and Isabella's son, Charles John Frederick Lampe, was a successful organist and composer as well.
