= List of compositions by Thomas Arne =

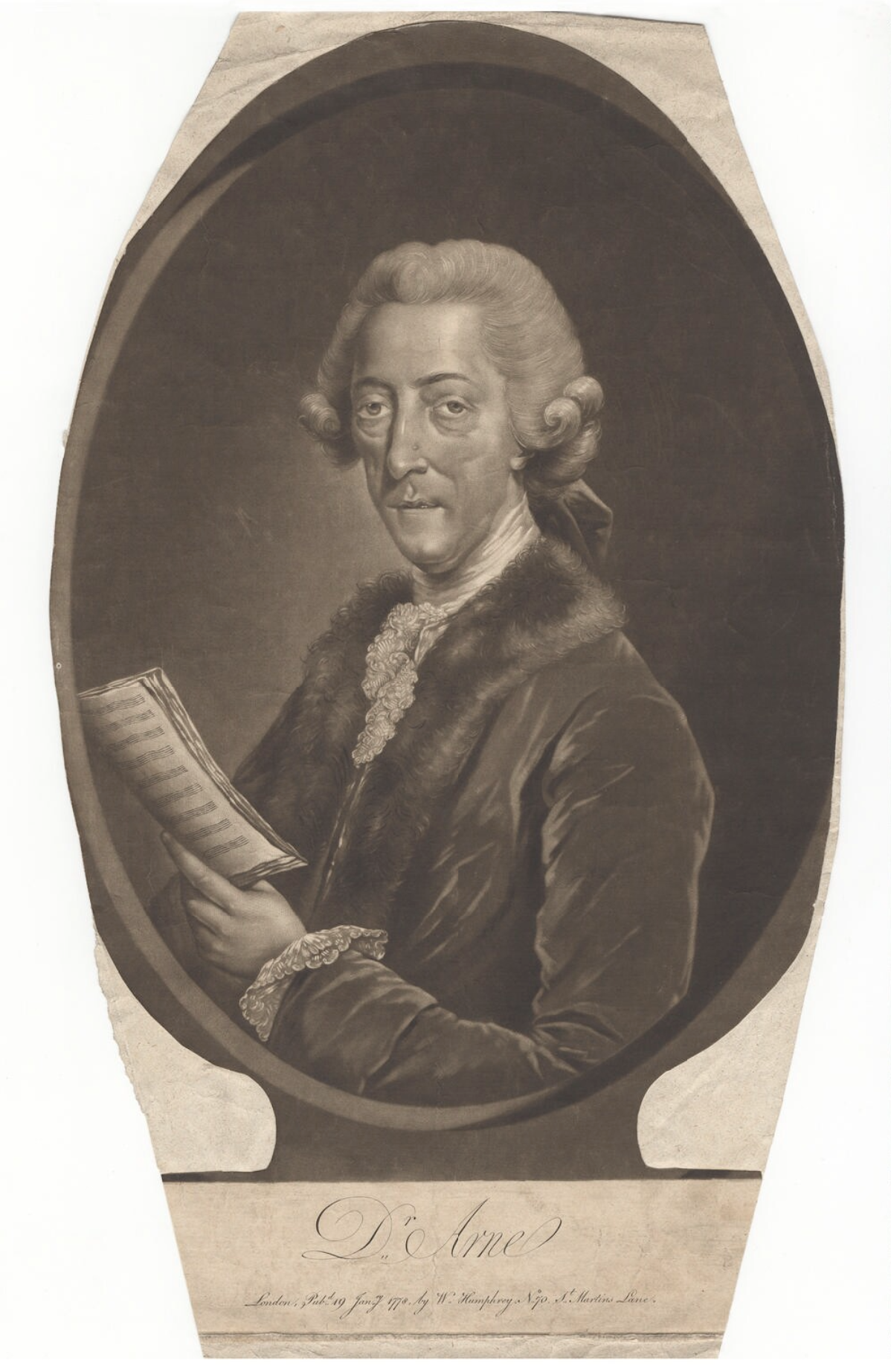
1778 portrait of Thomas Arne

This list of compositions by Thomas Arne is sorted by genre.

== Art songs ==
Arne composed numerous art songs throughout his career, most of which were written for the stage. Many of his songs were published in anthologies throughout his lifetime, but the exact number of songs he composed is now unknown. The following is a list of publications which included songs by Arne during his lifetime. The number of songs by Arne is in square brackets.

Year(s) printed	Title of publication	Other details
1737	The British Musical Miscellany, vol. vi	[1]
1741	The Songs and Duetto in The Blind Beggar of Bethnal Green	[1]
1743	The British Orpheus, vol. iii	[1]
1743–1745	Universal Harmony	[1]
1745	Lyric Harmony, vol. i	[18]
1745	The Music in The Judgment of Paris	[1]
1746	Lyric Harmony, vol. ii	[18]
1747	Peter Prelleur's An Introduction to Singing	[1]
1749	Vocal Melody, vol. i	[6]
1750	Vocal Melody, vol. ii	[8]
1751	Vocal Melody, vol. iii	[7]
1752	Vocal Melody, vol. iv	[2]
1753	Willem de Fesch's Songs Sung at Mary-bon Gardens	[2]
1753	The Agreeable Musical Choice, vol. v	[7]
1754	The Agreeable Musical Choice, vol. vi	[6]
1755	A Collection of Poems in Four Volumes by Several Hands	[1]
1756	The Agreeable Musical Choice, vol. vii	[8]
1757	A Favourite Collection of English Songs	[6]
1758	The Agreeable Musical Choice, vol. viii	[6]
1760	The Monthly Melody	[22]
1760	British Melody, vol. xi	[4]
1761	A Choice Collection of Songs, vol. xii	[3]
1761	The Winter’s Amusement, vol. xiii	[6]
1762	British Amusement	[1]
1764	The Royal Magazine, vol. xi	[1]
1764	A Favourite Collection of Songs, vol. xiv	[5]
1765	The New Songs Sung at Vauxhall	[6]
1766	Summer Amusement	[8]
1768	New Favourite Songs	[4]
1774	The Vocal Grove	[7]
1777	The Syren	[7]

== Catches, canons, glees ==
The exact number of catches, canons, and glees composed by Arne is now unknown. He began writing such works for the pleasure gardens in the 1740s but the majority of his output in this area dates from the 1760s and 1770s. Many of his glees were published in anthologies which, aside for 11 glees written for the Noblemen and Gentlemen's Catch Club, are the only surviving compositions of his in this area. This is a list of the published anthologies containing catches, canons, and glees by Arne. The number of songs by Arne is in square brackets.

Year(s) printed	Title of publication	Other details
c.1755	A Collection of Vocal Harmony	Edited by E.T. Warren. [8]
1763–1794	A Collection of Catches, Canons and Glees	Edited by E.T. Warren. Songs by Arne appear in volumes ii [4]; iii [5]; iv [2]; v [7]; vii [3]; viii [4]; xv [1]; xvi [1]; xx [1]
c.1790	Apollonian Harmony, vol. iv	[2]

== Instrumental music ==
Arne showed little interest in writing concert music. The instrumental music he did compose derives mostly from his stage works. This list contains his instrumental works that have been published separately from his stage works. Not listed below are a few solo violin and solo double bass pieces whose composition date is now unknown and whose publication did not occur until 1978.

Completion	Title	Genre	Other details
1751	Eight overtures in 8 parts	overture	This is a collection of overtures from various stage works by Arne including the overtures for Henry and Emma, Comus, and The Judgment of Paris. First used for a concert performance in 1751, the collection has been published numerous times, most recently by J. Herbage in 1937.
1756	VIII Sonatas or Lessons	sonata	Published in 1983 by C. Hogwood
1757	VII sonatas	sonata	Published by editor H. Murrill (London, 1939, 1951, 1960)
1767	Four New Overtures or Symphonies in 8 and 10 Parts	overture, symphony	Another selection of symphonic works mostly from Arne's stage works that were initially put together for a concert performance in 1767. Most recently published by editor R. Platt (London, 1973)
1793	Six Favourite Concertos	keyboard concerto	These keyboard concertos were a part of various stage works by Arne and were compiled for publication in 1793. They were most recently published by R. Langley (London, 1981)

== Odes and cantatas ==
- A Grand Epithalamium, 1736, lost
- Black-Ey’d Susan (cant., R. Leveridge), 1740, lost
- God bless our noble king, A, T, B, ATB, 2 hn, 2 ob, str, bc, 1745, GB-Lbl, ed. C. Bartlett (Wyton, 1985)
- Fair Celia love pretended (cant., W. Congreve), 1v, vns, bc, Vocal Melody, i (1749)
- Chaucer’s Recantation (cant.), 1v, str, bc, Vocal Melody, ii (1750)
- Ode to Chearfulness, 1750, lost
- Cymon and Iphigenia (cant., J. Dryden), 1v, str, bc, vs (1750), pts Bu
- Six Cantatas, fs (1755): Bacchus and Ariadne, 1v, 2 fl, 2 ob, 2 hn, str, bc; Delia, 1v, str, bc; Frolick and Free (G. Granville), 1v, 2 ob, str, bc; Lydia (after Sappho), 1v, 2 bn, str, bc; The Morning, 1v, fl/rec, str, bc; The School of Anacreon, 1v, 2 hn, str, bc; Lydia and The Morning, both ed. R. Hufstader (New York, 1971)
- 5 odes in Del Canzionere d’Orazio (1757): Delle muse all’almo core, 1v, str, bc; Finche fedele il core, 2vv, 2 fl, str, bc; Finche fedele il core, 2vv, 2 vn, bc; Se vanti in Telefo, 1v, 2 hn, str, bc; Tu mi fuggi schizzinosa, 1v, 2 vn, bc [= Advice to Chloe]
- The Spring (cant.), 1v, str, bc, British Melody (1760)
- Love and Resentment (cant.), 1v, 2 cl, 2 vn, bc, Summer Amusement (1766)
- The Lover’s Recantation (cant.), 1v, 2 fl, 2 ob, str, bc; vs in The Winter’s Amusement (1761), fs, Lbl, ed. P. Young (Leipzig, 1988)
- Advice to Chloe (cant.), 1v, vns, bc, New Favourite Songs (1768)
- An Ode upon Dedicating a Building to Shakespeare (D. Garrick), 1769, speaker, S, S, S, S, T, Bar, SATB, orch; 9 nos. in vs (1769)
- Love and Resolution (musical dialogue), 1770, music lost
- Reffley Spring (cant.), 2vv, 2 vn, bc, vs (1772)
- Diana (cant.), 1v, 2 fl, 2 ob, 2 cl, 2 hn, 2 vn, bc; vs in The Vocal Grove (1774)
- Whittington’s Feast (secular orat, Arne, after Dryden: Alexander’s Feast), 1776, S, S, T, B, SATB, 2 fl, 2 ob, 2bn, 2 tpt, 2 hn, timps, drum, str, bc, fs, US-Wc
- A wretch long tortured with disdain (cant.), 1v, 2 fl, 2 ob, 2 hn, str, bc, full score GB-Lbl

== Sacred music ==
Compared to his most important English contemporaries, William Boyce and John Stanley, Arne's output of sacred music was small; the major reason was his Roman Catholic faith, which was at odds with the Church of England during his lifetime.

Completion	Title	Genre	Other details
1744	The Death of Abel	oratorio	Words after Metastasio, lost except for Hymn of Eve (printed 1756)
1744	Judith	oratorio	Words by I. Bickerstaff based on the Book of Judith, printed score without recits and choruses (1761), and a complete score at the British Library
unknown	Mass in F	mass	Written for a performance at Lulworth Castle in Dorset. The music is either lost or potentially the same as that of an anonymous composer. Written for three voices and organ sometime before 1770.
unknown	Mass in G	mass	Written for a performance at Lulworth Castle in Dorset. Written for four voices and organ sometime before 1770. Score still exists as does a revised version for fewer voices.
1770	Libera me	dirge	Written for the funeral of Francis Pemberton on 28 June 1770. Contains SSATB chorus, organ, soprano, tenor, and baritone soloists. Music exists and was printed by Oxford Publishing in 1950.
Unknown	O salutaris hostia	motet	Copy of the music exists at the British Library in London. Written sometime between 1771 and 1776.
1777	1 song in Samuel Arnold's The Prodigal Son	oratorio	Published in The Syren (1777).

== Stage works ==
Completion	Title	Genre	Length	Première	Librettist or playwright	Other details
1733	Rosamond	opera seria	3 acts	7 March 1733, London, Lincoln's Inn Fields	after Joseph Addison's 1704 opera	Revived as an afterpiece in 1740. The only existing score of the work is the afterpiece version.
1733	The Opera of Operas, or Tom Thumb the Great	burlesque opera	afterpiece	29 October 1733, London, Little Theatre	Eliza Haywood and William Hatchett, after Henry Fielding	Two songs from the work still exist, one in The British Musical Miscellany, vol. iii (1735) and the other in J. Markordt, Tom Thumb (1781). The other 16 songs are now lost.
1734	Dido and Aeneas	masque		12 January 1734, London, Little Theatre	Barton Booth	Only 2 songs still exist from The British Musical Miscellany, vol. i (1734). The rest of the masque is lost.
1734	Love and Glory	masque	2 acts	21 March 1734, London, Theatre Royal, Drury Lane	T. Phillips	Music now lost. The work contained 14 musical numbers.
1735	Harlequin Orpheus, or The Magical Pipe	pantomime		3 March 1735, London, Theatre Royal, Drury Lane	unknown	Music now lost.
1735	The Twin Rivals	incidental music for a play	2 acts	21 August 1735, London, Little Theater	George Farquhar	All of the music is lost with the exception of the overture which is the same used for Harlequin Restor’d.
1735	Harlequin Restor’d, or The Country Revels	pantomime		18 October 1735, London, Theatre Royal, Drury Lane		The overture is the only work to survive from this work with the exception of a few comic songs which may or may not be from the pantomime.
1735	Greenwich Park	incidental music for a play		10 November 1735, London, Theatre Royal, Drury Lane	William Mountfort	Music now lost.
1735	The Miser	incidental music for a play		13 November 1735, London, Theatre Royal, Drury Lane	Henry Fielding	Music now lost. Fielding's play is based on Molière's L'avare.
1736	Harlequin Restor’d, or Taste à la Mode	pantomime		12 January 1736, London, Theatre Royal, Drury Lane	Richard Charke	Music now lost.
1736	Zara	incidental music for a play		12 January 1736, London, Theatre Royal, Drury Lane	Aaron Hill	All music except a march is lost. Hill's play is based on Voltaire
1736	The Fall of Phaeton	masque		28 February 1736, London, Theatre Royal, Drury Lane	W. Pritchard	Only one of the six songs survives.
1736	The Rival Queens, or The Death of Alexander the Great	incidental music for a play		22 November 1736, London, Theatre Royal, Drury Lane	Nathaniel Lee	Only a single duet, published in The Songs in As You Like It and Twelfth Night (1741), survives.
1737	The King and the Miller of Mansfield	incidental music for a play		29 January 1737, London, Theatre Royal, Drury Lane	Robert Dodsley	Only one song published in The Musical Entertainer, vol. i (1737) survives.
1738	Comus	masque	3 acts	4 March 1738, London, Theatre Royal, Drury Lane	John Dalton, after John Milton's Comus	A copy of the full score published in 1740 is at the British Library. Arne revised the work as an afterpiece in 1772.
1738	The Tender Husband, or The Accomplish’d Fools	incidental music for a play		25 November 1738, London, Theatre Royal, Drury Lane	Richard Steele	Only a single song, published in The Songs in As You Like It and Twelfth Night (1741), survives.
1739	An Hospital for Fools	dramatic fable		15 November 1739, London, Theatre Royal, Drury Lane	James Miller	The four songs written for the play survive, but the dance music is now lost.
1740	Don John, or The Libertine Destroy’d	incidental music for a play		13 February 1740, London, Theatre Royal, Drury Lane	Thomas Shadwell	Contained several songs, dance of shepherds, and dance of furies. The music is now lost.
1740	Lethe, or Esop in the Shades	incidental music for a play		1 April 1740, London, Theatre Royal, Drury Lane	David Garrick	Arne wrote only one of the songs for this play, which was published in The Agreeable Musical Choice, vol. vi (1754). The other music for the production was composed by W. Boyce.
1740	Alfred	opera	3 acts	1 August 1740, Cliveden House, Berks.	David Mallet and James Thomson	Originally written as a masque to celebrate the accession of George II in 1740. Was later revised into an all sung oratorio in 1745 and then greatly expanded into its final version as an opera in 1753. A score of the final version still survives.
1740	Oedipus, King of Thebes	incidental music for a play		19 November 1740, London, Theatre Royal, Drury Lane	John Dryden and Nathaniel Lee (1678), after Sophocles	Contained one song and instrumental music for the sacrificial scene. Music now lost.
1740	The Tempest	incidental music for a play	4 acts	28 November 1740, London, Theatre Royal, Drury Lane	From The Tempest, or the Enchanted Island: A Comedy (1667) libretto by John Dryden and William Davenant. Original compositions initially attributedHenry Purcell, but likely John Weldon. Later, Thomas Shadwell composed his music (1674). After William Shakespeare.	Contained several songs as well as instrumental music by Arne. A number of the songs still survive in various song collections published during the 1770s. Two songs appear in Nine Shakespeare Songs by Thomas Augustine Arne (London, 1963).
1740	As You Like It	incidental music for a play	4 acts	20 December 1740, London, Theatre Royal, Drury Lane	William Shakespeare	Contained several songs as well as instrumental music by Arne. A number of the songs still survive in various song collections published during the 1770s. Three songs appear in Nine Shakespeare Songs by Thomas Augustine Arne (London, 1963).
1741	Twelfth Night, or What You Will	incidental music for a play	4 acts	15 January 1741, London, Theatre Royal, Drury Lane	William Shakespeare	Contained several songs as well as instrumental music by Arne. Only three of the songs still survive.
1741	The Peasant’s Triumph on the Death of the Wild Boar	ballet		12 February 1741, London, Theatre Royal, Drury Lane		Some of the dance music survives.
1741	The Merchant of Venice	incidental music for a play	4 acts	14 February 1741, London, Theatre Royal, Drury Lane	William Shakespeare	Two songs and one duet survive.
1741	The Blind Beggar of Bethnal Green	ballad opera	2 acts	3 April 1741, London, Theatre Royal, Drury Lane	Robert Dodsley	Seven of the nine songs survive.
1741	The Rehearsal	incidental music for a play	4 acts	21 November 1741, London, Royal College of Music	George Villiers, 2nd Duke of Buckingham	Only one duet survives.
1742	The Judgment of Paris	masque	1 act	12 March 1742, London, Theatre Royal, Drury Lane	William Congreve (1700)	A score, including arias and choruses, dated from 1745 still exists.
1742	Miss Lucy in Town	ballad farce		6 May 1742, London, Theatre Royal, Drury Lane	Henry Fielding	Revived in 1770 as The Country Madcap. Contained 10 songs but all of the music is now lost.
1743	The Mock Doctor	farce		2 May 1743, Dublin, Aungier St Theatre	Joseph Addison	Although the music is likely by Arne, an absolute assertion of his authorship can not be established. All of the music is now lost.
1744	Theodosius, or The Force of Love	incidental music for a play		26 April 1744, Dublin, Smock Alley Theatre	Nathaniel Lee	All five musical numbers still exist.
1744	Cymbeline	incidental music for a play		8 November 1744, London, Little Theatre	Theophilus Cibber, after Shakespeare. Text by William Collins.	Only the dirge still exists.
1745	The Temple of Dullness	burlesque opera	3 acts	17 January 1745, London, Theatre Royal, Drury Lane	Colley Cibber, after interludes in Lewis Theobald's The Happy Captive	Originally included 16 songs. All of the music is now lost.
1745	The Picture, or The Cuckold in Conceit	incidental music for a play		11 February 1745, London, Theatre Royal, Drury Lane	James Miller, after Molière's Sganarelle	Only one song survives.
1745	King Pepin’s Campaign	burlesque opera	2 acts	15 April 1745, London, Theatre Royal, Drury Lane	William Shirley	Contained 19 musical numbers. Music now lost.
1746	Harlequin Incendiary, or Colombine Cameron	pantomime		3 March 1746, London, Theatre Royal, Drury Lane		Contained 14 musical numbers. Music now lost.
1746	The She-Gallants, or Once a Lover and Always a Lover	incidental music for a play		13 March 1746, London, Theatre Royal, Drury Lane	George Granville, 1st Baron Lansdowne (1695)	Only one song survives.
1747	The Sheep-Shearing, or Florizel and Perdita	incidental music for a play		1747, Dublin, Smock Alley Theatre	Macnamara Morgan, after Shakespeare's The Winter's Tale	Music now lost. One song survives in "A Collection Consisting of Favourite Songs and Cantatas" by Th Arne. IMSLP317040-PMLP512228-Arne_-_Collection
1747	The Wild Goose Chase	incidental music for a play		7 March 1747, London, Theatre Royal, Drury Lane	John Fletcher	Only one song written for the play which is now lost.
1748	The Foundling	incidental music for a play		13 February 1748, London, Theatre Royal, Drury Lane	Edward Moore	Only one song written for the play which still survives.
1748	The Provok’d Wife	incidental music for a play		21 March 1748, London, Theatre Royal, Drury Lane	David Garrick, after John Vanbrugh's The Provoked Wife (1697)	Only one song of the five written for the play still survives.
1748	The Nunnery Expedition	incidental music for a play		advertised 20 April 1748, London, Theatre Royal, Drury Lane	unknown	Never performed and the music is now lost.
1748	Much Ado About Nothing	incidental music for a play		14 November 1748, London, Theatre Royal, Drury Lane	Shakespeare	Only one song written for the play which still survives.
1749	The Triumph of Peace	masque		21 February 1749, London, Theatre Royal, Drury Lane	Robert Dodsley	Only one of the seven songs written for the masque still survives.
1749	The Muses' Looking Glass	incidental music for a play		9 March 1749, London, Covent Garden Theatre	Thomas Randolph (1630)	Only one song written for the play which still survives.
1749	Henry and Emma, or The Nut-Brown Maid	musical drama		31 March 1749, London, Covent Garden Theatre	Thomas Holt, after Matthew Prior's "Henry and Emma, a poem, upon the model of The Nut-brown Maid" (1709), based on the 15th Century ballad The Nut-Brown Maid	Contained 15 musical numbers of which all but two, the overture and a song also used in The Masque of Alfred (1757), are now lost. Controversy over Authorship.
1750	Don Saverio	comic opera		15 February 1750, London, Theatre Royal, Drury Lane	By the composer. Controversy over authorship.	Only two of the eighteen songs written for the opera still survives; one that was printed in London Magazine (1752) and another that was reused in Masque of Alfred (1757).
1750	Harlequin Mountebank, or The Squire Electrified	pantomime		London, New Wells, Clerkenwell, 16 April 1750		Music now lost.
1750	The Sacrifice of Iphigenia	entertainment		London, New Wells, Clerkenwell, 16 April 1750		One song still survives that was published in London Magazine (1750).
1750	Romeo and Juliet	incidental music for a play		28 September 1750, London, Royal Opera House, Covent Garden	Shakespeare	Only a dirge written for the play which was printed c. 1765
1751	The Country Lasses, or The Custom of the Manor	incidental music for a play		14 December 1751, London, Royal Opera House, Covent Garden	Charles Johnson (original play 1715)	One song published in Vocal Melody, iv (1752)
1752	Harlequin Sorcerer	pantomime		11 February 1752, London, Royal Opera House, Covent Garden	Lewis Theobald's Harlequin Sorcerer: With the Loves of Pluto and Prosperpine (1752)	Twelve musical numbers written of which four solo songs, one duet, and a minuet survive.
1752	The Oracle	incidental music for a play		17 March 1752, London, Royal Opera House, Covent Garden	Susannah Maria Arne Cibber, who translated it from L'Oracle Germain-François Poullain de Saint-Foix (1740)	One song survives, published in Vocal Melody, iv (1752).
1752	The Drummer, or The Haunted House	incidental music for a play		8 December 1752, London, Royal Opera House, Covent Garden	Joseph Addison	Only one musical number survives.
1754	Eliza	opera	3 acts	29 May 1754, London, Little Theatre, Haymarket	Richard Rolt	An incomplete score was published in 1757. Parts of act 1 and act 2 are now lost.
1755	Britannia	masque	2 acts	9 May 1755, London, Theatre Royal, Drury Lane		A complete score published in 1755 still exists.
1756	Injured Honour, or The Earl of Westmorland	incidental music for a play		8 March 1756, Dublin, Smock Alley Theatre	H. Brooke	Contained an anthem, dirge, and triumphal hymn. All of the music is now lost.
1756	The Pincushion Farce	farce		20 March 1756, Dublin, Smock Alley Theatre	Most likely by Arne himself but attributed to John Gay	All of the music is now lost.
1756	The Painter’s Breakfast	incidental music for a play		2 April 1756, Dublin, Smock Alley Theatre	Beaumont Brenan	All of the music is now lost.
1756	Catherine and Petruchio	incidental music for a play		2 April 1756, Dublin, Smock Alley Theatre	David Garrick, after Shakespeare's The Taming of the Shrew	All of the music is now lost.
1756	Mercury Harlequin	pantomime		27 December 1756, London, Theatre Royal, Drury Lane	Henry Woodward	Two songs survive.
1757	The Fair Penitent	incidental music for a play		22 April 1757, London, Royal Opera House, Covent Garden	Nicholas Rowe, after The Fatal Dowry by Philip Massinger and Nathan Field (1632)	All of the music is now lost.
1757	Isabella, or The Fatal Marriage	incidental music for a play		2 December 1757, London, Theatre Royal, Drury Lane	David Garrick, after Thomas Southerne's The Fatal Marriage, or The Innocent Adultery (1694), from Aphra Behn's novel The Nun or the Perjur'd Beauty (1689)	Two songs survive that are published in The Agreeable Musical Choice, viii (1758).
1758	The Prophetess, or The History of Dioclesian	musical play		1 February 1758, London, Royal Opera House, Covent Garden	Thomas Betterton, after John Fletcher and Phillip Massinger	One of the six musical numbers survives.
1758	The Sultan, or Solyman and Zaida	masque		23 November 1758, London, Royal Opera House, Covent Garden		Originally performed with a revised version of The Prophetess, or The History of Dioclesian. Only a duet survives.
1759	The Ambitious Stepmother	incidental music for a play		1 February 1759, London, Theatre Royal, Drury Lane	Nicholas Rowe	All of the music is lost.
1759	Cymbeline	incidental music for a play		15 February 1759, London, Royal Opera House, Covent Garden	William Hawkins, after Shakespeare	Only a dirge survives which was later re-used in The Winter’s Amusement (1761).
1759	The Beggar's Opera	ballad opera	3 acts	10 October 1759, London, Royal Opera House, Covent Garden	John Gay	Arne added a few new songs, a hornpipe, and made some small revisions to the original music by Gay.
1760	The Desert Island: A Dramatic Poem in Three Acts	incidental music for a play		24 January 1760, Theatre Royal, Drury Lane	Arthur Murphy inspired by L'isola disabitata, play by Pietro Metastasio(1753), opera based on the same by Joseph Haydn (1779), with a prologue written and spoken by David Garrick in the character of a drunken poet	One song survives.
1760	The Jovial Crew, or The Merry Beggars	comic opera	2 acts	14 February 1760, London, Royal Opera House, Covent Garden	Adapted from A Jovial Crew by Richard Brome (1641); readapted as The Jovial Crew by Matthew Concanen, Edward Roome, and Sir William Youge (1731) as a musical.	7 songs survive which were published in A Collection of Songs, ix (c1760). The opera was revived as The Ladies' Frolick at Drury Lane on 7 May 1770.
1760	Thomas and Sally, or The Sailor’s Return	comic opera	2 acts	28 November 1760, London, Royal Opera House, Covent Garden	Isaac John Bickerstaff	Full score published in 1761 and republished in 1977.
1761	The Way to Keep Him	incidental music for a play	5 acts	10 January 1761, London, Theatre Royal, Drury Lane	Arthur Murphy	Two songs survive.
1761	The Provok’d Husband, or A Journey to London	incidental music for a play		7 April 1761, London, Royal Opera House, Covent Garden	Colley Cibber (1728), based on a fragment of a play by John Vanbrugh (1726)	Two songs survive which were published in The Winter’s Amusement, xiii (1761).
1762	Artaxerxes	serious opera	3 acts	2 February 1762, London, Royal Opera House, Covent Garden	Arne, after Pietro Metastasio's text of Artaserse (1730)	A published score was made in 1762 without the recitatives and final chorus. However, some of the missing music was published in The Syren (1777) and in an 1820 re-publication by J. Addison.
1762	Beauty and Virtue Reconciled	serenata		26 February 1762, London, Theatre Royal, Drury Lane	Arne, after Pietro Metastasio	All of the music is lost.
1762	Love in a Village	pasticcio/comic opera	3 acts	8 December 1762, London, Theatre Royal, Drury Lane	Isaac John Bickerstaff, after Charles Johnson's ballad operaThe Village Opera (1729). Johnson's work was part of the wave after John Gay's Beggar's Opera.	The work contains 42 musical numbers of which only five were newly composed works by Arne. The other music is made up of 13 pieces borrowed from Arne's earlier stage works, a new overture was by C. F. Abel, and 23 songs by other composers, including Geminiani and Galuppi, albeit with new texts. Full score survives.
1763	The Birth of Hercules	masque		Never performed but was rehearsed for performance in London, Royal Opera House, Covent Garden (1763)	William Shirley (also the author of Electra, a Tragedy)	Nineteen musical numbers were composed for the work but all of the music is now lost.
1764	The Arcadian Nuptials	masque		19 January 1764, London, Royal Opera House, Covent Garden	Most likely Arne.	Only a dialogue survives which was published in A Favourite Collection of Songs (1764).
1764	The Guardian Out-witted	comic opera	3 acts	12 December 1764, London, Royal Opera House, Covent Garden	Arne	Only the overture survives which was published in Periodical Overtures, xxvii (1770).
1765	L’Olimpiade	opera seria	3 acts	27 April 1765, London, Kings Theatre in the Haymarket	Translation from Giovanni Gualberto Bottarelli(?), after Pietro Metastasio's 1733 libretto for Antonio Caldara's opera	All of the music is now lost.
1765	The Summer’s Tale	pasticcio/ musical comedy	3 acts	6 December 1765, London, Royal Opera House, Covent Garden	Richard Cumberland	Contained two new songs by Arne and 2 songs from previous works by Arne which were arranged by S. Arnold. The play was later compressed into an afterpiece, Amelia (1768)
1766	Miss in her Teens, or The Medley of Lovers	farce		25 April 1766, London, Theatre Royal, Drury Lane	David Garrick, after Florent Carton (Dancourt)'s La parisienne	One song survives.
1768	Lionel and Clarissa	pasticcio/comic opera	3 acts	25 February 1768, London, Theatre Royal, Drury Lane	Isaac John Bickerstaff	The work contained 1 new song by Arne and was arranged by C. Dibdin.
1770	King Arthur, or The British Worthy	masque	3 acts	13 December 1770, London, Theatre Royal, Drury Lane	David Garrick, after John Dryden	Contains revisions of Henry Purcell's King Arthur and 10 new songs by Arne.
1771	The Fairy Prince	masque	3 acts	12 November 1771, London, Royal Opera House, Covent Garden	George Colman the elder, after Ben Jonson's Oberon, the Faery Prince (1611)	The score was published in 1771 but without the dance music, recitatives, and some of the choruses.
1772	Squire Badger	burletta	2 acts	16 March 1772, London, Little Theatre	Arne, after Henry Fielding's Don Quixote in England (1729)	Only 1 of the 15 musical numbers survives. The work was revived under the name The Sot at the Little Theatre on 16 February 1775.
1772	The Cooper	comic opera	2 acts	10 June 1772, London, Little Theatre	Arne, transladapting from the libretto by Nicolas-Médard Audinot and Antoine François Quétant’s Le tonnelier	Published in 1772 and re-published in 1956.
1772	Elfrida	dramatic poem or opera	5 acts	21 November 1772, London, Royal Opera House, Covent Garden	George Colman the elder, after William Mason's "Elfrida, A Dramatic Poem, Written on the Model of The Ancient Greek Tragedy" (1752)	Published in 1772.
1772	The Rose	comic opera	3 acts	2 December 1772, London, Theatre Royal, Drury Lane	Most likely Arne	Of the 20 musical numbers only the overture survives.
1772	The Pigmy Revels, or Harlequin Foundling	pantomime		26 December 1772, London, Theatre Royal, Drury Lane	J. Messink	Charles Dibdin wrote most of the music for this work. Arne only composed the Morris Dance which was published in 1773.
1773	Alzuma: A Tragedy in Five Acts	incidental music for a play	5 acts	23 February 1773, London, Royal Opera House, Covent Garden	Arthur Murphy inspired by John Dryden's The Indian Emperour, or the Conquest of Mexico by the Spaniards, being the Sequel of The Indian Queen (1665) and Voltaire's play (also inspired by the Dryden), Alzire, ou les Américains (1736)	Two songs were written, Procession of Virgins and Ode to the Sun, both of which are now lost.
1773	The Trip to Portsmouth	comic opera		11 August 1773, London, Little Theatre	George Alexander Stevens	Vocal music by Dibdin; overture borrowed from The Rose and 2 new dance tunes by Arne.
1773	Achilles in Petticoats	burlesque opera	3 acts	16 December 1773, London, Royal Opera House, Covent Garden	George Colman the elder, after John Gay's Achilles: A Ballad Opera (1733)	Vocal score published in 1774.
1774	Henry and Emma (revised)	musical drama	3 acts	13 April 1774, London, Royal Opera House, Covent Garden	Sir Henry Bate Dudley, 1st Baronet, after Matthew Prior's "Henry and Emma, a poem, upon the model of The Nut-brown Maid" (1709), based on the 15th Century ballad The Nut-Brown Maid	Four new songs were written of which all are now lost.
1775	May-Day, or The Little Gipsy	musical farce	2 acts	28 October 1775, London, Theatre Royal, Drury Lane	David Garrick	Vocal score published in 1776.
1776	Phoebe at Court	operetta	2 acts	22 February 1776, London, Little Theatre	Arne, after Robert Lloyd's The Capricious Lovers (1764), which was inspired by Charles-Simon Favart's Le caprice amoureux ou Ninette à la cour: comédie en trois actes (1755)	Music is now lost.
1776	The Seraglio	comic opera		25 November 1776, London, Royal Opera House, Covent Garden	Charles Dibdin and Edward Thompson	Only one song by Arne. The rest of the music is by Dibdin and Arnold. Music now lost.
1776	Caractacus	dramatic poem or opera	5 acts	6 December 1776, London, Royal Opera House, Covent Garden	After the 1759 poem by William Mason	Twentyone musical numbers written. Music now lost.
1777	Love Finds the Way	pasticcio/comic opera	3 acts	18 November 1777, London, Royal Opera House, Covent Garden	Thomas Hull, after Arthur Murphy's The School for Guardians (1767)	Music arranged by Fisher and contained an unknown number of new songs by Arne. Music now lost.
	Trick upon Trick	ballad opera		unknown production	R. Fabian	Two songs survive which were published in The Winter’s Amusement (1761). Possibly performed at Covent Garden as a part of The Comical Resentment, or Trick for Trick on 26 March 1759.

== Works misattributed to Arne ==
- The Most Celebrated Aires in the Opera of Tom Thumb (London, 1733), by John Frederick Lampe
- Ode upon St. Cecilia’s Day, now lost, by Charles Burney
- Caractacus (c1795), possibly by Charles Wesley junior
- Epithalamium, At Cana’s Feast, attribution doubtful
- Mass in D by Alphonse d'Eve
- The hymn tune "Helmsley", based on an anonymous Dublin air.

== Sources ==
- Peter Holman, Todd Gilman: "Thomas Augustine Arne", Grove Music Online ed. L. Macy. (subscription access)
- Davey, Henry (2007). History of English Music. Kessinger Publishing Company. ISBN 978-1-4286-0670-8.
