= De Gruytters carillon book =

1746 manuscript of carillon music

- Carillon music by Joannes de Gruytters
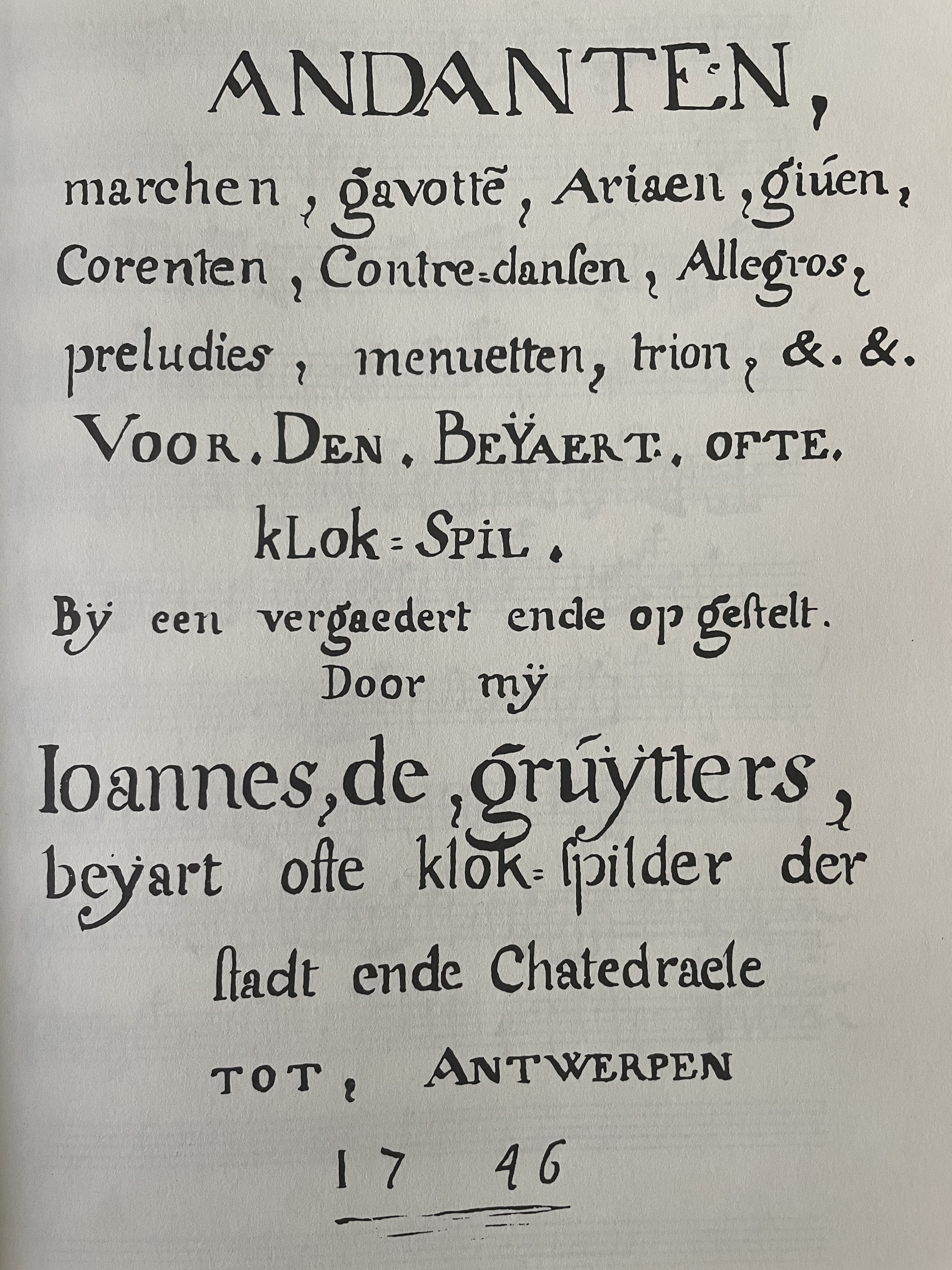
- Title page of the notebook written in Dutch
- Full title: Andantes, marches, gavottes, arias, gigues, courantes, contra dances, allegros, preludes, minuets, trios, etc. etc. for the carillon or bell-play, gathered together and arranged by myself, Joannes de Gruytters, carillon- or bell-player of the city and cathedral of Antwerp, 1746
- Year: 1746
- Period: Baroque
- Movements: 194 pieces

The De Gruytters carillon book (Dutch: De Gruijtters beiaardboek) is a manuscript notebook that the Flemish Baroque musician Joannes de Gruytters used for performance on the carillon of the city of Antwerp. It contains 194 pieces of music, mostly arrangements and a few original compositions, in the form of marches, gavottes, arias, gigues, preludes, and minuets, among others.

The manuscript, dated 1746 and discovered in 1922, provides a glimpse into the music of the 18th century that was often played on carillons. It is preserved at the Royal Conservatoire Antwerp.

== History ==
In the 18th century, the Antwerp Cathedral possessed two carillons cast by the Hemony brothers. One belonged to the city of Antwerp, and the other was owned by the cathedral. On 22 October 1740, following the death of the previous appointee, Joannes de Gruytters (1709–1772) was appointed the carillonneur of the two instruments. He had performed in a competition to win the job. To financially support himself and his family, De Gruytters also played the cathedral chapel's organ and in 1746 was engaged as a violinist for the chapel and the local theatre. In March 1746, the theatre was destroyed in a fire, which likely gave him the free time to compile a notebook of music for the carillons.

In 1922, Prosper Verheyden, clerk of the Antwerp city council and bibliophile, discovered the De Gruytters manuscript at a book auction in a pile of materials marked for their little value. At the time, Verheyden was a member of a group of Flemish Belgians who were organizing around Jef Denyn and his carillon school as a means to disseminate Flemish culture. Verheyden understood that carillon music manuscripts prior to 1900 were rare, and that he therefore discovered an item of value to carillonneurs and musicologists. He and his friend purchased the manuscript and donated it to the Royal Conservatoire Antwerp for preservation.

Verheyden studied the new manuscript and presented his findings in an address at the World Carillon Congress in 1922. It was later published as an article in The Guild of Carillonneurs in North America (GCNA)'s 1949 volume of The Bulletin. An urtext edition of the De Gruytters manuscript was published by the Royal Eijsbouts bell foundry in 1968 and again by Broekmans & Van Poppel in 1971. The GCNA published its own set of selections from the De Gruytters manuscript in 1980, edited by Albert Gerken; it published another set in 2004, edited by John Gouwens.

== Significance ==
De Gruytters' manuscript is the earliest-known collection of carillon music that was clearly written for manual play on a carillon keyboard rather than an automatic playing drum. The latter is the case for other sources of carillon music of this time period and earlier. More importantly, it shows that the instrument was attracting better musicians, some of whom were determined to contribute to the carillon repertoire.

== Contents ==
The manuscript is an in folio of 80 sheets, 320 by 205 millimetres (12.6 by 8.1 in) in size. The pages, beginning on the second sheet, are numbered 1 to 152 and are followed by a table of contents at the end. The front page of the manuscript is titled "ANDANTEN, / marchen, gavotte, Ariaen, giúen, / Corenten, Contre-danſen, Allegros, / preludies, menuetten, trion, &. &. / Voor. Den. BEŸAERT. OFTE. / kLok-SPIL. / Bÿ een vergardert ende op geſtelt. / Door mÿ / Ioannes, de, grúÿtters, / beÿart ofte klok-ſpilder der / ſtadt ende Chatedraele. / TOT, ANTWERPEN / 1746", which translates to "Andantes, marches, gavottes, arias, gigues, courantes, contra dances, allegros, preludes, minuets, trios, etc. etc. for the carillon or bell-play, gathered together and arranged by myself, Joannes de Gruytters, carillon- or bell-player of the city and cathedral of Antwerp, 1746".

The whole book contains 194 individual pieces of Baroque music, numbered 1 to 190; the last four were not numbered. De Gruytters signed his initials three times (numbers 143, 168, and 182) and provided dates eight times (numbers 88, 141, 143, 168, 175, 182, 190, 192). He attributes two additional works to himself in the table of contents (numbers 172 and 179).

The majority of the pieces are written in two-part harmony, consisting of a soprano part with an underlying basso continuo. Harmonic additions are sporadically added. One exception is number 93, which has four-part harmony. To De Gruytters, the melodic line, accentuated with ornaments, had more importance than the harmonic treatment of each work, which is standard practice for 18th century music. In his edition of the manuscript, Albert Gerken writes that many of the selections are unplayable in their original form and that De Gruytters must have played them ad libitum. Gerken claims they contain many errors or simply illegible notation, showing that De Gruytters either transcribed them by listening alone or carelessly copied the sheet music.

No.	Page	Title on the table of contents	Title on the music	Key	Composer	Notes
1	1	Marche van hanover	Marche De Hanover	D major	Franz Xaver Richter	At the end, De Gruytters writes: "Compose par: M: Richter a hanover."
2	2	Marche D♯	Marche	D major	Unknown	
3	2–3	Menuet D♯	Menuet	D major	Unknown	
4	3	Menuet D♯	Menuet	D major	Unknown	
5	4	Marche D♯	Marche	D major	Unknown	
6	5	Menuet D♯ Locatelli	Menuet da p: Locatelli	D major	Pietro Locatelli	
7	5	Menuet D♯	Menuet	D major	Unknown	
8	6	Marche D♯	Marche	D major	Unknown	
9	6	Menuet D♯	Menuet	D major	Pietro Locatelli	
10	7	Marche van hardtop D♯	Marche D'hartop	D major	Unknown	
11	8–9	Marche van Lingie D♯	Marche De prins De Lingie cavalerie	D major	Unknown	
12	9	Allemande D♯	Allemande	D major	Unknown	
13	9	Menuet D♯	Menuet	D major	Unknown	
14	10	Menuet de la reine D♯	Menuet De La reine	D major	Unknown	
15	10–11	Suitte D♯	Suitte	D major	Unknown	
16	11	Contredans D♯	Conterdans	D major	Unknown	
17	11	Menuet D♯	Menuet	D major	Unknown	
18	12	Cruÿs Capelleken D♯	Cruÿs Capelleken	D major	Unknown	
19	12–13	Burschen omeganck D♯	Den brusschen Omeganck of De Drÿ Sotten	D major	Unknown	
20	13	Menuet G	Menuet	G major	Unknown	
21	14	Marche G	Marche	G major	Unknown	
22	15	Giga G	Giga	G major	Unknown	
23	15	Menuet D♮	Menuet	D minor	Unknown	
24	16–17	Giga Corelli A♮	Giga Corelli	A minor	Arcangelo Corelli	
25	17	Menuet A♮	Menuet	A minor	Unknown	
26	18	Soet Chatrintien G	Soet chatarintjen	G major	Unknown	
27	18	Soet Chatrintien G	Soet chatarintjen	G major	Unknown	Equivalent to No. 26 transposed up one octave
28	18–19	La bourbonoise G Couprin	La borbonoise	G major	François Couperin	
29	19	Menuet G	Menuet	G major	Unknown	
30	20	Menuet a quatre D♮	Menuet a quatre	D minor	Unknown	
31	20	Menuet D♮	Menuet	D minor	Unknown	
32	21	Menuet G	Menuet	G major	Unknown	
33	22	Marche F	Marche	F major	Unknown	
34	23	Menuet F	Menuet	F major	Unknown	
35	23	Menuet F	Menuet	F major	Unknown	
36	24	Aria A♮	Aria	A minor	Unknown	
37	24	Mattelote A♮	Air	A minor	Unknown	
38	25	Aria G	Air	G major	Unknown	
39	25	Contredans D♯	Conterdans	D major	Unknown	
40	26	Marche F	Marche	F major	Unknown	
41	27	Menuet F	Menuet	F major	Unknown	
42	28–29	Andante G Raÿck	Andante par M: Raÿck	G major	Dieudonné Raijck	
43	29	Gavotte G handel	Gavotta Del Sig: handel	G major	George Frideric Handel	
44	30	Menuet G	Menuet	G major	Unknown	
45	30	Menuet G	Menuet	G major	Unknown	
46	30	Menuet G	Menuet	G major	Unknown	
47	31	Menuet G	Menuet	G major	Unknown	
48	31	Giga C	Apel	C major	Unknown	
49	32–33	Andante D♮ fiocco	Andante	D minor	Joseph-Hector Fiocco	Transcription from Fiocco's Suite in G Major, Op. 1, No. 1.
50	33	Menuet D♮	Menuet	D minor	Unknown	
51	34	Marche F	Marche	F major	Unknown	
52	35	Menuet F	Menuet	F major	Unknown	
53	35	Menuet C	Menuet	C major	Unknown	
54	36	Giga Corelli A♮	Giga De Correlli	A minor	Arcangelo Corelli	
55	37	Air G	Aria	G major	Unknown	
56	38–39	Andante C Locatelli	Andante	C major	Pietro Locatelli	
57	40–41	Andante G croes	Sonata Andante	G major	Henri-Jacques de Croes	
58	42–43	Giga G croes	Giga Allegro	G major	Henri-Jacques de Croes	
59	44–45	Menuet G croes	Menuet alternatif	G major	Henri-Jacques de Croes	
60	45	Menuet G♭ croes	Suÿtte	G minor	Henri-Jacques de Croes	
61	46–47	Andante F renotte	Andante	F major	Hubert Renotte	At the end, De Gruytters writes: "Author Renotte"
62	48–49	Andante G Raÿck	Andante	G major	Dieudonné Raijck	
63	49	Vivace G Raÿck	Vivace	G major	Dieudonné Raijck	At the end, De Gruytters writes: "Auth: Mr Raÿck."
64	50–51	Andante G Raÿck	Andante	G major	Dieudonné Raijck	
65	52–53	Allegro F Scheppers	Allegro	F major	Scheppers (either Pieter or his brother Boudewijn)	
66	54–55	Andante D♯ Raÿck	Andante	D major	Dieudonné Raijck	
67	55	Menuet D♯	Menuet	D major	Unknown	
68	56	Marche C	Marche van duÿtsmeester	C major	Unknown	
69	56–57	Suitte C	Suitte	C major	Unknown	
70	57	Menuet C	Menuet	C major	Unknown	
71	58–59	La grotte De versaille A	La grotte De versalies	A minor	Unknown	
72	59	Menuet A♮	Menuet	A minor	Unknown	
73	60–61	Corrente A♮ Lulli	Courante	A minor	Jean-Baptiste Lully	
74	61	Air A♮	Air	A minor	Unknown	
75	62	Menuet A♮	Menuet	A minor	Unknown	
76	62	Menuet A♮	Menuet	A minor	Unknown	
77	62–63	Menuet A♮	Menuet	A minor	Unknown	
78	63	Menuet G	Menuet	G major	Unknown	
79	64	Marche G	Marche De Los rios	G major	Unknown	
80	64–65	Air G	Aria	G major	Unknown	
81	65	Menuet G	Menuet	G major	Unknown	
82	66	Preludium C	Preludium quinti toni	C major	Unknown	
83	66–67	Menuet C De fesch	Menuet par De fesch	C major	Willem de Fesch	
84	67	Menuet C De fesch	Suitte	C major	Willem de Fesch	
85	68–69	La bergeri C Couprin	La bergeri	C major	François Couperin	
86	70	Andante C	Andante	C major	François Couperin	
87	71	Allegro A♮	Allegro moderato	A minor	Unknown	
88	72	Marche C	Marche Du grand turcq	C major	Unknown	At the end, De Gruytters writes: "Den 14 ougst 1746 in Antwerpen"
89	73	Menuet D♮ De Comte De Sax	Menuet De Comte De Sax 1746 composé	D minor	Unknown	
90	73	Menuet D♮	Menuet	D minor	Unknown	
91	74	Marche G	Marche van Drouvigen oliver	G major	Colfs (either Antoon or his son Josef)	
92	75	Andante A♮	Andante	A minor	Unknown	
93	76	Marche C	Marche De konik Seyx	C major	Unknown	
94	77	Marche G van hessen	Marche van hessen	G major	Unknown	
95	78	Gavotte A♮	Gavotta vivace	A minor	Unknown	
96	79	Giga C	Giga	C major	François Couperin	At the end, De Gruytters writes: "par Couprin"
97	80	Menuet G	Menuet	G major	Unknown	
98	80	Menuet G	Menuet	G major	Unknown	
99	81	Marche G	Marche De Wourenbrandt	G major	Unknown	
100	82	Marche G	Marche De malbrouk	G major	Unknown	Named after the Duke of Marlborough
101	83	Marche G	Marche van beÿeren	G major	Unknown	
102	83	Menuet G	Menuet	G major	Unknown	
103	84	Contredans D♮	Contredanse	D minor	Unknown	
104	84–85	Menuet D	Menuet	D minor	Unknown	
105	85	Aria A♮	Aria	A minor	Unknown	
106	85	Giga C	Untitled	C major	Unknown	
107	86	Menuet D♮	Menuet	D minor	Unknown	
108	87	Marche G	Marche	G major	Unknown	
109	88	Menuet G baustetter	Menuet par Mr baustetter	G major	Jan Koenraad Baustetter	
110	88	Menuet G	Menuet	G major	Unknown	
111	89	Menuet G	Menuet	G major	Unknown	
112	90	Marche C	Marche van beÿeren	C major	Unknown	
113	90	Menuet C	Menuet	C major	Unknown	
114	91	Marche C Colfs	Marche par M: Colfs a Malines	C major	Colfs (either Antoon or his son Josef)	
115	92	Menuet C	Menuet	C major	Unknown	
116	92–93	Menuet C	Suitte	C major	Unknown	
117	93	Menuet C touscaen	Menuet touscaen	C major	Unknown	
118	94	Air G	Aria	G major	Unknown	
119	94	La fanaticq G	La fanaticq	G major	Unknown	
120	95	Marche D♮	Marche van de begÿnen	D minor	Unknown	
121	95	Marche C	Marche van keÿserug	C major	Unknown	
122	96	Gavotta A♮ De fesch	Tempo di gavotta	A minor	Willem de Fesch	
123	97	Con variatio	Double Di tempo Di gavotta	C minor	Willem de Fesch	
124	98	Contredans G	Untitled	G major	Unknown	
125	98	Contredans G	Contredanze	G major	Unknown	
126	99	Rigodon C	Rigodon	C major	Unknown	
127	99	Suitte C	Suitte	C major	Unknown	
128	100	Menuet D♮ Raÿck	Menuet par Mr Raÿck	D minor	Dieudonné Raijck	
129	100–01	Menuet D♮ Raÿck	Suitte 2em menuet	D minor	Dieudonné Raijck	
130	102	Condredans D♮	Mamatje Lief	D minor	Unknown	
131	102	Contredans G	Contredanse	G major	Unknown	
132	103	Menuet G	Menuet	G major	Unknown	
133	103	Menuet G	Suitte	G major	Unknown	
134	104	Menuet D♮	Menuet	D minor	Unknown	
135	104–05	Marche C	Marche	C major	Unknown	
136	105	Marche C	Marche	C major	Unknown	
137	105	Menuet C	Menuet	C major	Unknown	
138	106	Gavotte D♮ fiocco	Gavotta par Mr fiocco	D minor	Joseph-Hector Fiocco	
139	106–07	Gavotte D♯ fiocco	Suitte 2me gavotte	D major	Joseph-Hector Fiocco	
140	107	Gavotte A♮	Gavotte	A minor	Unknown	At the end, De Gruytters writes: "Fin wevers marche."
141	108–09	Andante G baustetter	Andante	G major	Jan Koenraad Baustetter	At the end, De Gruytters writes: "22 junÿ 1744."
142	110	Marche du Roÿ D♯	La Marche Du Roÿ	D major	Unknown	
143	110	Menuet D♯	Menuet	D major	Joannes de Gruytters	At the end, De Gruytters writes: "16 ougst 1746. i D. G."
144	111	Menuet D♮	Menuet	D minor	Unknown	
145	111	Menuet G	Menuet	G major	Unknown	
146	112–13	La ferlande C	Untitled	C major	Unknown	
147	113	Marche D♯	Marche	D major	Unknown	
148	114	Marche G Dese is er 2 mael	Marche	G major	Unknown	Title translates to "This is the 2nd time"
149	114–15	Menuet G croes	Menuet par M Croes	G major	Henri-Jacques de Croes	
150	115	Marche D♯	Marche	D major	Unknown	
151	116	Menuet G croes	Menuet alternatif par croes	G major	Henri-Jacques de Croes	
152	116–17	Menuet G♭ croes	Trio	G minor	Henri-Jacques de Croes	
153	117	Menuet G croes	Menuet alternatif	G major	Henri-Jacques de Croes	
154	118	Menuet G croes	Menuet champetre par M croes	G major	Henri-Jacques de Croes	
155	118–19	Menuet G♭ croes	Trio	G minor	Henri-Jacques de Croes	
156	119	Le carlion Dunÿkercke G	het Carillion van Duÿnkerke	G major	Unknown	Named after Dunkirk
157	120	Menuet D♯ croes	Menuet alternatif par M croes	D major	Henri-Jacques de Croes	
158	120–21	Menuet D♮ croes	Trio	D minor	Henri-Jacques de Croes	
159	121	borre D♮	boure	D minor	Unknown	
160	122	Menuet A♯ croes	Menuet alternatif par M croes	A major	Henri-Jacques de Croes	
161	122	Menuet A♮ croes	Trio	A minor	Henri-Jacques de Croes	
162	123	Menuet D♯ belsier	Menuet alternatif par M belsier	D major	Antoon Belsier	
163	123	Menuet D♯ belsier	Trio	D major	Antoon Belsier	
164	124	Menuet A♯ croes	Menuet alternatif par M croes	A major	Henri-Jacques de Croes	
165	124–25	Menuet A♮ croes	Trio	A minor	Henri-Jacques de Croes	
166	125	De Meÿ G	De meÿ	G major	Unknown	
167	126	Marche A♯	Marche	A major	Unknown	
168	126	Menuet A♮	Menuet	A minor	Joannes de Gruytters	At the end, De Gruytters writes: "I D G. 20 aug. 1746."
169	127	Paisande D♮	Paisande	D minor	Unknown	
170	127	Menuet D♮	Menuet	D minor	Unknown	
171	128–29	L'angloise G fiocco	L'Angloise Rondeau	G major	Joseph-Hector Fiocco	
172	130–31	Ceciliana D♮ gruÿtters	Ceciliana	D minor	Joannes de Gruytters	
173	132	Menuet D♯	Menuet	D major	Unknown	
174	132	Menuet D♮	Trio	D minor	Unknown	
175	133	Ceciliene G Couprin	Ceciliene	G major	François Couperin	At the end, De Gruytters writes: "Auth: Couprin. scrip.: 16 7bre 1746 in antverp:"
176	134	Giga D♮ Couprin	Untitled	D minor	François Couperin	
177	134	Giga D♯ Couprin	Suitte	D major	François Couperin	
178	135	Contredans D♮	Contredanse	D minor	Unknown	
179	136–37	Andante A♮ gruÿtters	Andante	A minor	Joannes de Gruytters	
180	138	Menuett G baustetter	Menuet par Mr baustetter	G major	Jan Koenraad Baustetter	
181	138–39	Menuet G♭ baust	Suitte	G minor	Jan Koenraad Baustetter	
182	139	Menuet G gruÿtters	Menuet	G major	Joannes de Gruytters	At the end, De Gruytters writes: "19 7bre 1746. i : d : g :"
183	140–41	Andante C croes	Sonata Andante	C major	Henri-Jacques de Croes	
184	142–43	Allegro C	Allegro	C major	Unknown	
185	144–45	Adagio F Vivaldi	Concerto par Mr Vivaldi	F major	Antonio Vivaldi	
186	146	Adagio D♮ Vivaldi	Largo	D minor	Antonio Vivaldi	
187	148–49	Allegro F Vivaldi	Allegro	F major	Antonio Vivaldi	
188	150	La vandangieuse A♮ Coup:	Le vandangieuse par Couprin	A minor	François Couperin	
189	151	Not listed	Menuet	C major	Unknown	
190	151	Not listed	Suitte	C major	Antoon Belsier	At the end, De Gruytters writes: "auth. belsier. 1745."
191	152	Tantum ergo van La forse	Tantum ergo par La forse	C major	Jacob La Fosse	
192	152	en Hendrick	Tantum ergo par M hendrickx junior	C major	Jan Frans Hendrickx	At the end, De Gruytters writes: "Fecit 1743."
193	153	Maria Schoon	Maria Schoon	C major	Unknown	193 and 194 are combined in the table of contents as "Twee Maria Schoon"
194	154	Maria Schoon	Maria Schoon in sexti toni	F major	Unknown	193 and 194 are combined in the table of contents as "Twee Maria Schoon"

== See also ==
- Notebook for Anna Magdalena Bach
