= Richard Arnold (chronicler) =

English antiquary and historian

Richard Arnold (died c. 1521), was an English antiquary and chronicler.

Arnold was a citizen of London, dwelling in the parish of St Magnus, London Bridge. It would appear from his own book, originally untitled and now generally known as Arnold's Chronicle or The Customs of London, that he was a merchant trading with Flanders. He was an executor of the will of John Amell the elder, citizen and cutler of London, which was drawn up in 1473, and he is there described as a haberdasher. He was in the habit, for purposes of business, of paying visits to Flanders, and was in 1488 confined in the Castle of Sluys on suspicion of being a spy. He was apparently hard pressed by creditors at one period of his life, and sought shelter in the sanctuary at Westminster. He had a wife named Alice and a son Nicholas. The date of his death is uncertain. Francis Douce, who fully investigated the matter, concluded that he died shortly after the publication of the last edition of his book, in 1520–1521.

== Work ==
Arnold's Customs of London is a book dealing with London antiquities. It contains the chief charters granted to the city, accounts of its customs, and notes on a variety of topics chiefly but not entirely connected with commerce. Thomas Hearne called it a chronicle; but its only claim to that title rests on its opening section, which gives, with occasional historical notes, a list of the names of the "Balyfs, Gustos, Mayers, and Sherefs" of London between 1189 and 1502. The greater part of this list was evidently borrowed direct from a manuscript now in the Cottonian Library at the British Museum. Arnold himself gives the book no name; Douce, its latest editor, christens it The Customs of London. Its best known feature is its introduction of the "Ballade of ye Nottebrowne Mayde" ("The Nut-Brown Maid"), which occurs, without any explanation, between an account of the tolls payable by English merchants sending merchandise to Antwerp, and a statement of the differences between English and Flemish currencies. No earlier version of the ballad is known, and according to Capel, Warton, Douce, and Collier, it is probable that it had been composed only a few years before Arnold transcribed and printed it. Hearne, however, assigns it to the time of Henry V, and Thomas Percy to the early part of Henry VII's reign. Its authorship is unknown; but Douce assumes that it was translated from an old German ballad by some Englishman whom Arnold met at Antwerp. It was frequently reprinted separately in the sixteenth century, and enjoyed very great popularity for many years; interest in it was revived by its republication in the Muse's Mercury for June 1707, where it was first seen by Matthew Prior, who paraphrased it in his 'Henry and Emma' about 1718.

From typographical evidence it is clear that Arnold's book was first published at Antwerp in 1502 by John Doesborowe, who published other English books. This edition is without date, place, or printer's name. A second edition, in which the list of the mayors and sheriffs is brought down to 1520—doubtless the date of publication—is ascribed by typographical experts to Peter Treveris, the first printer who set up a press at Southwark. It is also without date, place, or printer's name. A third edition, with introduction by Francis Douce, appeared in 1811. Copies of the two original editions, which are now very rare, are in the British Library, and other copies may be found at the Huntington Library, the Folger Shakespeare Library, and other archives.
