= Henricus Josephus de Lannoy =

Flemish violin maker

Henri-Joseph de Lannoy (also Henricus Josephus de Lannoy; 1712 – c. 1795) was a Flemish luthier and a crafter of string instruments such as violins, violas and cellos. His instruments are recognized as key examples of 18th century violin making in Flanders, characterized by their fine work and golden-yellow varnish.

== Biography ==
Henri-Joseph de Lannoy was born in 1712 in Lille as the son of Charles de Lannoy and Marie Antoinette Bougard, and he grew up in a family deeply involved in the craft of violin making. By the age of 18, he started as an apprentice violin maker in Borgendael, Brussels. After completing his apprenticeship, de Lannoy worked in several cities, including Brussels, Ghent and The Hague. He successively travelled to Rotterdam, Antwerp and Mons, while expanding his knowledge of violin making. From time to time he returned to Brussels, where he finally settled with his brother Jean-Joseph-André de Lannoy in the year 1767.

de Lannoy’s exceptional skill and reputation led him to secure a prestigious position at the Brussels Court. He began working there around 1784 as suggested by a letter he sent to the Finance Council with the aim of taking over the post of the late E. Michiels. In this same letter, he wrote that he had been a luthier for more than 50 years. On the death of Michiels, the renowned Henri-Jacques de Croes highly recommended de Lannoy at the Council of Finance, calling him the "... one and only good worker in this kind of craft I know...". He would be employed by the Court until 1794, becoming the last luthier of the Royal Chapel of the Austrian Netherlands.
