= Joseph Touchemoulin =

French violinist and composer

- Born: 23 October 1727; Chalon-sur-Saône
- Died: 25 October 1801 (aged 74); Regensburg
- Occupations: Violinist; Composer; Conductor

Joseph Touchemoulin (23 October 1727 – 25 October 1801) was a French violinist and composer of the classical period who mainly worked in Bonn and Regensburg.

== Biography ==
Born in Chalon-sur-Saône, Joseph Touchemoulin, the son of the town's oboist Louis Touchemoulin and his wife Jeanne Roulot, had been employed as a violinist at the court of the elector of Cologne of Bavaria in Bonn from a very early age. This enabled him to study in Italy, where he was taught by Giuseppe Tartini who was also the one who inspired Touchemoulin to develop his compositional skills.

He returned to Bonn in 1753, where his salary was augmented by 1,000 fl. in March 1753. One of his symphonies was performed successfully at the Paris Concert Spirituel on 15 August of the following year. On 4 February 1761, he was appointed, contrary to customary practice, as Kapellmeister in Bonn instead of the more senior singer Ludwig van Beethoven the Elder, the grandfather of the composer of the same name. But only two days later the Elector died. The halving of the musician's salaries by his successor Maximilian Friedrich von Königsegg-Rothenfels prompted Touchemoulin to resign and to take up a position at the court of the princes of Thurn und Taxis in Regensburg that same year. Theodor von Schacht was at the time of is appointment the Kapellmeister of the Thurn und Taxis court orchestra. Von Schacht was a decent composer and producer of German and Italian operas as well as an excellent administrator of the Regensburg court orchestra. In this period courts were competing with each other through their support for the arts including court music. Prince Karl Anselm's efforts were successful. The Thurn und Taxis orchestra at Regensburg was ranked as one of the best in German-speaking territories in the late 18th century. Its sole rivals were the Hofkapelle in Mannheim and the orchestra of the Esterházy with Joseph Haydn at its Kapellmeister. Touchemoulin worked first as violinist at the orchestra (as a colleague of František Xaver Pokorný). The Kapellmeister von Schacht was frequently employed on diplomatic missions and as a result the daily management of the orchestra passed in the hands of Touchemoulin. After the retirement or dismissal of Touchemoulin in 1799, the Flemish musician and composer Henri-Joseph de Croes took over the role of the Kapellmeister of the orchestra.

He died in Regensburg on 25 October 1801 where his tombstone is placed in the Saint Emmeram's Abbey.

== Works ==
Touchemoulin composed 18 symphonies and five violin concertos. Only few of his works were printed, and his work was forgotten after his death. Many manuscripts are scattered throughout European and American music libraries. The most extensive collection is held in the Thurn und Taxis Library in Regensburg.

The following works have been assigned to Touchemoulin without a doubt.

- 6 symphonies, Op. 1, Bonn Symphonies (Paris 1754)
  1. Sinfonia in E flat major (Allegro - Andante - Presto)
  2. Sinfonia in G major (Allegro assai - Andante - Presto)
  3. Sinfonia in F major (Allegro - Andante - Presto)
  4. Sinfonia in D major (Allegro assai - Andante - Presto)
  5. Sinfonia in F major (Allegro - Andante - Presto)
  6. Sinfonia in C major (Allegro moderato - Andante - Presto)
- 12 symphonies
- 5 violin concertos (In the foreword of the first two concertos, Op. 2 (1775), he describes himself as "disciple of the famous Tartini".)
- harpsichord concerto
- flute concerto
- Divertimento per la tavola di S. A. S. il Principe della Torre e chassis for 13 instruments
- string quartet
- 4 sonatas for violin and b. c.
- I furori di Orlando, Dramma semigiocoso, Regensburg 1777
- Music for Annette and Lubin (A. Blaise)
- Missa solemnis in G minor for soloists, choir and orchestra
- some smaller instrumental and vocal works

All his operas are lost:

- Annette et Lubin, of which the libretto remains
- Der rasende Roland
- Il vote

CD recordings

- Concertos & Symphonies (Ramée 0807)
- Alexis Kossenko - Flauto traverso, Daniel Sepec - violin, Les inventions, Patrick Ayrton - harpsichord and conductor
- Sinfonia F major op. 1 No. 5 (Allegro-Andante-Presto)
- Sinfonia G major op. 1 No. 2 (Allegro assai-Andante-Presto)
- Violin Concerto in D major (Allegro moderato-Adagio-Presto)
- Flute Concerto in A major (Allegro-Largo-Presto)
- Harpsichord Concerto in C major (Allegro ma non molto-Andantino-Tempo di Menuetto)
- Sonata No. 3 B flat major for violin and basso continuo (Ars Burgundiae AB 001/01)
- Helen Fouchères - Violin; Marion Middenway - Violoncello, Patrick Ayrton - Harpsichord
- The Six Bonn Symphonies op. 1 (University of Bonn 2002)
- Capella academia, Walter L. Mik - Management
- Music at the University of Bonn (University of Bonn 1997)
- Collegium musicum, Walter L. Mik - Management
  - includes: Symphony No. 17 D major (approx. 1790)
- Italian Baroque Concerts (Koch München 1988)
- Paul Meisen - flute, Cologne Chamber Orchestra, Helmut Müller-Brühl - conductor
  - includes: flute concerto A major
- Court music by the Prince of Thurn und Taxis (LP, Polydor International GmbH 1980)

Eberhard Kraus, harpsichord; includes: Chaconne D major
