= Henri-Joseph de Croes =

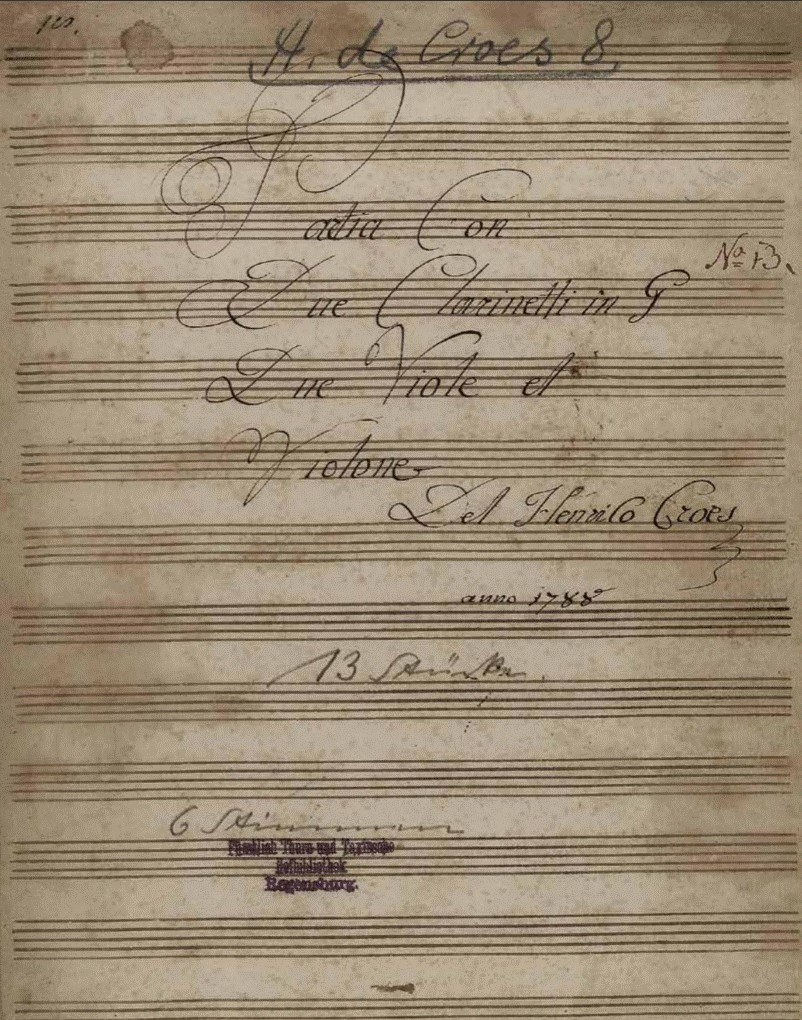
Title page of Partia con due clarinetti in G, due viole et violone, 1788

Henricus Josephus de Croes, Hendrik Jozef de Croes, known as Henri-Joseph de Croes (Brussels, 1748 – Regensburg, 1842) was a Flemish composer and violinist. He was Kapellmeister of the court orchestra of the Thurn und Taxis in Regensburg. He composed symphonies, various clarinet concertos, partitas, divertimenti and a Singspiel or opera.

== Life ==
De Croes was born in Brussels as the son of Henri-Jacques de Croes. His father, originally from Antwerp, was a composer and violinist who had been the Kapellmeister of the Thurn und Taxis family in Frankfurt on Main and had then accepted a similar position at the Royal Chapel of the Prince Charles Alexander of Lorraine, governor of the Austrian Netherlands in Brussels. Henri-Joseph was trained by his father as a violinist and the father and son played together duets composed by the father.

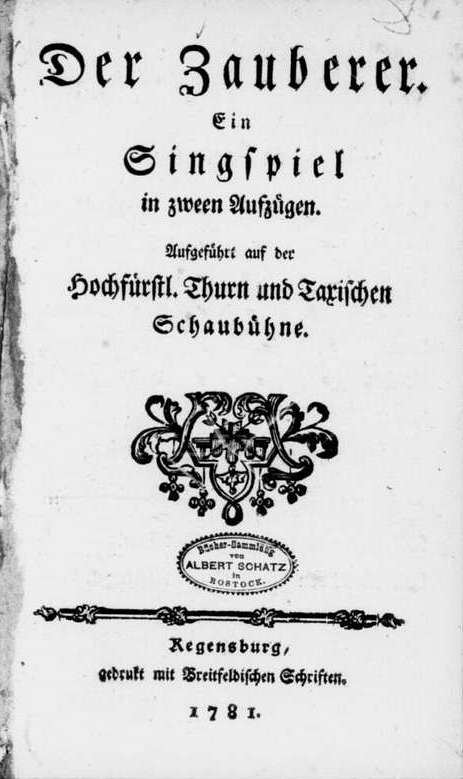
Title page of Der Zauberer

As he could not find a position as a musician in Brussels his father relied on his connections to arrange for him to audition for the Thurn und Taxis orchestra in Regensburg. He was hired in 1776 at a salary of 400 florins. It was Karl Anselm, Prince von Thurn und Taxis, a great lover of music, who engaged him for the orchestra. The hiring of the promising violist de Croes fitted in perfectly with the Prince's aim of building it into a first-rate orchestra. He also collected an extensive musical library. The orchestra's members included some of the leading musicians of the time such as the French viol player Joseph Touchemoulin, the Bohemian violin player Franz Xaver Pokorny, the Italian flautist Fiorante Agustinelli and the Italian oboist Giovanni Palestrini. Theodor von Schacht was at the time of de Croes' appointment the Kapellmeister of the orchestra. Von Schacht was a decent composer and producer of German and Italian operas as well as an excellent administrator of the Regensburg court orchestra. In this period courts were competing with each other through their support for the arts including court music. Prince Karl Anselm's efforts were successful. The Thurn und Taxis orchestra at Regensburg was ranked as one of the best in German-speaking territories in the late 18th century. Its sole rivals were the Hofkapelle in Mannheim and the orchestra of the Esterházy with Joseph Haydn at its Kapellmeister.

When de Croes married the famous opera singer Maria Augusta Houdière, a very sumptuous wedding feast was held. His father had to foot part of the large bill for the wedding. The financial difficulties resulting from this forced his father to sell a large portion of his compositions to Prince Charles Alexander of Lorraine. The Kapellmeister von Schacht was frequently employed on diplomatic missions and as a result the daily management of the orchestra passed in the hands of Touchemoulin. After the retirement or dismissal of Touchemoulin in 1799, de Croes took over the role of the Kapellmeister of the orchestra. The court orchestra was disbanded on 31 October 1806 as a result of the combined effects of the death of Prince Karl Anselm, the dissolution of the Holy Roman Empire and the Napoleonic Wars. De Croes experienced personal tragedy as two of his children died, a tragedy which was followed in 1806 by the death of his wife. He remained in Regensburg but is not believed to have no longer composed much.

He died in 1842 in Regensburg.

== Music ==
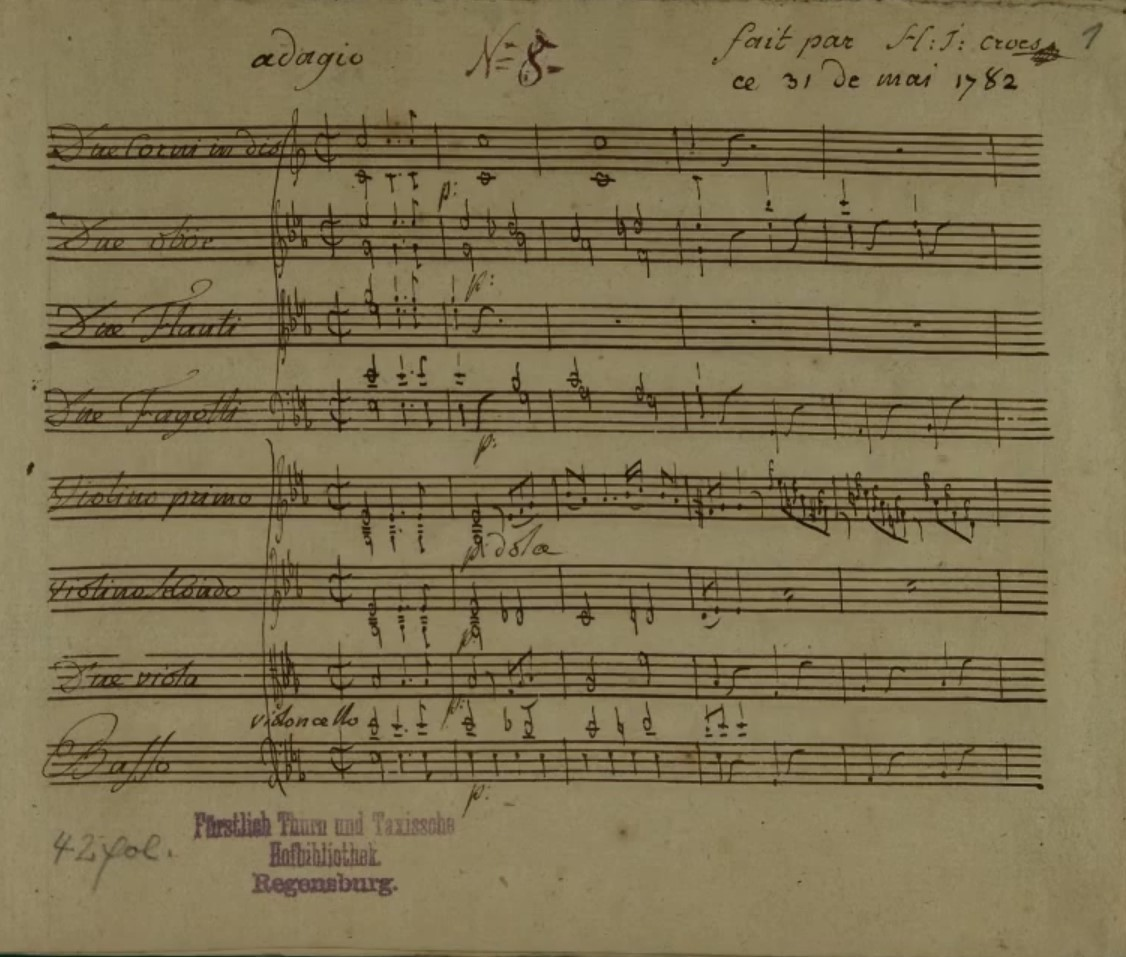
First page of Symphony No 1, 1782

De Croes wrote many compositions for courtly use such as divertimenti and partitas as well as two symphomies and a two-act opera or Singspiel entitled Der Zauberer (The Magician). The latter was performed in 1781 at the Ballhaus Theater in Regensburg. Most of the manuscripts of his compositions are preserved in the Thurn und Taxis library in Regensburg. He may have written compositions that are not kept in that library.

His two known symphonies were written two decades apart, respectively at the start of his career in 1782 and at the height of his career in 1800. The first symphony shows the influence of the Late Mannheimer Style, and in particular the symphonic style of Christian Cannabich. He adopted its model of starting with a slow introduction in the first part and then moving into an energetic allegro molto. The two middle sections are in the galant style and are followed by an impressive finale in which de Croes used his own formula involving an up-beat in the second theme. His second symphony, written around 1800, again opens with a slow introduction, this time in the minor, immediately followed by an energetic allegro in the style of Cannabich. The second movement deviates from the Mannheimer formula and allows the various soloist parts ample opportunity to create a rich palette of colors. The symphony concludes with a tarantella and an alla caccia on the horn, which is reminiscent of the symphonies of Joseph Haydn. Both symphonies are written in a galant style and display originality and a Romantic emotionality.

In his partitas de Croes uses the middle voices, in particular the violas, to create a dark, sensitive sound. He wrote a few pieces for an instrument that is currently no longer used in concert practice, the clarinet d'amore. He also wrote a solo concerto for bassoon, adding to the quite limited repertoire for this instrument.

== Selected discography ==
- Henri Joseph De Croes, Concerto For Clarinet & Partias, Vlad Weverbergh (director), South-west German Chamber Orchestra Pforzheim*, Sebastian Tewinkel, Aliud, 2010
- Henri Joseph De Croes, Divertimenti, Vlad Weverbergh (director), Terra Nova Collective, Vlad Records, 2012
- Henri Joseph De Croes, The Return of the Clarinetto D'amore, Vlad Weverbergh (director), Terra Nova Collective, Et'cetera, 2019
- Henri-Joseph de Croes, Symphonies and Concertos, Vlad Weverbergh (director), Terra Nova Collective, Et'cetera, 2019
