= The New-Slain Knight =

Traditional song

The New-Slain Knight (Roud 3887, Child 263) is an English-language folk song.

== Synopsis ==
A man tells a woman that he has seen a knight murdered outside her father's garden. She insists on a description and laments that she has no father for her baby. He offers to take her love's place, and she refuses. He pulls off his disguise and reveals himself as her love, and assures him that now he knows her love is true.

== See also ==
- The Bailiff's Daughter of Islington
- The Nut-Brown Maid
