= Jon Rennard =

English singer and songwriter

Jon Rennard (1946 — 29 July 1971) was an English folksinger who recorded two record albums of traditional material as well as his own songs.

== Biography ==
Born in 1946, Jon Rennard was a folksinger based in Leeds, Yorkshire. Rennard was appreciated as a singer in folk clubs. He died at the age of 24 on 29 July 1971 in a car accident in Leeds. He left a wife Pat and a son John.

== Brimbledon Fair ==
Brimbledon Fair, recorded in 1970, is Jon Rennard's debut album.

Track listing:

1. "Brimbledon Fair
2. "The Eigerwand" (Rennard)
3. "I Live Not Where I Love" (traditional)
4. "Regency" (Rennard)
5. "Ballad of Joseph Myers" (Rennard)
6. "Go From My Window" (traditional)
7. "Broom Besoms"
8. "The Sheffield Apprentice"
9. "Chicken Fat"
10. "The Bailiff's Daughter of Islington" (traditional)
11. "The Old Man's Lament" (traditional)
12. "Lullaby" (Rennard)

One of the tracks on that album is "The Bailiff's Daughter of Islington", Child ballad number 105. Rennard offers traditional rendering of traditional material, deftly sung and played on an acoustic guitar. Beside the title song, other traditional songs include "Broom Besoms", "Go From My Window", "I Live Not Where I Love", and "The Sheffield Apprentice", the latter two sung unaccompanied. There is also "The Old Man's Lament", adapted by Ian Campbell from the traditional Scottish ditty, "Nicky Tams", and his own compositions: "The Ballad of Joseph Myers" about a public hanging in 1864, "The Eigerwand" about a failed attempt to climb the Eiger mountain, "Lullaby", and "Regency", the latter an instrumental piece on guitar.

== The Parting Glass ==
Rennard's second album was entitled The Parting Glass, produced by Traditional Sound Recordings in Macclesfield, England, based on live recordings at the Bate Hall Folk Club in Macclesfield, in November 1970. The album appeared in 1971 after his death. Traditional songs in that album include "The Parting Glass", "Holmfirth Anthem", "Banks of Sweet Primroses", "Garners Gay", "The Captain's Apprentice", "The Female Drummer Boy", and "Follow the Plough". In addition, there is "In Your Smile", a love song of his, "Gay Sailor Jack McKoy", a satire of his, and "Jumbo the Elephant", composed by Leon Rosselson, about an animal breaking loose from bondage.

== Reissue ==
Fellside Records reissued both of Rennard's albums in April 2015 as digital downloads, making them available to the public for the first time since 1971.
