= The West Country Damosel's Complaint =

Traditional song

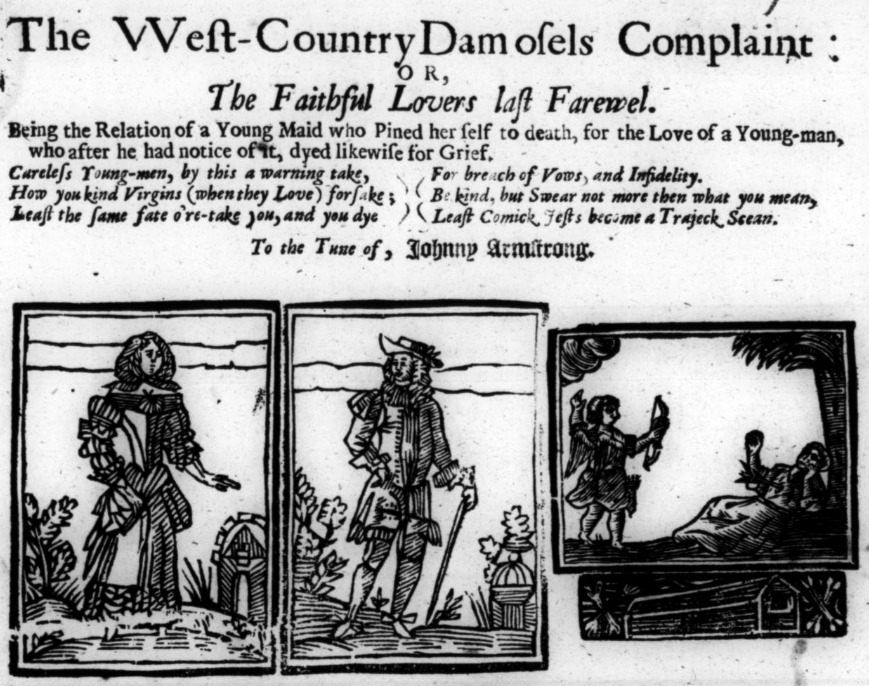
- An image of a lyric sheet dated back to c. 1680
- Native name: The Weft-Country Damofels Complaint
- Catalogue: Child 292
- Language: Scottish English, Middle English
- Melody: Johnny Armstrong

The West Country Damosel's Complaint is a traditional English or Scottish ballad that is part of the Child Ballad anthology (number 292).

== Synopsis ==
The young girl tell her lover William to marry her or kill her with his sword. William tells the girl to come live with him and enjoy life in the forest.

The girl spends three months in the forest with William, but grows tired of the privation and leaves him. The girl goes back to her sister's house for food. Standing at the gates, she begs for food, acknowledging that she has no pride. In response, the sister orders her huntsmen to track down and kill the "wild doe". After evading the huntsman during a long difficult chase, the heartbroken girl finally lies down on two stones in the forest and dies.

William find the dead girl. He laments her death and his leaving her alone. William expresses regret that her love for him prompted her to leave her comfortable home. He also expresses remorse that the girl was the object of the sister's anger, which should have been directed at him alone.

William decides that he should die also so that they can be married in death. With a heartrending groan, he lies down next to her to die. The robins then bury the two lovers in leaves.

== See also ==
- List of the Child Ballads
- The Nut-Brown Maid
