= The Bailiff's Daughter of Islington =

English traditional song

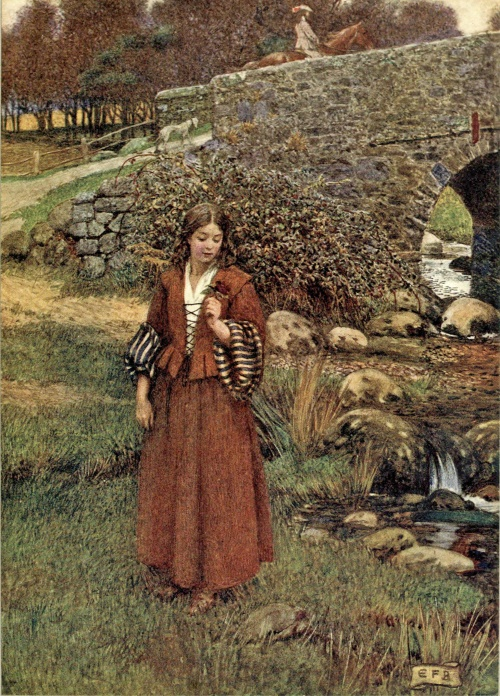
The bailiff's daughter of Islington illustrated by Eleanor Fortescue-Brickdale in The Book of Old English Songs and Ballads (1915)

The Bailiff's Daughter of Islington or True Love Requited is a traditional English folk song and broadside ballad. It is numbered as Child ballad 105, and as Roud number 483. It tells the story of a young couple from Islington who are separated by a seven-year apprenticeship, only to encounter each other once more along the road to London and live happily ever after. Copies of the broadside can be found in the British Library, the National Library of Scotland, and Magdalene College, Cambridge. Facsimile transcriptions are also available on-line for public consumption.

== Synopsis ==
The ballad concerns a young squire's son who falls in love with a bailiff's daughter from Islington, to the north of London. This is considered to be an unsuitable pairing, so his family dispatches him to the City. There a seven-year apprenticeship affords him worldly success, although servitude sharpens his ardour for the maiden he once knew.

The bailiff's family falls on hard times. The daughter survives, but attempts to run away from Islington to London, when on the road she encounters the squire's son.

She begs he give her a penny to partially deal with her financial issues. In reply, he asks: "Before I give you a penny, sweetheart. / Pray tell me where you were born."; and, when the bailiff's daughter says she was born in Islington, “Then tell me if you know / The bailiff’s daughter of that place.”

"She died sir, long ago", the girl asserts sorrowfully. The youth is heartbroken and offhandedly pledges the girl his horse and tack, for he feels like nothing but departing into exile. She cries: "O, stay, o, stay, thou goodly youth. / She standeth by thy side; / She’s here alive, she is not dead. / And ready to be thy bride."

The squire's son is overjoyed by this news and they are quickly married.

== First editions ==
The earliest known text was published (as a broadside) by Phillip Brooksby between 1683 and 1696. The tune dates from 1731 (ballad opera, The Jovial Crew).

== Recordings ==
- Hermes Nye on Anglo-American Ballads (1952)
- Richard Dyer-Bennet on Dyer-Bennett Vol. 2 (1956)
- Tony Wales on Sussex Folk Songs and Ballads (1957)
- Paul Clayton on Folk Ballads of the English Speaking World (1956)
- Dusky Ruthe recorded it as a single (1970)
- Jon Rennard on Brimbledon Fair (1970)
- Tania Opland and Mike Freeman on Choice Fare (2000)
- Owen Brannigan and Elizabeth Harwood on Heart of Oak: Songs and Folksongs of the British Isles (2004)
- Tanya Brody on Not Your Average...Anything (2004)
- Laura Cortese on Hush (2004)
- Bob Lewis on Drive Sorrows Away (Live, 2008)
- Jim and Mindy on Music For Relaxation Featuring the Recorder (2012)

The recording by Brannigan and Harwood was widely celebrated. It found considerable success in Japan.

== Lines ==
There was a youth, a well beloved youth,
And he was the squire’s son;
He loved the bailiff’s daughter dear
That lived in Islington.

But she was coy and never would
On him her heart bestow,
Till he was sent to London town
Because he loved her so.

When seven long years had passed away,
She put on man attire,
And straight to London she did go
About him to enquire.

And as she walked along the load,
The weather hot and dry,
She rested on a grassy bank
And her love came riding by.

“Give me a penny, thou goodly youth,
Relieve a maid forlorn.”
“Before I give you a penny, sweetheart.
Pray tell me where you were born.”

“O, I was born at Islington.”
“Then tell me if you know
The bailiff’s daughter of that place.”
“She died, sir, long ago.”

“If she be dead, then take my horse,
My saddle and bridle so,
And I’ll go to some foreign land.
Where no man shall me know.”

“O, stay, o, stay, thou goodly youth.
She standeth by thy side;
She’s here alive, she is not dead.
And ready to be thy bride.”

== See also ==
- The New-Slain Knight
- The Nut-Brown Maid
