= The Cooper =

Comic opera by Thomas Arne

- Comic opera by Thomas Arne
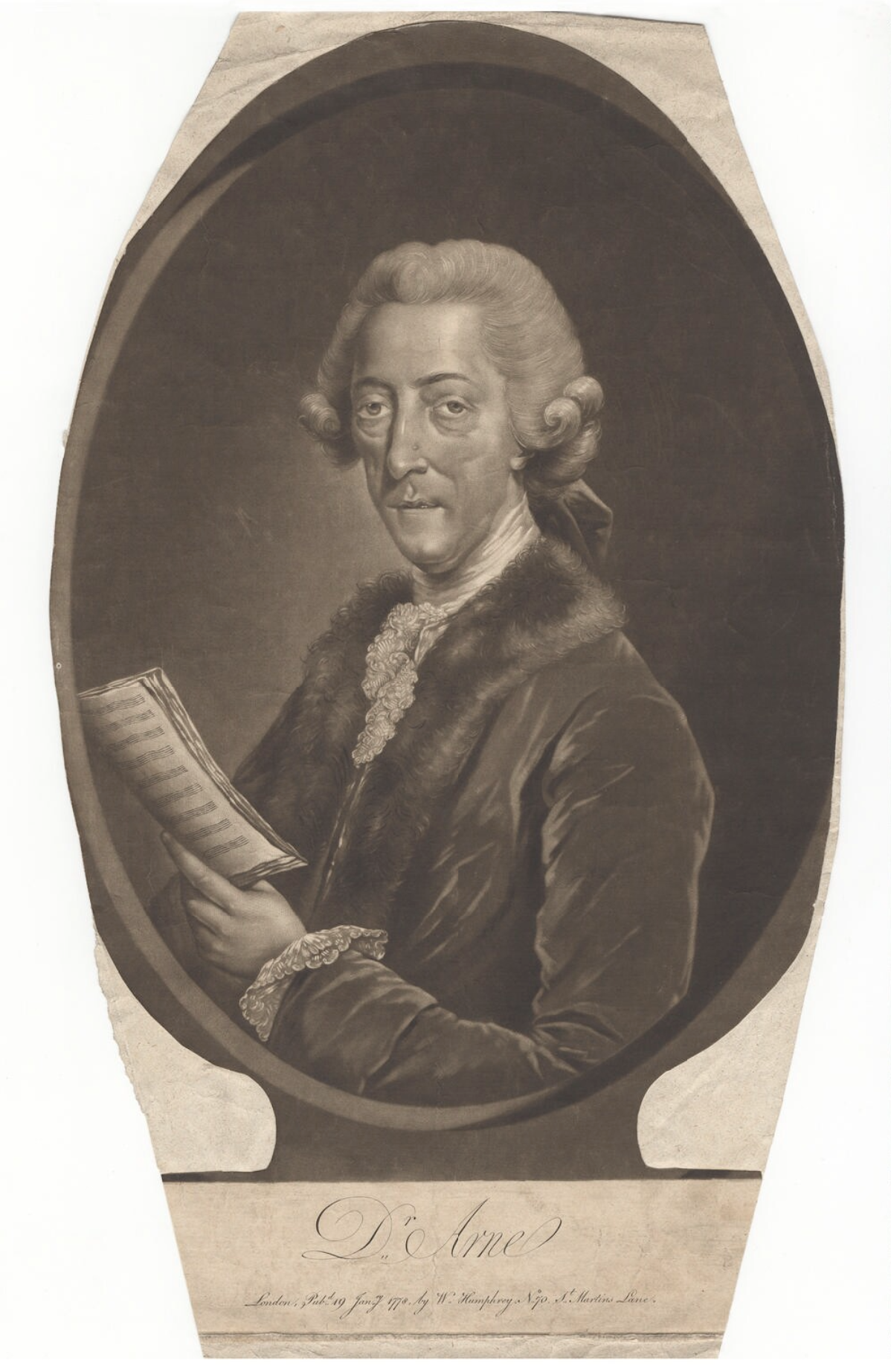
- 1778 portrait of Arne
- Librettist: Arne
- Based on: Le tonnelier
- Premiere: 10 June 1772; Theatre Royal, Haymarket

The Cooper is a comic opera in two acts by Thomas Arne. The English libretto by Arne is based on Nicolas-Médard Audinot and Antoine François Quétant’s Le tonnelier. The opera premiered in London at the Theatre Royal in the Haymarket on 10 June 1772.

== Musical analysis and history ==
The Cooper has simple lyrical style that is reminiscent of the works of Charles Dibdin. The vocal lines are melodic and easy, refraining from using any complicated coloratura. The music is often cleverly arranged to complement the humour of the text. For example, Fanny’s recitative "He's gone to bed", is accompanied by crotchets marked "Play to the steps of her feet". A modest success, The Cooper ran for nine performances in 1772, and a vocal score was published by Napier that year.

== Roles ==
Cast	Voice type	Premiere, 10 June 1772 (Conductor: - Thomas Arne )
Fanny	soprano	
Martin	baritone	
Colin	tenor	
Jarvis	bass	

== Synopsis ==
Martin, an elderly cooper, is in love with Fanny, his ward. Fanny, however, is in love with Martin's assistant, Colin. The old cooper searches for a reason to fire Colin but the young man outwits his employer with the help of his uncle Jarvis, to whom Martin owes considerable amount of money. Colin and Fanny meet secretly at night but their assignation is interrupted by Martin, who is frightened by the sight of a barrel (Colin's hiding place) apparently coming to life. The arrival of Jarvis, who demands repayment, forces Martin to allow his ward to marry Colin.
