= Wexford Wells =

1720 play

- Original language: English
- Written by: Matthew Concanen
- Genre: Comedy

Premiere
- Date: 7 November 1720
- Place: Smock Alley Theatre, Dublin

Wexford Wells is a 1720 comedy play by the Irish writer Matthew Concanen.

It was performed at the Smock Alley Theatre in Dublin.

== Bibliography ==
- Baines, Paul & Ferarro, Julian & Rogers, Pat. The Wiley-Blackwell Encyclopedia of Eighteenth-Century Writers and Writing, 1660-1789. Wiley-Blackwell, 2011.
- Greene, John C. & Clark, Gladys L. H. The Dublin Stage, 1720-1745: A Calendar of Plays, Entertainments, and Afterpiece. Lehigh University Press, 1993.
