= Eliza (Arne) =

Opera by Thomas Arne

- Opera by Thomas Arne
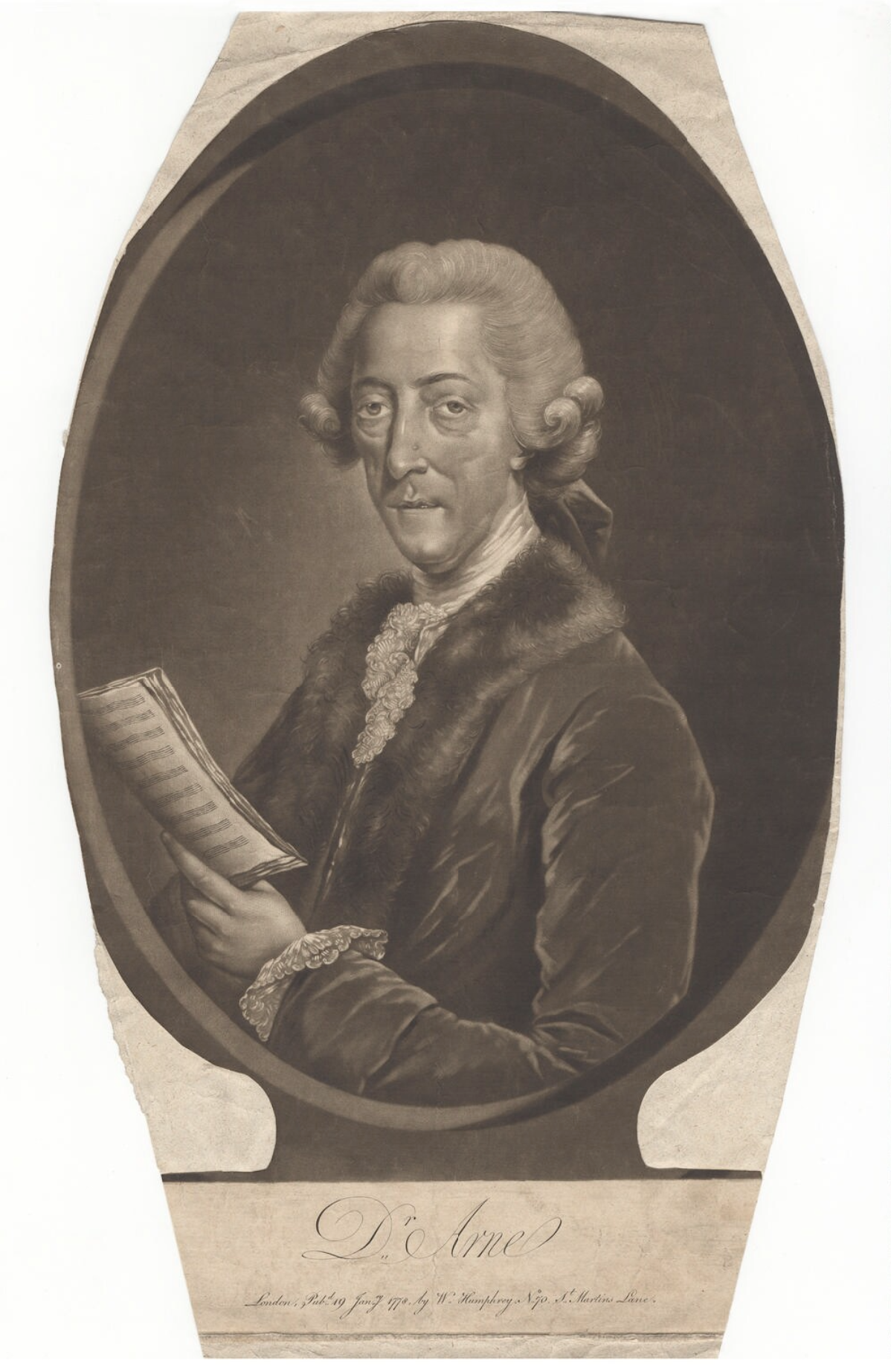
- 1778 portrait of Arne
- Librettist: Richard Rolt
- Premiere: 29 May 1754; New Theatre, Haymarket

Eliza is an opera in three acts by the composer Thomas Arne to an English libretto by Richard Rolt. The opera was premiered in London at the New Theatre in the Haymarket on 29 May 1754.

== History and music analysis ==
The opera is named for Queen Elizabeth I of England, although she does not actually appear as an onstage character. Although Eliza is highly patriotic in nature, the monarchy did not take kindly to the work and the opera was suppressed after one performance "by an Order from a superior Power". The opera was later more successfully revived at the Smock Alley Theatre in Dublin in 1755 and at the Theatre Royal, Drury Lane in December 1756.

Eliza was published in 1758 but without the recitatives or choruses. However, the original score for Acts 2 and 3 has survived with only some of the music from Act 1 being lost. Stylistically, the opera is closer to that of Italian baroque opera than the pre-classical works being written around the same time; additionally, it has some relationship to the masque or allegory. Arne's orchestration is quite progressive for its day, using strings, bassoons, oboes, trumpets, horns and drums; it also includes obbligato parts for piccolo, flute, descant recorder and cello. The overture suggests the style of Handel.

== Roles ==
Role	Voice type	Premiere cast, 29 May 1754 (Conductor: - Thomas Arne)
Britannia	soprano	Cecilia Young (Mrs Arne)
Liberty	soprano	Miss Scott
Peace	soprano	Isabella Young (Miss Isabella Scott)
Genius of England	tenor	Miss Poitier
Neptune	bass	Mr Champness

== Synopsis ==
The setting is 1588. Britannia, in an attitude of dejection, is alone on stage, dreading the approaching military might of Spain. Various friendly beings, including the "Genius of England", Peace, Liberty, Neptune, and various shepherds and shepherdesses, attempt to invigorate her; eventually her morale improves sufficiently that the group can defend their nation from the approaching Spanish Armada. A war march precedes the climactic battle at sea. After the successful battle, the Genius of England sings the aria "We have fought, we have conquer'd", and the entire ensemble welcomes peace in the finale "Hail glory, like the morning star."
