= The Nut-Brown Maid =

Song

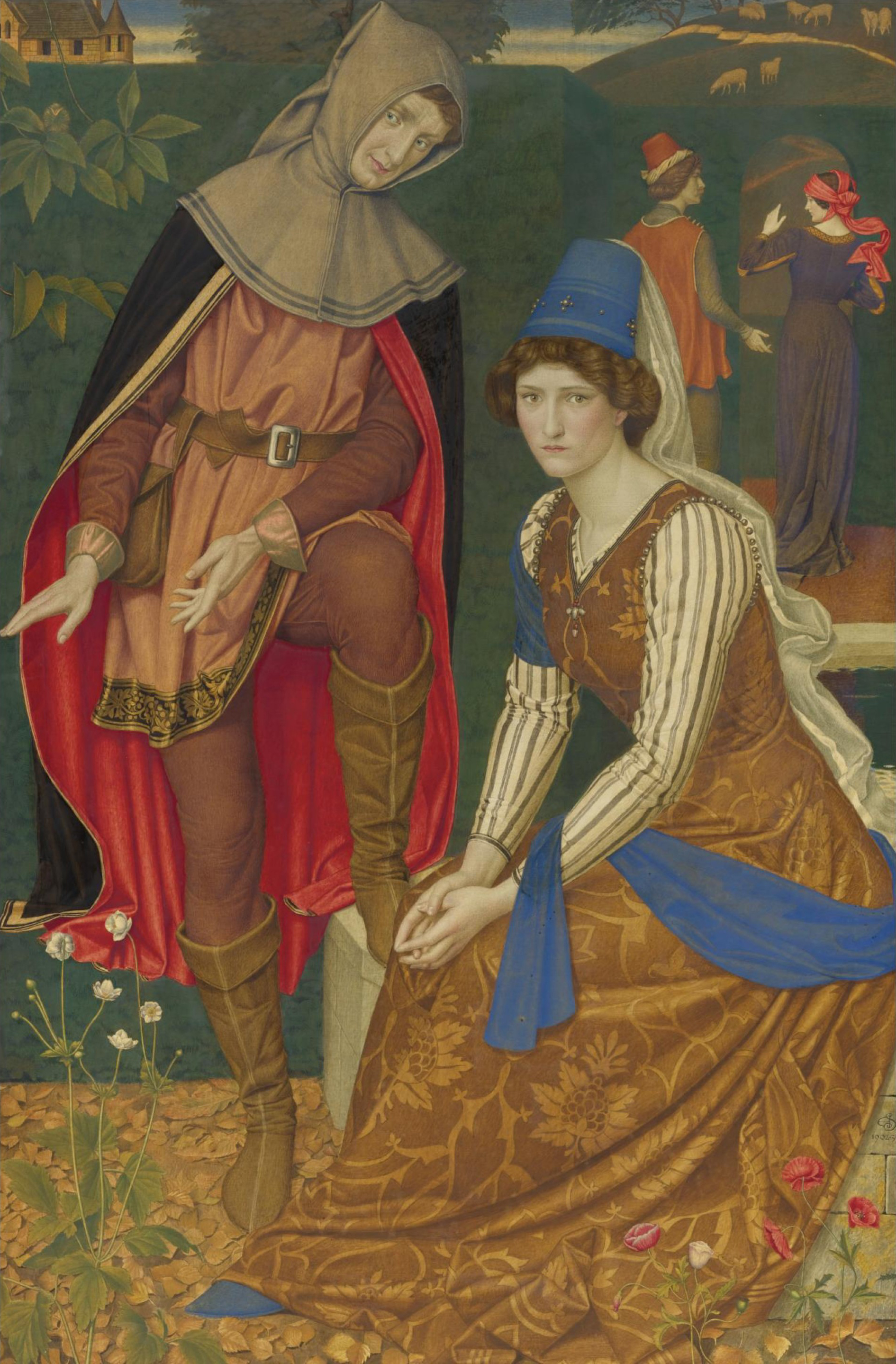
Joseph Edward Southall - The Nut Brown Maid

"The Nut-Brown Maid" is a ballad that made its first printed appearance in The Customs of London, also known as Arnold's Chronicle, published in 1502 by the chronicler Richard Arnold. The editor of the 1811 edition of the chronicle suggested it might be based on a German ballad. An alternative explanation is that the poem may be based on the exploits of Henry Clifford (1454-1523), the tenth Baron Clifford, and his wife Anne St John. Like the knight in the ballad, Clifford was said to have spent part of his early life as an outlaw.

The literary scholar, Walter Skeat suggested the ballad was "almost certainly written by a woman" based on internal references and the poem's vigorous defence of the constancy of women. John Milton Berdan, described the ballad as the 'epitome of Medieval Latin influence'. The poem must have been popular in the early sixteenth century, since there are references to it being sold separately by 1520 for one penny. In 1537 John Scott published a religious song called 'The New Nut Brown Maid' which employed the same phraseology and the same stanza form of the original, in which the dialogue is now between the Virgin and Christ. This presumably represented an attempt to utilise a popular piece for pious purposes. The Nut-Brown Maid was apparently still popular enough in 1575 to have been performed for Queen Elizabeth at Kenilworth Castle in a show put on by the Queen's favourite, Robert Dudley.

After falling into obscurity during the Stuart Period, 'The Nut-Brown Maid' became better known again in the eighteenth century and was reprinted many times. The earliest version was that published in the 'Muse's Mercury' for June 1707. Later versions included one by Thomas Percy in his popular and influential Reliques of Ancient English Poetry (1765). Another widely-published version was that by the renowned nineteenth-century literary scholar William Hazlitt. Later versions of the text employ more modern spelling and orthography.

== Synopsis ==
A man and woman talk of women's fidelity, he disbelieving, and she producing the nut-brown maid as proof. They discuss her story. Her love comes to her, a knight but banished as an outlaw. She tells him that she loves him alone. He tells her that he must go to the greenwood, and she says that it grieves her. He asks if she would not find time easing her and urges her to let it, and she declares that she would go with him to the woods. He warns her that men will slander her for it, that she will have to take a bow as if a man, that if he is caught and executed, no one will help her, that the way will be hard, in the wild and exposed to weather, that meals will be scarce and beds non-existent, that she will have to disguise herself as a man, that he believes she will give it up quickly, that being a baron's daughter and he a lowly squire, she will come to curse him for this, and that he might fall in love with another woman, but to each one, she retorts that she will still come, because she loves him alone.

He tells her that he is not, after all, banished, and she says she is glad but knows that men are fickle. The man assures her that he will marry her, and that he is, in fact, an Earl's son from Westmorland.

== Legacy ==
Matthew Prior's 1709 poem Henry and Emma, a poem, upon the model of The Nut-brown Maid. The enormous popularity of Prior's poem in the eighteenth-nineteenth centuries stimulated interest in "The Nut-Brown Maid", on which it was based.

Francis Cotes's print, Anne Sandby as "The Nut-Brown Maid" (1763) features Anne (wife of Paul Sandby) posing as Emma from Matthew Prior's version of the poem.

Ursula March is referred to several times, in Dinah Mulock Craik's John Halifax, Gentleman (1856), as the "Nut-browne Mayde," highlighting her status as a faithful woman who marries beneath her station.

Joseph Edward Southall's painting 'The Nut Brown Maid' (1902-4) depicts the ballad.

Philip Lindsay, The Nutbrown Maid (London, 1939). A novel combining the ballad with the story lines of some of the Robin Hood ballads.

The 1944 novel Brendon Chase by Denys Watkins-Pitchford, writing as 'BB'. opens with an excerpt from the ballad.

The final poem of John Ashbery's 1977 collection Houseboat Days is 'Fantasia on "The Nut-Brown Maid"'.

== See also ==
- The New-Slain Knight
- The Bailiff's Daughter of Islington
- The West Country Damosel's Complaint
