= Matthew Concanen =

Irish writer, poet, and lawyer (1701-1749

Matthew Concanen (1701 – 22 January 1749) was an Irish writer, poet and lawyer.

== Life ==
Concanen studied law in Ireland but travelled to London as a young man, and began writing political pamphlets in support of the Whig government. He also wrote for newspapers including the London Journal and The Speculatist. He published a volume of poems, some of which were original works and some translations. He wrote a dramatic comedy, Wexford Wells, staged at Dublin's Smock Alley Theatre. A collection of his essays from The Speculatist was published in 1732.

His skills attracted the attention of the Whig statesman Thomas Pelham-Holles, 1st Duke of Newcastle. In June 1732 the Duke appointed him attorney-general of Jamaica. He held the post for over sixteen years. While in Jamaica, he married the daughter of a local planter. After his tenure in Jamaica was completed, he sailed back to London, intending to retire to Ireland, but died of a fever in London shortly after his return.

He criticized Alexander Pope and was rewarded with a passage in Pope's Dunciad ridiculing him as "A cold, long-winded native of the deep" (Dunciad, ii. 299–304). There is also well-known letter about him written by William Warburton, who comments on how Concanen helped him.

== An Essay Against Too Much Reading ==
The 1728 humorous anonymous pamphlet, An Essay Against Too Much Reading, has been attributed to Concanen, though it has also been identified (probably wrongly) as the work of a certain "Captain Goulding" (Thomas Goulding) of Bath. It included the first, though none too serious, direct statements of doubt about Shakespeare's authorship.

The author proposed "a short account of Mr Shakespeare's proceeding, and that I had from one of his intimate acquaintance..." Shakespeare is described as merely a collaborator who "in all probability cou'd not write English." With regard the Bard's grasp of history, the Essay related that Shakespeare "not being a scholar" employed a "chuckle-pated historian" who gave him a set of notes to save the trouble of research. The historian also corrected his grammar.

== Writings ==
In 1731 Concanen, Edward Roome, & Sir William Yonge produced The Jovial Crew, an opera, adapted from Richard Brome's A Jovial Crew.

His publications included

- Wexford Wells (1719)
- Meliora's Tears for Thyrsis (1720)
- A Match at Football (1720)
- Poems on Several Occasions (1722)
- Miscellaneous Poems (1724)
- Miscellaneous Poems and Translations (1726)
- A Supplement to the Profound (1728)
- The Speculatist (1730)
- A Miscellany on Taste (1732)
- Review of the Excise Scheme (1733).

He was co-author of The history and antiquities of the parish of St. Saviour's, Southwark.
