= A Jovial Crew =

Play written by Richard Brome

A Jovial Crew, or the Merry Beggars is a Caroline era stage play, a comedy written by Richard Brome. First staged in 1641 or 1642 and first published in 1652, it is generally ranked as one of Brome's best plays, and one of the best comedies of the Caroline period; in one critic's view, Brome's The Antipodes and A Jovial Crew "outrank all but the best of Jonson."

== Publication ==
The play was first published in 1652, in a quarto printed by James Young for the booksellers Edward Dod and Nathaniel Ekins. The volume contains Brome's dedication of the play to Thomas Stanley. The quarto also features prefatory verses composed by James Shirley, John Tatham, and Alexander Brome among others. The play was Brome's most popular work during its own historical era, and was reprinted in 1661 (by bookseller Henry Brome), 1684 (by Joseph Hindmarsh), and 1708 (C. Brome).

== Performance ==
The title page of the first edition states that the play debuted at the Cockpit Theatre in Drury Lane in 1641. That theatre had recently returned to the management of Brome's friend and colleague William Beeston, after a period under the control of their rival Sir William Davenant. In his dedication to Stanley in the 1652 quarto, Brome states that A Jovial Crew "had the luck to tumble last of all in the epidemical ruin of the scene" — which has been interpreted to mean that the play was the last work acted before the Puritan authorities closed the London theatres on 2 September 1642, at the start of the English Civil War.

The play was revived early in the Restoration era, and proved an enduring favourite with its audience. Samuel Pepys recorded seeing multiple performances of the play in his Diary – twice in 1661, and again in 1662 and in 1669. The play remained in the active repertory when the King's Company and the Duke's Company joined to form the United Company in 1695. The publication of the play's fourth edition in 1708 was motivated by a revival at Theatre Royal, Drury Lane that year.

In what may be a case of mutual influence, John Gay might have drawn upon A Jovial Crew when he created his Beggar's Opera in 1728. In turn, the great success of Gay's work may have inspired the adaptation of A Jovial Crew into a similar ballad opera (comparable to a modern musical): in 1731, Matthew Concanen, Edward Roome, and Sir William Yonge produced their adaptation, The Jovial Crew. In this musical form, the work remained a staple of the English stage for the next half-century, and was performed as late as 1791.

The play was staged by the Royal Shakespeare Company in the Swan Theatre at Stratford-upon-Avon in 1992, in a modern adaptation by playwright Stephen Jeffries.

== Genre ==
A Jovial Crew partakes of a long-standing tradition of "green world comedy" in English Renaissance theatre, which employed a retreat from society into nature to reflect back upon the social world. Pastoral was a prior form of such drama, though as the seventeenth century wore on, pastoral came to seem an ever-more dated form; and the alternative of plays on gypsies and "merry beggars" began to fill its place. The Beaumont and Fletcher play Beggars' Bush (c. 1612–13?; revised by Massinger c. 1622) was a key development in this direction. Ben Jonson's 1621, masque The Gypsies Metamorphosed is also worth noting, since Brome was a self-styled follower of Jonson. Several works in the canon of Thomas Dekker and his collaborators, notably The Spanish Gypsy, belong in the same category. Indeed, Brome's play is only one item in a literature on beggars and their habits and music that grew throughout the century, from Samuel Rowlands' Slang Beggars' Songs (1610) to Daniel Defoe's The Complete Mendicant (1699).

Brome's contribution to this literature has attracted the attention of specialist scholars, for its songs and for its preservation of the particular linguistic forms of the Caroline underclass.

== Synopsis ==
The play's opening scene introduces Oldrents and Hearty, two rural gentlemen and landowners. Oldrents is a generous and warmhearted countryman, who represents the best of the traditional order of England; but he is depressed and pre-occupied with a fortune-teller's prediction, that his two daughters will become beggars. Hearty, a younger and temperamentally more phlegmatic man, works to cheer up his neighbour, and Oldrents tries to adopt a lighter demeanor. Oldrent's steward Springlove enters, to present the bookkeeping accounts and the keys of the estate, and to request leave to follow the beggars about the countryside for the spring and summer. Oldrents is unhappy about this: he wants his young steward to behave more conventionally, more like a gentleman — and offers to furnish him with funds and a servant ("Take horse, and man, and money") for respectable travelling. Yet Springlove rebels at this conventionality. The bird calls of the nightingale and cuckoo call him to vagabondage. (The play's stage directions repeatedly refer to summer birdsong.) As Oldrent's steward, Springlove has been a friend to the local beggars, feeding them generously and furnishing their needs; and once he joins them it turns out that he is something of a leader among them.

Oldrents' daughters Rachel and Meriel are shown with their childhood sweethearts and suitors Vincent and Hilliard. The two young women deplore their father's depressed mood, and the staid order of their lives; they long for "liberty." Vincent proposes "a fling to London" to take in the races at Hyde Park, "and see the Adamites run naked afore the Ladies" — but the young women are determined to go in the opposite direction, and join the "stark, errant, downright beggars." They challenge their suitors to join them, and the young men can hardly refuse; they link up with Springlove's band, and enjoy his protection and guidance. It is their "birthright into a new world."

Their initial efforts at the vagabond life are uneven, however; sleeping rough in the straw of a barn is less comfortable than a bed at home. When they try to beg, they employ the elaborate and courtly language they're used to, and ask for ridiculous sums, 5 or 10 or 20 pounds. Yet they persist with the beggars, and the play shows Springlove and his companions in their activities and celebrations. Oldrents is distressed to find that his daughters have left home; but Hearty prevails upon him to persist in his efforts to be cheerful.

The plot thickens with the introduction of Amie and Martin. Amie has fled from the home of her uncle and guardian, Justice Clack, to avoid an arranged marriage with the ridiculous Talboy; she is escorted by the justice's clerk Martin, Hearty's nephew. They have disguised themselves in the clothing of the common people, and travelled toward Hearty's country estate – though they are pursued by Clack's son Oliver and by beadles and other officers. Martin wants to marry Amie himself, though she sours on the idea as she travels with him and learns more of his character. Once Amie meets Springlove, she quickly falls in love with him. Oliver, chasing Amie, meets Rachel and Meriel; he is attracted to them, and propositions them. He also gets into a disagreement with Vincent and Hilliard, which threatens to lead them to the "field of honour" and a duel.

Oliver visits the estate of Oldrents, and makes him aware of the pursuit of Amie – thereby drawing Oldrents and Hearty into the matter. The pursuing authorities round up many of the beggars and take them into custody, bringing them to Justice Clack. Oldrents and Hearty arrive at Clack's home; the beggars arrange to stage a play for the gentlemen. (As with his earlier The Antipodes, Brome incorporates the metatheatrical device of a play within a play into A Jovial Crew. Brome exploits the traditional equation of "strolling players" with vagabonds, by letting his vagabonds function as actors.) Oldrents is offered a choice of plays, with titles like The Two Lost Daughters, and The Vagrant Steward, and The Beggar's Prophecy. The old man recognises all of them as versions of his own life, and rejects them, as "a story that I know too well. I'll see none of them." He finally settles on The Merry Beggars — but that too proves to be a version of his tale.

The beggars' playlet reveals that Oldrents' grandfather had taken advantage of a neighbour named Wrought-on, acquiring his land and reducing the man the beggary. The Patrico, the leader of the beggars, turns out to be the grandson of that Wrought-on; he is also the fortune-teller who had given Oldrents the original forecast of his daughters' beggary. And the Patrico also explains Oldrents' strangely strong affection for Springlove: the young beggar/steward is Oldrents' illegitimate son, born of a beggar-woman who was Patrico's sister. The family linkage allows the play's reconciliation: Oldrents embraces his son, and restores Wrought-on's property. Rachel and Meriel are ready to leave vagabondage and settle down with Vincent and Hilliard, as Springlove is with Amie. (Martin and Talboy have to reconcile themselves to continued bachelorhood, at least for the present; Hearty assures his nephew Martin that he'll help him find a wife. And the young people agree with Oliver to forget about the potential duel, and about the fact that Oliver propositioned the two Oldrents daughters for twelvepence apiece.) The play's complications yield to a happy ending.

== Relevance ==
While Brome's A Jovial Crew had links with the theatre and literature of its period, the play also drew upon actual events and the social realities of its era. The tumultuous years leading up to the start of the Civil War saw some significant economic dislocations; local authorities in England complained of "the great number of rogues and vagabonds and sturdy beggars wandering and lurking in the country, to the great trouble and terror of the same." Brome's play provided at least a limited recognition of this socio-economic underside of Caroline England.

A Jovial Crew incorporates the type of political satire that is not unusual in dramas of its era. Justice Clack is portrayed as a dictatorial windbag. His "rule" is "to punish before I examine," by the mere facial expressions of the unfortunates brought before him —

I have taken a hundred examinations i' my days of felons, and other offenders, out of their very countenances; and wrote them down verbatim, to what they would have said. I am sure it has serv'd to hang some of 'em, and whip the rest.

Yet Brome goes farther in A Jovial Crew than most dramatists of his era ever dared. His genteel characters find their comfortable lives intolerably oppressive, and long for liberty and freedom, even that of beggars. The references to the Adamites, and to a Utopia of a new social order, seem to presage the radical social movements of the coming Commonwealth era, the Levellers and Diggers and others. The idealisation of the beggars' life, as unrealistic as it is, appears to point to a profound social dissatisfaction.

How much of this came through during stage performances of the play? Perhaps not much, especially after the Restoration of the monarchy in 1660. The second of the performances noted by Pepys, on 27 August 1661, was attended by both King Charles II and his brother the Duke of York, eventually to reign as James II. The version of the play they saw most likely had any political rough edges smoothed away.

== Notes ==
- Cressy, David. England on Edge: Crisis and Revolution, 1640–1642. Oxford, Oxford University Press, 2006.
- Haaker, Ann, ed. Richard Brome. A Jovial Crew, Lincoln, NE University of Nebraska Press, 1968.
- Keenan, Siobhan. Acting Companies and Their Plays in Shakespeare's London. London: Arden, 2014. 164-8.
- Logan, Terence P., and Denzell S. Smith, eds. The Later Jacobean and Caroline Dramatists: A Survey and Bibliography of Recent Studies in English Renaissance Drama. Lincoln, NE, University of Nebraska Press, 1978.
- Plomer, Henry Robert. A Dictionary of the Booksellers and Printers Who Were at Work in England, Scotland and Ireland from 1641 to 1667. The Bibliographical Society/Blades, East & Blades, 1907.
- Ribton-Turner, Charles John. A History of Vagrants and Vagrancy, and Beggars and Begging. London, Chapman and Hall, 1887.
- Sanders, Julie. "Beggars' Commonwealths and the Pre-Civil War Stage: Suckling's The Goblins, Brome's A Jovial Crew, and Shirley's The Sisters." Modern Language Review, Vol. 97 No. 1 (January 2002), pp. 1–14.
- Schultz, William Eben. Gay's Beggar's Opera: Its Content, History, and Influence. New Haven, CT, Yale University Press, 1923.
