= Richard Rolt =

English writer

Richard Rolt (1724–2 March 1770) was an English writer, also known as a poet and librettist.

== Life ==
Rolt was baptized at Shrewsbury, the son of Richard Rolt (died 1739) and Mary Davies. He was educated at Shrewsbury School, at that time under Leonard Hotchkiss. The family was connected to that of Samuel Rolt, Member of Parliament for Bedford. Found a place under an excise officer in the north of England, by John Orlebar, MP and son-in-law of Samuel Rolt, he was suspected of joining the Jacobite army in 1745, and was therefore dismissed from his situation. He then went to Dublin, hoping to obtain employment in Ireland through the influence of his relative on his mother's side Ambrose Philips.

Philips returned with Rolt to London in 1748, dying the next year. By then Rolt had been articled to an attorney, and had been introduced to Whig political circles. Writing for a living, Rolt is said to have composed more than a hundred cantatas, songs, and other pieces for Vauxhall Gardens, Sadler's Wells (where he worked with Thomas Rosoman), and the "legitimate" theatres. He also wrote copiously for periodicals, and acted as an editor. With Christopher Smart, he was employed by Thomas Gardner the bookseller to write a monthly miscellany, The Universal Visiter [sic].

Rolt died on 2 March 1770, aged 45.

== Works ==
With patrons General James Oglethorpe, the Earl of Middlesex, and others, Rolt published Cambria, a Poem in three books (London, 1749), dedicated to Prince George. His Poem … to the memory of Sir Watkin Williams-Wynn, 3rd Baronet, London, 1749, was well received. He then issued An Impartial Representation of the Conduct of the Several Powers of Europe engaged in the late general War … from 1739 … to … 1748 (4 vols. London, 1749–50), which Voltaire enjoyed. His Eliza, a new Musical Entertainment … the Music composed by Mr. Arne (London, 1754), and Almena, an English Opera … the Music composed by Mr. Arne and Mr. Battishill (London, 1764), were successfully produced at Drury Lane Theatre on 20 January 1757, and 2 November 1764 respectively. Another libretto was a translation from Metastasio, The Royal Shepherd (1764), composed by George Rush.

Rolt was given a bad reputation for competence, and is called a "hack compiler". He also published:

- The Ancient Rosciad, 1753.
- Memoirs of the Life of … James Lindesay, Earl of Crawfurd and Lindesay, London, 1753.
- A New and Accurate History of South America, London, 1756.
- A New Dictionary of Trade and Commerce, London, 1756; 2nd ed. London, 1761. Samuel Johnson wrote the preface. Arthur Murphy commented that Johnson, who had planned a similar work, may have supplied Rolt with material. James Boswell's recorded remark from Johnson, that he did not know Rolt and had not read the book, is not really consistent with that report. Rolt did claim acquaintance with Johnson.
- The Lives of the principal reformers, both Englishmen and foreigners, comprehending the general history of the Reformation, from ... 1360 to 1600, London, 1759, with mezzotints by Richard Houston,

and other works. John Sherratt brought Rolt some writing projects at the end of the 1750s, designed to further his own interests in privateering.

Rolt edited from the author's manuscript Travels through Italy (1766), by John Northall.

At his death Rolt left manuscripts, brought out by a group of friends: a History of the Isle of Man, which was published in 1773, and The History of the British Dominions in North America in six volumes. Select Pieces of the late R. Rolt was dedicated to Lady Sondes, daughter of Henry Pelham, a sometime patron of Rolt. It was published in 1772 for the benefit of Rolt's widow Mary, née Perrins.

== Family ==
Rolt was twice married, and left a daughter by each of his wives. His second wife Mary, who survived him many years, was, by her mother, related to the Percys of Worcester. After Rolt's death, Bishop Thomas Percy gave her a pension.

== Notes ==
Attribution

This article incorporates text from a publication now in the public domain: Lee, Sidney, ed. (1897). "Rolt, Richard". Dictionary of National Biography. Vol. 49. London: Smith, Elder & Co.
