= Edward Roome =

Edward Roome (died 1729) was an English lawyer, known as one of the writers of the comic opera The Jovial Crew.

Roome was the son of an undertaker for funerals in Fleet Street in London, and was brought up to the law. In October 1728 Roome succeeded Philip Horneck as Solicitor to the Treasury. He died on 10 December 1729.

== Roome and Alexander Pope ==
Alexander Pope refers to him in The Dunciad. A commentator remarked that Roome wrote "some of the papers called Pasquin, where by malicious innuendos he endeavoured to represent [Pope] guilty of malevolent practices with a great man (Francis Atterbury), then under prosecution of parliament"; Pope retaliated in The Dunciad by associating "Roome's funereal frown" with the "tremendous brow" of William Popple and the "fierce eye" of Philip Horneck. (The Dunciad, iii. 152).

Pope states that the following epigram was made upon Roome:

You ask why Roome diverts you with his jokes,
Yet, if he writes, is dull as other folks?
You wonder at it. This, Sir, is the case:
The jest is lost unless he prints his face!

== The Jovial Crew ==
Fourteen months after his death, The Jovial Crew, a comic opera, adapted from Richard Brome's play A Jovial Crew, was produced at Drury Lane (8 February 1731); the dialogue was curtailed, some parts omitted, and some songs added (fifty-three in all), the work conjointly of Roome, Matthew Concanen and Sir William Yonge. The opera, thus enlivened, had much success, and was frequently revived.
