= Beaumont Brenan =

Beaumont Brenan (died 1761) was an Irish poet and playwright. He was the author of The Painter's Breakfast, a dramatic satire, Dublin, 1756. He is also credited with the production of a comedy, entitled The Lawsuit; Edmund Burke is said to have intended to publish it by subscription, but which never saw the light. He was a painter in Dublin.

== The Painter's Breakfast, plot ==
Pallat, a painter, asks to breakfast some known patrons of art. He then, with the aid of Dactyl, a poet, and Friendly, a comedian, sells by auction as original works some copies of paintings executed by his acquaintance. The proceeds of the sale, after the deduction of the cost of the breakfast and the true value of the paintings, are to be devoted to a fund for the relief of lunatics. The characters include Sir Bubble Buyall, Formal (a connoisseur), Lady Squeeze, Bow and Scrape (two hookers-in).
