= Theodor von Schacht =

German composer (1748–1823)

Theodor von Schacht (1748 in Strasbourg – 20 June 1823 in Regensburg) was a German composer.

After his studies in Stuttgart and Wetzlar, von Schacht arrived in Regensburg as a knight (Hofkavalier). There he was appointed in 1773 director of the court music, and assigned also to direct Italian opera.

In 1796, he was granted a lifetime pension for services rendered.

He composed at least 33 symphonies, one of them published in full in Angerer, Seven Symphonies from the court of Thurn and Taxis at Google Books (pub. Garland, 1984). His compositions also included music for clarinet, including three clarinet concertos (one of them written in 1781), One was recorded by Dieter Klöcker. and a concerto for 3 clarinets. His clarinet concertos are one of the first to use the A clarinet. He composed at least one concerto for two bassoons.
