= Henri-Jacques de Croes =

Flemish composer and violinist

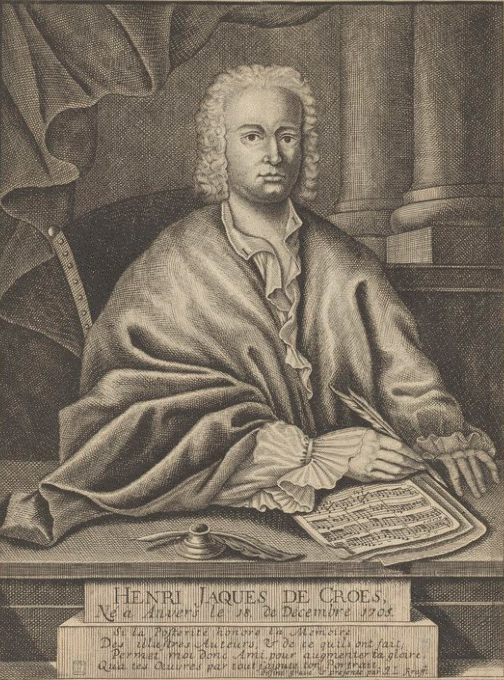
Portrait of de Croes, 1747

Henricus Jacobus de Croes, Hendrik Jacob de Croes, known as Henri-Jacques de Croes (baptised 19 September 1705 in Antwerp, died 16 August 1786 in Brussels) was a Flemish composer and violinist. He was Kapellmeister of Prince Charles Alexander of Lorraine, governor of the Austrian Netherlands whose court was based in Brussels. He composed various violin concertos, masses, motets, chamber music and an opéra comique.

== Life ==
De Croes was the son of Hendrik and Anna Margarita Hollanders and was baptized on 19 September 1705 in Antwerp Cathedral. He received a solid education in prose, languages, composition and so on. He studied music with Josephus Guillielmus Soussé at the St. Andrew's Church in Antwerp. Soussé was a tenor and a singing master at various Antwerp churches including the St. James' Church. De Croes was appointed as the first violinist in the latter church in 1723 when he was only 18 years old and held this position until 1729.

In 1729 he left Antwerp for Frankfurt on Main (Germany) where he worked in the service of the Thurn und Taxis family. Prins Anselm Franz von Thurn und Taxis had discovered de Croes' talent and wished to include him in the new orchestra which he planned to set up in Frankfurt. De Croes joined the orchestra and eventually became its Kapellmeister. He toured with the orchestra and gained an international reputation. When the Thurn und Taxis family was required by the Emperor to move to Regensburg, de Croes decided not to follow them. Instead, he accepted in 1744 a position in Brussels as the Kapellmeister of the Royal Chapel of Prince Charles Alexander of Lorraine, governor of the Austrian Netherlands. The Prince hoped that de Croes would inject new dynamism into the orchestra that was led by the ailing Jean-Joseph Fiocco. After the death of Fiocco in 1746, he took over the leadership of the chapel and was officially charged with this function in 1749, which he did until his death in 1786.

While the Prince of Lorraine was interested in reviving the arts in the Southern Netherlands generally and propping up his own prestige through a flamboyant court, the financial resources provided him by the Empress were limited. As a result de Croes could only rely on a small budget to perform his variety of tasks as Kapellmeister including composing music, teaching music, conducting, organizing concerts at court and accompanying masses. One of his pupils was Pieter van Maldere, whose brothers Willem and Jan Baptist also became members of the orchestra. As a musical director he was known for his strict discipline. He only hired musicians that were fully qualified. He was concerned about the welfare of his musicians and their families. If a musician died, he would take on his son to train him to become a musician who could take up a place in the orchestra.

De Croes married and had two children, a daughter and a son. He trained his son Henri-Joseph born in 1758 as a violinist and composed duets for them to play together. His son could not find a position as a musician in Brussels. Thanks to his connections, he could arrange for his son to audition for the Thurn und Taxis orchestra in Regensburg. After being accepted, Henri-Joseph became like his father, the Kapellmeister of the orchestra, which was a first-rate orchestra which was well-funded and had access to a large musical library.

When his son married the famous opera singer Maria Augusta Houdier, de Croes had to foot part of the extensive bill for the sumptuous wedding. The financial difficulties resulting from this forced him to sell a large portion of his compositions to Prince Charles Alexander of Lorraine.

== Music ==
De Croes worked at the end of the Baroque period and the start of the Galante style. After his stay in Frankfurt, his compositional work was similar to the empfindsamer style and was partly formed by French and Italian influences. His style is distinctive, similar to baroque music, but without the low heavy tones. It focuses on the communication between the instruments.

It is known that he wrote chamber music, sonatas, symphonies, concerts, 15 masses, a Requiem and 34 motets. His opéra comique, Les Amours de Colin et de Colette, which premiered on 4 November 1756 in Brussels, is lost.

== Recordings ==
- Motets, Capella Brugensis and the Collegium Instrumentale Brugense, dir. Patrick Peire (CD Eufoda 1358)
- Carlo van Neste: Concerto Septimo in C minor on Pavane
- Jean-Pierre Rampal: Flute concerts Nos 2, 4 and 5 on Erato
- Ensemble BaroccoTout, Triosonates Op. 5 No. 1–6 La Sonate Égarée, Linn Records, 2018
- Le Pavillon de Musique, dir. Ann Cnop: VI Concerti for Violin, etcetera, 2021

== Bibliography ==
- Champlin, John Denison; Apthorp, William Foster, Cyclopedia or Music & Musicians, Volume 1. Scribner (1893), p. 375.
- Suzanne Clercx-Lejeune, Henri-Jacques de Croes, Compositeur et Maître de Musique du Prince Charles de Lorraine, (Brussels, 1940).
- Marc Honegger, Dictionnaire de la Musique: Les Hommes et Leurs œuvres, v. 1, Bordas, Paris, 1970, 590 p.
- Koen Buyens, Musicians at the Court. The Brussels Court Chapel Among Henri-Jacques de Croes (1749–1786). A social historical study, Brussels, 2001, 224 p.
- Marie Cornaz, Les Éditions Musicales Publiées à Bruxelles au XVIIIE Siècle (1706-1794). Catalog Descriptif et Illustré, Bruxelles, 2008, pp. 58 E.V.
