= Willem de Fesch =

Was a virtuoso Dutch violone player and composer

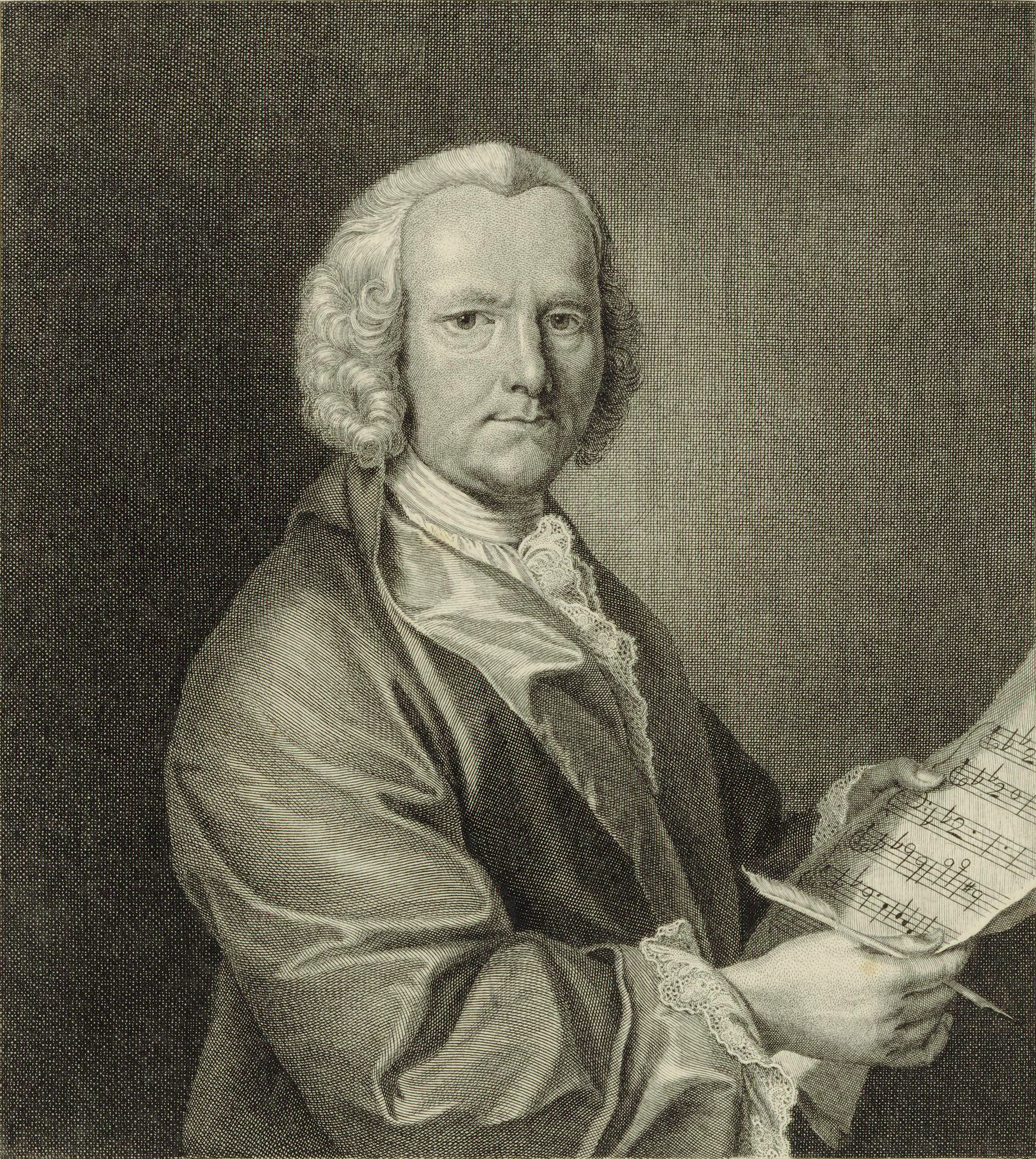
Willem de Fesch

Willem de Fesch (Dutch pronunciation: [ˈʋɪləm də ˈfɛs]; 1687 in Alkmaar – 3 January 1761) was a virtuoso Dutch violinist and composer.

The pupil of Karel Rosier, who was a Vice-Kapellmeister at Bonn, de Fesch later married his daughter, Maria Anna Rosier.

De Fesch was active in Amsterdam between 1710 and 1725. From 1725 to 1731 he served as Kapellmeister at Antwerp Cathedral.

Thereafter he moved to London where he gave concerts and played the violin in Handel's orchestra in 1746. In 1748 and 1749 he conducted at Marylebone Gardens. He apparently made no public appearances after 1750.

His works included the oratorios Judith (1732) and Joseph (1746), as well as chamber duets, solo and trio sonatas, concertos and part songs. Both oratorios were thought lost until 1980 when a copy of a manuscript of Joseph was found in London's Royal Academy of Music.

De Fesch's music was influenced by the Italians, particularly Vivaldi, as well as Handel.

== Works ==
- Op. 1: 6 Sonate per 2 Violini e 6 Sonate per due Cioloncelli (Roger/Amsterdam 1715)
- Op. 2: Molti Concerti e Concerti grossi (Roger/Amsterdam 1717)
- Op. 3: Molti Concerti e Concerti grossi (Roger/Amsterdam 1718)
- Op. 4: 6 Sonate per Violino e Basso continuo (B. c.), 6 Sonate per 2 violoncelli (1725)
- Op. 5: Concerti e Concerti grossi (Le Cène/Amsterdam 1725)
- Op. 6: Sonate per Strumento solo con B. c. (1730)
- Op. 7: 10 Sonate a tre (a 2 Flauti o Violini e Basso continuo) (1733)
- Op. 8: Sonate (1736)
- Op. 9: Sonate per 2 Violini o Flauti (Walsh/London 1739)
- Op. 10: Molti Concerti e Concerti grossi (Walsh/London 1741)
- Op. 11: Duo per 2 Violoni o Flauti (1743)
- Op. 12: Sonate per 2 Violoni o Flauti (1748)
- Op. 13: Sonate per Violoncello e B. c. (1750)
- Carillon (c. 1725–26)
- Missa paschalis (1730)
- Oratorios Judith (1733), Joseph (1745)
