= Nicolas-Médard Audinot =

French actor, singer, impresario & puppeteer (1732–1801)

- Born: 7 June 1732; Bourmont
- Died: 21 May 1801 (aged 68); Paris
- Occupations: Puppeteer; Impresario

Nicolas-Médard Audinot, also Odinot or Oudinot (French: [nikɔla medaʁ odino]; 7 June 1732, Paris – 21 May 1801), was a French actor, singer, impresario, and puppeteer.

He first played at the Comédie Italienne. In 1762, he set up a puppeteer theatre at foire Saint-Germain where each character was an imitation of an actor of the Comédie-Italienne. His wood comedians attracted the crowd, and soon Audinot founded the Théâtre de l'Ambigu-Comique where he substituted children to puppets.

In 1772, he presented grand pantomimes which made his fortune.

He authored Le Tonnelier, an opéra comique presented with success (music by Gossec, Philidor and Trial).

== Bibliography ==
- Michel Faul, Les Tribulations de Nicolas-Médard Audinot, fondateur du théâtre de l'Ambigu-Comique, Symétrie, Lyon, 2013 ISBN 978-2-914373-97-5.
- Laurent Turcot, « De la définition du lieu théâtral populaire : police et spectateurs du boulevard à Paris au XVIIIe siècle », Revue d’histoire du théâtre. no 3, 231, 2006, p. 261-286.
- Laurent Turcot, « Directeur, comédiens et police : relations de travail dans les spectacles populaires à Paris au XVIIIe siècle », Histoire, Économie et Société, janvier-Mars 2004 (1), 23e année, p. 97-120.
