= Henry and Emma =

1709 poem by Matthew Prior

"Henry and Emma, a poem, upon the model of The Nut-brown Maid" is a 1709 poem by Matthew Prior. As the subtitle indicates, the poem is based on the fifteenth-century ballad "The Nut-Brown Maid".

"Henry and Emma" is said to have been written at Wittenham Clumps.

== Legacy ==
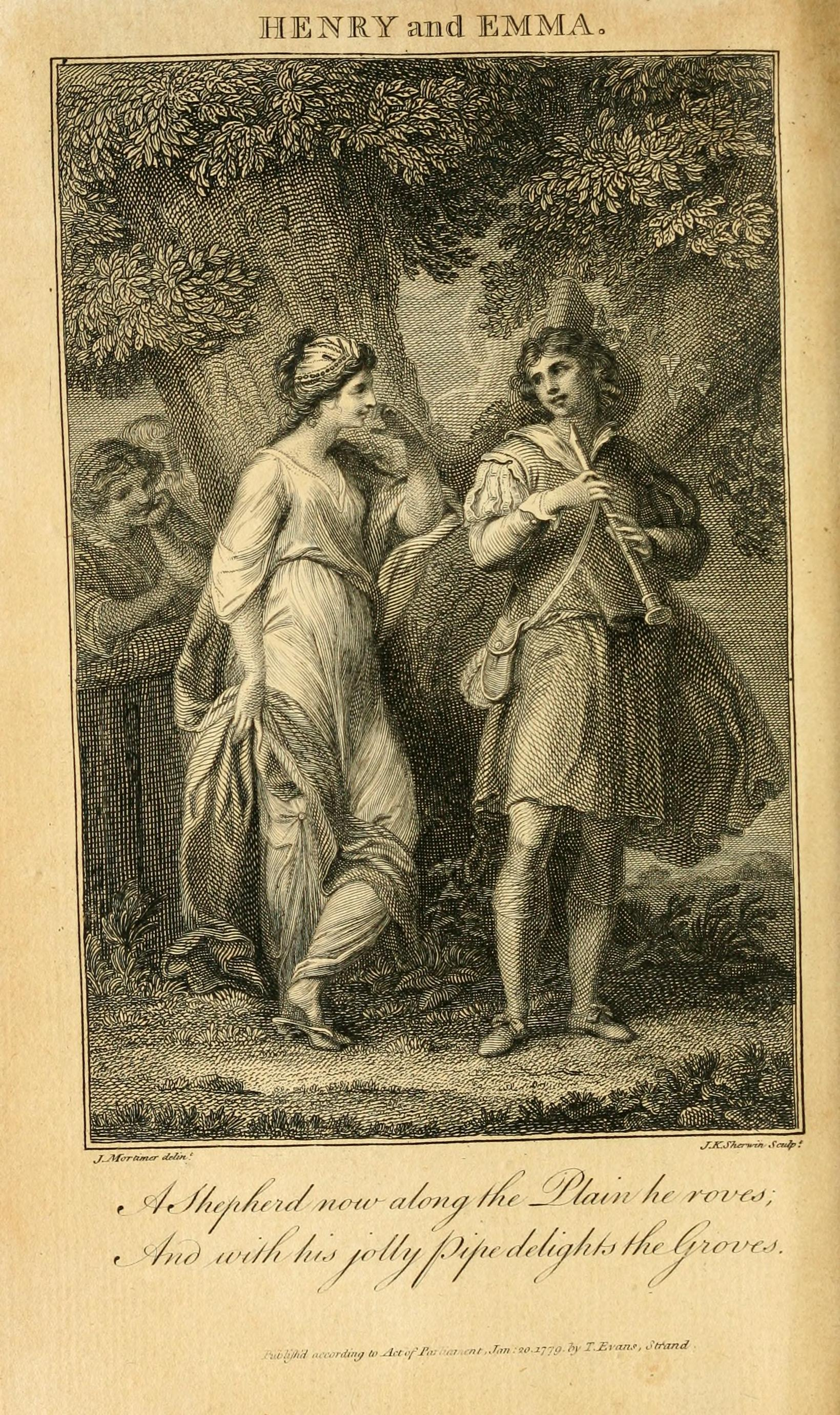
The frontispiece of Matthew Prior's Poetical Works (1779)

"Henry and Emma" was very well known in the eighteenth century and has been credited with popularising the name Emma in England. The success of the poem is reflected in the decision to use an engraving illustrating a scene from "Henry and Emma" as the frontispiece for a 1779 edition of Prior's collected poetry. This was just one of numerous similar prints and paintings produced at this time:

- Francis Cotes's print, 'Anne Sandby as "The Nut-Brown Maid"' (1763) features Anne (wife of Paul Sandby) posing as Emma from "Henry and Emma", standing next to a tree with "Emma" carved into it.
- John Keyse Sherwin's engraving 'Henry and Emma' was chosen as the frontispiece for Matthew Prior, Poetical works. Now first collected, with explanatory notes, and memoirs of the author, Vol. I (London, 1779).
- William Walker's engraving 'Henry and Emma', based on a painting by Thomas Stothard, was used as an illustration in the Lady's Poetical Magazine, Vol II, p. 390, Plate XI (London, 1781).
- William Lawranson's painting 'Henry and Emma', was reproduced as a mezzotint by John Jones (1782).
- John Raphael Smith's paired prints 'Henry' and 'Emma' (London, 1785).
- Robert Sayer's mezzotint 'Henry and Emma' (London 1787) depicts a fashionable woman in 1780s dress adding a ribbon to her lover's hat brim.
- Joseph Slater's etching 'Henry and Emma' (1789).
- Thomas Burke's engraving 'Henry and Emma' (London, 1792).
- Laurie & Whittle's etching 'Henry and Emma' (London, 1794), is a reworking of Robert Sayer's 1787 print. The main difference is that the woman's dress has been updated to the fashion of the mid-1790s.
- Francesco Bartolozzi's etching 'Henry and Emma' (1796).

The continued popularity of 'Henry and Emma' into the early nineteenth century is reflected in the poem's prominence in editions of Matthew Prior's works.

"Henry and Emma" is perhaps best known for being alluded to in Jane Austen's 1817 novel Persuasion, in which Anne Elliot, the protagonist, endeavours to be composed on seeing her love, Captain Wentworth, tend to her friend, Louisa Musgrove, "Without emulating the feelings of an Emma to her Henry". In other words, Anne tries to contain her feelings and not display the abject love for Wentworth that Emma exhibited for Henry. As Paula Backscheider notes, the fact that "Jane Austen could use an unglossed reference to [Matthew Prior's] "Henry and Emma" (1709) in Persuasion (1818) to delineate Anne Elliot’s feelings about Louisa Musgrove and Wentworth" reflects the continuing popularity of "Henry and Emma" in the early nineteenth century. Female poets and authors of the eighteenth and early nineteenth centuries were particularly drawn to Prior's poetry, including Elizabeth Tollet, Anne Finch, Mary Masters, Jane Brereton and Hannah More.
