= List of music biographies in Rees's Cyclopaedia =

The music articles in Rees's Cyclopaedia were written by Charles Burney (1726–1814), with additional material by John Farey Sr. (1766–1826), and John Farey Jr. (1791–1851), and illustrated by 53 plates as well a numerous examples of music typset within the articles.

Charles Burney was well known as the author of a General History of Music, 4 vol 1776–1789 and two travel diaries recording his musical tours collecting information in France and Italy, and later Germany, 1+2 vol, 1771 and 1773, as well as the Commemoration of Handel, 1785 and his Musical Memoirs of Metastasio, 1796. John Farey Sr. was a polymath, well known today for his work as a geologist and for his investigations of the mathematics of sound, and the schemes of tempermant used in tuning musical instruments then. His son, John Farey Jr., was also polymathic in his interests. He contributed numerous drawings for the illustrations of mostly technological and scientific topics in Rees's Cyclopaedia.

Burney's music biographies range from antiquity to the first decade of the nineteenth century. He wrote 756 articles, and while great number of the names, such as Mozart, were featured in his earlier writings, others are unique to the Cyclopaedia. These mainly concern minor London musicians and singers, whom Burney had known personally in his young days. Some are known through modern reference books, but others, often with only surname, only have their memory recorded in the pages of the Cyclopaedia. In a few cases Burney has anglicised Christian names — John Frederick Reichardt, instead of Johann Friedrich, for example.

In his biographies Burney mirrored the Lives of the Poets by Samuel Johnson, namely: a short summary of the subject's reputation, with a summary of his career, a list of his works and an account of his genius and his contribution to music.

Lonsdale has commented that a handful of Burney biographical articles are misplaced in the alphabetical sequence. These occur mostly under the letter A, and were missed in the early stages of writing, when Burney was trying to overtake the press, for he did not start composing the texts until the summer of 1801, when the work was already underway. One, Jacques Arkadelt in Vol 2, appears twice, as Giacomo Arkadelt in Vol, 16 where he is listed in the middle of the Gs, but with a shorter article.

Alphabetisation of articles

The work followed the then common practice of conflating the letters I and J and U and V into single sequences. The topics included in this list therefore follow the sequence they appear in the original volumes.

Annotation

The articles are annotated to Mercer's edition of Burney's History (1935) and Scholes's edition of Burney's Travels (1959). Where a page reference is given the text can be found there. Where a book is cited, but with no page, index entries were found, and Burney is presumed to have written his article using the information there. Where there is no annotation, the article must be unique to the Cyclopaedia

== Vol 1 A-Amarathides ==
Name	Century	Country	Occupation	Columns	Contributor/notes
ABEL, CHARLES FREDERICK	18th	Germany	Composer	0.5	Burney. See Burney's History, Mercer's ed. and see Burney's Musical Tours, Scholes's ed
ADAMI, ANDREA	18th	Italy	Maestro di capella to the Pope	0.1	Burney. See Burney's History, Mercer's ed. and see Burney's Musical Tours, Scholes's ed
AGOSTINO, PAULO, DA VALERONA	17th	Italy	Composer	0.2	Burney. See Burney's History, Mercer's ed. under Agostini
ALBERTI, DOMENICO	18th	Italy	Composer	0.6	Burney. See Burney's History, Mercer's ed. and see Burney's Musical Tours, Scholes's ed
ALCMAN	Antiquity	Greece	Composer	0.6	Burney. See Burney's History, Mercer's ed.
ALESSANDRI, FELICE	18th	Italy	Composer	0.2	Burney. See Burney's History, vol 2, p 874 of Mercer's ed.
ALLEGRI, GREGORIO	17th	Italy	Composer	2.0	Burney. See Burney's History, Mercer's ed. and see Burney's Musical Tours, Scholes's ed
ALYPIUS	Antiquity	Greece	Writer on music	0.6	Burney. See Burney's History, Mercer's ed. Cross-referenced to GREEK MUSIC and NOTATION.

== Vol 2 Amarantus-Arteriotomy ==
Name	Century	Country	Occupation	Columns	Contributor/notes
AMATI FAMILY	17th	Italy	Instrument makers	0.1	Burney. Cross-referenced to STRADUARIUS and STEINER
AMOREVOLI, ANGELO	18th	Italy	Singer	0.2	Burney. See Burney's History, Mercer's ed.
ANTIGENIDES	Antiquity	Greece	Musician	0.9	Burney. See Burney's History, Mercer's ed.
ARION	Antiquity	Greece	Musician	0.4	Burney. See Burney's History, Mercer's ed.
ARIOSTI, ATTILIO	17-18th	Italy	Composer	0.4	Burney. See Burney's History, Mercer's ed.
ARISTOXENUS	Antiquity	Greece	Writer on music	2.5	Burney. See Burney's History, Mercer's ed.
ARKADELT, JACQUES	16th	Holland	Composer	0.3	Burney. See Burney's History, Mercer's ed. See also article GIACOMO ARKADELT in Vol 16
ARNE, THOMAS AUGUSTINE	18th	England	Composer	3.0	Burney. See Burney's History, Mercer's ed.
ARNE, MICHAEL	18th	England	Musician	0.2	Burney. Son of the preceding.
ARNOLD, SAMUEL	18th	England	Composer	2.0	Burney. See Burney's History, Mercer's ed.

== Vol 3 Artery-Battersea ==
Name	Century	Country	Occupation	Columns	Contributor/notes
ARTUSI, GIOVANNI MARIA	16th	Italy	Writer on music	0.8	Burney. See Burney's History, Mercer's ed.
ASAPH	Antiquity	Israel	Musician	0.2	Burney.
AVISON, CHARLES	18th	England	Organist and composer	0.4	Burney. See Burney's History, Mercer's ed.
BABBINI, MATTEO	18th-19th	Italian	Singer	0.2	Burney. See Burney's History, Mercer's ed.
BABEL, WILLIAM	18th	English	Musician	0.6	Burney. See Burney's History, vol 2 p 996 of Mercer ed.
BACCHIUS, SR.	Antiquity	Greece	Writer on Music	0.2	Burney.
BACH, SEBASTIAN	17th-18th	Germany	Composer	1.3	Burney. See Burney's History, Mercer's ed.
BACH, CHARLES PHILIP EMMANUEL	18th	Germany	Composer	1.0	Burney. See Burney's History, Mercer's ed. and see Burney's Musical Tours, Scholes's ed
BACH, JOHN CHRISTIAN	18th	Germany	Composer	2.2	Burney. See Burney's History, Mercer's ed. and see Burney's Musical Tours, Scholes's ed
BAGLIONI, CONSTANZA	18th	Italy	Singer	0.1	Burney. See Burney's History, Mercer's ed. and see Burney's Musical Tours, Scholes's ed
BAÏF, JOHN ANTHONY	16th	Italy	Composer	0.5	Burney. See Burney's History, Mercer's ed.
BALTAZARINI DI BELGIOIOSO	16th	Italy	Composer & Choreographer	0.3	Burney. See Burney's History, Mercer's ed. Cross-referenced to BALET de la Royne
BALTZAR, THOMAS	17th	Germany	Violinist and composer	1.0	Burney. See Burney's History, vol 2, p 337 of Mercer's ed.
BANTI, BRIGIDA GEORGI	18th	Italy	Singer	1.3	Burney.
BARBELLA, EMANUEL	18th	Italy	Violinist	0.9	Burney. See Burney's History, vol 2, pp 451–2 of Mercer's ed. and see Burney's Musical Tours, Scholes's ed Cross-referenced to CORELLI and GEMINIANI.
BARBIER, MISTRESS [JANE]	18th	England	Singer	1.0	Burney. See Burney's History, vol 2, pp 678–9 of Mercer's ed.
BASSANI, GIOVANNI BATISTA	17th-18th	Italy	Composer	0.5	Burney. See Burney's History, Mercer's ed.
BATES, JOAH	18th	England	Musician	2.6	Burney. See Burney's Musical Tours, Scholes's ed. Cross-referenced to COMMEMORATION OF HANDEL and HANDEL.
BATESON, THOMAS	17th	England	Madrigalist	0.2	Burney. See Burney's History, Mercer's ed. under Batson.

== Vol 4 Battery-Bookbinding ==
Name	Century	Country	Occupation	Columns	Contributor/notes
BEARD, JOHN	18th	England	Singer	0.4	Burney. See Burney's History, Mercer's ed.
BENEVOLI, ORAZIO	17th	Italy	Maestro da capella to the Pope	0.8	Burney. See Burney's History, Mercer's ed. and see Burney's Musical Tours, Scholes's ed
BERARDI, ANGELO	17th	Italy	Writer on music	0.2	Burney. See Burney's History, vol 2, p 430 of Mercer's ed.
BERNABEL, ERCOLE	17th-18th	Italy	Church composer	1.0	Burney. See Burney's History, vol 2, pp 418–9 of Mercer's ed.
BERNACCHI, ANTONIO	18th	Italy	Singer	0.3	Burney. See Burney's History, Mercer's ed. and see Burney's Musical Tours, Scholes's ed
BERNASCONI, ANDREA	17th	Italy	Composer	0.1	Burney.
BERNASCONI, la Signora [Antonia]	18th	Italy	Singer	0.2	Daughter of the preceding. Burney. See Burney's History, Mercer's ed.
BEVIN, ELWAY	17th	England	Church composer	0.7	Burney. See Burney's History, vol 2, p 263-4 of Mercer's ed. Cross-referenced to MICHELI and VALENTUINI
BEZOZZI, ALEXANDER & JEROM	18th	Italy	Musicians	1.3	Burney. See Burney's Musical Tours, Scholes's ed
BIRD, WILLIAM	16th	England	Composer	3.8	Burney. See Burney's History, vol 2, pp 74–82 of Mercer's ed. With example of notation.
[de] BLAINVILLE, CHARLES-HENRI	18th	France	Composer and writer on music	1.4	Burney. See Burney's History, Mercer's ed. and see Burney's Musical Tours, Scholes's ed
BLAVET, MICHEL	18th	France	Flautist	0.4	Burney. See Burney's History, Mercer's ed.
BLOW, JOHN	18th	England	Composer of church music	2.5	Burney. See Burney's History, vol 2, pp 350–352, 356 of Mercer's ed.
BOCCHERINI, LUIGI	18th	Italy	Composer	0.2	Burney. See Burney's History, vol 2, pp 449, 455 of Mercer's ed
BONNET, JAQUES	18th	France	Writer on music	0.7	Burney. See Burney's History, vol 2, p 223 note (h) of Mercer's ed.
BONONCINI, GIOVANNI MARIA	17th	Italy	Writer on music	0.7	Burney. See Burney's History, Mercer's ed. With example of notation.
BONONCINI, JOHN	18th	Italy	Opera composer	3.2	Burney. See Burney's History, Mercer's ed. Son of the preceding
BONONCINI, ANTONIO	18th	Italy	Opera composer	0.3	Burney. See Burney's History, Mercer's ed. Brother of the preceding.
BONTEMPI, ANGELINI	17th	Italy	Historian of Music	0.5	Burney. See Burney's History, Mercer's ed.

== Vol 5 Book-keeping-Calvart ==
Name	Century	Country	Occupation	Columns	Contributor/notes
BOYCE, WILLIAM	18th	England	Organist & Composer	1.4	Burney. See Burney's History, vol 2, pp 492–494, of Mercer's ed.
BRENT, MISS [CHARLOTTE]	18th	England	Singer	0.2	Burney. Burney, HistoryVol 2, p 865 of Mercer's ed.
BROSSARD, SEBASTIAN	17th-18th	France	Writer on music	0.5	Burney. See Burney's History, Mercer's ed.
BROWN, ABRAHAM	18th	England	Violinist	0.2	Burney. See Burney's History, vol 2, pp 1012–1013, of Mercer's ed.
BRUMEL, ANTHONY	15th-16th	France	Composer	0.2	Burney. See Burney's History, vol 1, pp 765–6, of Mercer's ed.
BRYENNUIS, MANUEL	14th	Greece	Musical writer	0.8	Burney. See Burney's History, Mercer's ed.
BULL, DR JOHN	16th	England	Composer	3.6	Burney. See Burney's History, Mercer's ed.
BURTON, JOHN	18th	England	Harpsichordist	0.3	Burney. See Burney's History, vol 2, p 1018, of Mercer's ed.
BUTLER, CHARLES	17th	England	Writer on singing	0.3	Burney. See Burney's History. vol 2, p 317, of Mercer's ed.
BUTLER, ----	18th	England	Harpsichordist and organist	0.2	Burney.
BUXTEHUDE, DIET[E]RICH	17th-18th	Denmark	Organist	0.3	Burney. See Burney's History. vol 2, p 458, of Mercer's ed.
CACCINI, GUILIO ROMANO	16th	Italy	Composer and singer	1.1	Burney. See Burney's History, Mercer's ed. Cross-referenced to RECITATIVE and OPERA.
CAFFARELLI, stage name of GAETANO MAJORENO	18th	Italy	Castrato	1.4	Burney. See Burney's History, Mercer's ed. and see Burney's Musical Tours, Scholes's ed
CALDARA, ANTONIO	17th-18th	Italy	Composer	0.5	Burney. See Burney's History, Mercer's ed.
CALMET, DON AUGUSTINE	17th	France	Bible commentator	1.1	Final paragraphs, by Burney, comment on Calmet's writings on Hebrew music.

== Vol 6 Calvary-Castra ==
Name	Century	Country	Occupation	Columns	Contributor/notes
CAMBERT, [ROBERT]	17th	France	Opera composer	0.4	Burney. See Burney's History. vol 2, p 317, of Mercer's ed.
CAMPRA, ANDREW	17th-18th	France	Composer	0.2	Burney. After Moreri. See Burney's History, Mercer's ed.
CANNABICH, [JOHANN CHRISTIAN INNOCENZ BONAVENTURA]	18th	Germany	Composer	0.1	Burney.
APRILE GIUSEPPE	18th	Italy	Opera Singer	0.5	Burney. Forgotten by Burney, but added here since the precious article, CANTARE, mentions him.
CAPELLA, MARTIANUS MINEUS FELIX	1st	Italy	Writer on music	1.0	Burney.
CAPORALE, CAESAR	18th	Italy	Cellist	0.1	Burney. See Burney's History, Mercer's ed.
CARBONELLI, STEFFANO	18th	Italy	Violinist	0.5	Burney. See Burney's History of Mercer's ed.
CARESTINI, GIOVANNI	18th	Italy	Singer	0.8	Burney. See Burney's History, vol 2, p 782, of Mercer's ed.
CAREY, HENRY	18th	England	Poet and composer	2.3	Burney. See Burney's History, Mercer's ed.
CARISSIMI, GIACOMO	17th	Italy	Composer	2.0	Burney. See Burney's History, Mercer's ed.

== Vol 7 Castramentation-Chronology ==
Name	Century	Country	Occupation	Columns	Contributor/notes
CASTRUCCI, PIETRO	18th	Italy	Violinist	1.0	Burney. See Burney's History. Mercer's ed. and see Burney's Musical Tours, Scholes's ed
CAVALIERI, EMILO DEL	16th	Italy	Composer	0.2	Burney. See Burney's History, Mercer's ed. Cross-referenced to RECITATIVE, OPERA and ORATORIO
CAVALLI, FRANCESCO	17th	Italy	Composer	0.2	Burney.
CAURROY, FRANCIS EUSTACHE DU	16th	France	Composer	0.3	Burney. Burney's History Vol 2, p229ff in Mercer's ed.
CECILIA, SAINT	1st	Italy	Patron saint of Music	2.1	Burney. Burney's History Vol 1, p663 in Mercer's ed. Includes a discussion of the celebration of Saint Cecilia Day, 22 November.
CELESTINI, ELIGIO	18th	Italy	Violinist	0.1	Burney.
CERONE, DOMINICO PEDRO	17th	ITALY	Writer on Music	0.3	Burney. See Burney's History, Mercer's ed.
CESTI, PADRE MARC'ANTONIO D'AVAZZI	17th	Italy	Composer	0.8	Burney. See Burney's History, Mercer's ed. Cross-referenced to OPERA, CANTATA AND RECITATIVE
DE CHABANON, [MICHEL PAUL GUY]	18th	France	Writer on music and violinist	1.8	Burney.
CHARKE, RICHARD	18th	England	Dancing master and composer	0.6	Burney.
CHARLES I	17th	England	King of England	6.7	1.7 columns by Burney of this biographical article are devoted to the music of his reign. See Burney's History, Mercer's ed.
CHARLES II	17th	England	King of England	9.0	3.1 columns by Burney of this biographical article are devoted to music of his reign. See Burney's History, Mercer's ed.
CHILD, WILLIAM	17th	England	Composer	0.8	Burney. See Burney's History, Mercer's ed.

== Vol 8 Chronometer-Colliseum ==
Name	Century	Country	Occupation	Columns	Contributor/notes
CIAMPI, VINCENZO	18th	Italy	Opera composer	0.4	Burney. See Burney's History, Mercer's ed.
CIBBER, MRS SUSANNAH MARIA	18th	England	Singer	0.9	Burney. See Burney's History, Mercer's ed.
CIMAROSA, DOMINICO	18th	Italy	Opera composer	0.9	Burney. Burney's History, Mercer's ed.
CIPRANDI, [Ercole]	18th	Italy	Singer	0.3	Burney. See Burney's History, Mercer's ed.
DI RORE, CIPRIAN	16th	Italy	Composer	0.3	Burney. See Burney's History. vol 2, p 251, of Mercer's ed. Rees had this indexed as Ciprian, Rore
CIRRI, GIOVANNI BATTISTA	18th	Italy	Composer and cellist	0.2	Burney.
CLAIR, JEAN-MARIE LE	18th	France	Composer and violinist	0.6	Burney. See Burney's History, Mercer's ed. Indexed as Leclair.
CLARKE, JEREMIAH	17th-18th	England	Composer and organist	1.1	Burney. See Burney's History, vol 2, p 475-6, of Mercer's ed.
CLAUDE, LE JEUNE	16th	France	Composer	0.5	Burney. See Burney's History, Mercer's ed. Indexed under Jeune.
CLAYTON, THOMAS	17th-18th	England	Composer and librettist	1.6	Burney. See Burney's History, Mercer's ed.
CLEGG, JOHN	18th	England	Violinist	0.2	Burney. See Burney's History, Mercer's ed.
CLEMENS NON PAPA, JACOB	16th	Holland	Composer	0.3	Burney. See Burney's History, vol 2, p 250, of Mercer's ed.
COCCHI, GIOACCHINO	18th	Italy	Composer	1.5	Burney. See Burney's History, pp 862–3, of Mercer's ed.
COLISTA, [MATTEI]	18th	Italy	Organist	0.4	Burney.
COLLET, RICHARD	18th	England	Violinist	0.1	Burney. See Burney's History, vol 2, p 1011, of Mercer's ed.

== Vol 9 Collision-Corne ==
Name	Century	Country	Occupation	Columns	Contributor/notes
COLONNA, GIOVANNI PAOLA	17th	Italy	Composer	0.8	Burney. See Burney's History, Mercer's ed.
COOK, CAPT HENRY	17th	England	Choirman	0.5	Burney. See Burney's History, Mercer's ed.
COOK, BENJAMIN	18th	England	Organist	0.5	Burney. See Burney's History, vol 2, p 989 of Mercer's ed.
COPERARIO, GIOVANNI, or COOPER, JOHN	17th	England	Composer	0.5	Burney. In Italy known as Giovanni Coperario. See Coperario in Burney's History, Mercer's ed.
CORELLI, ARCANGELO	17th-18th	Italy	Composer	6.9	Burney. Includes example of notation. See Burney's History, vol 2, pp 437–444, of Mercer's ed

== Vol 10 Cornea-Czyrcassy ==
Name	Century	Country	Occupation	Columns	Contributor/notes
COUPERIN, FAMILY	17-18th	France	Composers	1.0	Burney. See Burney's History, Mercer's ed. Cross-referenced to DOIGHTER and FINGERING.

== Vol 11 D-Dissimilitude ==
Name	Century	Country	Occupation	Columns	Contributor/notes
DALLANS [sic], RALPH	17th	England	Organ builder	0.4	Burney. See Burney's History, vol 2, pp 343–4 of Mercer's ed.
DAMIANI, --	18th-19th	Italy	Singer	0.2	Burney. See Burney's History, Mercer's ed.
DAMON	Antiquity	Greece	Musician	0.5	Burney. See Burney's History, Mercer's ed.
DAMON, WILLIAM	16th	England	Composer	0.3	Burney, See Burney's History, vol 2, pp 51–2 of Mercer's ed.
D'AVELLA, GIOVANNI	17th	Italy	Writer on music	0.3	Burney. See Burney's History, vol 1, p. 471 of Mercer's ed.
DAVIDE, GIACOMO	18th	Italy	Singer	0.3	Burney.
DAY, JOHN	16th	England	Printer of music	0.2	Burney. See Burney's History, Mercer's ed.
DE AMACIS, ANNA	18th	Italy	Singer	0.6	Burney. See Burney's History, vol 2, pp 864–865 of Mercer's ed.
DEFESCH [WILLEM]	18th	Holland	Composer and violinist	0.3	Burney. See Burney's History, vol 2, pp 781, 1015 of Mercer's ed
MURIS, JOHN DE	14th	France	Writer on music	6.5	Burney. See Burney's History, vol 1, pp 545–55 of Mercer's ed. Includes example of notation.
DENTICI, LUIGI	16th	Italy	Writer on music	0.7	Burney. See Burney's History, Vol 2, pp 135–136 of Mercer's ed.
DESMARETS, HENRI	17th-18th	France	Compose	0.3	Burney.
DIDYMUS OF ALEXANDRIA	Antiquity	Egypt	Writer on Music	0.6	Burney. See Burney's History, Vol 1, pp 354–355 of Mercer's ed.
DIETTER, CHRISTIAN LUDWIG	18th	Germany	Composer	0.3	Burney.
DIEUPART, CHARLES	17th-18th	France	Violinist	0.7	Burney.
DIRUTA, GIROLAMO	17th	Italy	Organist	0.2	Burney. See Burney's History, Vol 2, pp 426–427 of Mercer's ed.

== Vol 12 Dissimulation-Eloane ==
Name	Century	Country	Occupation	Columns	Contributor/notes
DITTERS, CHARLES	18th	Germany	Composer	0.6	Burney. See Burney's History, Vol 2, p 943 of Mercer's ed
DOMENICO ANIBALI	18th	Italy	Singer	0.3	Burney. NB Should be Anibali, Domenico. It was left out of an earlier volume. See Burney's History, Mercer's ed
DONATO, BALDASSAVE	16th	Italy	Composer	0.2	Burney. See Burney's History, Vol 2, p 174 of Mercer's ed, where his Christian name is correctly given as Baldassare.
DONI, ANTON FRANCISCO	16th	Italy	Musician	1.0	Burney. See Burney's History, Mercer's ed.
DONI, JOHN BAPTISTA	18th	Italy	Writer on Music	1.4	Burney. See Burney's History, Mercer's ed.
DOWLAND, JOHN	16th-17th	England	Composer	1.3	Burney. See Burney's History, Vol 2, p 116-118 of Mercer's ed.
DRAGHI, GIOVANNI BATTISTA	17th-18th	Italy	Organist	0.2	Burney. See Burney's History, Mercer's ed.
DRYDEN, JOHN	17th	England	Poet and Dramatist	5.2	Anonymous author. The article concludes with 2 columns (clearly by Burney) about Dryden the Librettist. See Burney's History, Mercer's ed.
DUBOURG, MATTHEW	18th	England	Violinist	0.7	Burney. See Burney's History, Vol 2, p 998 of Mercer's ed.
DUNI, EGIDIO RAMUALDO	18th	Italy	Composer	1.1	Burney. See Burney's History, Mercer's ed. After Laborde. Cross-referenced to PERGOLESI.
DUNSTABLE, JOHN	15th	England	Composer	0.8	Burney. See Burney's History, Vol 1, pp 677–678 of Mercer's ed. With example of notation.
DUNSTAN, SAINT	1st	England	Saint	2.4	Anonymous author, but it is concluded by 0.7 columns by Burney. See Burney's History, Vol 1, pp 452–453 of Mercer's ed.
DUPHLY, [JACQUES]	18th	France	Harpsichordist	0.2	Burney.
DUPORT,[JEAN-PIERRE OR JEAN-LOUIS]	18th-19th	France	Cellists	0.1	Burney.
DUPUIS, THOMAS SAUNDERS	18th	England	Organist	0.1	Burney. See Burney's History, Mercer's ed.
DUPUIS, Ericus	11th	?	Music theorist	0.2	Burney, after Mersene and Laborde.
DURANTE, FRANCESCO	18th	Italy	Composer	0.5	Burney. See Burney's History, Mercer's ed.
DURASTANTE, LA MARGARITA	18th	Italy	Singer	0.3	Burney. See Burney's History, Mercer's ed.
EBELING, CHRISTOPH DANIEL	18th-19th	Germany	Scholar	0.3	Burney. He translated Burney's Musical Tours into German, 1772
ECKARD, JOHANN GOTTFRIED	18th-19th	Germany	Harpsichordist	0.6	Burney. See Burney's History, Mercer's ed.
EDELMAN, JOHN FRIEDRICH	18th	France	Composer	0.3	Burney.
EICHNER, [ERNST]	18th	Germany	Bassoonist and composer	0.2	Burney. See Burney's History, Vol 2, p 957 of Mercer's ed.
ELECTOR OF BAVARIA, the late	18th	Germany	Viol da Gamba player and composer	0.1	Burney.
ELECTRESS DOWAGER OF SAXONY	18th	Germany	Singer and composer	0.3	Burney.
ELISI, FILIPPO	18th	Italy	Singer	0.3	Burney. See Burney's History, Mercer's ed.

== Vol 13 Elocution-Extremities ==
Name	Century	Country	Occupation	Columns	Contributor/notes
ESTEVE, M	18th	France	Writer on music	0.3	Burney. Cross-referenced to BASSE fondamentale
EULER, LEONARD	18th	Switzerland	Mathematician and writer on music	1.2 col of 3.3	Farey Sr. Cross-referenced to COMPASS
EXIMENO, ANTONIO	18th	Spain	Writer on music	0.6	Burney, See Burney's History, Vol 2, p 939 of Mercer's ed.

== Vol 14 Extrinsic-Food (part) ==
Name	Century	Country	Occupation	Columns	Contributor/notes
FABER, HENRY	16th	Germany	Writer on music	0.1	Burney. See Burney's History, Vol 1, pp 471, 475 of Mercer's ed.
FABER, GREGORY	16th	Switzerland	Writer on Music	0.1	Burney. See Burney's History, Vol 2, p 205 of Mercer's ed.
FABER, JACOBUS STAPULENSIS	16th	France	Writer on Music	1.0	Burney. See Burney's History Vol 2, p 211 of Mercer's ed.
FABIO, SIGNOR	18th	Italy	Violinist	0.3	Burney. See Burney Musical Tours, vol 2 p 283-4 of Scholes's ed.
FABRIS, LUCCA	18th	Italy	Singer	0.4	Burney
FAIDIT, ANSELM	14th	France	Troubidor	0.3	Burney. See Burney's History, Vol 1, pp 573–4 of Mercer's ed
FAIRFAX, ROBERT	16th	England	Composer	1.6	Burney. See Burney's History, Mercer's ed. under Fayrfax
FARINELLI, CARLO BROSCHI	18th	Italy	Composer	7.2	Burney. See Burney's History of Mercer's ed.
FARMER, JOHN	16th	England	Composer	0.2	Burney. See Burney's History, vol 2, p 114 of Mercer's ed
FARNABY, GILES	16th-17th	England	Organist and composer	0.5	Burney. See Burney's History, Mercer's ed.
FAVALLI, ?	18th-18th	Italy	Singer	0.2	Burney.
FAUSTINA BORDONE	18th	Italy	Singer	2.1	Burney. See Burney's History, vol 2, pp 737–738 of Mercer's ed.
FEL, MARIE	18th	France	Singer	0.2	Burney, quoting Laborde.
FEREBE, GEORGE	16th-17th	England	Clergyman and musician	0.5	Burney.
FERRARI, BENEDETTO	17th	Italy	Composer	0.2	Burney. See Burney's History, Mercer's ed.
FERRI, BALTAZAR	17th	Italy	Singer	0.8	Burney. See Burney's History, vol 2, p 558 of Mercer's ed.
FESTA, CONSTANTIUS	16th	Italy	Composer	0.5	Burney. See Burney's History, Vol 1 p 701, Vol 2 pp 198–200 of Mercer's ed.
FESTING, MICHAEL CHRISTIAN	18th	England	Violinist	0.3	Burney. See Burney's History Mercer's ed.
AGUJARI, LUCRETIA	18th	Italy	Singer	0.7	Burney. Forms part of the article FILER un Son. See Burney's History, Mercer's ed.
FINCK, HERMAN	16th	Germany	Writer on music	0.1	Burney. See Burney's History, vol 2, p 205 of Mercer's ed.
FINGER, GODFREY	16th-17th	Germany	Viol player and composer	0.2	Burney. See Burney's History, Mercer's ed.
FIORONI, GIAN. ANDREA	18th	Italy	Choir master	0.2	Burney.
FISCHER, JOHN CHRISTIAN	18th	Germany	Hautbois player	2.3	Burney. See Burney's History, Mercer's ed.
FOLIANUS, LUDOVICA	16th	Italy	Writer on music	0.7	Burney. Cross-referenced to DIDYMUS, PTOLEMY and TEMPERAMENT.

== Vol 15 Food(part)-Generation (part) ==
Name	Century	Country	Occupation	Columns	Contributor/notes
FORQUERAG [sic], ANTHONY AND JOHN BAPTIST ANTHONY	17th-18th	France	Musicians	0.4	Burney. After Laborde. They were father and son. The surname should be Forqueray.
FOUCHS [sic], JOHANN JOSEPH	18th	Austrian	Writer on music and composer	1.2	Burney. Should be Fux.
FOUGHT, [HENRY]	18th	Lapland	Music printer	3.0	Burney. He worked in London, and on 24 December 1767 obtained a patent for printing music by movable type (No 888). (Bennet Woodcroft, Alphabetical Index of Patentees of Inventions, 1854, p 198.
FRAGUIER, CLAUDE FRANÇOIS	17th-18th	France	Academician and writer on Music	1.6	Burney. See Burney's History, Mercer's ed
FRAMERY, NICHOLAS STEPHEN	18th	France	Opera librettist	0.1	Burney.
FRANC, GUILLAUMS	16th	France	Composer	0.3	Burney. See Burney's History, vol 2, p45 of Mercer's ed. Cross-referenced to PSALMODY.
FRANCESCHELLO, ----	18th	Italy	Cellist	0.3	Burney. See Burney's History, Vol 2, p 692
LA FRANCESINA (ELISABETTA DU PARC)	18th	Italy	Singer	0.3	Burney. See Burney's History, Mercer's ed.
FRANCESIO, ARAIA	18th	Italy	Choir master and composer	0.4	Burney.
FRANCO, MAGISTER (of Cologne)	11th	France	Music theorist	5.5	Burney. See Burney's History, Mercer's ed.
FRANCOEUR, FRANÇOIS	18th	France	Opera composer and conductor	0.6	Burney. See Burney's History, Mercer's ed. After Laborde.
FRANCOEUR, LOUIS-JOSEPH	18th	France	Opera Composer and conductor	0.2	Burney. Nephew of the preceding.
FRASI, GUILIA	18th	Italy	Singer	1.5	Burney. See Burney's History, Mercer's ed.
FRESCOBALDI, GIROLAMO	17th	Italy	Organist and harpsichordist	1.2	Burney. See Burney's History, Mercer's ed.
FRITZ, GASPARO	18th	Switzerland	Violinist and composer	0.3	Burney. See Burney Musical Travels, vol 1, pp 41–2 of Scholes's ed
FROBERGER, JOHN JACOB	17th	Germany	Organist	0.3	Burney. See Burney's History, Mercer's ed.
GABRIELI, ANDREA	16th	Italy	Organist and choir master	0.2	Burney. See Burney's History, vol 2, p 433 of Mercer's ed.
GABRIELLI, GIOVANNI	16th	Italy	Composer	0.1	Burney.
GABRIELLI, CATTERINA	18th	Italy	Singer	1.0	Burney. See Burney's History vol 2, p881-2, of Mercer's ed.
GALILEI, VINCENZIO	16th	Italy	Lutenist and writer on music	1.4	Burney. See Burney's History, Mercer's ed.
GALLIARD, JOHN ERNEST	18th	Germany	Hautbois player and composer	0.9	Burney. See Burney's History, vol 2, pp 989–990 of Mercer's ed.
GALLICULUS, JOHN	16th	Germany	Writer on music	0.3	Burney. See Burney's History, vol 2, pp 202, 206 of Mercer's ed.
GALLINI, SIR JOHN	18th	Italy	Impresario	2.6	Burney. See Burney's History, vol 2, p 897 of Mercer's ed.
GASSENDI, PETER	17th	France	Philosopher and writer on music	3.2	There is a 0.4 column note by Burney about his musical work at the end. Includes example of notation.
GASTOLDI, GIOVANNI GIACOMO	16th-17th	Italy	Composer	0.3	Burney. See Burney's History, Vol 2, pp, 184, 188-9, 317 of Mercer's ed.
GEMINIANI, FRANCESCO	17th-18th	Italy	Writer on music and composer	2.6	Burney. See Burney's History, Mercer's ed.
GENARO, MANNI	18th	Italy	Composer	0.2	Burney

== Vol 16 Generation (part)- Gretna ==
Name	Century	Country	Occupation	Columns	Contributor/notes
GIACOMELLI, GEMINIANO	18th	Italy	Composer	0.2	Burney.
GIACOMO ARKADELT	17th	Holland	Madrigalist	0.2	Burney. Wrongly alphabetised here. His name was Jaques Arcadelt. See Burney's History p 234-24 of Mercer's ed. See also article JACQUES ARKEDELT in Vol 2
GIARDINI, FELICE	18th	Italy	Violinist	3.3	Burney. See Burney's History, Mercer's ed.
GIBBONS, ORLANDO	17th	England	Composer	1.3	Burney. See Burney's History, Mercer's ed. Cross-referenced toFANTASIA and PARTHENIA
GIBBONS, Dr. Christopher, Edward and Ellis	16t-17th	England	Musicians	0.5	Burney. See Burney's History, Mercer's ed. Son and brothers of the preceding.
GIORGIO, ANTONIOTTO	18th	Italy	Writer on music	1.6	Burney. Wrongly alphabetised here. His name was Giorgio Antoniotto. Cross-referenced to FRANCO and DE MURIS.
GIOVANI, ANSANI	18th	Italy	Opera singer	0.9	Burney. Wrongly alphabetised here. His name was Giovani Ansani. See Burney's History vol 2, p 891 of Mercer's ed.
GIRALDUS, SILVESTER, CAMBRENSIS	12th	Wales	Historian	1.2	Burney. Discusses his account of singing in Wales and the North of England. See Burney's History, vol 1, pp 482–4 of Mercer's ed
GIRELLI, AGUILAR	18th	Italy	Opera singer	0.2	Burney. See Burney's History, vol 2, pp 878, 894 of Mercer's ed.
GIUSEPPE APRILE	18th-19th	Italy	Opera singer and writer on music	1 line	Burney. Cross-referenced to TENDUCCI. Wrongly alphabetised here.
GIUSTINELLI [GIUSEPPI]	18th	Italy	Opera singer	0.1	Burney. See Burney's History, vol 2, pp 864, 867 of Mercer's ed.
GIZZIELLO, GIOACHINA, CONTI	18th	Italy	Opera singer	0.9	Burney. See Burney's History, Mercer's ed
DOMENICO ANNIBILI	18th	Italy	Opera singer	0.5	Burney. Wrongly alphabetised here and included at the end of the previous article. See Burney's History, Mercer's ed
GLAREANUS, HENRICUS, LORITUS	15th	Switzerland	Writer on music	0.6	Burney. His name was Henry Lorit. See Burney's History, vol 2, 204-5 of Mercer's ed
GLUCK, LE CHEVALIER DE CHRISTOPHER	18th	Germany	Composer	3.6	Burney. See Burney's History, Mercer's ed.
GOLDONI, CHARLES	18th	Italy	Playwright and opera librettist	2.4	Burney.
GORDON, MR	18th	England	Violinist	0.2	Burney See Burney's History, vol 2, pp 706, 723 of Mercer's ed. These references concern a singer and not a violinist.
GORDON [JOHN]	18th	England	Celist and impresario	0.4	Burney. Brother of the preceding. See Burney's History, vol 2, pp 870–871 of Mercer's ed
GOSSEC, FRANCOIS JOSEPH	18th-19th	France	Composer	0.3	Burney. See Burney's History, vol 2, p 977 of Mercer's ed. After Laborde.
GOUDIMEL, CLAUDE	16th	France	Composer	0.8	Burney. See Burney's History, Mercer's ed. Cross-referenced to FRANC, CLAUDE LE JEUNE and PALESTRINA
GRABUT, LOUIS	17th	France	Composer	0.4	Burney. See Burney's History, Mercer's ed, under heading Grabu.
GRAUN, CHARLES HENRY	18th	Germany	Composer	1.5	Burney. See Burney's History, Mercer's ed.
GRAUN, JOHN GOTTLIB	18th	Germany	Composer	0.3	Burney. Brother of the preceding
GRAZIANI, DOM BONAFACIO DA MARINO	17th	Italy	Choir master	0.3	Burney. See Burney's History, vol 2, pp 497, 606 of Mercer's ed.
GREBER, GIACOMO	18th	Italy	Musician	0.2	Burney. See Burney's History, Mercer's ed Cross-referenced to MARGARITA.
GREEN, [SAMUEL]	18th	England	Organ builder	0.2	Burney. Successor to Snetzler.
GREENE, MAURICE	18th	England	Organist and composer	3.5	Burney. See Burney's History, Mercer's ed. Cross-referenced to BONONCINI.
GREGORY I	1st	Italy	Pope	5.7	Burney probably wrote the last 2 paragraphs of this which deals with music. See Burney's History, Mercer's ed.

== Vol 17 Gretry-Hebe ==
Name	Century	Country	Occupation	Columns	Contributor/notes
GRETRY, ANDRE	18th	France	Composer of comic operas	7.2	Burney. See Burney's History, Mercer's ed. Cross-referenced to ENHARMONIC chord and LIEGE.
GUADAGNI, GAETANO	18th	Italy	Opera singer	2.2	Burney. See Burney's History, Mercer's ed.
GUADAGNI, SIGNORA	18th	Italy	Opera singer	0.3	Burney. Sister of the preceding. See Burney's History, Mercer's ed.
GUARDUCCI, TOMMASO	18th	Italy	Opera singer	1.5	Burney. See Burney's History, Mercer's ed.
GUGLIEMI, PIETRO	18th	Italy	Opera composer	0.4	Burney. See Burney's History, vol 2, pp 874, 876, of Mercer's ed.
GUILMAIN, GABRIEL	18th	France	Violinist	0.3	Burney. After Laborde.
HABENGTON, HENRY	15th	England	Musician	0.2	Burney. See Burney's History, vol 1, p 680, of Mercer's ed.
HAMBOIS, JOHN	14th	England	Musical writer	0.4	Burney. See Burney's History, Mercer's ed., under Hamboys. Cross-referenced to SIMON TURNSTEDE.
HAMMERSCHMIDT, ANDREAS	17th	Bohemia	Lutheran Church composer	0.1	Burney. See Burney's History, vol 2, p 457, of Mercer's ed.
HANDEL, GEORGE FREDERICK	17th-18th	Germany	Composer	10.8	Burney. See Burney's History, Mercer's ed. Cross-referenced to COMMEMORATION of Handel, OPERA, BONONCINO
HARMONIDES	Antiquity	Greece	Flute player	0.2	Burney. See Burney's History, Vol 1, p 298 of Mercer's ed.
HARRIS, JAMES	18th	England	Landowner and writer on music	1.2	Burney. He inaugurated the Salisbury music festival. Cross referenced to GRAMMAR
HARRIS, RENATUS [I] and [II]	17-18th	France	Organ Builders	1.0	Burney. See Burney's History Vol 2, p 344ff of Mercer's ed.
HASSE, JOHAN ADOLF	18th	Germany	Composer	1.5	Burney, See Burney's History, Mercer's ed. See Burney's Musical Tours, Scholes's ed.
HAUDIMONT, ABBE STEPHEN PETER	18th	France	Composer	3.4	Burney. Part translated from Laborde.
HAYDEN, GEORGE	18th	England	Composer and organist	0.2	Burney. See Burney's History Vol 2, p 997 of Mercer's ed.
HAYDN, JOSEPH	18th	Germany	Composer	2.1	Burney, See Burney's History, Mercer's ed. Cross-referenced to SPANISH Music, YRIATE, SONG.
HAYES, WILLIAM	18th	England	Organist and teacher	0.6	Burney.
HAYES, PHILIP	18th	England	Musician and teacher	0.2	Burney. Son of the preceding.
HAYM, NICOLA FRANCESCO	17th-18th	Italy	Musician, poet and antiquary	1.3	Burney. See Burney's History, Mercer's ed.
HEBDEN, JOHN	18th	England	Musician	0.2	Burney.
HENRY VIII	16th	England	King	4.8	0.5 columns by Burney relate to his musical interests. See Burney's History, Mercer's ed.
HERBST, JOHN ANDREAS	17th	Germany	Choir master and writer on music	0.4	Burney, based on Draudius and Walther.
HERODORUS	Antiquity	Greece	Trumpeter	0.4	Burney. See Burney's History, Mercer's ed.
HERSCHEL, JACOB	18th	Germany	Composer	0.2	Burney. See Burney's History, vol 2, p 961, Mercer's ed. Brother of the astronomer William Herschel.
HEYDEN, SEBALDUS	16th	Germany	Writer on music	0.1	Burney. See Burney's History, vol 2, p 203 of Mercer's ed.
HEYLANUS, PETRUS	16th	Holland	Composer	0.3	Burney. See Burney's History, vol 2, p 250 of Mercer's ed.

== Vol 18 Hibiscus-Increment ==
Name	Century	Country	Occupation	Columns	Contributor/notes
HICKFORD, JOHN	18th	England	Dancing master	0.3	Burney. See Burney's History, Mercer's ed. under Concert.
HILLER, [JOHN ADAM]	18th	Germany	Opera composer	0.1	Burney. See Burney's History, Mercer's ed. See Burney's Musical Tours, Scholes's ed.
HILTON, JOHN	16th & 17th	England	Composer	0.5	Burney. See Burney's History, Mercer's ed.
HOBRECHT, JACOB	16th	Holland	Composer	0.5	Burney. See Burney's History, Mercer's ed. under Obrecht.
HOFFMAN [sic], [LEOPOLD]	18th	Austrian?	Instrumental composer	0.1	Burney. Maestro di Capella of St Stephen's cathedral at Vienna in 1772. See Burney's Musical Tours, Scholes's ed.
HOGERIUS [OR OTGER]	8th?	Germany	Writer on music	0.6	Burney. See Burney's History, vol 1, p 432 of Mercer's ed. Cross-referenced to HUBALD and ODO.
HOLDEN, JOHN	18th	Scotland	Writer on music theory	1.3	Burney.
HOLDER, WILLIAM	17th	England	Writer on music theory	0.9	Burney. See Burney's History, Mercer's ed.
HOLINGSHED, RALPH	16th	England	Chronicler	0.3	Not by Burney, but from Biographia Britannica. See Burney's History, Mercer's ed.
HOLTZBAUER, [IGNAZ]	18th	Germany	Composer and singing master	0.2	Burney. See Burney's History, vol 2, p 945 of Mercer's ed.
HOOPER, EDMUND	17th	England	Organist	0.2	Burney. See Burney's History, Mercer's ed.
HOPKINS, JOHN	16th	England	Psalmodist	0.1	Burney. See Burney's History, Mercer's ed.
HOWARD, SAMUEL	18th	England	Composer	0.5	Burney. See Burney's History, vol 2, p 1014 of Mercer's ed.
HUBALD	8th-9th	Flanders	Monk and writer on music	0.7	Burney. See Burney's History, Mercer's ed., under Hucbald.
HUMPHREY, PELHAM	17th	England	Composer	0.6	Burney. See Burney's History, Mercer's ed.
HUMPHRIES, JOHN	18th	England	Composer	0.4	Burney.
HUNT, ARABELLA	17th	England	Singer	1.0	Burney. See Burney's History, vol 2, p 123 of Mercer's ed.
HYPPOMACHUS	Antiquity	Greece	Flautist	0.1	Burney.
JACKSON, WILLIAM	18th	England	Organist and composer	1.1	Burney. See Burney's History, vol 2, p 1016 of Mercer's ed.
JAMES I	14th	Scotland	King of Scotland	2.4	Burney. It is concluded by paragraphs (1.2 col) about his musical gifts. See Burney's History, vol 2, p 178-179 of Mercer's ed. Cross-referenced to OSSIAN.
JAMES I	17th	England	King of England	3.5	The final section (0.4 col) relates to music in his reign. Burney. See Burney's History, Mercer's ed.
JAMES II	17th	England	King of England	3.3	The final section (0.4 col) relates to music in his reign. Burney. See Burney's History, Mercer's ed.
JANSONS, MESSRS	18th	France	Cellists	0.2	Burney after Laborde.
JARNOWICH, ----	18th-19th	France	Violinist	0.9	Burney after Laborde. Giovanni Mane Giornovich (1735-1804)
IBYCUS	Antiquity	Greece	Poet and musician	0.4	Burney. Burney. See Burney's History, Mercer's ed. under Sam Buca.
JEACOCK, SAMUEL	18th	England	Baker	0.4	Burney. Jeacock was included due to his ability to play the changes of a ring of 10 bells on the harpsichord. Cross-referenced to BELLS and CHANGES.
JELIOTTE [Pierre]	18th	France	Singer	0.3	Burney after Laborde.
JENKINS, JOHN	17th	England	Composer	1.5	Burney. See Burney's History, vol 2, p 233-3 of Mercer's ed.
JERMOLI	18th	Italy	Singer	0.1	Burney. See Burney's History, Mercer's ed.
JHONSON [SIC = JOHNSON], ROBERT	16th	England	Composer	0.1	Burney. See Burney's History, vol 1, p 795 of Mercer's ed.
IMMYNS, JOHN	18th	England	Lutenist	0.4	Burney.

== Vol 19 Increments-Kilmes ==
Name	Century	Country	Occupation	Columns	Contributor/notes
JOMELLI, NICOLO	18th	Italy	Composer	4.6	Burney. See Burney's History, Mercer's ed. and Burney's Musical Tours, Scholes's ed.
JONES, ----	18th	Wales	Harpist	0.5	Burney.
JONES, JOHN	18th	England	Organist	0.2	Burney.
JORTIN, JOHN	18th	England	Cleric and writer on music	2.0	Not likely to be written by Burney, but mentions his writings on music. Burney. See Burney's History, Mercer's ed.
JOSQUIN DES PREZ	16th	Holland	Composer	4.5	Burney. See Burney's History, Mercer's ed.
JOURNET, FRANÇAISE	18th	France	Opera singer	0.2	Burney after Laborde.
JOZZI, GIUSEPPI	18th	Italy	Opera singer	0.2	Burney. See Burney's History, Mercer's ed.
ISAAC, HENRY	15th	Germany	Composer	0.2	Burney. See Burney's History, Mercer's ed.
ISMANIAS	Antiquity	Greece	Flautist	0.8	Burney.
ISNARI, [PAOLO]	16th	Italy	Singer and composer	0.2	Burney after Laborde.
IVES, SIMON	17th	England	Singing master	0.4	Burney.
JULIAN, FLAVIUS CLAUDIUS JULIANUS	1st	Italy	Emperor	3.1	The article concludes with a (0.4 col) account of an organ he constructed. Burney. See Burney's History, Vol 1 pp 453–454 of Mercer's ed.
JUST [JOHANN AUGUST]	18th	Holland	Composer	3 lines	Burney.
KAPSBERGER, JOHANNES HIERONIMUS	17th	Germany	Composer	0.4	Burney. See Burney's History, Mercer's ed.
KEEBLE, JOHN	18th	England	Organist	0.3	Burney. See Burney's History, Mercer's ed. Cross-referenced to ROSEINGRAVE
KIERLEBERUS, JOHN GEORGE	17th	Germany	Composer	0.2	Burney. See Burney's History, vol 2, p 459 of Mercer's ed.
KEISER, REINHARD	17th-18th	Germany	Composer	0.9	Burney. See Burney's History, Mercer's ed. and Burney's Musical Tours, Scholes's ed.
KELLY, EARL OF	18th	Ireland	Violinist	0.4	Burney. See Burney's History, vol 2, pp 1018, 1020, of Mercer's ed.
KELNER, ---	18th	Germany	Double Bass player	0.2	Burney. See Burney's History, vol 2, p 989 of Mercer's ed. Cross-referenced to PEPSUCH and Musical LIBRARY
KELWAY, JOSEPH	18th	England	Organist	0.8	Burney. See Burney's History, Mercer's ed.

== Vol 20 Kiln-Light ==
Name	Century	Country	Occupation	Columns	Contributor/notes
KING OF PRUSSIA, FREDERICK	18th	Prussia	King	0.5	Burney. See Burney's History, vol 2, p 961ff of Mercer's ed.
KING, CHARLES	18th	England	Organist	0.5	Burney, after Hawkins.
KING, WILLIAM	17th	England	Organist	0.1	Burney.
KING, ROBERT	17th-18th	England	Composer	0.1	Burney.
KIRBYE, GEORGE	16th-27th	England	Madrigalist	0.2	Burney. See Burney's History, vol 2, p 52, 106 of Mercer's ed.
KIRCHER, ANATHASEUS	17th	Italy	Mathematician and Philosopher	1.2	About half of the article is after Moreri, and (0.9 col) is by Burney. See Burney's History, Mercer's ed and Burney's Musical Tours, Scholes's ed.
KIRCKMAN, JACOB	18th	Germany	Harpsichord maker	1.1	Burney. Cross-referenced to GUITAR.
KIRNBERGER, JOHN PHILIP	18th	Germany	Composer	0.7	Burney. See Burney's Musical Tours, Scholes's ed.
KOZELUCH, JOHN ANTHONY	18th	Germany	Composer	0.2	Burney.
KOZELUCH, LEOPOLD	18th	Austrian	Composer	0.7	Burney. See Burney's History, vol 2, p 960 of Mercer's ed. Cousin of the preceding.
KUHNAU, JOHANN	17th-18th	Germany	Composer and organist	0.5	Burney. See Burney's History, vol 2, p 458 of Mercer's ed.
KUNZEN, ADOLPH CARL	18th	Germany	Harpsichirdist and organist	0.2	Burney. See Burney's History, vol 2, p 999 of Mercer's ed.
LABORDE, JEAN-BENJAMIN DE	18th	France	Writer on music	1.1	Burney. Burney. See Burney's History, Mercer's ed. under De la Borde
LALANDE, JOSEPH JEROME LE FRANÇAIS	18th-19th	France	Astronomer	2.0	Not by Burney, but see Burney's Musical Tours, Scholes's ed. for references to Lalande's Travels to Italy (1769).
LALANDE, MICHEL RICHARD DE	17th-18th	France	Musician	0.3	Burney. Burney's Musical Tours, Scholes's ed.
LAMBERT, MICHEL	17th	France	Singing master and composer	0.2	Burney. See Burney's History, Mercer's ed.
LAMIA	Antiquity	Greece	Flute player	1.0	Burney. Burney. See Burney's History, vol 1, pp 333–334 of Mercer's ed.
LA MOTTE, ----	18th	Austria	Violinist	0.2	See Burney's Musical Tours, Scholes's ed.
LAMPE, FREDERICUS ADOLPHUS	17th-18th	Germany	Writer on music	0.5	Burney.
LAMPE, JOHN FREDERIC	18th	Germany	Composer	1.0	Burney. See Burney's History, Mercer's ed.
LAMPON	Antiquity	Greece	Musician	0.2	Burney.
LAMPUGNANI, JOHN BAPTIST	18th	Italy	Opera composer	0.8	Burney. See Burney's History, Mercer's ed. See Burney's Musical Tours, Scholes's ed.
LANIERE, NICOLO	17th	Italy	Composer	0.8	Burney. See Burney's History, Mercer's ed.
LASCHI, FILIPPO	18th	Italy	Opera singer	0.3	Burney. See Burney's History, Mercer's ed.
LASSUS, ORLANDUS	16th	Belgian	Composer	3.0	Burney. See Burney's History, Mercer's ed. under Lasso.
LASUS	Antiquity	Greece	Writer on music	0.6	Burney. See Burney's History, Mercer's ed.
LATILLA, GAETANO	18th	Italy	Opera composer	0.3	Burney. See Burney's History, Mercer's ed. See Burney's Musical Tours, Scholes's ed.
L'AUGIER, MONSIGNOR	18th	France	Physician and musical dilettante	0.9	Burney. See Burney's Musical Tours, Scholes's ed.
LAWES, WILLIAM	17th	England	Composer	1.1	Burney. See Burney's History, Mercer's ed.
LAWES, HENRY	17th	England	Composer	2.6	Burney. See Burney's History, Mercer's ed. Brother of the preceding. With example of notation.
LEGRENZI, DON GIOVANNI	17th	Italy	Composer	0.4	Burney. See Burney's History, Mercer's ed.
LENTON, JOHN	17th-18th	England	Flautist	0.2	Burney.
LEONARDO LEO	18th	Italy	Organist	1.1	Burney. See Burney's History, vol 2, pp 914–915 of Mercer's ed.
LEOPOLD II	18th	Germany	Emperor of Germany	0.9	Has a concluding paragraph (0.1 col) about his musical taste. Burney. See Burney's Musical Tours, Scholes's ed
LEVERIDGE, RICHARD	17th-18th	England	Composer	0.4	Burney. See Burney's History, Mercer's ed.
LIBERATI, ANTIMO	17th	Italy	Singer and composer	0.4	Burney. See Burney's History, Mercer's ed.
LIDL, [ANDREAS]	18th	Germany	Viol da Gambist	0.4	Burney. See Burney's History, vol 2, p 1020 of Mercer's ed.

== Vol 21 Lighthouse-Machinery (part) ==
Name	Century	Country	Occupation	Columns	Contributor/notes
LIGNEVILLE, MARCHESE DI	18th	Italy	Dilettante and Composer	0.2	Burney. See Burney's Musical Tours, Scholes's ed
LINLEY, JOHN	18th	England	Singing master and organist	0.8	Burney. See Burney's History, Mercer's ed. He was the father of Thomas Linley the elder.
LINUS	Antiquity	Greece	Musician	1.5	Burney. See Burney's History, Mercer's ed.
LOBKOWITZ, PRINCE FERDINAND PHILIP	18th	Bohemia	Composer	0.2	Burney. See Burney's History, Mercer's ed.
LOCATELLI, PIETRO	18th	Italy	Violinist	0.5	Burney. See Burney's History, Mercer's ed.
LOCK, MATTHEW	17th	England	Organist	2.4	Burney. See Burney's History, Mercer's ed. under Locke
LOLLI, [ANTONIO]	18th	France	Violinist	0.3	Burney. See Burney's History, vol 2, p 1020ff of Mercer's ed.
LORETI, VITTORII	17th	Italy	Singer	0.1	Burney. See Burney's History, Mercer's ed. under Loreto. Cross-referenced to ARIE a Cantate da Camera.
LOTTI, ANTONIO	17th-18th	Italy	Organist	0.8	Burney. See Burney's History, Mercer's ed. See Burney's Musical Tours, Scholes's ed. Cross-referenced to BONONCINI.
LOUIS XIII	17th	France	King of France	0.6	Burney.
LOUIS XIV	17th	France	King of France	0.8	Burney. See Burney's History, Mercer's ed.
LOULIE, FRANÇOIS [sic =ÉTIENNE]	17th	France	Writer on music	0.2	Burney. Cross-referenced to TRANSPOSITION.
LOW, EDWARD	17th	England	Organist	0.5	Burney. See Burney's History, Mercer's ed. under Lowe.
LOW, THOMAS	18th	England	Singer	0.3	Burney. See Burney's History, vol 2, pp 1010–1011 of Mercer's ed.
LUCCHESI, ANDREA	18th	Italy	Composer	0.2	Burney. See Burney's Musical Tours, Scholes's ed
LUIGI ROSSI	17th	Italy	Composer	0.5	Burney. See Burney's History, Mercer's ed. under Rossi. Wrongly alphabetised here. Should be under R.
LUINI, BONETTO	18th	Italy	Singer	0.1	Burney.
LULLI, JOHN BAPTIST DE	17th	Italy	Composer	2.0	Burney. See Burney's History, Mercer's ed.
LUSCINIUS, OTTOMARUS	16th	Germany	Writer on music	0.5	Burney. See Burney's History, Mercer's ed.
LUSTIG, JACOB WILHELM	18th	Germany	Organist and composer	0.3	Burney.
LUTHER, MARTIN	16th	Germany	Theologian and Reformer	21.6	The piece concludes with (1 col) by Burney about Luther and music. See Burney's History, Mercer's ed.
MACE, THOMAS	17th	England	Writer on music	1.9	Burney. See Burney's History, vol 2, p 376-378 of Mercer's ed.
MACHAU, GUILLAUME	13th-14th	France	Poet and musician	1.2	Burney. See Burney's History, vol 1, p 614ff of Mercer's ed.

== Vol 22 Machinery(part)-Mattheson ==
Name	Century	Country	Occupation	Columns	Contributor/notes
MAJO, FRANCIS	18th	Italy	Composer	1.5	Burney. See Burney's History, vol 2, p 869 of Mercer's ed.
MAIRE, LE	17th	France	Musician	0.2	Burney. See Burney's History, Mercer's ed.
MALCOLM, ALEXANDER	18th	Scotland	Writer on music	1.6	Burney.
MANZOLI, GIOVANNI	18th	Italy	Opera singer	0.7	Burney. See Burney's History, Mercer's ed.
MARA, MADAM [GERTRUD ELISABETH]	18th-19th	Germany	Singer and musician	3.0	Burney. See Burney's History, Mercer's ed. See Burney's Musical Tours, Scholes's ed under Schmeling, her maiden name.
MARBECK, JOHN	16th	England	Organist	0.3	Burney. See Burney's History, Mercer's ed. under Merbecke. Cross-referenced to MUSIC A CAPELLA and CHANTING.
MARCHAND, JOHN LEWIS	17th-18th	France	Organist	0.4	Burney. See Burney's History, Mercer's ed.
MARCHESI, LUIGI	18th	Italy	Singer	1.2	Burney. See Burney's History, Mercer's ed.
MARCHETTI, LA	18th	Italy	Singer	0.2	Burney.
MARCHETTO DA PADOVA	13th	Italy	writer on music	0.5	Burney. See Burney's History, Mercer's ed.
MARCHETTO CARA	16th	Italy	Singer	0.7	Burney. Wrongly placed here. Should be under 'C'.
MARENZIO, LUCA	16th	Italy	Madrigalist	2.1	Burney. See Burney's History, Mercer's ed.
MARGARITA, FRANCESCA, DE L'EPINE	18th	Italy	Singer	2.1	Burney. See Burney's History, Mercer's ed. under Epine.
MARIN, FABRICE	16th	France	Composer	4 lines	Burney.
MARIN, MONSIEUR	18th	France	Harp virtuoso	0.5	Burney.
MARMONTEL, JOHN FRANCIS	18th	France	Encyclopaedist and writer on music	4.3	Burney. See Burney's History, vol 2, p 980 of Mercer's ed. and see Burney's Musical Tours, Scholes's ed
MARPBURG, FREDERIC WILHELM	18th	Germany	Composer and writer on music	1.0	Burney. See Burney's History, Mercer's ed.
MARTINI, FR. GIAMBATISTA	18th	Italy	Writer on music	3.6	Burney. See Burney's History, Mercer's ed. Cross-referenced to PROGRESSION and PROPORTION
MARTINI, GIUSEPPI SAN	18th	Italy	Hautbois virtuoso and composer	0.9	Burney. See Burney's History, vol 2, p 405 of Mercer's ed.
MARTINI, GIOVANNI BATISTA SAN	18th	Italy	Composer	0.5	Burney. Brother of the preceding.
MARTINI, ABATE [GIOVANNI]	18th	Italy	Musician and critic	0.3	Burney. See Burney's Musical Tours, Scholes's ed. Cross-referenced to MUSIC of the Greek Church and Russian MUSIC
MARTINI of MADRID	?18th	?Italy	Opera composer	0.1	Burney.
MASON, WILLIAM	18th	England	Poet and musical critic	1.9	The article concludes with a (0.9) column account of his musical activities by Burney. See Burney's History, Mercer's ed
MASSON, MON.	17th-18th	France	Musician and writer	0.1	Burney. See Burney's History, vol 2, p 978 of Mercer's ed.
MATTEIS, NICOLA	17th	Italy	Violinist	2.2	Burney. See Burney's History, vol 2, p 407-409 of Mercer's ed.
MATTEUCCI, IL CAVALIERE	18th	Italy	Singer	0.1	Burney.
MATTHESON, JOHN	17th-18th	Germany	Musician	2.2	Burney. See Burney's History, vol 1, p 432 of Mercer's ed., and See Burney's Musical Tours, Scholes's ed. Cross-referenced to PERE CASTEL and CLAVECIN OCULAIRE.

== Vol 23 Matthew-Monsoon ==
Name	Century	Country	Occupation	Columns	Contributor/notes
MAUDUIT, JACQUES	16th	France	Musician	1.1	Burney. See Burney's History, vol 2, p 233-234 Mercer's ed.
MAUPIN, LA [JULIE D'AUBIGNY]	17th-18th	France	Singer	1.0	Burney. See Burney's History, vol 2, p 470ff of Mercer's ed.
MAURE, CATHERINE-NICOLE LE	18th	France	Opera singer	0.9	Burney, after Laborde.
MAZZANTI, FERDINANDO	18th	Italy	Opera singer and composer	0.6	Burney. See Burney's Musical Tours, Scholes's ed
MAZZOCCHI, DOMENICO AND VIRGILIO	17th	Italy	Composers and musicians	0.9	Burney. See Burney's History, Mercer's ed.
MEL, GAUDIO FLAMINGO	16th	Belgium	Musician	0.2	Burney. Maybe a relative of Rinaldo del Mel. Cross-referenced to PALESTRINA.
MELAMPUS	Antiquity	Greece	Physician	0.3	Burney. See Burney's History, vol 1, p 270 of Mercer's ed.
MERIGHI, LA SIGNORA	18th	Italy	Singer	0.1	Burney. See Burney's History, Mercer's ed.
MERSENNE, MARIN	16th-17th	France	Mathematician and philosopher	2.2	Concludes with a (1.3 col) section by Burney about his musical writings. Burney. See Burney's History, Mercer's ed. under Mersennus.
MERULA DA CORREGGIO, CLAUDIO	16th	Italy	Organist	0.2	Burney. See Burney's History, Mercer's ed.
MERULA, TARQUINIO	16th	Italy	Composer	0.7	Burney. See Burney's History, Mercer's ed. Includes example of notation.
METASTASIO, L'ABATE PIETRO	18th	Italy	Poet and opera lyricist	17.9	Burney. See Burney's History, Mercer's ed.
MIGLIAVACCA, GIOVANNI AMBROSIO	18th	Italy	Poet and librettist	0.1	Burney.
MILLEVILLE, ALESSANDRO	17th	Italy	Organist and composer	0.1	Burney after Walther, Musicalisches Lexicon (1732). See Burney's History, vol 2, p 447 of Mercer's ed.
MINELLI, ANDREA	17th-18th	Italy	Opera librettist	0.1	Burney
MINGOTTI, REGINA	18th	Austria	Opera singer	3.5	Burney. See Burney's History, Mercer's ed. and see Burney's Musical Tours, Scholes's ed
MISLIWECZEK, JOSEPH	18th	Bohemia	Composer	0.6	Burney. See Burney's History, vol 2, p 946 of Mercer's ed.
MITZLER, LORENZ CHRISTOPH	18th	Germany	Writer on music	0.3	Burney. See Burney's History, vol 2, p 948 of Mercer's ed.
MONDONVILLE, JOHN JOSEPH CASSANEA DE	18th	France	Musician	0.4	Burney, after Laborde. See Burney's History, Mercer's ed.
MONSIGNI, [PIERRE-ALEXANDRE]	17th-18th	France	Opera librettist	0.3	Burney. See Burney's History, Mercer's ed.

== Vol 24 Monster - Newton-in-the-Willows ==
Name	Century	Country	Occupation	Columns	Contributor/notes
MONTAGNANA, ANTONIO	18th	Italy	Opera singer	0.2	Burney. See Burney's History, Mercer's ed.
MONTANARI	18th	Italy	Violinist	0.2	Burney. See Burney's History, vol 2, p 447 of Mercer's ed.
MONTECLAIRE, MICHEL DE	France	18th	Musician	0.1	Burney. See Burney's History, vol 1, p 964 of Mercer's ed.
MONTEVERDE, CLAUDIO	16th-17th	Italy	Composer	0.6	Burney. See Burney's History, Mercer's ed.
MONTICELLI, ANGELO MARIA	18th	Italy	Opera singer	0.1	Burney. See Burney's History, Mercer's ed. and see Burney's Musical Tours, Scholes's ed
MONZA, [CARLO]	18th	Italy	Opera composer	1.0	Burney. See Burney's Musical Tours, Scholes's ed
MORALES, CRISTOFERO	16th	Spain	Composer	0.4	Burney. See Burney's History, Mercer's ed.
MOREAU, LA DEMOISELLE FANCHON	17th	France	Opera singer	0.2	Burney.
MORELET, ABBÉ [ANDRÉ]	18th	France	Writer on music	1.0	Burney, after Laborde. See Burney's History, vol 2, p 979 of Mercer's ed.
MORELLI, GIOVANNI	18th	Italy	Opera singer	0.2	Burney.
MORIGI, ANDREA	18th	Italy	Opera singer	0.2	Burney. See Burney's History, Mercer's ed.
MORLEY, THOMAS	16th-17th	England	Writer on music	4.5	Burney. See Burney's History, Mercer's ed.
MORTELLARI, MICHELE	18th	Italy	Composer and singer	0.5	Burney. See Burney's History, vol 2, p 899 of Mercer's ed.
MOSES, J. GOTTFRIED	18th	Germany	Musician	0.1	Burney.
MOURET, JOHN JOSEPH	17th	France	Musician	0.5	Burney. See Burney's History, vol 2, p 964 of Mercer's ed.
MOZART, LEOPOLD	18th	Germany	Musician	0.3	Burney. See Burney's History, Mercer's ed.
MOZART, JOHN CHRYSOSTOM WOLFGAN THEOPHILUS	18th	Germany	Composer	1.7	Burney. See Burney's History, Mercer's ed. and see Burney's Musical Tours, Scholes's ed
MUNDY, JOHN	16th-17th	England	Organist	0.1	Burney. See Burney's History, Mercer's ed.
MUSET, COLIN	14th	France	Jongleur	0.2	Burney.
MÜTHEL, JOHANN GODFRIED	18th	Germany	Composer	2.0	Burney. See Burney's Musical Tours, Scholes's ed.
MYRTIS	Antiquity	Greece	Poet	0.4	Burney. See Burney's History, vol 1, p 312 of Mercer's ed.
NANINO, GIOVANNI MARIA DA VALERANO	16th-17th	Italy	Singer and composer	0.6	Burney. See Burney's History, Mercer's ed.
NANINO, BERNARDINO	16th-17th	Italy	Composer	0.1	Burney. See Burney's History, Mercer's ed. Younger brother of the preceding.
NARDINI, PIETRO	18th	Italy	Violinist and composer	0.2	Burney. See Burney's History, Mercer's ed. and see Burney's Musical Tours, Scholes's ed
NARES, JAMES	18th	England	Organist and composer	0.2	Burney. See Burney's History, vol 2, p 494 of Mercer's ed.
NASSARE, PABLO DE ZARAGOÇA	17th-18th	Spain	Organist and writer on music	0.4	Burney.
NAUMANN, JOHANN AMADEUS	18th	Germany	Choir master	0.1	Burney. See Burney's History, Mercer's ed.
NEGRI, DON FRANCESCO	17th	Italy	Musician	0.1	Burney.
NERO	1st	Italy	Emperor	4.3	Burney. See Burney's History, Mercer's ed. Part (1.2 cols) discusses Nero's musical attainments.

== Vol 25 Newtonian Philosophy-Ozunusze ==
Name	Century	Country	Occupation	Columns	Contributor/notes
NICOLINO, GRIMALDI	17th-18th	Italy	Singer	1.5	Burney. See Burney's History, Mercer's ed. under Nicolini. This entry is misplaced in the alphabet. Should be Nicolo Grimaldi.
NORTH, FRANCIS, LORD KEEPER	17th	England	Lawyer and writer on music	1.3	Burney. See Burney's History, Mercer's ed.
NORTH, ROGER	17th	England	Lawyer and writer on music	0.4	Burney. See Burney's History, Mercer's ed. Brother of the preceding. Cross-referenced to JENKINS and NICOLA MATTEIS
OCKENHEIM	15th	Holland	Composer	1.1	Burney. See Burney's History, Mercer's ed. under Okenheim.
ODINGTON, WALTER	14th	England	Writer on music	3.4	Burney. See Burney's History, Mercer's ed.
ODO OF CLUNY	10th	France	Writer on music	2.3	Burney. See Burney's History, Mercer's ed.
ORGITANO, Paolo	18th	Italy	Harpsichordist	0.1	Burney. See Burney's Musical Tours, Scholes's ed.
ORISICCHIO, ANTONIO	18th	Italy	Composer	0.1	Burney. See Burney's Travels, Scholes's ed.
ORLANDO DI LASSO	16th	Belgium	Musician	1.2	Burney. See Burney's History, Mercer's ed. under Lasso.
ORNITHOPARCHUS, ANDREAS	16th	Germany	Writer on music	0.3	Burney. See Burney's History, Mercer's ed.
ORPHEUS	Antiquity	Greece	Poet and musician	6.8	Burney. See Burney's History, Mercer's ed.
ORSINI, GAETANO	18th	Italy	Singer	0.2	Burney. See Burney's Travels, Scholes's ed.
OSIO, TEODATA	Italy	17th	Writer on music	0.4	Burney

== Vol 26 P-Perturbation ==
Name	Century	Country	Occupation	Columns	Contributor/notes
PACCHIEROTTI, GASPARO	18th	Italy	Singer	2.5	Burney. See Burney's History, Mercer's ed.
PACHELBET [sic]	17th	Germany	Composer	0.1	Burney. See Burney's History, Mercer's ed.
PAESIELLO, GIOVANNI	18th	Italy	Opera composer	1.0	Burney. See Burney's History, Mercer's ed. and see Burney's Musical Tours, Scholes's ed
PAGANINI, LA	18th	Italy	Singer	0.4	Burney. See Burney's History, Mercer's ed.
PAGIN, [ANDRÉ NOEL]	18th	France	Violinist	0.1	Burney. See Burney's Musical Tours, Scholes's ed
PAITA, GIOVANNI	18th	Italy	Singer	0.1	Burney.
PALESTRINA, GIOVANNI PIERLUIGI DA	16th-17th	Italy	Composer	3.6	Burney. See Burney's History, Mercer's ed. and see Burney's Musical Tours, Scholes's ed
PALMA, FILIPPO	18th	Italy	Singer	0.7	Burney.
PALSCHAU, JOHANN GOTTFRIED WILHELM	18th-19th	Germany	Composer	1.1	Burney. See Burney's History, vol 2, p 97 of Mercer's ed. under Palscha
PAOLO, AGOSTINO	16th-17th	Italy	Composer	0.3	Burney. See Burney's History, vol 2, p 414-415 of Mercer's ed. Wrongly alphabetised. Should be Paolo Agostino.
PARABOSCO, GIRALOMO	16th	Italy	Organist	0.5	Burney. See Burney's History, vol 2, p 135, note x of Mercer's ed.
PARADIES, DOMENICO	18th	Italy	Composer	0.4	Burney. See Burney's History, Mercer's ed.
PARADIS [MARIA] THERES[I]A	18th-19th	Germany	Blind musician	2.5	Burney. See Burney's History, Mercer's ed.
PARSONS, ROBERT	16th	England	Composer	0.2	Burney. See Burney's History, Mercer's ed.
PASI, ANTONIO	18th	Italy	Singer	0.3	Burney.
PASQUALI, NICOLO	18th	Italy	Violinist	0.3	Burney. See Burney's History, Mercer's ed.
PASQUILINI, SIGNOR	18th	Italy	Cellist	0.2	Burney. See Burney's Musical Tours, Scholes's ed. p 76, where Burney describes him as a violinist.
PASQUINO, ERCOLE AND BERNARDO	17th	Italy	Organists	0.1	Burney. See Burney's History, Mercer's ed. They were father and son.
PEACHAM, HENRY	17th	England	Writer in music	0.4	Burney. See Burney's History, Mercer's ed.
PELEGRINI, VALERIO	17th-18th	Spain	Singer	2 lines	Burney.
PELEGRINI, PIETRO	18th	Italy	Organist and composer	0.2	Burney.
PELEGRINI, FERDINANDO	18th	Italy	Harpsichordist and composer	0.2	Burney.
PENLLYN, WILLIAM	16th	Wales	Harpist	0.1	Burney. See Burney's History, vol 1, p 484 note p of Mercer's ed.
PEPUSCH, JOHN CHRISTOPHER	17th-18th	Germany	Musician and writer on music	3.0	Burney. See Burney's History, vol 2, pp 985–989 of Mercer's ed. Cross-referenced to COUNTERPOINT.
PEREZ, DAVID	18th	Spain	Composer	1.4	Burney. See Burney's History, Mercer's ed.
PERGOLESI, GIOVAN BATTISTA	18th	Italy	Composer	3.6	Burney. See Burney's History, vol 2, pp 919–924 of Mercer's ed.
PERI, JACOBO	16th-17th	Italy	Composer	0.2	Burney. See Burney's History, Mercer's ed.
PERTI, GIOVANNI ANTONIO	17th-18th	Italy	Composer	0.2	Burney. See Burney's History, vol 2, p 536 of Mercer's ed.

== Vol 27 Pertussis-Poetics ==
Name	Century	Country	Occupation	Columns	Contributor/notes
PHILADOR, ANDRÉ	18th	France	Composer	1.3	Burney after Laborde. See Burney's History, Mercer's ed.
PICCINI, NICOLA	18th	Italy	Composer	2.2	Burney. See Burney's History, Mercer's ed. and see Burney's Musical Tours, Scholes's ed
PICCININI, ALESSANDRO	16th	Italy	Lutenist and writer on music	0.1	Burney
PICCITONO, PADRE ANGELO DA	16th	Italy	Writer on music	5 lines	Burney.
PIFENDEL [sic] [JOHANN GEORGE]	18th	?	Violinist	0.3	Burney, after Quantz. Should be Pisendel.
PINTO, THOMAS	18th	England	Violinist	1.1	Burney. See Burney's History, Mercer's ed.
PIOZZI, SIGNOR [GABRIEL MARIA]	18th-19th	Italy	Singer	0.3	Burney. See Burney's History, Mercer's ed. This is noted as being written in 1814, the year of Burney's death.
PISTOCCHI, FRANCESE-ANTONIO	17th-18th	Italy	Singer	0.5	Burney. See Burney's History, Mercer's ed. and See Burney's Musical Tours, Scholes's ed
PLATO	Antiquity	Greece	Philosopher	1.7	The conclusion (1.0 col) is by Burney about Plato and music. See Burney's History, Mercer's ed.
PLAYFORD JOHN	17th-18th	England	Music publisher	0.7	Burney. See Burney's History, Mercer's ed.
PLAYFORD, HENRY	17th-18th	England	Music publisher	0.4	Burney. See Burney's History, Mercer's ed. Son of the preceding.
PLUTARCH	1st-2nd	Italy	Biographer	2.3	The conclusion (1.3 col) is by Burney about Plutarch and music, after Burette. See Burney's History, Mercer's ed.

== Vol 28 Poetry-Punjoor ==
Name	Century	Country	Occupation	Columns	Contributor/notes
POLITIANO, ANGELO	15th	Italy	Writer and poet	2.0	Burney. See Burney's History, Mercer's ed.
POLLAROLI, CARLO FRANCESCO	17th-18th	Italy	Composer	0.1	Burney. See Burney's History, Mercer's ed.
PORPORA, NICOLA	18th	Italy	Composer and singing master	0.8	Burney. See Burney's History, Mercer's ed. and see Burney' Musical Tours, Scholes's ed
PORPORINO, ANTONIO UBERTO	18th	Italy	Singer	0.1	Burney.
PORSILE, GIUSEPPE	17th-18th	Italy	Composer	0.2	Burney. See Burney's History, Mercer's ed.
PORTA, CONSTANZO	16th	Italy	Composer	0.7	Burney. See Burney's History, Mercer's ed.
PORTA, GIOVANNI	18th	Italy	Composer	0.1	Burney. See Burney's History, Mercer's ed.
POTENZA, PASQUALE	18th	Italy	Opera singer	0.1	Burney. See Burney's History, Mercer's ed.
POTHOLT, JACOB	18th	Holland	Organist and carillonneur	0.7	Burney. See Burney's Musical Tours, Scholes's ed., under Pothoff.
POWER, LIONEL	15th	England	Composer	1.0	Burney. See Burney's History, Mercer's ed.
PRAETORIUS, MICHAEL	16th-17th	Germany	Writer on music and composer	0.4	Burney. See Burney's History, Mercer's ed.
PREDIERE, LUC ANTONIO	18th	Austria	Composer	0.2	Burney. See Burney's History, Mercer's ed.
PRICE, JOHN	17th	England	Flautist	4 lines	Burney.
PRIMAVERA, GIO[VANNI] LEONARDO	16th	Italy	Composer	3 lines	Burney.
PRINTZ, WOLFGANG GASPAR	16th	Germany	Writer on music	0.6	Burney. See Burney's History, Mercer's ed.
PTOLOMY, AULETES	Antiquity	Egypt	Ruler of Egypt	0.7	Burney. See Burney's History, Mercer's ed.
PTOLOMY, CLAUDIUS	1st	Egypt	Writer on Music	4.5	Burney. See Burney's History, Mercer's ed. Includes example of notation.

== Vol 29 Punishment-Repton ==
Name	Century	Country	Occupation	Columns	Contributor/notes
PURCELL, HENRY	17th	England	Composer	11.4	Burney. See Burney's History, Mercer's ed.
PUY, MADEMOISELLE DU	18th	France	Harpist	0.3	Burney? after Laborde
PYTHAGORAS	Antiquity	Greece	Writer on music	4.8	Burney. See Burney's History, Mercer's ed. with perhaps additions by Farey sr.
QUAGLIATI	17th	Italy	Music-master	0.2	Burney. See Burney's History, Mercer's ed. Cross-referenced to OPERA, RECETATIVE, and PIETRO DELLA VALLE.
QUANTZ, JOHN JOACHIM	18th	Germany	Musician	5.3	Burney. See Burney's History, Mercer's ed. and see Burney's Musical Tours, Scholes's ed.
QUEEN CAROLINE [OF ANSPACH]	17th-18th	Germany	Wife of George I	0.2	Burney.
QUEEN MARY I	16th	England	Queen of England	0.6	Burney. See Burney's History, Mercer's ed.
QUEEN ELIZABETH	16th	England	Queen of England	3.5	Burney. See Burney's History, Mercer's ed.
QUEEN MARY II	17th	England	Co-Regent of England	4 lines	Burney. See Burney's History, Mercer's ed.
QUILICI, GAETANO	18th	Italy	Singer	0.2	Burney. See Burney's History, Mercer's ed.
QUIN, DR	18th	Ireland	Physician	0.3	Burney.
QUIN, JAMES	17th-18th	England	Actor	0.8	Burney. See Burney's History, Mercer's ed.
QUINAULT, PHILIP	17th	France	Opera librettist	2.4	Burney. See Burney's History, Mercer's ed.
RAAF, ANTHONY	18th	Germany	Singer	0.4	Burney. See Burney's History, Mercer's ed.
RAIMONDI, IGNATIUS	18th	Italy	Violinist and composer	0.2	Burney. See Burney's History, Mercer's ed.
RAMEAU, JOHN PHILIP	17th-18th	France	Opera composer	2.1	Burney. See Burney's History, Mercer's ed. and see Burney's Musical Tours, Scholes's ed. Cross-referenced to BASE, BASSE Fondementale and COUNTERPOINT.
RAMIS, BARTOLOMEO	15th	Spain	Writer on music	0.5	Burney. See Burney's History, Mercer's ed.
RAMONDON, LEWIS	17th-18th	England	Singer and writer on music	0.2	Burney. See Burney's History, Mercer's ed.
RANDAL (sic), JOHN	18th	England	Professor of Music	0.4	Burney.
RAVENSCROFT, THOMAS	17th	England	Musician and Publisher	1.2	Burney. See Burney's History, Mercer's ed.
RAVENSCROFT, JOHN	17th-18th	England	Violinist and composer	0.2	Burney.
RAULT, FELIX	18th	France	Flautist	0.3	Burney, after Laborde.
RAUZZINI, VENAZIO	18th	Italy	Singer	0.6	Burney. See Burney's History, Mercer's ed.
READING, JOHN	18th	England	Organist	0.2	Burney. See Burney's History, Mercer's ed.
REBEL, JEAN-FERRY, SR.	17th-18th	France	Violinist and composer	0.1	Burney. See Burney's History, Mercer's ed.
REBEL, FRANÇOIS	18th	France	Band master and opera conductor	0.4	Burney. Cross-referenced to FRANCOEUR.
REGINELLI, NICOLA	18th	Italy	Singer	0.2	Burney. See Burney's History, Mercer's ed.
REGNARD, JOHN-FRANCIS	17th	France	Playwright	0.5	Burney. See Burney's History, Mercer's ed.
REICHARDT, JOHN FREDERICK	18th	Germany	Chapel master	0.3	Burney. See Burney's History, Mercer's ed.

== Vol 30 Republic-Rzemien ==
Name	Century	Country	Occupation	Columns	Contributor/notes
RHAW, GEORGE	16th	Germany	Bookseller and musician	0.2	Burney. See Burney's History, Mercer's ed.
RHODOPE	Antiquity	Greece	Courtesan and flautist	0.4	Burney.
RICCOBONI, LOUIS	17th-18th	Italy	Actor and writer on theatre	0.3	Burney. See Burney's History, Mercer's ed. and see Burney's Musical Tours, Scholes's ed.
RICCOBONI, MARIE LABORAS DE MEZIERES	18th	France	Actress and novelist	0.3	Burney. Second wife of the preceding.
RICHTER, FRANCIS-XAVIER	18th	France	Composer	0.3	Burney.
RIEGEL, HENRY JOSEPH	18th	Germany	Composer	0.5	Burney, after Laborde.
RIGEL OR REIGEL, ANTHONY	18th	France?	Harpsichordist and Composer	0.1	Burney.
RINOLDO DI CAPUA	18th	Italy	Composer	1.2	Burney. See Burney's History, Mercer's ed. and see Burney's Musical Tours, Scholes's ed, under da Capua. Wrongly alphabetised. Should be Di Capua, Rinaldo.
RINUCCINI, OTTAVIO	16th	Italy	Composer	0.3	Burney. See Burney's History, Mercer's ed. Cross-referenced to RECITATIVE, CAVALIERE and ORATORIO.
RIZZIO, DAVID	16th	Italy	Courtier and musician	0.9	Burney. See Burney's History, Mercer's ed.
ROBERT	9th-10th	France	King of France and musician	1.1	Burney, after Laborde
ROBINSON, JOHN	18th	England	Organist	2.9	Burney. See Burney's History, Mercer's ed.
ROBINSON MISS	18th	England	Harpsichordist and singer	0.2	Burney. Daughter of the preceding.
ROBINSON, MRS ANASTASIA	18th	England	Singer	0.2	Burney. See Burney's History, Mercer's ed.
ROCCO RODIO	15th-16th	Italy	Composer and writer on music	0.2	Burney. Wrongly alphabetised: should be Rodio, Rocco. See Burney's History, Mercer's ed. under Rodio
ROCHOIS, LA	17th	France	Singer	0.2	Burney. After Bonnet. See Burney's History, vol 1, p 470 of Mercer's ed.
RODOLPHE, [JEAN-JOSEPH]	18th	France	French horn player	0.2	Burney.
ROGERS, DR BENJAMIN	17th	England	Composer	1.0	Burney. See Burney's History, Mercer's ed.
ROLLE, JOHANN HEINRICH	18th	Germany	Composer	0.2	Burney.
ROLLI, PAOLO	17th-18th	Italy	Poet	0.5	Burney.
ROMIEU, M.	18th	France	Writer on music	0.6	Burney. See Burney's History, vol 2, p 978 of Mercer's ed.
RONCAGLIA, FRANCESCO	18th	Italy	Opera singer	0.3	Burney. See Burney's History, vol 2, p 4p 885-886 of Mercer's ed.
ROSA, SALVATOR	17th	Italy	Painter	2.5	Burney. See Burney's History, Mercer's ed. and see Burney's Musical Tours, Scholes's ed. The conclusion (1.8 col) is an account of Rosa's music book, then in Burney's possession.
ROSEINGRAVE, THOMAS	18th	Ireland	Composer	2.6	Burney. See Burney's History, Mercer's ed.
ROSETTI, ANTONIO	18th	Bohemia	Violinist and music publisher	0.2	Burney.
ROSSI, LEMME	17th	Italy	Writer on Music	0.1	Burney. See Burney's History, vol 2, p 428 of Mercer's ed.
ROSSI, MICHAEL ANGELO	17th	Italy	Violinist	0.1	Burney. See Burney's History, Mercer's ed.
ROSSI, LA PASQUA	18th	Italy	Singer	4 lines	Burney. Burney refers to the Musical Tours, but the name is not indexed in Scholes's ed.
ROSSI, FRANCESCO DI PUGLIA	17th	Italy	Opera Composer	5 lines	Burney. See Burney's History, Mercer's ed.
ROVETTA, DON GIOVANNI BATISTA	17th	Italy	Composer	0.2	Burney. See Burney's History, Mercer's ed.
ROUSSEAU, JEAN JACQUES	18th	Switzerland	Philosopher and writer on music	9.0	The concluding paragraphs (1.2 col) are by Burney. See Burney's History, Mercer's ed. and see Burney's Musical Tours, Scholes's ed,
ROUSSIER,[PIERRE JOSEPH] ABBÉ	18th	France	Cleric and writer on music	0.6	Burney. See Burney's History, Mercer's ed. and see Burney's Musical Tours, Scholes's ed. Cross-referenced to CHINESE Music
ROZE, NICHOLAS	18th	France	Singing master and composer	0.7	Burney, after Laborde.
RUBINELLI, GIOVANNI [MARIA]	18th-19th	Italy	Singer	1.1	Burney. See Burney's History, Mercer's ed.
RUE, PIERRE DE LA	15th	Netherlands	Composer	0.3	Burney. See Burney's History, Mercer's ed.
RUSSELL, ----	18th	England	Ballad composer	0.2	Burney.

== Vol 31 S-Scotium ==
Name	Century	Country	Occupation	Columns	Contributor/notes
SABBADINI, DON BERNARD	18th	England	Choir master	0.2	Burney.
SABBATINI, GALEAZZO	17th	Italy	writer on music	0.2	Burney. See Burney's History, Mercer's ed.
SACCHI, PADRE GIOVENALE	18th	Italy	Writer on music	0.2	Burney. See Burney's History, Mercer's ed.
SACCHINI, ANTONIO	18th	Italy	Composer	2.1	Burney. See Burney's History, Mercer's ed. and see Burney's Musical Tours, Scholes's ed.
SAINT GEORGE, JOSEPH BOLOGNE DE	18th	Guadeluope	Dilettante musician and composer	3.0	Burney.
SAINTWIX, THOMAS	15th	England	Doctor of Music	0.1	Burney. See Burney's History, vol 1, p 680 of Mercer's ed. Cross-referenced to DOCTOR of Music and DEGREES
SALA, NICOLA	18th	Italy	Writer on music	3.1	Burney. Includes example of notation. Cross-referenced to AUTHENTIC and PLAGAL.
SALINAS, FRANCIS	16th-17th	Spain	Writer on music	2.4	Burney, after Rousseau. See Burney's History, Mercer's ed. Includes example of notation.
SALMON, THOMAS	17th	England	Writer on music	1.1	Burney. See Burney's History, Mercer's ed. Includes samples of notation.
SANDONI, PIETRO GIUSEPPE	17th-18th	Italy	Composer	0.1	Burney. See Burney's History, Mercer's ed. Cross-referenced to CUZZONI.
SANTARELLI, GIUSEPPE	18th	Italy	Composer and writer on music	0.9	Burney. See Burney's History, Mercer's ed. and see Burney's Musical Tours, Scholes's ed
SARTI, GIUSEPPI	18th	Italy	Composer	0.9	Burney. See Burney's History, Mercer's ed. and see Burney's Musical Tours, Scholes's ed.
SARTORIO, ANTONIO	17th	Italy	Composer	0.1	Burney. See Burney's History, Mercer's ed.
SAVAGE, ---- [WILLIAM]	18th	England	Singer	0.4	Burney. See Burney's History, vol 2, p 818 of Mercer's ed.
SAVOI, GASPARO	18th	Italy	Singer	0.3	Burney. See Burney's History, vol 2, p 871 of Mercer's ed.
SCARLATTI, ALESSANDRO	17th-18th	Italy	Composer	1.6	Burney. See Burney's History, Mercer's ed. and see Burney's Musical Tours, Scholes's ed.
SCARLATTI, DOMENICO	18th	Italy	Composer	1.0	Burney. See Burney's History, Mercer's ed. and see Burney's Musical Tours, Scholes's ed. Son of the preceding.
SCARLATTI, GIUSEPPI	18th-19th	Italy	Composer	0.2	Burney. See Burney's History, Mercer's ed. and see Burney's Musical Tours, Scholes's ed. Son of the preceding.
SCHEIBEN, ADOLPHUS	18th	Denmark	Writer in music	0.1	Burney. See Burney's History, vol 2, p 948 of Mercer's ed.
SCHINDLERIN, [CATHERINE]	18th	Italy	Singer	0.4	Burney. See Burney's History, vol 2, p 881 of Mercer's ed.
SCHOBERT, ---- [JOHANNES]	18th	Germany	Composer	0.9	Burney. See Burney's History, vol 2, p 956 note of Mercer's ed. and see Burney's Musical Tours, Scholes's ed.
SCHOENER ----	18th	Switzerland	Violinist	5 lines	Burney.

== Vol 32 Scotland-Sindy ==
Name	Century	Country	Occupation	Columns	Contributor/notes
SCOTT, GEORGE LEWIS	18th	Scotland	Writer on Music	0.4	Burney. See Burney's History, Mercer's ed., Vol 2, p 988 in the middle of material about Pepusch.
SEDAINE, MICHEL JEAN	18th	France	Dramatic writer	0.3	Burney. See Burney's Musical Tours, Scholes's ed.
SENAILLÉE, JOHN BAPTISTE	17th-18th	France	Violinist	0.3	Burney.
SERRA, PAOLO	18th	Italy	Writer on Music	1.2	Burney. See Burney's History, Mercer's ed. Includes example of notation.
SHERIDAN, the late Mrs	18th	England	Singer	0.6	Burney.
SHERRINGHAM	15th	England	Composer	0.1	Burney. See Burney's History, Mercer's ed. under Sheryngham. Cross-referenced to FAIRFAX.
SHIELDS, WILLIAM	18th-19th	England	Composer	0.1	Burney. See Burney's History, Mercer's ed.
SHORE, JOHN	18th	England	Trumpeter	0.3	Burney
SHUTTLEWORTH, OBEDIAH	18th	England	Organist	0.4	Burney.
SIGNORELLI, PIETRO NAPOLI	18th	Italy	Writer on Music	0.3	Burney. See Burney's History, Mercer's ed.
SILBERMANN, JOHANN ANDREAS	18th	Germany	Organ builder	0.2	Burney. See Burney's Musical Tours, Scholes's ed.
SIMPSON, CHRISTOPHER	17th	England	Viol da Gamba player	0.9	Burney. See Burney's History, Mercer's ed.
SIMPSON, REDMOND	18th	England	Hautbois player	0.3	Burney.

== Vol 33 Sines-Starboard ==
Name	Century	Country	Occupation	Columns	Contributor/notes
SIRMAN, MADDALENA	18th	Italy	Violinist	0.3	Burney. See Burney's Musical Tours Scholes's ed.
SMEATON, MARK	16th	England	Musician	0.3	Burney. See Burney's History, Mercer's ed.
SMITH, ROBERT	18th	England	Mathematician and writer on Music	1.3	Burney. See Burney's History, Mercer's ed.
SMITH, JOHN CHRISTOPHER	18th	Germany	Musician	1.2	Burney. See Burney's History, Mercer's ed.
SMITH, FATHER [Bernhardt]	17th	Germany	Organ builder	0.8	Burney. See Burney's History, Mercer's ed.
SMITH, THEODORE	18th	Germany	Composer	0.2	Burney.
SNEGACIUS, CYRIACUS	16th	Germany	Writer on Music	0.1	Burney. See Burney's History, Mercer's ed.
SNOW, VALENTINE	18th	England	Trumpeter	0.2	Burney. See Burney's History, Mercer's ed.
SORIANO, FRANCESCO	17th	Italy	Choir master and composer	0.4	Burney. See Burney's History, Mercer's ed.
SPATARO, GIOVANNI	18th	Italy	Writer on Music	0.2	Burney. See Burney's History, Mercer's ed. Cross-referenced to PYTHAGORAS and RAMIS.
STAMITZ, JOHN	18th	Germany	Concert master	0.2	Burney. See Burney's History, Mercer's ed.
STAMITZ, CHARLES	18th	Germany	Composer	0.3	Burney. See Burney's History, Mercer's ed. Son of the preceding.
STAMITZ, ANTHONY	17th	Germany	Composer	4 lines	Burney. Brother of the preceding.
STANESBY, THOMAS	18th	England	Flute-maker	0.5	Burney.
STANLEY, JOHN	18th	England	Organist	0.5	Burney. See Burney's History, Mercer's ed.

== Vol 34 Starch-Szydlow ==
Name	Century	Country	Occupation	Columns	Contributor/notes
STEELE, RICHARD	17th-18th	England	Writer	2.0	The conclusion (0.5 col) deals with his musical life. Burney. See Burney's History, Mercer's ed.
STEFFANI, AUGOSTINO	17th-18th	Italy	Writer on Music	0.2	Burney. See Burney's History, Mercer's ed.
STELLA, GIUSEPPI MARIA	17th	Italy	Writer on Music	0.8	Burney.
STILLINGFLEET, BENJAMIN	18th	England	Writer on Music	3.2	Burney. See Burney's History, Mercer's ed.
STRADA, ANNA MARIA DEL PO	18th	Italy	Opera singer	0.6	Burney. See Burney's History, Mercer's ed.
STRADELLA, ALESSANDRO	17th	Italy	Composer	3.2	Burney. See Burney's History, Mercer's ed. and Burney's Musical Tours, Scholes's ed.
STRIGGIO, ALESSADRO	16th	Italy	Composer	0.4	Burney. See Burney's History, Mercer's ed.
SUARD M. [JEAN-BAPTISTE-ANTOINE]	18th	France	Man of letters	0.1	Burney. See Burney's Musical Tours Scholes's ed.

== Vol 35 T-Toleration ==
Name	Century	Country	Occupation	Columns	Contributor/notes
TACET, JOSEPH	18th	France	Flautist	0.1	Burney.
TALLIS, THOMAS	16th	England	Composer	0.2	Burney. See Burney's History, Mercer's ed.
TARTINI, GIUSEPPE	18th	Italy	Violinist and composer	3.1	Burney. See Burney's History, Mercer's ed. and see Burney's Musical Tours, Scholes's ed. Cross-referenced to SYSTEM, STILLINGFLEET, and RECITATIVE.
TASSONI, ALESSANDRO	17th	Italy	Poet and man of letters	1.2	The article concludes with a section by Burney (0.6 col) about Tassoni's musical writings. Cross-referenced to RIZZIO and OSSIAN.
TAVERNER, JOHN	16th	England	Composer	1.5	Burney. See Burney's History, Mercer's ed.
TEDESCHINI, CHRISTIANI	18th	Germany	Singer and singing-master	0.3	Burney.
TELEMANN, GIO. PHILIP	17th	Germany	Composer	0.4	Burney. See Burney's History, Mercer's ed.
TENDUCCI FERDINANDO	18th	Italy	Singer	1.3	Burney. See Burney's History, Mercer's ed.
TERPANDER	Antiquity	Greece	Musician	1.1	Burney. See Burney's History, Mercer's ed. Cross-referenced to Musical GAMES.
TERRADEGLAIS, DOMENICO	18th	Italy	Composer	1.0	Burney. See Burney's History, Mercer's ed. under Terradelas
TESI TRAMONTINI, VITTORIA	17th-18th	Italy	Singer	0.9	Burney. See Burney's History, Mercer's ed. under The Tesi and see Burney's Musical Tours, Scholes's ed.
TESSARINI, CARLO	17th-18th	Italy	Violinist	0.3	Burney. See Burney's History, Mercer's ed.
TESTORE, CARLO GIOVANNI	18th	Italy	Violinist	0.2	Burney. See Burney's History, Mercer's ed.
TEVO, ZACCARIA	17th-18th	Italy	Writer on music	0.6	Burney. See Burney's History, Mercer's ed.
THAMYRIS in Mythology	Antiquity	Greece	Singer	0.5	Burney. See Burney's History, vol 1, p 480 of Mercer's ed.
THEINRED	14th	England	Writer on Music	0.6	Burney. See Burney's History, Mercer's ed.
THEODORUS	Antiquity	Greece	Flute-maker	0.2	Burney. See Burney's History, vol 1, p 330 of Mercer's ed. Cross-referenced to ISMENIAS
THÉVENARD, GABRIEL VINCENT	France	17th-18th	Singer	0.5	Burney, after Laborde.
TIMOTHEUS	Antiquity	Greece	Poet-Musician	1.5	Burney. See Burney's History, Mercer's ed. Cross-referenced to SENATUS-CONSULTUM
TIRABOSCHI, GIRALAMO	18th	Italy	Literary historian	1.6	Burney. Includes criticism by Burney (0.8 col) of his work.Cross-referenced to BARTOLI and ROSSI.
TODI, MARIA FRANCISCA	18th	Portugal	Singer	0.2	Burney. See Burney's History, vol 2, p 886 of Mercer's ed.
TOESCHI, ALESSANDRO	18th	Romania	Musician	4 lines	Burney.
TOESCHI, CHARLES JOSEPH	18th	Romania	Musician	0.2	Burney.
TOESCHI, JOHN	18th	Romania	Violinist	3 lines	Burney.
TOESCHI, SUSANNAH	18th	Romania	Singer	3 lines	Burney.
TOFTS, KATHERINE	17th-18th	Italy	Singer	1.5	Burney. Cross-referenced to CLAYTON

== Vol 36 Tol-Ver ==
Name	Century	Country	Occupation	Columns	Contributor/notes
TOLLETT, THOMAS	17th-18th	England	Flautist	0.1	Burney. Includes example of notation
TOMKINS, THOMAS	17th	England	Composer	1.1	Burney. See Burney's History, Mercer's ed.
TORELLI GIUSEPPE	17th-18th	Italy	Violinist and Composer	0.3	Burney. See Burney's History, Mercer's ed.
TOZZI, ANTONIO	18th	Italy	Composer	0.1	Burney.
TRAETTA, TOMASO	18th	Italy	Composer	1.3	Burney. See Burney's History, Mercer's ed. and see Burney's Musical Tours, Scholes ed.
TRAVERS, JOHN	18th	England	Composer	0.3	Burney. See Burney's History, Mercer's ed.
TRIAL, Jean Claude	18th	France	Opera director	0.7	Burney. See Burney's History, Mercer's ed.
TUDWAY, Dr THOMAS	17th	England	Composer	1.5	Burney. See Burney's History, Mercer's ed.
TUNSTEDE [SIMON DE]	14th	England	Writer on Music	0.3	Burney. See Burney's History, Mercer's ed. under Tunsted.
TURINI, FRANCESCO	17th	Italy	Composer	0.5	Burney. See Burney's History, Mercer's ed.
TURNER, WILLIAM	17th-18th	England	Composer	0.6	Burney. See Burney's History, Mercer's ed.
TUSSER, JOHN [Sic = Thomas]	16th	England	Farmer	0.5	Burney. See Burney's History, vol 2, p 23 of Mercer's ed.
TYE, Dr CHRISTOPHER	16th	England	Composer	0.7	Burney. See Burney's History, Mercer's ed.
TYERS, JONATHAN	18th	England	Proprietor of Vauxhall gardens	1.2	Burney. See Burney's History, Mercer's ed. Cross-referenced to VAUXHALL
VALENTINI, PIETRO FRANCESCO	17th	Italy	Composer	0.5	Burney. See Burney's History, Mercer's ed.
VALENTINI, ROBERTO	17th-18th	England	Composer	3 lines	Burney.
VALENTINI, GIUSEPPE	17th-18th	Italy	Composer	0.1	Burney. See Burney's History, Mercer's ed.
VALENTINI, URBANI	18th	Italy	Singer	3 lines	Burney. See Burney's History, Mercer's ed.
VALLOTTI, PADRE FRANCESCO ANTONIO	18th	Italy	Composer	0.3	Burney. See Burney's History, vol 2, p 939 of Mercer's ed.
VANHALL, JOHN	18th-19th	Austria	Composer	0.3	Burney. See Burney's History, Mercer's ed. under Vanhal
VENOSA, CARLO GESUALDO, Prince of	16th	Italy	Composer	1.6	Burney. See Burney's History, vol 2, p 177 of Mercer's ed. Cross-referenced to DAVID RIZZIO, SCOTS tunes and OSSIAN.
VENTO, MATTEO	18th	Italy	Composer	0.3	Burney. See Burney's History, Mercer's ed.
VERACINI, ANTONIO	17th-18th	Italy	Composer	0.2	Burney. See Burney's History, Mercer's ed.
VERACINI, FRANCESCO, MARIO	18th	Italy	Violinist	1.3	Burney. See Burney's History, Mercer's ed. Nephew of the preceding.

== Vol 37 Vermes-Waterloo ==
Name	Century	Country	Occupation	Columns	Contributor/notes
VIADANA, LODOVICO	17th	Italy	Writer on Music	0.8	Burney. See Burney's History, Mercer's ed. Cross-referenced to CHORDS, ACCOMPANIMENT and THOROUGH-Base
VICENTINO, DON NICOLO	16th	Italy	Writer on Music	1.0	Burney.
VIGANONI, GIUSEPPE	18th	Italy	Singer	0.3	Burney. See Burney's History, Mercer's ed.
VINCENT, THOMAS	18th	England	Impresario	0.3	Burney. See Burney's History, vol 2, p 870 of Mercer's ed.
VINCENT, RICHARD	18th	England	Hautbois player	0.2	-
VINCI, LEONARDO	18th	Italy	Composer	1.3	Burney. See Burney's History, Mercer's ed. and see Burney's Musical Tours, Scholes's ed.
VIOLA, FRANCESCA DELLA	16th	Italy	Choir master	6 lines	Burney.
VIOTTI, ---- [GIOVANNI BATTISTA]	18th-19th	Italy	Violinist	1.0	Burney.
VISCONTI, CATERINA	18th	Italy	Singer	0.4	Burney. See Burney's History, Mercer's ed.
VITTORIA, LUDOVICO [sic TOMASSO]	16th	Spain	Composer	0.2	Burney. See Burney's History, Mercer's ed. under Vittorio
VITRUVIUS. M. POLLO	Antiquity	Italy	Polymath	0.7	Burney wrote the final section (0.2 col)about his musical activities. See Burney's History, Mercer's ed. Cross-referenced to ORGAN and HYDRAULICON.
VIVALDI, DON ANTONIO	18th	Italy	Composer	0.3	Burney. See Burney's History, Mercer's ed. and see also Burney's Musical Tours, Scholes's ed. Cross-referenced to CONSERVATORIO.
VOGLER, GEORGE JOSEPH	18th	Germany	Musician	1.4	Burney.
VOLTAIRE, MARIE FRANÇOIS ARQUET DE	18th	France	Philosopher	3.7	Concludes with a (0.3 col) section by Burney. See Burney's History, Mercer's ed. and see Burney's Musical Tours, Scholes's ed
VOSSIUS, GERARD JOHN	16th	Germany	Polymath	2.0	Concludes with a (1.7 col) section by Burney. See Burney's History, Mercer's ed. Cross-referenced to RHYTHM.
WAGENSEIL, GEORGE CHRISTOPHER	18th	Austria	Harpsichord teacher and composer	0.8	Burney. See Burney's History, Mercer's ed. See also Burney's Musical Tours, Scholes's ed.
WAGNER, JOACHIM	18th	Germany	Organ builder	0.3	Burney.
WALLIS, JOHN	17th	England	Mathematician and writer on music	2.3	Burney. Burney wrote the final section (0.3 col) about Wallis's musical activities. See Burney's History, Mercer's ed. Cross-referenced to BASSE FONDAMENTALE and HARMONICS
WALSH, JOHN	18th	England	Music publisher	0.3	Burney. See Burney's History, Mercer's ed.
WALSINGHAM, THOMAS	16th	England	Writer on music	5 lines	Burney. See Burney's History, vol 1, p 691 of Mercer's ed. Cross-referenced to PROLATIO.
WALTHER, JOHN GODFREY	18th	Germany	Writer on Music	0.3	Burney. See Burney's History, Mercer's ed.
WALTHER, JOHN LUDOLPH	18th	Germany	Writer on Music	0.3	Burney.
WALTZ, [GUSTAVUS]	18th	Germany	Singer	0.2	Burney.
WARD, JOHN	17th-18th	England	Gresham Professor	1.1	Burney. Burney wrote the (0.4 col) section about Ward's writings on music. See Burney's History, Mercer's ed.
WARD, [JOHN]	16th-17th	England	Madrigalist	0.2	Burney. See Burney's History, Mercer's ed.
WARTON, THOMAS	18th	England	Poet	1.6	Concludes with a (0.4 col) section by Burney. See Burney's History, Mercer's ed.

== Vol 38 Water-Wzetin ==
Name	Century	Country	Occupation	Columns	Contributor/notes
WHITLOCK, BULSTRODE	17th	England	Lawyer and statesman	3.1	Concludes with a (0.8 col) section by Burney. See Burney's History, Mercer's ed. Cross-referenced to MASQUE, IVES and LAWES, WILLIAM.
WHYTE, ROBERT	16th	England	Composer	0.6	Burney. See Burney's History, Mercer's ed.under White.
WHYTHORNE, THOMAS	17th-18th	England	Composer	0.4	Burney. See Burney's History, Mercer's ed.
WILBYE, JOHN	16th	England	Madrigalist	0.2	Burney. See Burney's History, Mercer's ed.
WILLAERT, ADRIAN	15th-16th	Holland	Composer	1.7	Burney. See Burney's History, Mercer's ed.
WILLIAM III	17th	Holland	King of England	3.8	Concludes with a (0.2 col) section by Burney. See Burney's History, Mercer's ed.
WILSON, JOHN	17th	England	Musician	1.2	Burney. See Burney's History, Mercer's ed.
WISEMAN, MR	18th	England	Violinist	0.3	Burney. See Burney's History, Mercer's ed. See also Burney's Musical Tours, Sholes's ed.
WOLF, MICHAEL CHRISTIAN	18th	Germany	Composer	0.1	Burney.
WOLF, ERNST FRIEDERIC	18th	Germany	Composer	0.2	Burney. Brother of the preceding.
WOLF, ERNST WILLIAM	18th	Germany	Capel meister	3 lines	Burney.
WOOD, ANTHONY	17th	England	Antiquary	4.5	Concludes with a (4.1 col) section by Burney. Burney. See Burney's History, Mercer's ed.
WOOD ----	18th	England	Violinist	2 lines	Burney. See Burney's History, vol 2, p 1007 of Mercer's ed.
WOOD ----	18th	England	Organist	4 lines	Burney. See Burney's History, vol 2, p 1007 of Mercer's ed. Son of the preceding. This article is combined with the preceding one.
WORGAN, JOHN	18th	England	Organist	1.1	Burney. See Burney's History, vol 2, p 1009 of Mercer's ed.
WRIGHT, MISS [ELIZABETH]	18th	England	Singer	0.4	Burney
WYLDE, JOHN	15th	England	Writer on Music	0.6	Burney. See Burney's History, Mercer's ed. Cross-referenced to SERRA.
WYNNE, CASSANDRA FREDERICA	18th	England	Harpsichordist	0.4	Burney. See Musical Tours, Scholes's ed.
WYNNE ----	18th	England	Dilettanti violinist	0.3	Burney.

== Vol 39 X-Zytomiers with Addenda ==
Name	Century	Country	Occupation	Columns	Contributor/notes
YEATES, MRS	18th	England	Actress	0.4	Burney. See Burney's History, Mercer's ed. under Yates.
YOUNG - A musical family	17th-18th	England	Musicians	0.6	Burney. This is an omnibus article about the Young sisters --Cecilia, Isabella and Esther. They were children of Charles Young. Burney also mentions Mary Young, and Isabella Young their nieces. See Burney's History, Mercer's ed.
YOUNGE, NICHOLAS	16th	Italy	Madrigalist	1.6	Burney. See Burney's History, Mercer's ed. under Yonge,
YSSANDON, JEAN	16th	France	Writer on Music	5 lines	Burney, after Laborde.
ZACCONI, P. LUDOVICO	16th	Italy	Writer on Music	0.2	Burney. See Burney's History, Mercer's ed.
ZACHAW, FREDERIC WILHELM	17th-18th	Germany	Organist	0.1	Burney.
ZANETTI, ANTONIO	17th-18th	Italy	Maestro da capella	5 lines	Burney. See Burney's History, Mercer's ed.
ZANETTI, FRANCISCO	?18th	Italy	Maestro da capella	0.3	Burney. See Burney's History, Mercer's ed.
ZANOTTI, L'ABATE GIANCALISTO	18th	Italy	Composer	0.3	Burney. See Burney's Musical Tours, Scholes's ed
ZARLINO, GIUSEPPI [sic. Should be GIOSEFFO]	16th	Italy	Writer on Music	2.1	Burney. See Burney's History, Mercer's ed. See Burney's Musical Tours, Scholes's ed.
ADDENDA AND CORRIGENDA
WATSON, THOMAS	17th	England	Poet	0.5	Burney. See Burney's History, Mercer's ed.
WEBB[E], senior [SAMUEL]	18th-19th	England	Composer	5 lines	Burney. See Burney's History, Mercer's ed. Cross-referenced to CATCH and CATCH-CLUB.
WEBB, DANIEL	18th	England	Writer on Music	0.7	Burney.
WEIDMAN [CARL FREIDRICH]	18th	German	Flautist	0.2	Burney.
WEIGEL [sic Should be WEIGL, Joseph Franz]	18th-19th	Austria	Cellist	0.4	Burney.
WEISS, SILVIUS LEOPOLD	18th	Germany	Lutenist	0.2	Burney.
WELDON, JOHN	17th-18th	England	Composer	1.2	Burney. See Burney's History, Mercer's ed.
WENDLING, J. BAPTIST AND FAMILY	18th	Germany	Flautist	0.1	Burney. Mentions his brothers Francis and Charles, violinists and a sister who was a singer.
WHITE, JOHN	18th	England	Hatter and music collector	0.2	Burney. White possessed the music book of Dr Robert Fayrfax.
