= 1692 in music =

The year 1692 in music involved some significant events.

== Events ==
- July 7 – Giuseppe Felice Tosi becomes second organist at San Petronio, Bologna.
- Seven-year-old George Frideric Handel visits the court of Saxony at Weissenfels. Duke Johann Adolf is so impressed at his playing of the organ that he advises his father to let him study music under Friedrich Wilhelm Zachau.

== Publications ==
- John Lenton and Thomas Tollett – A Consort of Musick of Three Parts
- Jacques Guislain Pamart – Messe et mottets à une, deux et 5 voix, instruments et ripienes, Op. 1
- John Playford – The Banquet of Musick
- Johannes Schenk – Il giardino armonico, Op.3

== Classical music ==
- Heinrich Ignaz Franz Biber – Requiem in F Minor
- Dietrich Buxtehude
  - Was mich auf dieser Welt betrübt, BuxWV 105
  - Trio Sonata in D major, BuxWV 267
- Marc-Antoine Charpentier
  - Magnificat à 4 voix avec instruments, H.79
  - Verbum caro, panum verbum, H.267
  - Canticum de Sancto Xaverio reformatum, H.355a
- Johann Kuhnau – Neuer Clavier-Übung, anderer Theil
- Marin Marais – Pièces en trio
- Rupert Ignaz Mayr – Pythagorische Schmids-Fuencklein
- Henry Purcell
  - Ode to St. Cecilia, Z. 328
  - If Music be the Food of Love, Z.379
  - Stript of Their Green Our Groves Appear, Z.444
  - Aureng-Zebe, Z.573
  - Oedipus, Z.583 (inc. Musick for a While)
  - The Libertine, Z.600
- Ludovico Roncalli – Capricci armonici sopra la chitarra spagnola
- Giuseppe Torelli – Sinfonie a 3 e Concerti a 4, Op.5
- Antonio Veracini – Trio Sonatas, Op.1

== Opera ==
- Cataldo Amodei – La sirena consolata (lost)
- Carlo Agostino Badia – La ninfa Apollo
- Antonio Perti – Furio Camillo
- Henry Purcell – The Fairy Queen (masque)

== Births ==
- January 6 – Rynoldus Popma van Oevering, composer
- January 13 – Gunnila Grubb composer (died 1729)
- April 8 – Giuseppe Tartini, violinist and composer (died 1770)
- May 28 – Geminiano Giacomelli, opera composer (died 1740)
- November 2 – Unico Wilhelm van Wassenaer, composer (died 1766)
- November 21 – Carlo Innocenzo Frugoni, librettist (died 1768)

== Deaths ==
- February 24 – Antimo Liberati, Italian music theorist, composer, and contralto singer (b. 1617)
- July 10 – Heinrich Bach, German organist (born 1615)
- October 12 – Giovanni Battista Vitali, Italian composer of sonatas (born c.1644)
- November 14 – Christoph Bernhard, German composer (born 1628)
- November 19 – Thomas Shadwell, librettist (born c.1642)
- date unknown – John Reading, organist and composer (born c.1645)
