= Antoniotto =

Antoniotto is a given name and a surname. Notable people with this name include the following:

== Given name ==
- Antoniotto Adorno (1340–1398), Italian nobleman
- Antoniotto II Adorno (c. 1479 – 1528), Italian nobleman
- Antoniotto Botta Adorno (1688–1774), Italian diplomat and military officer
- Antoniotto di Montaldo (1368–1398), Italian nobleman
- Antoniotto Usodimare (1416–1462), Genoese trader and explorer

== Surname ==
- Giorgio Antoniotto (1680–1766), Italian musician
