= Jean Joseph Marie Amiot =

French Jesuit missionary in China (1718–1793)

Joseph Marie Amiot
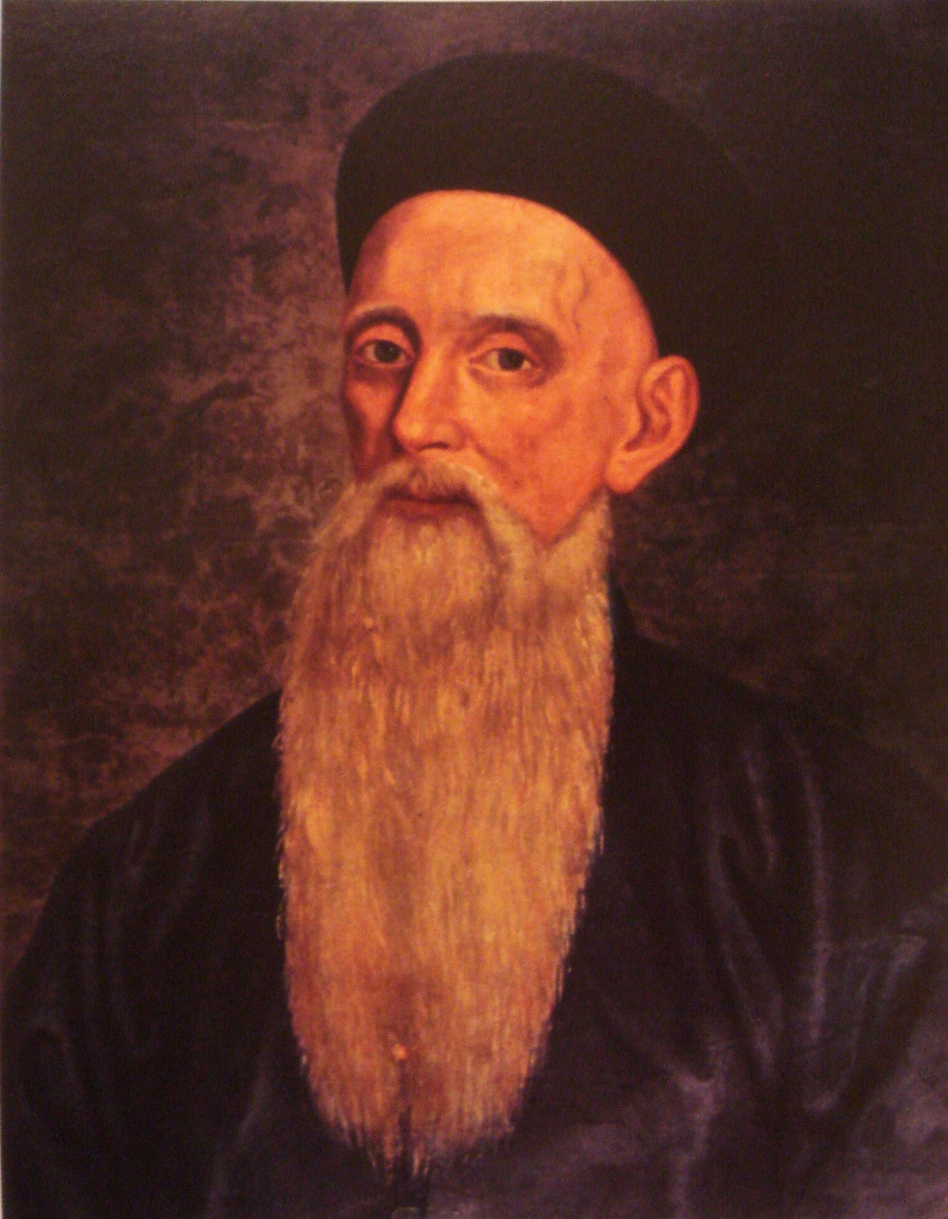
- Painting of Amiot, anon.
- Born: February 8, 1718; Toulon, Kingdom of France
- Died: October 9, 1793 (aged 75); Beijing, Qing Empire
- Occupation: Jesuit missionary

Jean Joseph Marie Amiot (Chinese: 錢德明; pinyin: Qián Démíng, French: [ʒɑ̃ ʒozɛf maʁi amjo]; February 8, 1718 – October 9, 1793) was a French Jesuit priest who worked in Qing China, during the reign of the Qianlong Emperor.

Born in Toulon, Amiot entered the novitiate of the Society of Jesus at the age of 19. After he was ordained in 1746, he aspired to serve in an overseas mission. Eventually, he was assigned a mission in China and left France in 1749. He arrived at Beijing in 1751 and remained there for the rest of his life.

Amiot served as an intermediary between the academics of Europe and China. His correspondence provided insight on the culture of China to the Europeans. He is the most important source of informations, images, and musical scores for the knowledge of Chinese music in Europe in the XVIII century. He translated Chinese works into French. Most notably, his translation of Sun Tzu's The Art of War is the first rendition of the work into a Western language.

== Early life ==
Amiot was born in Toulon on February 8, 1718 to Louis Amiot, the royal notary of Toulon, and Marie-Anne Serre. He was the eldest of ten children: five boys and five girls. His brother Pierre-Jules-Roch Amiot would go on to become the lieutenant-general of the admiralty of Toulon and his sister, Marguerite-Claire was an Ursuline nun. Amiot maintained contact with both.

After finishing his studies in philosophy and theology at the Jesuit seminary in Toulon, Amiot entered the novitiate of the Society of Jesus in Avignon on September 27, 1737; he remained a novice for two years. Afterwards, he taught at the Jesuit colleges of Besançon, Arles, Aix-en-Provence and finally at Nîmes, where he was professor of rhetoric in the academic year of 1744–1745. He completed his theological studies at Dôle from 1745 to 1748 and was ordained as a priest on December 22, 1746.

== Arrival at China ==
Amiot requested Franz Retz, the Superior General of the Society of Jesus at that time, to serve in an overseas mission, and was eventually given a mission to China. Earlier, in a letter to his brother, he had expressed his desire to serve in a delegation to this particular country. He left France in 1749, accompanied by Chinese Jesuits Paul Liu and Stanislas Kang, who had been sent to study in France and were returning to their home country. Kang died at sea, before the party could reach China.

They arrived at Macau on July 27, 1750. The Jesuits of Beijing announced Amiot's arrival, along with that of the Portuguese Jesuits José d'Espinha and Emmanuel de Mattos, to Emperor Qianlong, who ordered that they be taken to the capital. On March 28, 1751, they left Macau for Guangzhou and arrived there five days later. They left Canton on June 2, and reached Beijing on August 22.

After his arrival in Beijing, he was put in charge of the children's congregation of the Holy Guardian Angels. Alongside this, he studied the Chinese language. He adopted the Chinese name Qian Deming (錢德明) and wore Chinese clothing in order to adapt himself to the culture of China. In 1754, Amiot made a young Chinese man by the name of Jacob Yang Ya-Ko-Pe his assistant and instructed him in the European manner. Yang died in 1784, after working with Amiot for over thirty years.

== Suppression of the Jesuits ==
In 1762 the Parlement of Paris ordered the suppression of the Society of Jesus and the confiscation of its property. The society was abolished in France two years later, by the order of King Louis XV. The Jesuit mission in China survived for a while after their suppression, being protected by the Qianlong Emperor himself. The final blow, however, would be Pope Clement XIV's brief, Dominus ac Redemptor, issued on July 21, 1773, with which the Bishop of Rome officially ordered the suppression of the Society of Jesus. The brief reached the French Jesuits in China on September 22, 1775 via a German Carmelite named Joseph de Sainte-Thérèse. The Jesuits of Beijing surrendered to it, resigned from the Society of Jesus and became secular priests. Wishing to keep the French mission alive, King Louis XVI sent them financial aid and appointed François Bourgeois as their administrator. Amiot was named as Bourgeois' replacement in the event of his absence.

Subsequently, Amiot turned his attention to writing. He maintained contact with Henri Bertin, the foreign minister of France. His correspondences were published from 1776 to 1791 in the Mémoires concernant l’histoire, les sciences, les arts, les mœurs et les usages des Chinois. He also corresponded with other European Academies, including brief contacts with the Imperial Academy of Sciences and the Royal Society.

== Later life and death ==
After the death of Bourgeois in 1792, Amiot started visiting the tombs of his Jesuit companions, where he prayed and meditated; he also carved the Jesuits' epitaphs on their tombs. News about the upheaval of the French Revolution distressed him to the point that his physical and mental health declined, and thus he had to stop visiting the tombs by September 1792.

In 1792, Britain sent a diplomatic mission to China, led by George Macartney. The goals of the delegation were to open new trading ports with the country and establish a permanent mission there. Macartney had wished to meet Amiot in Beijing. However, he was too ill to meet the diplomat and instead sent him a portrait of himself and a letter, which was delivered on October 3, 1793. He gave his advice to Macartney and suggested that he leave China.

On October 8, 1793, the news of King Louis XVI's execution reached Amiot, who celebrated Mass for the deceased monarch. He died that night, or on the following day, October 9, 1793.

== Works ==
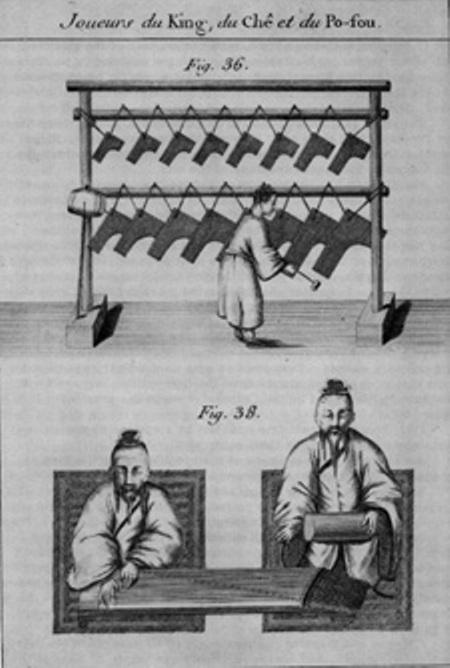
A page from Mémoires concernant l'histoire, les sciences et les arts des Chinois, 1780.

In 1772 Amiot's translation of Sun Tzu's The Art of War was published. It includes a translation of the Yongzheng Emperor's Ten Precepts. Amiot was the first person to translate The Art of War in the West. The next translation of the work in a Western language would not be made until Everard Ferguson Calthrop published his English rendition in 1905.

Amiot could speak in Manchu, the language of the emperor. He wrote a Manchu-French dictionary, which was published from 1789 to 1790 with the help of Bertin; Prince Hongwu, a member of the Qing imperial family, praised the dictionary. He also wrote a Manchu grammar, which was never published.

Amiot carried out scientific observations and experiments while working in China. For example, he made a record of the weather in Beijing, which was published by Charles Messier in 1774. He also tried to build a hot air balloon, but was discouraged by Prince Hongwu, for fear of the danger of flying and disseminating the discovery.

== Music ==
Amiot could play the harpsichord and the flute. He tried to please Chinese listeners by playing pieces by French baroque composers, including Rameau's Les sauvages and Les cyclopes. These attempts, however, were not successful; when he asked the Chinese musicians for their opinions, they remarked that "your music was not made for our ears, nor our ears for your music". Lester Hu, assistant professor of musicology at the University of California, Berkeley has doubted the veracity of this story.

Amiot sent his translation of Li Guangdi's Guyue Jingzhuan (古樂經傳), a treatise on Chinese music, to Paris in 1754; he later acknowledged that it contained errors and was incomplete. Jean-Philippe Rameau referenced the work in his 1760 treatise, Code de musique pratique, though Rameau's idea of harmony in Chinese music was erroneous. Probably the same year 1754, he sent a first manuscript on Chinese music (De la Musique moderne des Chinois), kept at the Bibliothèque nationale de France. Later, in 1776, he sent a new manuscript on Chinese music, Mémoire sur la musique des Chinois was published twice by Pierre-Joseph Roussier in 1779 and 1780. The author's supplements to the work were not published until 1997. In 1776, he sent a series of musical instrument, including a Sheng , thus possibly contributing to the introduction of free reed in Europe. Amiot's most important contribution to music includes the sending in 1776 of a series of four books of music: "Divertissements chinois" and "Musique sacrée", all having been transcribed, studied, played, recorded and published by Jean-Christophe Frisch and his ensemble XVIII-21 Le Baroque nomade and François Picard and his ensemble Fleur de Prunus.
