= Ann Valentine =

English organist and composer

Ann Valentine (11 January 1762 – 13 October 1842 or 13 October 1845) was an English organist, composer, and seller of music. She was part of a talented family of Leicester musicians.

== Life ==
Ann Valentine was born on 11 January 1762 in Leicester and christened on 15 March. Her father John Valentine (1730–91) was a great-nephew of the composer Robert Valentine. John Valentine was a composer, music teacher, and musician. He played viola in the memorial concerts (the Handel Commemoration) held for George Frederic Handel in London in 1784; his son, Ann's brother Thomas Valentine (1759 – c. 1800) was a second violinist in the same concerts, and performed in London for at least the next decade. Another uncle, Henry Valentine, was an oboist and ran a music shop in Leicester. Ann's younger sister Sarah (1771–1843) was an organist at St Martin's Church in Leicester from 1800, and composed at least one work, The British March and Quickstep for the Pianoforte. Ann made her concert debut on the harpsichord in a family concert in 1777, at the age of fifteen.

Ann was hired in c. 1785 to be the organist at St Margaret's Church, Leicester. Also during 1785 Ann participated in several subscription concerts with some family. These concerts were promoted by the new construction of organs. Ann would play organ concertos, and harpsicord lessons by Handel. In 1790 she published a set of ten sonatas for harpsichord or piano with violin or flute accompaniment. She continued to publish music, although only some of it has survived; the ten sonatas and an arrangement of the strathspey Monny Musk are available in a modern edition. When her father died in 1791 she would continue in his work, however she chose to compose more music for "ladies" that being piano music unlike what her father had composed. Ann would continue to be the organist at St Margaret's Church at least up to 1834, it is also possible she played up until her death in October 13th, 1842, in Leicester.

== Works (partial list) ==
Ann Valentine had written a wide collection of works most of which has been lost to time, but some of which has been recovered.

- Le cheval de course, a Favorite Divertimento for the Piano Forte
- Ye Gentlest Gales. Written by a Lady on the Death of Mr. Henry Kirk White. Composed & Arranged for the Piano Forte, by A. Valentine
- Ten Sonatas for the pianoforte or harpsichord and violin or flute (1790)
- Monny Musk for keyboard (c. 1798)
- A Favorite March & Rondo for the Piano Forte. London [1808]
