= John Valentine (composer) =

English violinist, violist, & composer (1730–1791)

John Valentine (7 June 1730 – 10 September 1791) was an English violinist, violist and composer.

== Biography ==
John Valentine was born in Leicester, England, the son of John Valentine and his wife Sarah. By 1759 John Valentine owned and operated a music shop on New Bond Street in Leicester, which he later moved to other locations. He sold instruments and music and taught lessons in various instruments including keyboard and horn. Valentine performed at concerts in the area mostly as a violinist or violist, and played in the Handel Commemoration concerts in memorial for George Frederic Handel in London in 1784.

John Valentine was a member of a musical family in Leicester. He was the great-nephew of composer Robert Valentine. John's son Thomas Valentine (1759 – c. 1800) was also a violinist, who performed in the Handel Commemoration and in the London area for at least a decade. John's uncle, Henry Valentine, played oboe and also operated a music shop in Leicester. John Valentine married Tabitha Simpson (b. 1728) in 1755 and they had six children, including Sarah, John, Charles and Ann. Ann Valentine was a composer with work available in modern editions. Sarah (1771–1843) served as an organist at St Martin's Church in Leicester from 1800 to 1840, and composed at least one work, The British March and Quickstep for the Pianoforte. John Valentine died in Leicester and was buried at St Margaret's Church.

== Works ==
Valentine composed minuets, marches, sacred music and symphonies. He published a number of compositions during 1765–85. Selected works include:

- Eight Easy Symphonies (1782, Bodleian Library)
- The Epithalamium for Isabella, or the Fatal Marriage, for theatre (1762)
- My Shepherd is the Living Lord from Thirty Psalm Tunes, for SATB, text by Thomas Sternhold
- Ode to Peace, for SATB (1763)
- Ode on the Birthday of the Marquis of Granby
