= Rupert Ignaz Mayr =

German violinist and composer

Rupert Ignaz Mayr (1646 in Schärding – 7 February 1712 in Freising) was a German violinist, composer and Kapellmeister in Munich at the court of Maximilian II Emanuel, Elector of Bavaria.
