= Robert Valentine (composer) =

Italian composer (c.1671–1747)

Robert Valentine (c. 1671 – 26 May 1747), also known as Roberto Valentini and Roberto Valentino, was an English composer, recorder player, oboist and violinist, who moved to Rome and became a citizen of the Papal States. He is noted for his large number of compositions for the recorder.

== Biography ==
Born c. 1671, he was baptized in Leicester on 16 January 1674. He was the son of Thomas Follentine or Follintine, who lived in Leicester from c. 1670 and worked as a town musician there accompanied by his elder sons Thomas and Henry. The family became a prominent one in the musical life of Leicester; descendants included John Valentine, who was the grandson of Robert's eldest brother Thomas, and John Valentine's daughter Ann Valentine.

Robert Valentine seems to have spent little if any of his adult life in England before moving to the Papal States, where he became known by the Italian versions of his name. He settled in Rome and took a Roman wife, marrying Giulia Bellatti in September 1701 in the parish of Sant'Andrea delle Fratte. They had nine children, although only three of these survived their parents.

He died in the same Roman parish on 26 May 1747, only 12 days after the death of his wife, and not back in England at some other date, as was formerly thought.

== Works ==
Valentine is particularly known for his large output of compositions for the recorder, as well as for his reputation as a highly skilled player of that instrument. He also played the oboe and violin. His compositions were instrumental. They include a number of collections of sonatas and trio sonatas, as well as some examples of concerto grosso. His initial style closely followed that of Arcangelo Corelli, but he gradually progressed towards the Galante style, as evidenced by his later collections of sonatas published in Northern Europe.

Works with Opus number:

- Op. 1: 12 Trio sonatas (Amsterdam, 1708)
- Op. 2: 12 Sonatas for Alto recorder and B. c. (Rome, 1708)
- Op. 3: 12 Sonatas for Alto recorder and B. c. (Rome, 1710)
- Op. 4: 12 Balletti da camera, for 2 Violins and B. c. (Rome, 1711)
- Op. 4²: 6 Trio sonatas (Amsterdam, 1715)
- Op. 5: 6 Sonatas for 2 Flutes without Bass (Amsterdam, 1716)
- Op. 6: Sonatas for 2 Alto recorders without Bass (Amsterdam, 1716)
- Op. 7: 6 Sonatas for 2 Flutes or Violins without Bass
- Op. 8: "Setts of Aires and Chacoon" for 2 Alto recorders and B. c. (London, 1718)
- Op. 9: "Setts of Aires" for 2 Alto recorders and B. c. (London, 1718)
- Op. 10: 7 "Setts of Aires" for 2 Alto recorders and B. c (London, 1721)
- Op. 11: 6 Sonatas or solos for Alto recorder and Harpsichord (London, 1727)
- Op. 12: 12 Soli for Violin and B. c. (London, 1728)
- Op. 12²: 6 for Flute/Violin/Mandola or Oboe and B. c. (Rome, 1730)
- Op. 13: 6 Sonatas or Soli, for Flute and B. c. (London, 1735)

Works without Opus number:

- 6 Concerti grossi
- Concerto for Flute and Strings
- Concerto for 2 Flutes and Strings
- Sonata for Flute and Strings
- 12 Sonatas and a pastorale for 2 Oboes and B. c.
- 18 Sonata movements (sù l'aria di Tromba) for 2 Oboes and B. c.
- Divertimento for 2 Flutes
- La Villegiatura: 6 sonatas for 2 Flutes
- 12 Sonatas for Alto recorder and B. c

His works were popular in the amateur market for flute and recorder music, which flourished in England in the early 18th century, a time when the recorder was also fashionable in concert performance there. Valentine's prominence was recorded by John Hawkins in 1776 in his General History of the Science and Practice of Music:

And to come nearer to our own times, it may be remembered by many now living, that a flute was the pocket companion of many who wished to be thought fine gentlemen. The use of it was to entertain ladies, and such as had a liking for no better music than a song-tune, or such little airs as were then composed for that instrument; and he that could play a solo of Schickhard of Hamburg, or Robert Valentine of Rome, was held a complete master of the instrument.

== See also ==
- John Ravenscroft (composer), Valentine's English contemporary who also moved to Rome.

== Sources ==
- Drage, Sally (2004). "Valentine family (per. c. 1685–1845), musicians". Oxford Dictionary of National Biography (online ed.). Oxford University Press. doi:10.1093/ref:odnb/69650. (Subscription, Wikipedia Library access or UK public library membership required.)(subscription required)
- Hawkins, John (1853). A General History of the Science and Practice of Music. Vol. 1. London: Novello.
- Lasocki, David (May 1999). "The Recorder in Print, 1997". American Recorder. 40 (3). American Recorder Society: 9–15.
- Newman, William S (1957). "Ravenscroft and Corelli". Music and Letters. 38 (4). Oxford University Press: 369–70. doi:10.1093/ml/XXXVIII.4.369.
- Rowland-Jones, Anthony (1995). "The baroque recorder sonata". In Thomson, John Mansfield (ed.). The Cambridge Companion to the Recorder. Cambridge Companions to Music. Cambridge: Cambridge University Press. pp. 51–73. ISBN 0-521-35269-X.
