= Galeazzo Sabbatini =

Italian composer and music theorist

Galeazzo Sabbatini (1597–1662) was an Italian composer and music theorist, born in Pesaro, Italy. Sabbatini studied with Vincenzo Pellegrini, a canon who worked at the local cathedral as musician. He was elected to succeed Pellegrini in 1626 and in 1641. From 1630 to 1639 he was chapel master (maestro di cappella) to the Duke of Mirandola.

Galeazzo's most notable contributions to music theory include a treatise on continuo playing, published in 1628, and a method for tuning. As a composer, he was less known, with most of his compositions consisting of motets and madrigals.

== Works, editions and recordings ==
Works

- Sabbatini, G. Regola Facile e Breve per Sonare Sopra il Basso Continuo.. Venezia, 1628.
- Sabbatini, G. Il Secondo Libro de Madrigali. Concertati a Due, Tre, et Quattro, Voci.
- Sabbatini, G. Sacrarum Laudum Musicis Conceptibus. Contextarum Binis, Ternis, Quaternis, Quinisq[ue] Vocibus ad Organum concinendarum Liber Secundus. Opus Septimum.

Recordings

- Duets: Udite, o selve. Fulmina da la bocca. Emma Kirkby and Judith Nelson L'Oiseau-Lyre 436 861-2 1980.
- Congregavit Dominus aquas for soprano and bc. Recording on collection Amorous in Music: William Cavendish in Antwerp. Angharad Gruffydd Jones - soprano Concordia, Mark Levy Etcetera 2006
