= Simon Ives =

English composer and organist

Simon Ives (sometimes spelled Yves or Ive or Ivy) (1600 - 1662) was an English composer and organist who was active in the court of Charles I of England. He composed many pastoral dialogues, partsongs, glees, and works for organ. He also composed music for the theatre, and a considerable amount of music for solo lyra viol or that was transcribed for lyra viol.
