= John Ravenscroft (composer) =

English Baroque composer (c.1665–1697)

John Ravenscroft (c. 1665 – 12 October 1697), also known as Giovanni Ravenscroft and Giovanni Rederi, was an English violinist and composer of the Baroque era, who moved to Rome. He was possibly a pupil of Arcangelo Corelli, by whom he was strongly influenced, and around the middle of the 18th century some of Ravenscroft's trio sonatas were misattributed to Corelli. He is not to be confused with the English wait John Ravenscroft (fl. c. 1730).

== Biography ==
Ravenscroft was born c. 1665, in London. He moved to Rome, where in 1695 he published his Opus 1 under the name "Giovanni Ravenscroft, alias Rederi, Inglese".

He died in Rome on 12 October 1697, leaving a collection of 5 violins and 44 paintings.

== Works ==
Opus 1 consisted of 12 church trio sonatas. A surviving manuscript score simply ascribes them to an English pupil of Arcangelo Corelli, and the influence of Corelli's own sonatas is evident. Around 1730, claiming them to be early works by Corelli, the Amsterdam printer Michel-Charles Le Cène published nine of the sonatas from Ravenscroft's Opus 1 with a spurious Corelli opus number of 7. The error was pointed out by John Hawkins in 1776 in his General History of the Science and Practice of Music:

In short, these Sonatas, in the title-page whereof the reader is told that they are believed to have been composed by Arcangelo Corelli before his other works, are no other than nine of twelve Sonatas for two violins and a bass, composed by a countryman of ours resident in Italy, and which were published with this title, Sonate a tre, doi Violini, [e] Violone, o Arcileuto col Basso per l'Organo. Dedicate all' Altezza Serenissima di Ferdinando III. Gran Prencipe di Toscana. Da Giovanni Ravenscroft, alias Rederi, Inglese, Opera Prima. In Roma, per il Mascardi, 1695. [italics added]

Ravenscroft's Opus 2 was published posthumously in London in 1708. It consisted of 6 chamber trio sonatas, of which the last was a chaconne.

== See also ==
- Robert Valentine (composer), Ravenscroft's English contemporary who also moved to Rome.
