= Pierre-Joseph Roussier =

French Musicologist

Pierre Joseph Roussier (1716 - Aug 18, 1792) was a French musicologist and theorist known as the proponent of Rameau's theories and expert on Chinese music.

== Works ==
=== Written Works ===
Sources:

- Observations sur différents points d’harmonie (1765)
- Traité des accords et de leur succession selon le système de la basse fondamentale (1764)
- Mémoire sur la musique des anciens (1770)
- L’Harmonie pratique (1775)
- Notes et observations sur le mémoire du P. Amiot concernant la musique des chinois (1779)
- Mémoire sur la nouvelle harpe de M. Cousineau (1782)
- Mémoire sur le clavecin chromatique (1782)
- Lettre sur l’acceptation des mots “basse fondamentale” (1783)

== Citations ==
- The Theoretical Writings of Abbé Pierre-Joseph Roussier, Richard Dale Osborne · 1966
