= John Lenton =

English composer, violinist and singer (d. 1719)

John Lenton (before 4 March 1657 – May 1719) was an English composer, violinist, and singer.

Little is known about his early life however, scholars believe he may have been the John Linton baptized on 4 March 1657 at St Andrew, Holborn. On 2 August 1681 he was appointed to King Charles II's famed troupe of 24 violinists (part of the King's Musick, which comprised the musicians of the royal court) to replace a member who had died; he served as a member of the troupe for the remainder of his life. Lenton played at the coronations of James II, William III, and Mary II. Besides performing, he also contributed to the royal court's repertoire, composing suites to celebrate William III's return to London around 1697 and to celebrate the new year of 1699. He juggled his demands with the King's Musick with duties at the Chapel Royal (where he probably became acquainted with Henry Purcell), of which he was appointed Extraordinary Gentleman on 10 November 1685 and Groom of the Vestry in 1708. Lenton found time outside royal service to compose at least 12 suites for plays produced between 1682 and 1705, mostly for Thomas Betterton's theatre company at Lincoln's Inn Fields.

Lenton's later life mostly consisted of editing, writing, and publishing. In 1692, he collaborated with his fellow court musician Thomas Tollett to publish A Consort of Musick of Three Parts. Its sequel, A Three Part Consort of New Musick (1697), became popular enough to warrant three editions. Lenton also edited the fourth volume of Wit and Mirth, or Pills to Purge Melancholy (1706) and the second volume of The Dancing Master (1710).

Perhaps Lenton's most notable work is The Gentleman's Diversion (1693), which he partially engraved himself. This publication is one of the earliest known extant violin treatises. Scholars had thought that no copies of the work survived, but in 1982, a copy of the first edition was found at the Cardiff public library. At the time, it was proclaimed that Lenton had "the honourable (if perhaps temporary) distinction of having written the earliest extant treatise on violin playing in any language." Written for amateurs and beginners, the treatise spends a considerable amount of text explaining basic music principles and notation before making recommendations on holding the instrument, fingering and bowing. The work also contains 28 "Easie Lessons" as practice pieces, many composed by Lenton's colleagues at the royal court.

Lenton died sometime before 13 May 1719, when his replacement was named to the King's Musick. His widow, Anne, received ownership of his estate on 21 May.
