= Giorgio Antoniotto =

Italian musician (1681–1776)

Giorgio Antoniotto (Giorgio Antoniotto d’Adurni; 1680–1766), was an Italian musician, who is noted as the author of a musical treatise, L’arte armonica, and as an early composer of music for violoncello.

== Birth, ancestry, and early life ==
A descendant of a Milanese branch of the noble Genoese Adorno family, Giorgio Antoniotto was born in Milan in 1680 to Bernardo Antoniotto and Maria Teresa Pavitte. His baptism, reported in the records of the church of S. Matthia della Moneta, took place on May 10, 1681.

He was well educated and became highly accomplished in the arts, languages, mathematics, and music. A Spanish sympathizer against the Austrians in the War of the Spanish Succession, he was forced to flee Italy and entered the Spanish service where he was engaged many times but not wounded. Leaving the Spanish service, he taught in the arts at Geneva, frequenting the courts of Europe at Vienna, Paris, Madrid, and Lisbon.

== Marriage and family ==
In Paris, he married a lady named Percival and they had several children, all of whom died in their infancy. His wife also died, leaving him a widower. The given name of his wife and details of the children's lives have not been found.

== Later life ==
At Paris, presumably as the result of a duel, he suffered an injury to his hand with a sword. As a consequence of this injury, he gave up the violin in favor of the violoncello.

Antoniotto is credited with negotiating for the Queen of Spain, Elisabeth of Parma, the arrangement by which Farinelli (Carlo Maria Broschi), a famed castrato, moved from London in 1737 to sing for the rest of his performing career at the Spanish court.

Antoniotto traveled frequently to England and it was there that in 1760 he published his book L’arte armonica, written in Italian but translated and published in English. The preface to this book was translated by Samuel Pegge.

== L’arte armonica ==
In L’arte armonica, Antoniotto proposes a compositional system using as immovable bass the first and fifth scale degrees in the tonality of the piece, which he terms principal and guide. Related to this immovable foundation, he generates a fundamental counterpoint for harmonic progression and as a foundation for the fundamental harmony which gives rise to the chordal structures and melodic contours of the music.

Giorgio Antoniotto died at Calais in 1766.

== Works ==
- L’arte armonica, or a treatise on the composition of musick 3 books, 2 vols., bound as one. (London: John Johnson, 1760)
- Sonata a violoncello e basso Unpublished manuscript, Durham Cathedral, MS E. 24(v), iv.6.
- Concerto por Violoncello Parte Principale con 4° Violini e due Alto Viole, Basso Continuo e Fondamento per Cimbalo, e Contra Basso . Durham Cathedral MS E.27.
- XII Sonate, le Prima Cinque a Violoncello e Basso, e le Altre Sette a due Viioloncelli Overo due Viole de Gamba

Amsterdam: Le Cène, no date but listed in 1737 catalog)
