= Antimo Liberati =

Italian music theorist and composer (1617 - 1692)

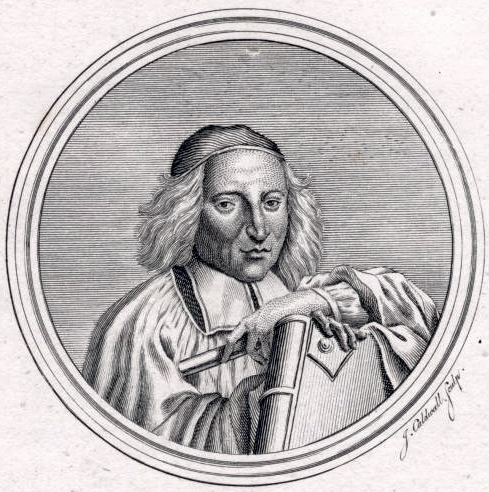
- Born: 3 April 1617; Foligno, Italy
- Died: 24 February 1692 (aged 74); Rome, Italy
- Occupations: music theorist; composer; singer

Antimo Liberati (3 April 1617 – 24 February 1692) was an Italian music theorist and composer.

Born in Foligno, Liberati began his musical training began in Rome in 1628 when he was admitted to the choir of San Giovanni in Laterano, at the time under the direction of Antonio Maria Abbatini. He also studied law and fine arts and for a time worked as a notary in Foligno.

From 1637 to 1643, Liberati was a court musician in the service of Emperor Ferdinand III and Archduke Leopold in Vienna. He was appointed a member of the Sistine Chapel Choir in 1662, served as its secretary (puntatore) in 1670 and its maestro di cappella in 1674 and 1675. He composed numerous pieces of sacred music of which 22 survive.

However, he was primarily known for his writings on music theory, especially Epitome della musica (1666) and Lettera scritta dal sig. Antimo Liberati in risposta ad una del sig. Ovidio Persapegi (1685). The diary which he produced in his year as puntatore of the Sistine Chapel Choir is considered an invaluable source of information on the singers of his day and the workings of the choir.

Liberati died in Rome, at the age of 74 and was buried in the tomb of the papal singers in Santa Maria in Vallicella. In his will, he left his music scores to the Foligno Cathedral.
