= 1729 in music =

List of years in music	(table)
- … 1719; 1720; 1721; 1722; 1723; 1724; 1725; 1726; 1727; 1728; 1729; 1730; 1731; 1732; 1733; 1734; 1735; 1736; 1737; 1738; 1739 …
- Art; Archaeology; Architecture; Literature; Music; Philosophy; Science; +...

The year 1729 in music involved some significant events.

== Events ==
- George Frideric Handel becomes co-manager of the King's Theatre, London.
- Pietro Locatelli settles in Amsterdam, where he will spend the rest of his life.
- Johann Sebastian Bach premieres his First Köthen Funeral Music at Evening on March 23 and his Funeral Cantata Klagt, Kinder, klagt es aller Welt, BWV 244a before midday on March 24 both at the St. James Church, Köthen for the funeral services of his former employer, Leopold, Prince of Anhalt-Köthen.
- April 15 Johann Sebastian Bach repeats his St Matthew Passion BWV 244b (BC D 3a) St. Thomas Church, Leipzig

== Classical music ==
- Johann Sebastian Bach – Sehet, wir geh'n hinauf gen Jerusalem, BWV 159, Premiered Feb. 27 in Leipzig
- John Baston – 6 Recorder Concertos
- Joseph Bodin de Boismortier – 5 Sonatas and Concerto for Cello, Viola or Bassoon, Op. 26
- Antonio Caldara
  - Naboth, sacred oratorio
  - Vicino a un rivoletto (published in 12 Cantatas, GB-Lcm MS 104)
- Fortunato Chelleri – 6 Fuge per l'Organo e 6 Sonate per il Cembalo
- Michel Richard Delalande – Motets de feu De La Lande (Motets of the late De La Lande), a collection of grand motets
- John Loeillet – 12 Solos, Op.3 (for Recorder and basso continuo)
- Jean-Joseph Mouret – Symphony de Fanfare
- Nicolas Pacotat - Delicta quis intelligit, a mass for four voices
- Georg Philipp Telemann
  - Der getreue Music-Meister (editor, continued from 1728) Hamburg: [Telemann].
  - Ein Mensch ist in seinem Leben, TWV 4:18
- Antonio Vivaldi
  - 6 Flute Concertos, Op.10
  - Op. 12, a collection of violin concerti, published in Amsterdam
  - Cello Concerto in B minor, RV 424
- Andrea Zani – 6 Sinfonias and 6 Concertos, Op.2
- Jan Dismas Zelenka – Laudate pueri, ZWV 81

== Opera ==
- Tomaso Albinoni – La fortezza al cimento
- Giovanni Battista Costanzi – Carlo Magno
- John Gay – The Beggar's Opera
- George Frederic Handel – Lotario, premiered Dec. 2 in London
- Johann Adolf Hasse – Tigrane
- Giovanni Battista Mancini – Endimione
- Giuseppe Maria Orlandini – Adelaide, premiered Feb. 8 in Venice
- Nicola Porpora – Semiramide riconosciuta, first version premiered Dec. 26 in Venice
- Leonardo Vinci – Semiramide riconosciuta, premiered Feb. 6 in Rome
- Antonio Vivaldi – L'Atenaide, RV 702, premiered Dec. 29 in Florence

== Births ==
- April 13 – Thomas Percy, lyricist and ballad-writer (died 1811)
- May 3 – Florian Leopold Gassmann, opera composer (died 1774)
- May 23 – Giuseppe Parini, poet and librettist (died 1799)
- September 29 – Georg Wilhelm Gruber composer (died 1796)
- October 1 – Anton Adlgasser, composer (died 1777)
- October 16 – Pierre van Maldere, violinist and composer (died 1768)
- October 17 – Pierre-Alexandre Monsigny, composer (died 1817)
- December 1 – Giuseppe Sarti, opera composer (died 1802)
- December 3 – Antonio Soler, composer (died 1783)
- Date Unknown
  - Antoine Albanèse, composer (died 1800)
  - John Cunningham, librettist and playwright (died 1773)
  - Pietro Pompeo Sales, composer (died 1797)
  - Ignatius Sancho, composer (died 1780)

== Deaths ==
- January 19 – William Congreve, librettist (born 1670)
- July 16 – Johann David Heinichen, German composer (born 1683)
- June 27 – Élisabeth Jacquet de La Guerre, French harpsichordist and composer (b. 1665)
- July 31 – Nicola Francesco Haym, Roman opera librettist, composer and bibliographer working in London (born 1678)
- September 17 – Giovanni Antonio Guido, composer (born 1680)
- November 22 – Pieter Bustijn, composer (born 1648)
- date unknown
  - Attilio Ariosti, Bolognese composer working in London (born 1666)
  - Liebhold, composer (born c. 1670)
  - Vaughan Richardson, composer and organist
