= 1730 in music =

List of years in music	(table)
- … 1720; 1721; 1722; 1723; 1724; 1725; 1726; 1727; 1728; 1729; 1730; 1731; 1732; 1733; 1734; 1735; 1736; 1737; 1738; 1739; 1740 …
- Art; Archaeology; Architecture; Literature; Music; Philosophy; Science; +...

The year 1730 in music involved some significant events.

== Events ==
- The Beggar's Opera by John Gay is so popular that a deck of playing cards based on the characters is printed.
- Antonio Vivaldi and his family arrive in Prague.
- André Campra becomes Inspector General of the Paris Opera.
- April 7 Johann Sebastian Bach premieres his copy of the anonymous St Luke Passion BWV 246 (BC D 6) at St. Nicholas Church, Leipzig.]

== Published music ==
- George Frideric Handel – Sonates pour un Traversiere un Violon ou Hautbois Con Basso Continuo Composées par G. F. Handel (Amsterdam: Jeanne Roger), actually a forgery by John Walsh in London—Jeanne Roger had died in 1722

== Classical music ==
- Johann Sebastian Bach
  - Jauchzet Gott in allen Landen, BWV 51
  - Nun danket alle Gott, BWV 192
  - Lukaspassion, BWV 246 (now attributed to Johann Melchior Molter)
  - Organ Sonata No. 1 in E-flat major, BWV 525
  - Organ Sonata No. 3 in D minor, BWV 527
  - Organ Sonata No. 6 in G major, BWV 530
  - Partita in E minor, BWV 830
  - Violin Sonata in G major, BWV 1021
  - 3 Sonatas for Viola da Gamba and Harpsichord, BWV 1027-1029
  - Violin Concerto in A minor, BWV 1041
  - Concerto for 2 Harpsichords in C minor, BWV 1060
- Francesco Barsanti – 9 Overtures, Op. 4
- Joseph Bodin de Boismortier
  - 6 Suites and 2 Sonatas, Op. 27
  - 6 Sonates en trio suivies de concertos, Op. 28
  - Diverses pièces de viole avec la basse chiffrée, Op. 31
- Antonio Caldara – La Passione di Gesù Cristo
- François Couperin – Pièces de clavecin, book 4
- Philippe Courbois – Recueil d'airs sérieux et à boire à une et deux voix
- Carl Heinrich Graun
  - Ein Lämmlein geht und trägt die Schuld (Passion cantata)
  - Kommt her und schauet (Passion oratorio)
- George Frideric Handel
  - Allegro in D minor, HWV 475
- Leo Leonardo – 14 Toccate
- Benedetto Marcello – Requiem "In the Venetian Manner"
- Johan Helmich Roman – Assaggio in G minor, BeRI 314 and 320
- Thomas Roseingrave – XII Solos
- Georg Philipp Telemann
  - Fast allgemeines Evangelisch-Musicalisches Lieder-Buch
  - Matthäus-Passion, TWV 5:15
  - Nouvelles sonatines
  - 6 Quadri a violino, flauto traversiere, viola da gamba o violoncello, e fondamento: ripartiti in 2. concerti, 2. balletti, 2. suonate, Hamburg: [Telemann] ("Paris Quartets" Nos. 1–6), TWV 43:G1, 43:D1, 43:A1, 43:g1, 43:e1, 43:h1
  - Violin Concerto, TWV 51:G8
- Johann Theile – Ach dass ich hören sollte
- Antonio Vivaldi
  - Trio Sonata in C major, RV 82
  - Chamber Concerto in D major, RV 93
  - Violin Concerto in D major, RV 206
  - Bassoon Concerto in C major, RV 473
  - Bassoon Concerto in C major, RV 477
  - Bassoon Concerto in A minor, RV 500
  - Concerto in G major, RV 575
  - Fonti di pianto piangete, RV 656
  - Par che tardo oltre il costume, RV 662
  - Qual per ignoto calle, RV 677
- Jan Dismas Zelenka
  - I penitenti al sepolcro del redentore, ZWV 63
  - Haec dies quam fecit Dominus, ZWV 169

== Opera ==
- Francesco Araia – Berenice
- Riccardo Broschi – Idaspe
- Antonio Caldara – Enone
- Giovanni Battista Costanzi – L'Eupatra
- Francesco Feo – Andromaca
- George Frideric Handel – Partenope, HWV 27
- Johann Adolf Hasse
  - Arminio
  - Artaserse
  - Dalisa
- Nicola Antonio Porpora – Mitridate
- Joseph-Nicolas-Pancrace Royer – Pyrrhus
- Leonardo Vinci
  - Alessandro nell'Indie, premiered Jan. 2 in Rome
  - Artaserse
- Antonio Vivaldi – Argippo

== Births ==
- February 23 – Cristiano Giuseppe Lidarti, composer (died c. 1793)
- April 21 – Antonin Kammel, composer (died 1788)
- May 29 – William Jackson, organist (died 1803)
- June 14 – Antonio Sacchini, opera composer (died 1786)
- September 7 – Elisabetta de Gambarini, composer (died 1765)
- December 14 – Capel Bond, organist and composer (died 1790)
- date unknown
  - Theodore Aylward Sr., organist (died 1801)
  - Pasquale Errichelli, organist and composer (died 1785)
  - Domenico Gallo, violinist and composer (died c. 1768)

== Deaths ==
- March 17 – Antonín Reichenauer, composer (born c.1694)
- March 22 – Benedetto Pamphili, Italian cardinal, patron of the arts, composer and librettist (born 1653)
- April 10 – Sébastien de Brossard, music theorist (born 1655)
- May 27 – Leonardo Vinci, composer (born 1690)
- June 19 – Jean-Baptiste Loeillet of London (born 1680)
- August 31 – Gottfried Finger, composer (born c. 1655)
- October 15 – Jean Baptiste Senaillé, virtuoso violinist and composer (born 1687)
- date unknown
  - William Hine, organist and composer (born 1687)
  - Carlo Annibale Tononi, luthier (born 1675)
- probable
  - Filippo Amadei, composer
  - Charles Piroye, composer (born c.1670)

== Sources ==
- Pitou, Spire (1983). The Paris Opéra: an encyclopedia of operas, ballets, composers, and performers (3 volumes). Westport, Connecticut: Greenwood Press. ISBN 978-0-686-46036-7.
- Sadie, Stanley, editor (1992). The new Grove dictionary of opera (4 volumes). London: Macmillan. ISBN 978-1-56159-228-9.
