= 1731 in music =

List of years in music	(table)
- … 1721; 1722; 1723; 1724; 1725; 1726; 1727; 1728; 1729; 1730; 1731; 1732; 1733; 1734; 1735; 1736; 1737; 1738; 1739; 1740; 1741 …
- Art; Archaeology; Architecture; Literature; Music; Philosophy; Science; +...

This is a list of notable events in music that took place in the year 1731.

== Events ==
- The Academy of Vocal Music changes its name to the Academy of Ancient Music.
- Jean-Philippe Rameau meets his patron, La Pouplinière.
- Antonio Stradivari makes a viola that will be owned a hundred years later by Niccolò Paganini.
- Antonio Vivaldi returns to Venice.
- March 23 Johann Sebastian Bach premieres his St Mark Passion BWV 247 (BC D 4) at St. Thomas Church, Leipzig.

== Classical music ==
- William Babell – Prelude in F major, IWB 10
- Carl Phillip Emanuel Bach
  - Keyboard Sonata in B-flat major, H. 2, Wq. 62/1
  - Trio Sonata in D minor, H. 569, Wq. 145 (formerly attributed to J.S. Bach as BWV 1036)
  - Trio Sonata in C major, H. 571, Wq. 147
- Johann Sebastian Bach
  - Wir danken dir, Gott, wir danken dir, BWV 29
  - Der Herr ist mein getreuer Hirt, BWV 112 (premiered Apr. 8 in Leipzig)
  - Komm, Jesu, komm, BWV 229
  - Wachet auf, BWV 140 (premiered Nov. 25 in Leipzig)
  - Orchestral Suite No.3 in D major, BWV 1068
- Jean Barrière – Sonatas for Pardessus de viole, Livre 5
- Joseph Bodin de Boismortier
  - 6 Gentillesses en 3 parties, Op. 33
  - 6 Sonates à quatre parties, Op. 34
  - 6 Suites de pièces, Op.35
- Louis de Caix d'Hervelois
  - Collection of flute pieces
  - 4 Suites de pièces pour la viole, Op. 3
- Antonio Caldara – David umiliato
- Louis-Antoine Dornel – Pièces de clavecin
- Christoph Graupner
  - Trio Sonata in E minor, GWV 209
  - Flute Concerto in D major, GWV 312
  - Concerto for Flute d'amore, Oboe d'amore and Viola d'amore in G major, GWV 333
- George Frideric Handel – Minuet in G major, HWV 530
- Michele Mascitti – 12 Violin Sonatas, Op. 8
- Johann Joachim Quantz – 6 Flute Sonatas, RISM Q. 33
- Giuseppe Tartini
  - Pastorale in A major, B.A16
  - Violin Sonata in G major, B.G17
  - Violin Sonata in G minor, B.g10 "Didone abbandonata"
- Georg Philipp Telemann
  - Abscheuliche Tiefe des großen Verderbens, TWV 1:9
  - Der mit Sünden beleidigte Heiland, TWV 1:306
  - Nach Finsternis und Todesschatten, TWV 1:1150
  - Fortsetzung des Harmonischen Gottes-Dienstes
- Jan Dismas Zelenka – Missa Sancti Josephi, ZWV 14

== Opera ==
- Tommaso Albinoni – Fano
- Francesco Corradini – Con amor non hay libertad
- Francesco Corselli – Venere placata
- Carl Heinrich Graun – Iphigenia in Aulis
- George Frideric Handel
  - Poro, re dell'Indie, HWV 28
  - Rinaldo, HWV 7b (revised 1711 version)
- Johann Adolf Hasse
  - Cajo Fabricio
  - Cleofide
- Giovanni Battista Pergolesi – La conversione e morte di San Guglielmo
- Nicola Porpora – Poro
- Antonio Vivaldi – Semiramide, RV 733

== Theoretical publications ==
- Johann Mattheson – Grosse General-Baß-Schule

== Births ==
- August 4 – Giuseppe Colla, composer (died 1806)
- November 27 – Gaetano Pugnani, composer (died 1798)
- December 8 – František Xaver Dušek, harpsichordist, pianist and composer (died 1799)
- December 28 – Christian Cannabich, composer (died 1798)

== Deaths ==
- January 27 – Bartolomeo Cristofori, inventor of an early form of piano (born 1655)
- May 1 (buried) – Johann Ludwig Bach, violinist and composer (born 1677)
- July 5 (buried) – Jakob Greber, composer and musician (date of birth unknown)
- November – Johann Caspar Wilcke, musician and father of Anna Magdalena Bach
- December 26 – Antoine Houdar de la Motte, librettist (born 1672)
