= 1738 in music =

List of years in music	(table)
- … 1728; 1729; 1730; 1731; 1732; 1733; 1734; 1735; 1736; 1737; 1738; 1739; 1740; 1741; 1742; 1743; 1744; 1745; 1746; 1747; 1748 …
- Art; Archaeology; Architecture; Literature; Music; Philosophy; Science; +...

== Events ==
- January – Antonio Vivaldi conducts a festival to celebrate the 100th anniversary of the opening of the Schouwburg theater.
- 4 May – Foundation of the Imperial Ballet School at Saint Petersburg, with Jean-Baptiste Landé as its principal.
- Carl Philipp Emanuel Bach, having completed a law degree, is hired as a court musician by Crown Prince Frederick of Prussia, the future Frederick the Great (Bach will remain in Frederick's service until 1768).

== Classical music ==
- Johann Sebastian Bach
  - Kyrie–Gloria masses, BWV 233–236
  - Harpsichord Concerto No.3 in D major, BWV 1054
- Francesco Durante – Messa piccola di requiem in G
- George Frideric Handel – La bianca rosa, HWV 160c
- Leonardo Leo
  - Cello Concerto in A major, L.50
  - Cello Concerto in D minor, L.60
- Jan Dismas Zelenka – Miserere, ZWV 57

== Opera ==
- Thomas Arne – Comus
- Antonio Bioni – Girita
- François Francoeur and François Rebel – Le Ballet de la paix (Paris, Opéra, 29 May)
- George Frideric Handel
  - Faramondo
  - Saul (composed, first performed 1739)
  - Serse (London, 15 April)
- Johann Adolph Hasse – Irene
- Giovanni Battista Pescetti – La Conquista del Vello D'Oro
- Nicola Porpora – Carlo il Calvo
- Giovanni Porta – Ifigenia in Aulide
- Francesco Maria Veracini – Rosalinda

== Publications ==
- Joseph Bodin de Boismortier – L'Automne, Op. 5, No. 3 (extract, reprinted from Cantates françoises, Op. 5 [1724])
- Josse Boutmy – Pièces de clavecin, Livre 1
- Giuseppe Antonio Brescianello – 12 Concertos, Op. 1
- Michele Corrette
  - L'école d'Orphée, Op. 18 (Paris)
  - Les délices de la solitude, Op. 20 (Paris)
- George Frideric Handel – 6 Organ Concertos, Op.4 (London: John Walsh)
- Alessandro Marcello – La cetra di Eterio Stinfalico, 6 concertos for 2 oboes or flutes, strings, and basso continuo (Augsburg, [approximate year])
- Domenico Scarlatti
  - Essercizi per Gravicembalo, K.1-30
  - 42 Suites de Pièces pour le Clavecin, K.1-42 (introduction by Roseingrave)
- Giuseppe Sammartini – 6 Concerti Grossi, Op. 2
- Georg Philipp Telemann
  - Fugues légères & petits jeux, TWV 30:21–26
  - 18 Canons Mélodieux, TWV 40:118–123
  - 6 Nouveaux quatuors en six suites: à une flûte traversiere, un violon, une basse de viole, où violoncel, et basse continuë. Paris: L'auteur, Vater, Boivin, et Le Clerc. ("Paris quartets" Nos. 7–12), TWV 43:D3, 43:a2, 43:G4, 43:h2, 43:A3, 43:e4
- Johann Gottfried Walther – Harmonisches Denck- und Danckmahl
- 6 Harpsichord Concertos and 4 Organ Fugues (Strasbourg: Jean Daniel Doulsecker) works by various and anonymous composers. Contains Wilhelm Friedemann Bach's Fugue in F major F.36.

== Methods and theory writings ==
- Johann Philipp Eisel – Musicus autodidaktos

== Births ==
- April 17 – Philip Hayes, composer (died 1797)
- May – Jonathan Battishill, composer (died 1801)
- June 3 – Pierre Vachon, composer (died 1803)
- August 11 (baptized)– Anna Bon, composer (died after 1769)
- August 14 – Leopold Hofmann, composer (died 1793)
- October 26 – Louis-Charles-Joseph Rey, composer and cellist, (died 1811)
- November 15 – William Herschel, astronomer and composer (died 1822)
- December 14 – Jan Antonín Koželuh, composer (died 1814)
- date unknown
  - Carlo Besozzi, oboist and composer (died 1791)
  - Thomas Ebdon, organist and composer (died 1811)

== Deaths ==
- January 6 – Franz Xaver Murschhauser, German composer (born 1663)
- January 17 – Jean-François Dandrieu, harpsichordist, organist and composer (born c. 1682)
- March 25 – Turlough O'Carolan, harpist and composer (born 1670)
- July 20 – Tommaso Redi, composer (born c.1675)
- August 23 – Baron Anders von Düben, director of the Royal Swedish Orchestra (born 1673)
- August 29 – Georg Reutter, organist and composer (born 1656)
- September 23 – Carlo Agostino Badia, opera composer (born 1672)
- December 22 – Jean-Joseph Mouret, composer (born 1681)
- date unknown – José de Torres, composer (born 1665)
