= 1723 in music =

| List of years in music | (table) |
- … 1713; 1714; 1715; 1716; 1717; 1718; 1719; 1720; 1721; 1722; 1723; 1724; 1725; 1726; 1727; 1728; 1729; 1730; 1731; 1732; 1733 …
- Art; Archaeology; Architecture; Literature; Music; Philosophy; Science; +...

The year 1723 in music involved some significant events.

== Events ==
- April 13 – Johann Sebastian Bach is given permission to leave Köthen to take up his new appointment (from May 5) as cantor and musical director of St. Thomas Church, Leipzig. Other candidates for the post included Georg Friedrich Kauffmann, Georg Philipp Telemann and Christoph Graupner.
- July/August – Handel moves to 25 Brook Street, London, the modern-day Handel House Museum.
- November 2 – J. S. Bach's cantata Höchsterwünschtes Freudenfest, BWV 194 is first performed for dedication of the church and organ at Störmthal.
- December 26 – J. S. Bach's cantata Darzu ist erschienen der Sohn Gottes, BWV 40 is first performed in Leipzig.
- Alessandro Scarlatti begins his last major work, a serenata for the marriage of the prince of Stigliano, which will be left unfinished at his death.
- Publication of Opinioni de' cantori antichi e moderni by Pier Francesco Tosi.
- Francesco Maria Veracini returns to Florence after a period in Germany.
- Antonio Vandini and Giuseppe Tartini go into the service of Count Kinsky in Prague.

== Classical music ==
- Attilio Ariosti – Caio Marzio Coriolano
- Johann Sebastian Bach
  - Inventions and Sinfonias, BWV 772-801
  - Magnificat in E-flat major, BWV 243a
  - Fugue in C major, BWV 953
  - First cycle of church cantatas, on his first year of tenure as Thomaskantor:
    - Jesus nahm zu sich die Zwölfe, BWV 22
    - Du wahrer Gott und Davids Sohn, BWV 23
    - Es ist nichts Gesundes an meinem Leibe, BWV 25
    - Nun ist das Heil und die Kraft, BWV 50
    - Wer mich liebet, der wird mein Wort halten, BWV 59
    - O Ewigkeit, du Donnerwort, BWV 60
    - Sehet, welch eine Liebe, BWV 64
    - Lobe den Herrn, meine Seele, BWV 69a
    - Wachet! betet! betet! wachet!, BWV 70
    - Die Himmel erzählen die Ehre Gottes, BWV 76
    - Du sollt Gott, deinen Herren, lieben, BWV 77
    - Es reißet euch ein schrecklich Ende, BWV 90
    - Christus, der ist mein Leben, BWV 95
    - Herr, gehe nicht ins Gericht mit deinem Knecht, BWV 105
    - Preise, Jerusalem, den Herren, BWV 119
    - Erforsche mich, Gott, und erfahre mein Herz, BWV 136
    - Warum betrübst du dich, mein Herz, BWV 138
    - Herz und Mund und Tat und Leben, BWV 147
    - Bringet dem Herrn Ehre seines Namens, BWV 148
    - Ihr Menschen, rühmet Gottes Liebe, BWV 167
    - Ärgre dich, o Seele, nicht, BWV 186
    - Singet dem Herrn ein neues Lied, BWV 190
    - Höchsterwünschtes Freudenfest, BWV 194
    - Jesu, meine Freude, BWV 227
- Antonio Caldara – La concordia de' pianeti
- Louis-Antoine Dornel – Concerts de simphonies
- George Frideric Handel – Concerto Grosso in F major, HWV 331
- Jean-Marie Leclair – 12 Violin Sonatas, Op. 1
- John Loeillet – 6 Suites of Lessons for the Harpsichord
- Marin Marais
  - La Gamme et Autres Morceaux de Symphonie (inc. Sonnerie de Ste-Geneviève du Mont-de-Paris)
- Alessandro Scarlatti
  - 29 Partite sopra l’aria della Folia
  - Primo e Secondo Libro di Toccate per Cembalo
- Giovanni Battista Somis – 12 Violin Sonatas, Op. 2
- Georg Philipp Telemann
  - Hamburger Admiralitätsmusik (Hamburg Admiralty Music)
  - Overture-Suite in C major, TV 55:C3 "Wassermusik"
  - Siehe, es hat überwunden, TWV 1:1328 (attributed to J.S. Bach as BWV 219)
- Antonio Vivaldi – The Four Seasons (approximate date)
- Jan Dismas Zelenka
  - Concerto a 8 in G major
  - Proh, quos criminis, ZWV 172

== Opera ==
- Giovanni Bononcini – Erminia
- François Colin de Blamont – Les Festes grecques et romaines
- Francesco Feo – Morano e Rosina
- George Frideric Handel
  - Flavio
  - Ottone
- Leonardo Leo – La’mpeca scoperta
- Nicola Porpora
  - Adelaide
  - Imeneo in Atene
- Pietro Torri – Griselda
- Antonio Vivaldi – Ercole su'l Termodonte, RV 710

== Births ==
- April 25 – Giovanni Marco Rutini, composer (died 1797)
- July 11 – Jean-François Marmontel, librettist (died 1799)
- July 29 – Christlieb Siegmund Binder, composer (died 1789)
- November 9 – Princess Anna Amalia of Prussia, composer (died 1787)
- December 22 – Carl Friedrich Abel, composer (died 1787)
- date unknown
  - Pascal Taskin, harpsichord and piano maker (died 1793)
  - Francesco Uttini, conductor and composer (died 1795)
  - John Wainwright, composer (died 1768)

== Deaths ==
- February 7 – Carlo Francesco Pollarolo, composer (born c. 1653)
- August 21 – Dimitrie Cantemir, prince and polymath (born 1673)
- September 23 – William Babell, organist and composer (born 1690)
