= 1803 in music =

This is a list of music-related events in 1803.

== Events ==
- 5 April – first performance of Beethoven's Third Piano Concerto
- 26 December – Haydn performs his last public concert, conducting The Seven Last Words of Christ

== Classical music ==
- Ludwig van Beethoven
  - Violin Sonata No. 7 published, composed between 1801 and 1802
  - Violin Sonata No. 9 "Kreutzer"
  - Trio in E♭ major, Op. 38
  - 3 Marches, Op. 45
  - Piano Sonata No. 21 "Waldstein" started, Op. 53
  - Symphony No. 3 "Eroica", Op. 55 (started)
  - Christus am Ölberge, oratorio, Op. 85
  - Das Glück der Freundschaft, Op. 88
  - 10 Variations on 'Ich bin der Schneider Kakadu', Op. 121a
  - Minuet, WoO 82
- Johann Evangelist Brandl – Symphony in D major, Op. 25
- Bernhard Henrik Crusell – Concerto for Clarinet No. 3 in B♭ major
- Franz Danzi
  - Preiss Gottes, P.48
  - Sextet in E major, Op. 15
- Jan Ladislav Dussek – Piano Quartet in E♭ major Op. 53 or 56
- Anton Eberl – Symphony in E♭ major, Op. 33
- Joseph Haydn
  - unfinished String Quartet in D minor, Op. 103
  - 6 Trios, Liv. 1
- Jeremiah Ingalls – "Northfield"
- Franz Krommer
  - Concerto No.1 for 2 Clarinets, Op. 35
  - Clarinet Concerto No.1, Op. 36
  - Concerto for Oboe in F major (Op. 37)
  - Symphony No. 2, Op. 40
- Niccolo Paganini
  - Sonata concertata, MS 2
  - Grande sonata, MS 3
  - Le streghe, Op. 8
- Georg Pasterwitz – 300 Themata und Versetten, Op. 4
- Ignaz Pleyel – 3 Keyboard Trios, B.474–476
- Pierre Rode – Violin Concerto No.7 in A minor, Op. 9
- Bernard Romberg
  - Cello Concerto No.1, Op. 2
  - 3 Grand Sonatas, Op. 5
- Antonio Salieri – Gesù al limbo für Soli, vierstimmigen Chor und Orchester
- Louis Spohr – Violin Concerto in C major
- Giovanni Battista Viotti –
  - Trio for 2 Violins and Cello in E major
  - Trio for 2 Violins and Cello in G major
- Joseph Wölfl – Symphony in G minor, Op. 40

== Opera ==
- Gaetano Andreozzi – Il trionpho di Alessandro
- Luigi Cherubini – Anacréon
- Anton Fischer – Die Entlarvten
- Ferdinando Paër – Sargino
- Giovanni Paisiello – Proserpine
- Antonio Salieri – Die Hussiten vor Naumburg

== Births ==
- January 1 – Carolina Brunström, ballerina (d. 1855)
- January 6 – Henri Herz, pianist and composer (died 1888)
- February 17 – Joseph-Philippe Simon, librettist and actor (died 1891)
- April 2 – Franz Lachner, Bavarian composer/conductor (died 1890)
- April 12 – Anton Wilhelm von Zuccalmaglio, lyricist and composer (died 1869)
- May 12 – Alexandre Montfort, French composer (died 1856)
- June 24 – George James Webb, composer (died 1887)
- June 30 – Thomas Lovell Beddoes, librettist and poet (died 1849)
- July 8 – Julius Mosen, librettist and lawyer (died 1867)
- July 19 – Franz von Kobell, lyricist and mineralogist (died 1882)
- July 20 – Jakob Zeugheer, composer and violininst (died 1865)
- July 24 – Adolphe Adam, French composer (died 1856)
- July 25 – Ferdinand Beyer, arranger and composer (died 1863)
- September 4 – Anna Nielsen, mezzo-soprano (died 1856)
- September 12 – Auguste Brizeux lyricist and artist (died 1858)
- October 11 – Prosper Mérimée, lyricist and writer (died 1870)
- December 5 – Fyodor Tyutchev, lyricist and poet (died 1873)
- December 11 – Hector Berlioz, composer (died 1869)
- date unknown – Jan z Hvězdy, lyricist and writer (died 1853)

== Deaths ==
- January 17 – Franz Ignaz von Beecke, composer (born 1733)
- January 18 – Sylvain Maréchal, lyricist and writer (born 1750)
- January 28 – Karl von Marinelli, theatre manager (born 1745)
- February 5 – Giovanni Battista Casti, librettist and poet (born 1724)
- February 6 – Gasparo Angiolini, dancer, choreographer and composer (born 1731)
- February 16 – Giovanni Punto, composer and horn player (born 1746)
- February 18 – Johann Wilhelm Ludwig Gleim, lyricist and poet (born 1719)
- March 14 – Friedrich Gottlieb Klopstock, lyricist and poet (born 1724)
- May 8 – John Joseph Merlin, clock- and musical-instrument-maker and inventor (born 1735)
- June 6 – Louis Gallodier, dancer and choreographer (born c.1734)
- July 5 – William Jackson, composer and organist (born 1730)
- July 14 – Esteban Salas y Castro, Cuban composer (born 1725)
- August 29 – Giovanni de Gamerra, librettist and cleric (born 1742)
- September 5 – François Devienne, composer (born 1759)
- September 17 – Franz Xaver Süssmayr, composer (born 1766)
- September 21 – John Christopher Moller, composer and music publisher (born 1755)
- October 7 – Pierre Vachon, composer (born 1738)
- October 8 – Vittorio Alfieri, librettist and dramatist (born 1749)
- December 18 – Johann Gottfried Herder, lyricist and philosopher (born 1744)
- date unknown
  - Johann Becker, organist and composer (born 1726)
  - Johann Christoph Kellner, organist and composer (born 1736)
