= 1717 in music =

List of years in music	(table)
- … 1707; 1708; 1709; 1710; 1711; 1712; 1713; 1714; 1715; 1716; 1717; 1718; 1719; 1720; 1721; 1722; 1723; 1724; 1725; 1726; 1727 …
- Art; Archaeology; Architecture; Literature; Music; Philosophy; Science; +...

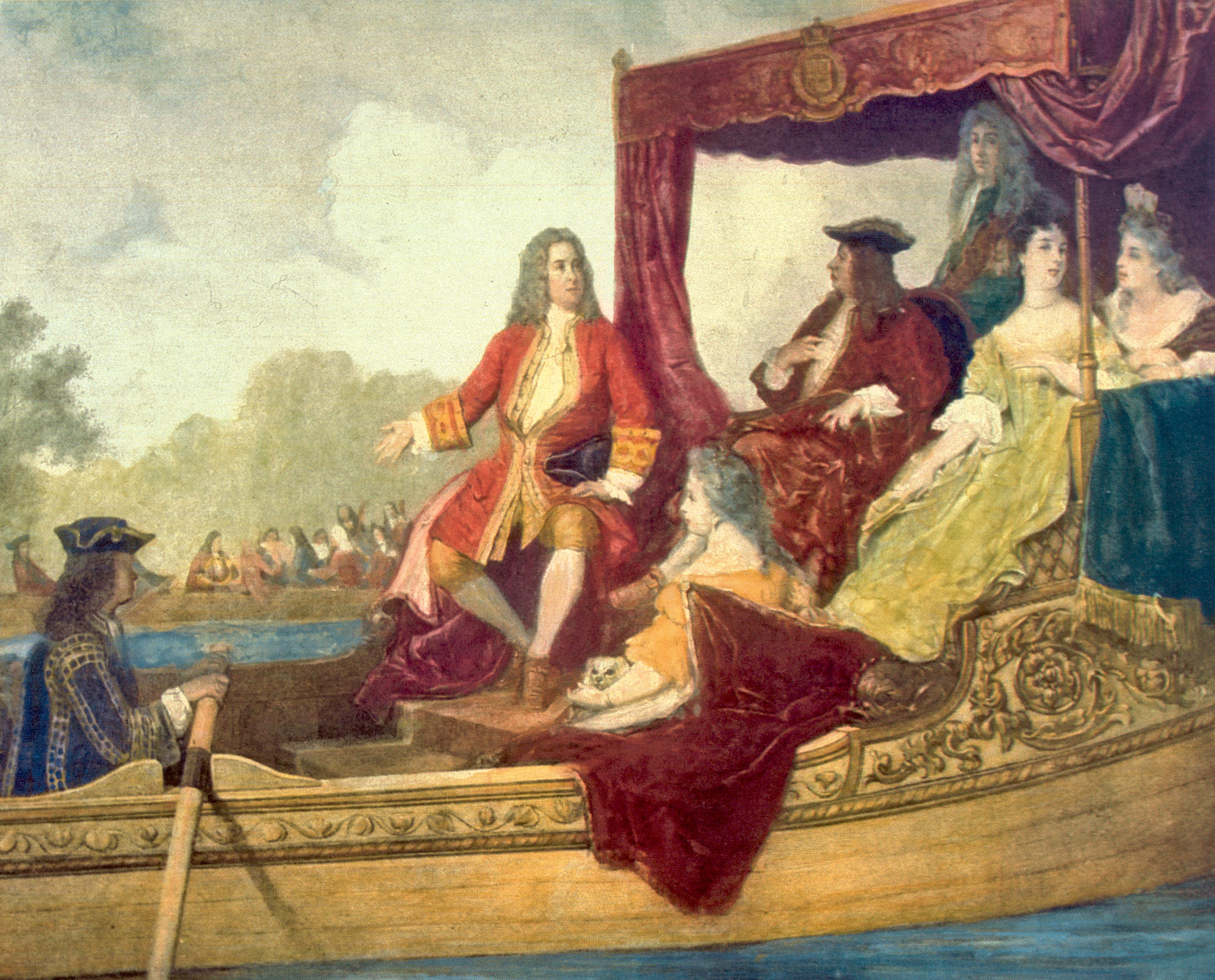
Painting of George Frideric Handel (left, with right arm extended) with King George I of Great Britain, traveling by barge on the Thames River while musicians play in the background. The painting is an artist's rendering of the first performance of Handel's Water Music in 1717.

The year 1717 in music involved some significant events.

== Events ==
- March 26 – Johann Sebastian Bach premieres his Weimarer Passion at the chapel of Friedrichstein Castle in Gotha
- July 13 – Domenico Zipoli arrives in Buenos Aires with 52 other Jesuit missionaries.
- July 17 – George Frideric Handel's Water Music is performed on the River Thames.
- August – Handel becomes house composer at Cannons.
- December 26 – Teatro Regio Ducale in Milan opens as an opera house.
- Johann Sebastian Bach is appointed Kapellmeister by Leopold, Prince of Anhalt-Köthen.
- Celebrated castrato Gaetano Berenstadt visits London and plays the lead in a revival of Handel's Rinaldo.

== Classical music ==
- Tomaso Albinoni – Violin Sonata in B-Flat Major, T. So 32
- William Babell – Suits of the most Celebrated Lessons
- Johann Sebastian Bach
  - 6 Kleine Präludien, BWV 933-938
  - 5 Kleine Präludien, BWV 939-943
  - Violin Sonata in B minor, BWV 1014
  - Violin Sonata in E major, BWV 1016
  - Violin Sonata in C minor, BWV 1017
  - Violin Sonata in F minor, BWV 1018
  - Violin Sonata in G major, BWV 1019
- Pietro G.G. Boni – Cello Sonata in C major, Op. 1
- François Chauvon – Tibiades
- François Couperin – Pièces de clavecin, book 2
- Charles Dieupart – 6 Sonatas for a Flute and a Through Bass
- Johann Friedrich Fasch – Brockes-Passion, FaWV F:1
- Christoph Graupner – Wie wunderbar ist Gottes Güte, GWV 1103/17
- Georg Friedrich Handel
  - Dolc' è pur d'amor l'affanno, HWV 109a
  - Mi palpita il cor, HWV 132b
  - O be Joyful in the Lord, HWV 246
  - In the Lord I Put My Trust, HWV 247
  - Have Mercy upon Me, O God, HWV 248
  - O Sing unto the Lord a New Song, HWV 249b
  - I Will Magnify Thee, HWV 250a
  - O Praise the Lord with One Consent, HWV 254
  - The Lord is My Light, HWV 255
  - Oboe Concerto in B-flat major, HWV 302a
  - Concerto Grosso in G major, HWV 314
  - Water Music HWV 348-350
  - Trio Sonata in C minor, HWV 386a
- Jacques Hotteterre – Suite in G major, Op. 6
- Jean-Baptiste Loeillet – 12 Sonatas, Op. 5
- Marin Marais – Pièces de viole, Livre 4
- Pierre-Danican Philidor – 12 Suites, Opp. 1-3
- Georg Philipp Telemann
  - Gott der Hoffnung erfülle euch, TWV 1:634 (formerly BWV 218)
  - Herr, sei mir gnädig, denn mir ist Angst, TWV 1:769
  - Ich bin der Erste und der Letzte, TWV 1:816
  - Sehet an die Exempel der Alten, TWV 1:1259
- Antonio Vandini – Cello Sonata in C major, IAV 5
- Antonio Vivaldi
  - Violin Sonata in C minor, RV 5
  - Concerto for Strings in C major, RV 114
  - Concerto for Strings in D major, RV 121
  - Concerto for Strings in D minor, RV 127
  - Concerto for 2 Oboes in C major, RV 534
  - Magnificat, RV 610
- John Weaver (choreographer; composers unknown) – The Loves of Mars and Venus (ballet)

== Opera ==
- Antonio Maria Bononcini – La conquista del vello d'oro
- Giuseppe Antonio Brescianello – Tisbe
- Antonio Caldara – La verità nell'inganno
- Leo Leonardo – Diana amante
- Alessandro Scarlatti – Telemaco
- Antonio Vivaldi
  - L'Incoronazione di Dario
  - Tieteberga, RV 737

== Births ==
- January 4 – Antonio Maria Mazzoni, composer (died 1785)
- April 9 – Georg Matthias Monn, composer (died 1750)
- June 18 – Johann Stamitz, violinist and composer (died 1757)
- June 27 – Giacomo Durazzo, operatic impresario (died 1794)
- date unknown
  - Leopold August Abel, violinist and composer (died 1794)
  - Elisabeth Lillström, Swedish operatic soprano (d. 1791)
  - William Williams Pantycelyn, Welsh hymn writer (died 1791)
- probable – Marimutthu Pillai, composer of Carnatic music (died c.1787)

== Deaths ==
- February 11 – Johann Jakob Walther, violinist and composer (born 1650)
- April 3 – Christian Friedrich Witt, composer, music editor and teacher (born c.1660)
- October 13 – Wolfgang Printz, composer and cantor (born 1641)
- November 26 – Daniel Purcell, composer (born 1664)
- date unknown
  - Pierre Bouteiller, composer (born 1655)
  - Goffredo Cappa, luthier (born 1644)
  - Friedrich Erhard Niedt, jurist, music theorist, and composer (born 1674)
- probable – Francisco Guerau, composer (born 1649)
