= 1797 in music =

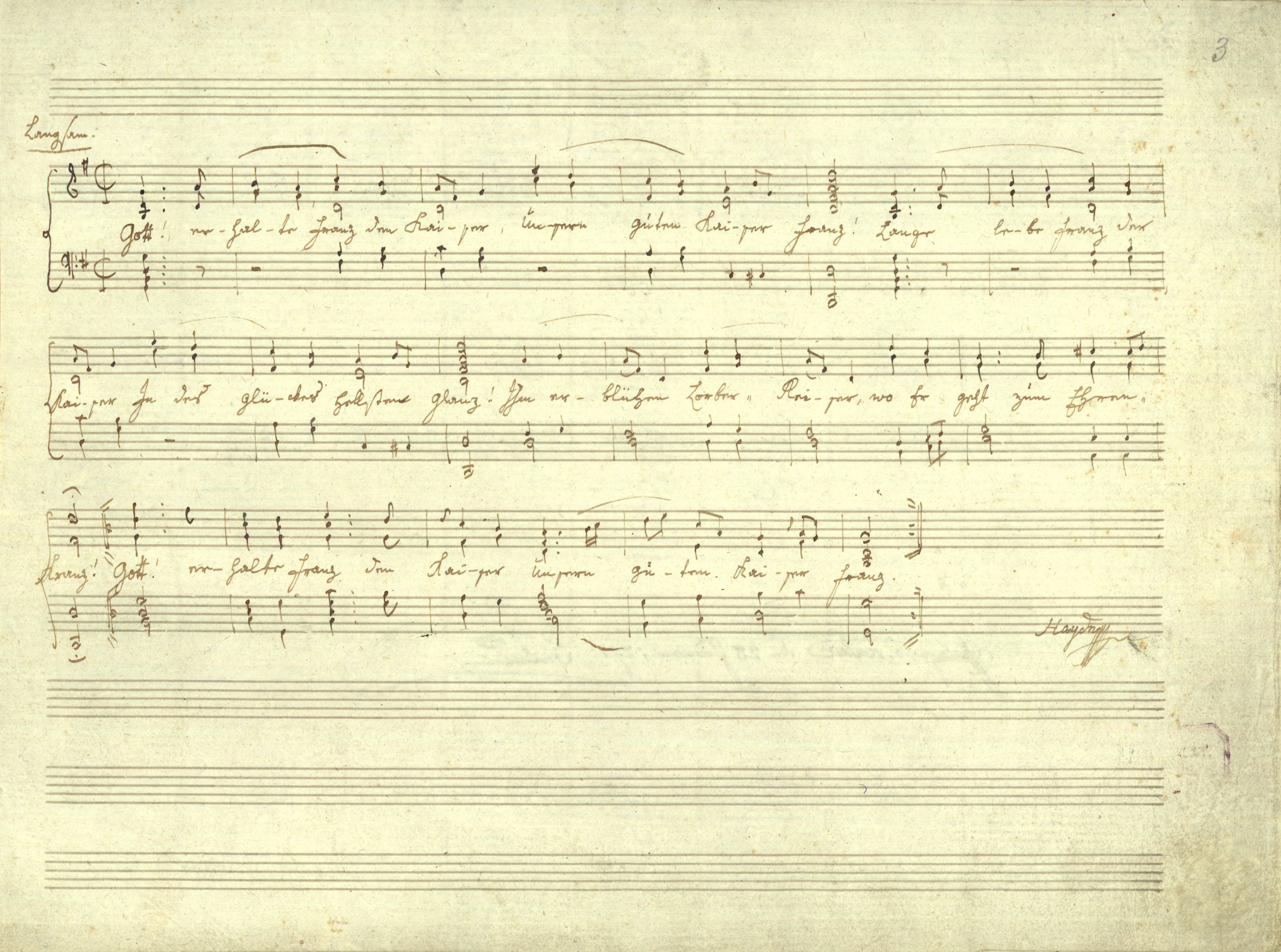
Joseph Haydn: Imperial hymn (Hob XXVIa:43). Fair copy of piano version with the first stanza (late 1796 or early 1797).

== Events ==
- February 12 – First performance of Gott erhalte Franz den Kaiser (God Save Emperor Francis), an anthem to Francis II, Emperor of the Holy Roman Empire and later of Austria, with lyrics by Lorenz Leopold Haschka and music by Joseph Haydn.

== Popular Music ==
- Charles Dibdin - Captain Wittle and Miss Roe (from 'The Sphinx')
- Charles Dibdin - The Country Club (from 'The Sphinx')
- Charles Dibdin - The Anchorsmiths (from 'The Tour to the Land's End')

== Classical music ==
- Jean-Jacques Beauvarlet-Charpentier – Victoire de l’armée d’Italie
- Ludwig van Beethoven
  - Piano Sonata, Op. 7, in E-flat
  - Kriegslied der Österreicher, WoO 122
- Jan Ladislav Dussek
  - Grand Duo, Op. 32
  - 2 Harp Sonatas, Op. 34
  - Piano Trio, Op. 37
  - Duet for Harp and Piano, Op. 38
  - La Consolation, Op. 62
- Anton Eberl – 2 Sonatas for Keyboard 4-Hands, Op. 7
- Joseph Haydn
  - String Quartets, Op. 76, "Erdödy Quartets"
  - Piano Trios, Op. 86
  - Das Kaiserlied, Hob.XXVIa:43
- Michael Haydn – 4 Sonatas for Violin and Viola
- James Hewitt – Piano Sonata in D major 'The Battle of Trenton'
- James Hook – 6 Trios, Op. 83
- Hyacinthe Jadin
  - Quartet for Strings, Op. 1
  - 3 String Trios, Op. 2
  - 3 Sonatas, Op. 3
- Ignaz Pleyel – Concerto in C major, B.106
- Carl Leopold Röllig – Kleine und leichte Tonstücke für die Orphica
- Giovanni Battista Viotti – Concerto for Violin No. 22 in A minor
- Paul Wranitzky – Symphony in C minor, Op. 31 "La paix"

== Opera ==
- Luigi Cherubini – Médée
- Domenico Cimarosa – Artemisia regina di Caria
- Józef Elsner – Amazonki
- Étienne Méhul – Le jeune Henri
- Luigi Mosca – L'impresario burlato
- Joseph Weigl – L’amor marinaro

== Methods and theory writings ==
- Johann Friedrich Daube – Anleitung zur Erfindung der Melodie und ihrer Fortsetzung
- Johann Peter Milchmeyer – Die wahre Art das Pianoforte zu spielen
- Ignaz Pleyel – Méthode pour le pianoforte
- Jean Marie Raoul – Méthode de violoncelle, Op. 4
- Othen-Joseph Vandenbroek – Méthode nouvelle et raisonnée pour apprendre à donner du Cor

== Births ==
- January 10 – Annette von Droste-Hülshoff, German composer (died 1848)
- January 31 – Franz Schubert, composer (d. 1828)
- February 22 – Heinrich Engelhard Steinweg, German-American piano manufacturer (d. 1871)
- March 6 – Dr. Gerrit Smith, dedicatee and abolitionist (died 1874)
- May 6 – Joseph Brackett, American songwriter (died 1882)
- May 22 – Eleonora Zrza, Danish opera soprano (d. 1862)
- May 30 – Johann Christian Lobe, German composer (died 1881)
- August 5 – Friedrich August Kummer, composer and musician (died 1879)
- August 10 – Guillaume Louis Cottrau, composer and publisher (died 1847)
- September 7 – Per Erik Wallqvist, Ballet master (d. 1855)
- October 26 – Giuditta Pasta, operatic soprano (d. 1865)
- November 29 – Gaetano Donizetti, composer (d. 1848)
- December 13 – Heinrich Heine, librettist and poet (died 1856)

== Deaths ==
- February 2 – Pasquale Anfossi, composer (born 1727)
- February 8 – Johann Friedrich Doles, composer (born 1715)
- February 11 – Antoine Dauvergne, violinist and composer (born 1713)
- March 19 – Philip Hayes, organist, singer, conductor and composer (born 1738)
- April 12 – Josef Antonín Štěpán, Bohemian composer (born 1726)
- May 17 – Michel-Jean Sedaine, librettist and writer (born 1719)
- May 28 – Anton Raaff, operatic tenor (born 1714)
- August 25 – Jean-Baptiste Louvet de Couvray, librettist and novelist (born 1760)
- September 3 – Josina van Aerssen, composer and painter (born 1733)
- September 11 – Pierre Jélyotte, operatic tenor (born 1713)
- November 21 – Pietro Pompeo Sales, Italian composer (born 1729)
