= Paolo Benedetto Bellinzani =

Italian composer

Paolo Benedetto Bellinzani (1682 – February 26, 1757) was an Italian composer of first half of the eighteenth century. Among his works are holy masses, offertories, duets, madrigals, litanies, motets and magnificat. His first known composition is a Requiem aeternam written in 1700 for two violins, Soprano, Alto, Tenor, Bass, Organ. He was active in the Italian regions of Friuli, Veneto, Emilia, Marche and Umbria.

Bellinzani died on February 26, 1757, in Recanati at the age of 74.
