= Giuseppe Demachi =

Italian composer and violinist

Giuseppe Demachi (9 June 1732 – 1791 or after) was a composer born in Alessandria, Kingdom of Sardinia. He served as a leading violinist in the city of his birth and later in the city of Geneva with the Concerto di Ginevra of the Societé de Musique. He also served in the employ of one Count Sannazzaro in the 1760s and 1770s at Casale Monferrato. Not much is known about his life or death.

Other than the records of his birth in 1732, his next known appearance in history was in 1763, when he was listed as playing in Alessandria's orchestra. After 1777, he again fell into obscurity until his last verifiable appearance during some concerts in London in 1791. The date of his death is not known, but is believed to have been shortly after his performances in London.

Demachi is listed as a composer of a significant number of works, including four symphonie concertante, eighteen duo sonatas, fifty-six trio sonatas, a pair of orchestral overtures and six string quartets listed as "for orchestra." One of his most famous works is the symphony Le campane di Roma (The Bells of Rome).

== Sources ==
- Giuseppe Demachi at AllMusic
- Free scores by Giuseppe Demachi at the International Music Score Library Project (IMSLP)
