= Giovanni Battista Sammartini =

Italian composer (1700-1775)

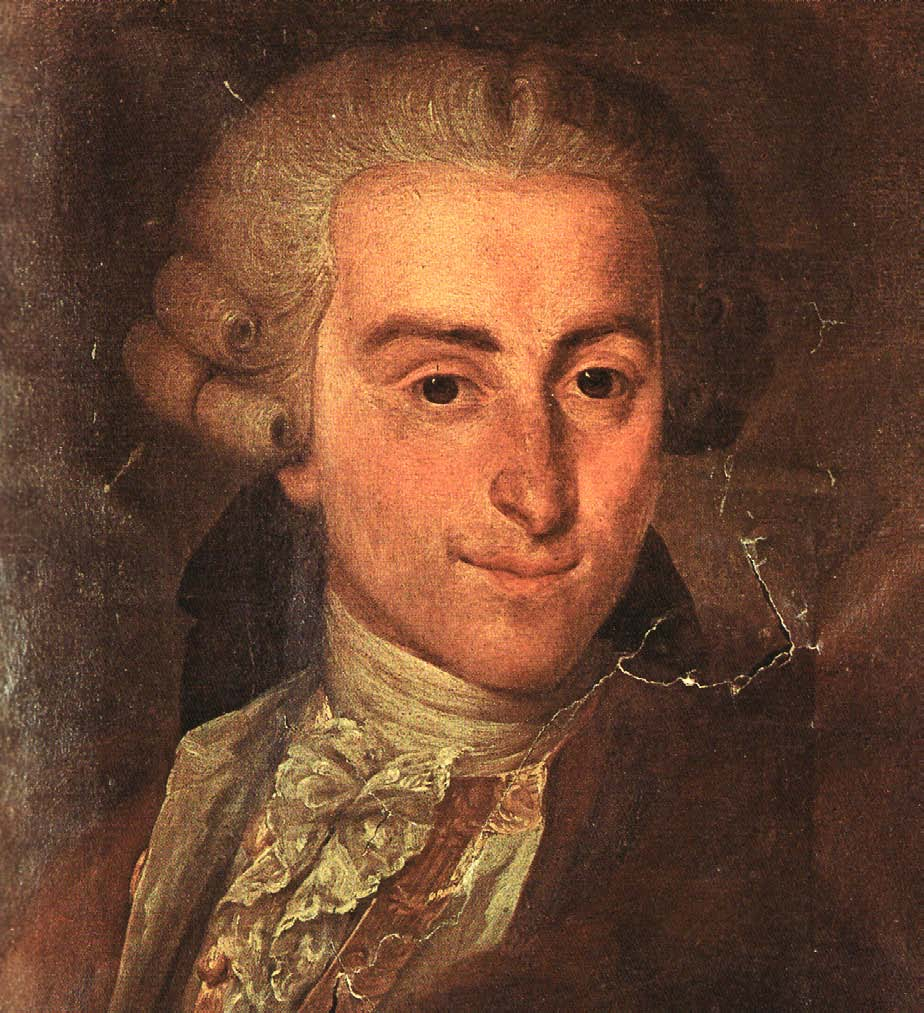
The only surviving portrait of Sammartini, painted by Domenico Riccardi.

Giovanni Battista Sammartini (c. 1700 – 15 January 1775) was an Italian composer, violinist, organist, choirmaster and teacher. He counted Gluck among his students, and was highly regarded by younger composers including Johann Christian Bach. It has also been noted that many stylizations in Joseph Haydn's compositions are similar to those of Sammartini, although Haydn denied any such influence. Sammartini is especially associated with the formation of the concert symphony through both the shift from a brief opera-overture style and the introduction of a new seriousness and use of thematic development that prefigure Haydn and Mozart. Some of his works are described as galant, a style associated with Enlightenment ideals, while "the prevailing impression left by Sammartini's work... [is that] he contributed greatly to the development of a Classical style that achieved its moment of greatest clarity precisely when his long, active life was approaching its end".

He is sometimes confused with his elder brother, Giuseppe, a composer with a similarly prolific output though not equal renown or influence who ended up in the service of Frederick, Prince of Wales.

== Life ==
Giovanni Battista Sammartini was born to French emigrant and oboist Alexis Saint-Martin and Girolama de Federici in Milan, in what was Habsburg-ruled Lombardy during most of his lifetime and is Italy today.

He was the seventh of eight children, receiving musical instruction from his father and writing his first music in 1725: a set of vocal works now lost. He acquired the prestigious positions of maestro di cappella at Sant'Ambrogio and to the Congregazione del Santissimo Entierro in 1728, and held the former until his death. Sammartini quickly became famous as a church composer and obtained fame abroad. Over the years he joined many churches for work (eight or more by his death) and wrote music to be performed at state occasions and in the houses of the nobility. Although he never strayed far from Milan, he came into contact with such notable composers as J.C. Bach, Mozart, Boccherini, and Gluck, the last of whom was his student from 1737 to 1741.

Sammartini's death in 1775 was unexpected. Although he was highly regarded in his time, his music was soon forgotten, and it was not rediscovered until 1913, by researchers Fausto Torrefranca, Georges de Saint-Foix and Gaetano Cesari. Curiously most of his surviving works have been recovered from editions published outside Milan.

== Innovations ==
Sammartini is mostly praised for his innovations in the development of the symphony, perhaps more so than the schools of thought in Mannheim and Vienna. His approach to symphonic composition was unique in that it drew influence from the trio sonata and concerto forms, in contrast to other composers during the time that modeled symphonies after the Italian overture. His symphonies were driven by rhythm and a clearer form, especially early sonata and rounded binary forms. His works never ceased to be inventive, and sometimes anticipated the direction of classical music such as the Sturm und Drang style. Czech composer Josef Mysliveček considered Sammartini to be "the father of Haydn's style," a popular sentiment that considerably enhanced Sammartini's reputation after his death.

== Compositions ==
Sammartini was a prolific composer, and his compositions include 4 operas, about 70 symphonies, ten concertos, and a substantial body of chamber music. As of 2004, approximately 450 known works by Sammartini have been recovered, although a fair amount of his music has been lost, especially sacred and dramatic works. Some of it may have also been lost due to publication under other names, especially that of his brother, Giuseppe. His earliest music was for liturgical use.

Sammartini's works are referred to, in publications or recordings, either by the opus number they received in his lifetime, or by the J-C numbers they receive in the [Newell] Jenkins-[Bathia] Churgin catalog referred to below. Newell Jenkins edited some of Sammartini's works, including a Magnificat, for the first time (he was also an editor of works by Vivaldi, Paisiello and Boccherini, among others).

Sammartini's music is generally divided into three stylistic periods: the early period (1724–1739), which reflects a mixture of Baroque and Preclassical forms, the middle period (1740–1758), which suggests Preclassical form, and the late period (1759–1774), that displays Classical influences. Sammartini's middle period is regarded as his most significant and pioneering, during which his compositions in the galant style of music foreshadow the Classical era to come.

=== Known works ===
- Symphonies (78)
- Concertos (10 or 11):
  - For flute
  - For violin
  - For cello
  - For oboe
- Concertinos (7)
- Marches (4)
- Minuets (4)
- String quintets (6)
- Flute and string quartets (27)
- String trios (~177)
- Sonatas (over 50):
  - For flute
  - For violin
  - For cello
  - For keyboard (harpsichord and organ)
  - For mandolin ("armandolino") (1)
- Operas (3)
  - Memet (1732, Lodi, Lombardy), 'tragedia' in three acts, the first movements of two of Sammartini's earliest known symphonies appear as overtures
  - L'ambizione superata dalla virtù (26 December 1734, Teatro Regio Ducale, Milan), 'drama' in three acts
  - L'Agrippina, moglie di Tiberio (January 1743, Teatro Regio Ducale, Milan), dramma per musica in three acts,
- Arias and vocal ensemble pieces (11)
- Cantatas (8)
- Oratorio (1)
  - La gara dei geni (28 May 1747, Teatro Regio Ducale, Milan), 'componimento drammatico' (of which only one aria survives)
- Sacred works (16)
  - Mass settings
  - Psalm settings
  - Litanies
  - Magnificat
  - Te Deum
