= John Baston =

English Baroque composer and recorder player

John Baston, (fl. 1708–1739) was an English Baroque composer, recorder player and cellist. He performed in his own ‘interval music’ concertos in London; several of these lively pieces were published as Six Concertos in Six Parts for Violins and Flutes (1729).
