= Ferdinand Beyer =

German composer and pianist

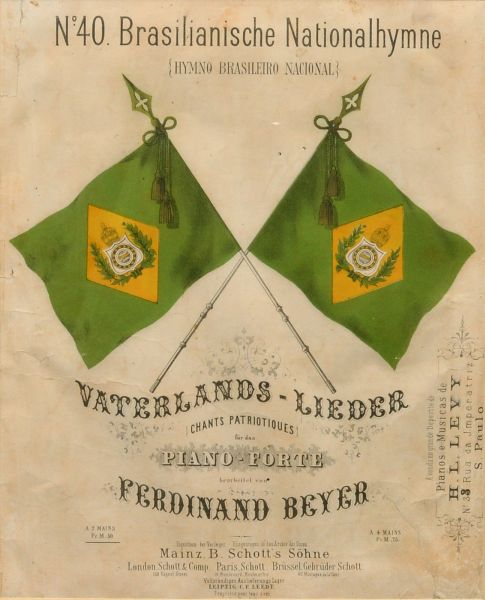
Partiture by Ferdinand Beyer

Ferdinand Beyer (Querfurt, 25 July 1806 – Mainz, 14 May 1863) was a German composer and pianist. Well known in his day for his light music and piano arrangements of popular orchestral works, he is now mainly known for his book Vorschule im Klavierspiel ("Beginning Piano School or Elementary Instruction Book for the Piano") Op. 101 (1851).

The Vorschule im Klavierspiel has been a major influence in piano pedagogy since its publication, being the foundation of elementary piano education in many countries, as is attested by the many anthologies containing parts of the Vorschule as well as the curriculum followed in many countries.
