= Johann Becker (organist) =

German composer and organist (1726–1803)

- Born: 1 September 1726; Helsa
- Died: 1803 (aged 76–77)
- Occupation: Organist Teacher Composer

Johann Becker (1 September 1726 – 1803) was a German organist, teacher, and composer, born in Helsa-Wickenrode near Kassel. He studied with Johann Sebastian Bach in Leipzig from about 1745 to 1748. He taught in Hartmuthsachsen, Bettenhausen, and Kassel, where in 1761 he was appointed municipal organist. In 1770 he was appointed court organist. He wrote mainly church music.
