= Johann Gottfried Eckard =

German pianist and composer

Johann Gottfried Eckard (Eckhardt) (21 January 1735 – 24 July 1809) was a German pianist and composer.

Eckard was born in Augsburg. In his youth he became a professional copper engraver and acquired his musical training in his leisure time, mainly from C.P.E. Bach's Versuch über die wahre Art das Clavier zu spielen and its six ‘Probesonaten’. In 1758 the piano and organ manufacturer Johann Andreas Stein took him to Paris, where he lived for the rest of his life. At first he supported himself by painting miniatures, a craft in which he apparently possessed considerable skill. He practised the piano in his free time and quickly developed a great facility. Many successful concerts soon gained him fame and numerous students.

Leopold Mozart became acquainted with Eckard during his visit to Paris in the winter of 1763–4, and expressed high regard for him. Grimm, in his Correspondence littéraire, called Eckard ‘the strongest’ of all Parisian composers, stating that ‘he has genius, the most beautiful ideas, with a manner of playing full of feeling and an extraordinary lightness’. That this was not merely a momentary captivation of the Parisian musical circles is attested by J.-B. de La Borde, who declared in 1780 that Eckard's execution at the keyboard was ‘the most brilliant and pleasing’ and that ‘he excels particularly at preluding for entire hours making the time pass as moments for those who listen to him’. Burney gave further testimony to the high regard felt for him by his contemporaries:

There are many great German musicians dispersed throughout Europe, whose merit is little known in England, or even in their native land; among these is Eckard, who has been fifty years at Paris. This musician has published but little; yet by what has appeared, it is manifest that he is a man of genius and a great master of his instrument.

Eckard died, aged 74, in Paris. On his death the Mercure de France remarked that he was ‘the most celebrated harpsichordist of Europe’.

Eckard has two claims to historical significance: he was the first composer in Paris to conceive keyboard sonatas for the piano, and he foresaw the great vogue the piano would enjoy several years before this instrument was accepted in the salons and concert halls of Paris. Unfortunately only three works by him were published: the six sonatas op.1 (1763), two sonatas op.2 (1764) and a set of variations (1764) on the ‘Menuet d'Exaudet’. (All these works are edited by E. Reeser in J.G. Eckard: Oeuvres complètes, Amsterdam and Kassel, 1956; the fugues and concertos referred to by Schubart are not extant.) Although the title-page of op.1 specifies only the harpsichord, Eckard's preface extends the performance of the work to the piano; and his meticulous indication of dynamic shadings (e.g. no.6, second movement), a practice previously unknown in this period, clearly shows his preference for the latter instrument. Both the piano and harpsichord are specified on the title-page of his op.2, and the music reveals an even greater consideration for the idiomatic characteristics of the new instrument.

Eckard's sonatas follow no set pattern with regard to formal organization: half are in three movements, two consist of only two movements, and two others are cast in a rather extended single movement (op.1 nos.4–5). Unlike the sonatas of Eckard's émigré compatriots in Paris, none calls for accompanying instruments to heighten expression. The texture is enlivened at times by the contrapuntal involvement of the left hand; and in an effort to make the accompaniment of greater musical significance, Eckard did not restrict himself to the Alberti bass pattern, but used it rather as one of several devices. Although his thematic material is not particularly distinguishable from that of his contemporaries, Eckard's ability to develop it anticipates the mature works of Joseph Haydn and Wolfgang Amadeus Mozart (e.g. op.1 no.2, first movement). His style shows the influence of C.P.E. Bach (op.1 no.3, first movement) and is similar to that of his fellow expatriate Johann Schobert (cf the first movements of Eckard's op.1 no.3 and Schobert's op.14 no.3). He also exerted a considerable influence on the young Mozart, who admired his works and adopted some of their traits in his keyboard music of 1762–4 (Mozart's accompanied sonata K6 is derivative of the first and third movements of Eckard's op.1 no.1). Furthermore, in 1767 Mozart transcribed one of Eckard's one-movement sonatas (op.1 no.4) as the slow movement of his Piano Concerto K40.

== Bibliography ==
- P. von Stetten: Kunst-, Gewerb- und Handwerks-Geschichte der Reichs-Stadt (Augsburg, 1779–88)
- C.F.D. Schubart: Ideen zu einer Ästhetik der Tonkunst (Vienna, 1806/R)
- F.M. Grimm: Correspondence littéraire, philosophique, et critique (Paris, 1812–14); complete version, ed. M. Tourneux (Paris, 1877–82/R)
- A. Méreaux: Les clavecinistes de 1637 à 1790 (Paris, 1864–7/R)
- T. de Wyzewa and G. de Saint-Foix: W.-A. Mozart: sa vie musicale et son oeuvre (Paris, 1912–46/R)
- H.T. David: Johann Schobert als Sonatenkomponist (Borna, 1928)
- E. Hertz: Johann Andreas Stein (Würzburg and Wolfenbüttel, 1937)
- E. Reeser: De klaviersonate met vioolbegeleiding in het Parijsche muziekleven ten tijde van Mozart (Rotterdam, 1939)
- E. Reeser: ‘Johann Gottfried Eckard, 1735–1809’, TVNM, xvii/2 (1949), 89–125
- W.A. Bauer, O.E. Deutsch and J. Eibl, eds.: Mozart: Briefe und Aufzeichnungen (Kassel, 1962–75)
- H.C. Turrentine: Johann Schobert and French Clavier Music from 1700 to the Revolution (diss., U. of Iowa, 1962)
- E. Reeser: Ein Augsburger Musiker in Paris: Johann Gottfried Eckard (1735–1809) (Augsburg, 1984)
- D.R. Fuller: ‘A New French Harpsichord Source of the Mid-18th Century with an Eckard Connection’, EMc, xxi (1993), 423–7
