= John Abell =

Scottish countertenor, composer and lutenist

John Abell (1653 – after 1724) was a Scottish countertenor, composer and lutenist.

== Life and career ==
John Abell was born in 1653 in Aberdeenshire and by 1 May 1679 he had become a member of the Chapel Royal. He was listed as a singer, lutenist and violinist for King Charles II. He was sent to Venice by the king as an example of a high quality English voice, returning by 1682. Between 1679 and 1688, he received large amounts of money from the king to study. During this time he graduated from Cambridge with a MusB and married Lady Frances Knollys on 29 December 1685.

During the Glorious Revolution of 1688 he fled to continental Europe, where he won fame and wealth by his singing. There are several anecdotes relating to his travels from this time, several from the writings of Hawkins.

Upon his arrival at Warsaw, the king having notice of it, sent for him to his court. Abell made some slight excuse to evade going, but upon being told that he had everything to fear from the king’s resentment, he made an apology, and received a command to attend the king next day. Upon his arrival at the palace, he was seated in a chair in the middle of a spacious hall, and immediately drawn up to a great height; presently the king with his attendants appeared in a gallery opposite to him, and at the same instant a number of wild bears were turned in; the king bade him then choose whether he would sing or be let down among the bears: Abell chose the former, and declared afterwards that he never sang so well in his life.

— J. Hawkins

Daniel Purcell attempted to coax Abell back to England in 1696 for a salary of £500 per year (worth over £1 million in 2019) (Note: Comparing average earnings between 1696 and 2019, £500 is valued at approximately £1.098 million by MeasuringWorth.com) however, he declined. In Kassel he was made Intendant of Music (1698–1699), before returning to England around 1700, where in 1701 he performed the title role in Daniel Purcell's The Judgment of Paris: in the following year his coronation song for Queen Anne, Aloud proclaim the cheerful sound, was performed.

He also gave public and private concerts, and taught music. Furthermore, he wrote and compiled songs in the Italian style of the time, with a collection of his being published in 1701 and another posthumously in 1740. He lived his later years in Cambridge, where he is thought to have died, some time after 1716.
