= François Chauvon =

François Chauvon was a Baroque composer and oboist. He was a pupil of François Couperin. In 1717 he compiled a collection of solos for the oboe entitled Tibiades. His other published works are dated between the years of 1712 and 1736.
