= Johann Christian Lobe =

German composer and music theorist

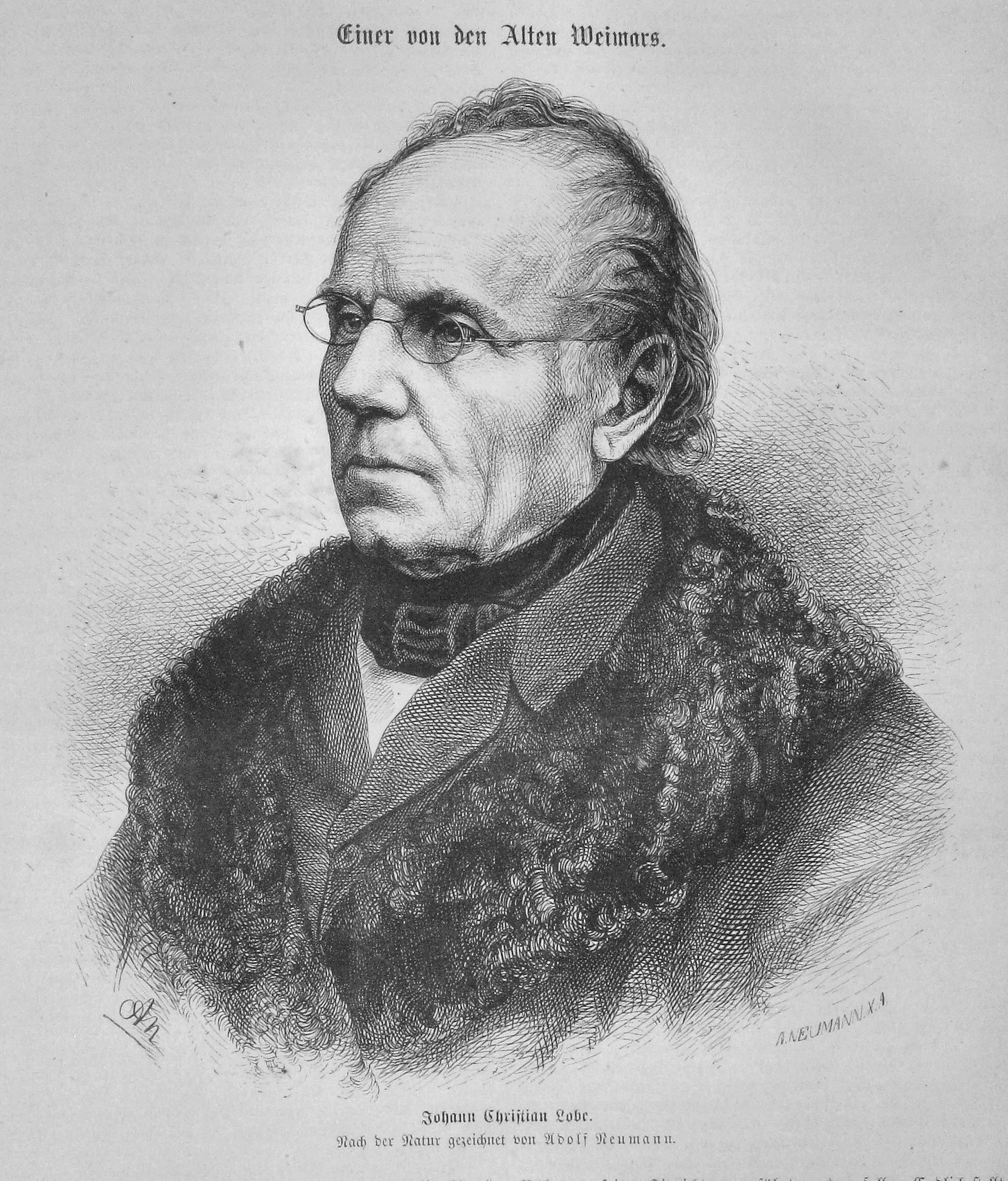
Johann Christian Lobe.

Johann Christian Lobe (May 30, 1797 – July 27, 1881) was a German composer and music theorist.

Born in Weimar, Lobe was either self-taught as a musician (Anon. 1885–92) or had music lessons from the age of seven (Brandt 2001). In 1810, he became violinist in the Weimar Court Orchestra (Anon. 1885–92), or else was a flautist and joined the Weimar orchestra in 1811 (Brandt 2001). He composed many musical works before 1819 (Brandt 2001), and debuted as a composer in 1821, with the opera Wittekind, which was followed by a number of others, including Die Flibustier (1830) and Die Fürstin von Granada (1833), as well as some orchestral works (Anon. 1885–92). Die Fürstin von Grenada was especially successful (Brandt 2001). Either in 1842 (Anon. 1885–92) or 1845 (Brandt 2001) he retired from his position in the Weimar orchestra, was appointed a professor and in 1846 moved to Leipzig, where he worked as a music-composition teacher and music critic (Anon. 1885–92; Brandt 2001). He is today best remembered for his writings on music, of which his most important work is Lehrbuch der musikalischen Komposition (Textbook on Music Composition, 4 vols., 1850–67). He died in Leipzig in 1881.

== Selected writings ==
- Lehrbuch der musikalischen Komposition (1850–67)
- Katechismus der Musik (1851)
- Fliegende Blätter für Musik (editor, 1853–57)
- Aus dem Leben eines Musikers (1859)
- Musikalische Briefe eines Wohlbekannten (1860)
- Vereinfachte Harmonielehre (1861)
- Konsonanzen und Dissonanzen (1869)
- Katechismus der Kompositionslehre (1882)
