= Agostino Accorimboni =

Italian composer (1739–1818)

Agostino Accorimboni (28 August 1739 – 13 August 1818), last name also given as Accoramboni, Accorimbeni or Accorrimboni, was an Italian composer known mostly for his operas. He composed thirteen operas of which ten premiered in Rome between 1770 and 1785.

== Operas ==
- a cara de a more 1765
- Le scalte contadine di Montegelato (1768)
- Le contadine astute (1770)
- L'amante nel sacco (1772)
- Le finte zingarelle (1774)
- Il finto cavaliere (1777)
- La Nitteti (1777)
- L'amore artigiano (1778)
- Le virtuose bizzarre (1778)
- Il marchese di Castelverde (1779)
- Il podestà di Tufo antico, o sia Il tutore burlato (1780)
- Lo schiavo fortunato, o sia La marchesina fedele (1783)
- Il regno delle Amazzoni (1783)
- Il governatore delle Isole Canarie (1785)
