= Joseph Anton Steffan =

Czech-Austrian classical era composer and harpsichordist

Joseph Anton Steffan (Czech: Josef Antonín Štěpán; c. March 1726 – c. April 1797) was a Czech-Austrian classical era composer and harpsichordist.

Steffan was born in Kopidlno, near Hradec Králové, Bohemia in March 1726, the son of a schoolmaster and church organist. He received his first musical lessons from his father. In 1741, he fled from the Prussian Army to Vienna. There, taken in the household of Count Schlick, he became a student of Georg Christoph Wagenseil. As one of the most respectable harpsichordist in Vienna he became the piano teacher of Maria Carolina and Marie Antoinette. In 1775, he contracted an eye disease which left him almost blind. He gave up his position at the court, but continued to compose. Almost forgotten he died in Vienna in April 1797.

== Works ==
Steffan's compositional output includes sacred works and chamber music (especially piano music). In particular he wrote caprices, harpsichord sonatas and concertos. Specific works include:

- 6 caprices for piano
- 6 concertos for harpsichord and harp with violin, cello, flutes and horns, Op. 3, No. 1-6
- 11 variations on an aria by Johann Christian Bach
- Collection of German songs for the piano
- Concerto for two alto recorders and basso continuo in F major
- Divertimenti, Op. 1, Nos. 1-6
- Divertimento for two pianos, two violins and bass in E♭ major (originally attributed to Haydn, Hob: XIV: Es1)
- Divertimento in B♭ major
- Minuets for piano
- Piano Concerto in B♭ major
- Piano Trio in C major
- Sonata in A major
- Sonata in B♭ major
- Sonata in D major
- Sonata in E major
- Sonata in G major
