= Josina van Aerssen =

Dutch composer

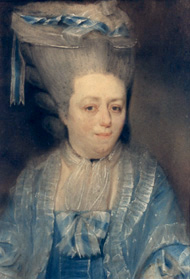
Portrait of Josina van Aerssen by Izaäk Schmidt

Josina Anna Petronella van Aerssen, married name Baroness Giustina Boetzelaer (3 January 1733 – 3 September 1797) was a Dutch composer, painter, lady in waiting and noble.

== Life ==
She was born in The Hague to Cornelis van Aerssen and Anna Albertina van Schagen Beijeren and in 1786 married Baron Carel van Boetzelaer.

Josina van Aerssen was the lady in waiting to Anne, Princess Royal and Princess of Orange, the spouse of prince William IV of Orange. She was a dilettante painter and made a portrait of princess Caroline. She was possibly active as a dilettante composer at court.

In 1780, she published several compositions. They were inspired by the Italian music and considered unique for the Netherlands. She died, aged 64, in IJsselstein.
