= Pietro Pompeo Sales =

Italian composer

Pietro Pompeo Sales (Brescia, 1729 – Hanau, 21 November 1797) was an Italian composer.

== Biography ==
Prematurely lost his parents during an earthquake, he was adopted by the Mondella family (a family from Brescia then part of the Republic of Venice). In 1750, he lived for six months in Storo and towards the end of that year, went to Innsbruck, where he entered the service of Baron Pircher and where he studied at the local university. In 1752, he composed a school drama for the Jesuit order. Two years later, he became director of an Italian opera company, with which he visited Cologne, Brussels, Lille and other central European cities.

== Compositions ==
=== Operas ===
- Massinissa, oder Die obsiegende Treu (dramma gesuita, 1752, Innsbruck)
- Le cinesi (componimento drammatico, libretto di Pietro Metastasio, 1757, Augsburg)
- L'isola disabitata (azione teatrale, libretto di Pietro Metastasio, 1758, Augusta)
- Le nozze di Amore e di Norizia (opera seria, libretto di Giunti, 1765, Teatro Cuvilliés di Munich)
- Antigona in Tebe (opera seria, 1767, Padova)
- L'Antigono (opera seria, libretto di Pietro Metastasio, 1769, Munich)
- Achille in Sciro (opera seria, libretto di Pietro Metastasio e A. Savioli, 1774, Munich)
- Il re pastore (opera seria, libretto di Pietro Metastasio)

=== Oratorios ===
- Oratorio per la festa del Santo Natale (libretto di Pietro Metastasio, 1756, Augsburg)
- Die Leiden unseres Herrn Jesu Christ (Augsburg)
- Giefte (libretto di Mattia Verazi, 1762, Mannheim)
- La Passione di Gesù Christo (libretto di Pietro Metastasio, 1772, Ehrenbreitstein)
- Heu quid egisti (1774, Munich)
- Isacco figura del redentore (libretto di Pietro Metastasio, 1778, Ehrenbreitstein)
- Giuseppe riconosciuto (libretto di Pietro Metastasio, 1780, Ehrenbreitstein)
- Gioàs, re di Giudia (libretto di Pietro Metastasio, 1781)
- La Betulia liberata (libretto di Pietro Metastasio, 1783, Ehrenbreitstein)
- Affectus amantis (1784, Ehrenbreitstein)
- Sant'Elena al Calvario (libretto di Pietro Metastasio, 1790, Ehrenbreitstein)

=== Sacred music ===
- Missa solemnis in do magg.
- Messa in do magg.
- Messa in fa-re magg. (Kyrie e Gloria)
- Missa solemnis in re magg.
- 2 Litaniae lauretanae
- Currite accedite (offertorio)
- Ecce panis angelorum (offertorio)
- Ave maris stella
- Mi deus ego amo te
- Salutis humani
- Tantum ergo
- Salve regina

=== Instrumental music ===
- 5 symphonies (re magg., re magg., fa magg., sol magg. sol magg.)
- Serenata
- Concerto per flauto in re magg.
- 3 concerti per clavicembalo (do magg., fa magg., sol magg.)
- Concerto per 2 clavicembali in sol magg.
- Partita (dubbia, attribuita anche a Christian Cannabich)
- Sonata per clavicembalo
- Trio in sol magg. per clavicembalo, violino e violoncello
- Notturno per 2 violini e violoncello
