= 1739 in music =

== Events ==
- March 27 Johann Sebastian Bach performs the Brockes-Passion TWV 5: 1 at St. Nicholas Church, Leipzig.
- September – Leopold Mozart is expelled from the Benedictine University of Salzburg for poor attendance.
- 1739–1749 Bach revises his St John Passion BWV 245 (BC D 2e)--version never performed during his lifetime (version we know today).
- 1739–1742 Bach starts revising some of his Weimar period Chorale preludes in a new manuscript (the so-called Great Eighteen Chorale Preludes BWV 651–668). Included at this period are BWV 651–663. The manuscript would also contain his Sonatas BWV 525–530 (1727–1732) and also his Canonic Variations on "Vom Himmel hoch da komm' ich her" BWV 769 (1747).

== Classical music ==
- Carl Philipp Emanuel Bach
  - Keyboard Sonata in G minor, H.21
  - Harpsichord Concerto in C minor, H.407
- Henry Carey – "Flocks Are Sporting"
- George Frederic Handel
  - Israel in Egypt, an oratorio, premiered in London
  - Saul, an oratorio, premiered in London
  - Concerto Grosso in G major, HWV 319, published 1740 in 12 Concerti Grossi Op. 6
  - Concerto Grosso in C minor, HWV 326, published 1740.
  - Concerto Grosso in B minor, HWV 330, published 1740.
- Leonardo Leo – Miserere
- Giovanni Battista Pescetti – 10 Harpsichord Sonatas
- Georg Philipp Telemann – 6 Moralische Kantaten, TWV 20:29–34
- Johann Adolph Hasse - Quando Jesus est in corde

== Opera ==
- Domenico Alberti — Olimpiade
- Johann Adolph Hasse – Viriate
- Gaetano Latilla – Romolo
- Leonardo Leo — Amor vuol sofferenza (later revised as La Finta Frascatana 1744)
- Giovanni Battista Pescetti — Angelica e Medoro
- Pietro Pulli — Il carnevale e la pazzia
- Jean-Philippe Rameau
  - Dardanus
  - Les fêtes d'Hébé
- Joseph-Nicolas-Pancrace Royer — Zaïde, reine de Grenade

== Publications ==
- Johann Sebastian Bach – Clavier-Übung III, a collection of organ music
- René Drouard de Bousset – 2e recueil de cantates spirituelles tirées des histoires les plus intéressantes de l'Ancien Testament à voix seule, et à deux voix avec simphonie et sans simphonie
- Nicolas Chédeville
  - 6 Flute Sonatas, Op. 7
  - Le Printems ou Les Saisons amusantes, Op. 8 (adaptation of Vivaldi's Four Seasons)
- Francesco Geminiani – 12 Violin Sonatas, Op. 4
- Jean-François Dandrieu – Pièces d'orgue, Livre 1 (published posthumously, Dandrieu had plans for a second book)
- George Frideric Handel – Trio Sonatas, Op. 5 (London: John Walsh)
- Gottlieb Muffat – Componimenti musicali (Augsburg)
- Clair-Nicolas Roget – 6 Sonatas for 2 Flutes, Op. 1
- Georg Philipp Telemann – Essercizii musici (published in 1739–1740)

== Methods and theory writings ==
- John Arnold – The Compleat Psalmodist (Published 1741, preface is dated 1739)
- Louis-Joseph Marchand – Traité de contrepoint simple
- Johann Mattheson – Der vollkommene Capellmeister
- Johann Adolph Scheibe – Eine Abhandlung von den Musicalischen Intervallen und Geschlechten

== Births ==
- May 12 – Johann Baptist Wanhal, composer (died 1813)
- July 6 – Friedrich Wilhelm Rust (died 1796)
- August 28 – Agostino Accorimboni, opera composer (died 1818)
- September 7 or 8 – Joseph Legros, singer and composer (died 1793)
- October 24 – Duchess Anna Amalia of Brunswick-Wolfenbüttel, composer (died 1807)
- November 2 – Carl Ditters von Dittersdorf, composer (died 1799)
- November 5 – Hugh Montgomerie, 12th Earl of Eglinton, politician and composer (died 1819)
- November 20 – Jean-François de La Harpe
- date unknown – Yelizaveta Belogradskaya, Russian singer and musician (died 1764)

== Deaths ==
- April 25 – Santiago de Murcia, guitarist and composer (born 1673)
- May 9 – Carlo Ignazio Monza, composer (born c. 1680)
- May 27 – Johann Gottfried Bernhard Bach, organist, son of Johann Sebastian Bach (born 1715)
- July 24 – Benedetto Marcello, composer (born 1686)
- September 12
  - Reinhard Keiser, composer (born 1674)
  - Landgrave of Hesse-Darmstadt Ernest Louis (born 1667)
- date unknown – Antonio Bioni, opera composer (born 1698)
- probable – Jean-Adam Guilain, organist and harpsichordist (born c. 1680)
