= Pierre Vachon =

French composer (1738–1803)

Pierre Vachon (3 June 1738 – 7 October 1803) was a French composer.

Vachon was born in Avignon, Papal States. He wrote around thirty string quartets, various chamber works, operas, and orchestral pieces. He studied the violin with Carlo Chiabrano in Paris and first performed on 24 December 1756, at the Concert Spirituel, playing one of his own compositions. He also performed as first violinist in the orchestra of the Prince of Conti. He died in Berlin at the age of 65.

== Selected works ==
- Op. 1, 6 sonatas for violin and basso continuo
- Op. 4, 6 trios for two violins and basso continuo
- Op. 5 (c. 1775), 6 string quartets
1. In A major
2. In G minor
3. In F minor
4. In B♭ major
5. In A major
6. In E♭ major
- Op. 6 (1776?), 6 string quartets, published in London, different from the 1773 op. 6
1. -
2. -
3. -
4. -
5. -
6. In D major
- Op. 7 (1773), 6 string quartets
1. In F major
2. In D major
3. In E♭ major
4. In B♭ major
5. In D minor
6. In C minor
- Op. 9 (1774), 6 string quartets (lost)
- Op. 11 (1782), 6 string quartets
1. In A major
2. In E major
3. In G major
4. In B major
5. In F minor
6. In C minor
- Opera: Renaud D'Ast (Comedy in two acts mixed with ariettes. Premiered 12 October 1765)
- Opera: Les femmes et le secret (9 November 1767)
- Opera: Sara, La fermière écossaise (in two acts) (8 May 1773)
