= 1733 in music =

This is a list of notable events in music that took place in the year 1733.

== Events ==
- July 2 – Johann Sebastian Bach performs a revised version of his Magnificat in D major, BWV 243, ending the mourning period for Augustus II the Strong, Elector of Saxony and King of Poland.
- July 10 – George Frideric Handel premieres his English-language oratorio Athalia at the University of Oxford's Sheldonian Theatre.
- First opera staged at the Nobile Teatro di San Giacomo di Corfù, Aurelio Aureli’s (librettist) Gerone, tiranno di Siracusa, probably the version with music by Johann Adolph Hasse, premiered in Naples in 1727.
- Wilhelm Friedemann Bach is appointed organist of the Sophienkirche, Dresden.
- Beginning date of the William Dixon manuscript of music for the Border pipes, the oldest known surviving manuscript of pipe music from the British Isles.
- Jean-Marie Leclair becomes musical director to King Louis XV of France.
- Charles Theodore Pachelbel settles in Boston, Massachusetts.
- After 1733 – Johann Sebastian Bach makes the Leipzig premiere of the Passion cantata Ein Lämmlein geht und trägt die Schuld by Carl Heinrich Graun.

== Publications ==
- Paolo Benedetto Bellinzani – Madrigali a due, a tre, quattro, e cinque voci, Op. 6
- Joseph Bodin de Boismortier – 6 Flute Sonatas, Op. 44
- Michel Corrette – 6 Concertos Comiques, Op. 8
- Pierre Dandrieu – Noëls, O filii, chansons de Saint-Jacques, Stabat mater, et carillons
- Willem de Fesch
  - 10 Trio Sonatas, Op. 7
  - 6 Cello Sonatas, Op. 8b
- François Francœur – 12 Violin Sonatas
- Francesco Geminiani – Concerti grossi, Op. 3
- George Frideric Handel
  - Suites de Pièces, HWV 434–442
  - Trio Sonatas, Op. 2 HWV 386–394
  - Water Music, HWV 348–350 (composed c.1717)
- Georg Friedrich Kauffmann – Harmonische Seelenlust (first volumes, not completed until 1736)
- Pietro Locatelli – L'arte del violino: XII concerti, cioè violino solo, con XXIV capricci ad libitum, Op. 3 (Amsterdam: Le Cene)
- Georg Philipp Telemann
  - 12 fantaisies à traversière sans basse, TWV 40:2–13 (Hamburg: [Telemann])
  - 6 Quatuors ou Trios (Hamburg: [Telemann])
  - Musique de table (Hamburg: [Telemann])
  - Singe-, Spiel- und Generalbassübungen, TWV 25:39–85 (Hamburg: [Telemann])
- Alexandre de Villeneuve
  - Conversations en manière de sonates, solo sonatas, Op. 1 (Paris)
  - Conversations en manière de sonates, trio sonatas, Op. 2 (Paris)

== Published popular music ==
- Orpheus caledonius: or, A collection of Scots songs – William Thomson

== Classical music ==
- Carl Philipp Emanuel Bach – Harpsichord Concerto in A minor, H.403
- Johann Sebastian Bach
  - Mass for the Dresden court, BWV 232 I (early version)
  - Ouverture nach Französischer Art, BWV 831
- Jean-Baptiste Barrière – 6 Cello Sonatas, Book 1
- Joseph Bodin de Boismortier – Ixion (secular cantata)
- Johann Ernst Galliard – 6 Bassoon Sonatas
- Christoph Graupner – Lass dein Ohr auf Weisheit, GWV 1138/33
- Maurice Greene – Lesson in D major
- George Frideric Handel
  - Deborah, HWV 51 (oratorio)
  - Athalia, HWV 52 (oratorio)
- Benedetto Marcello – Il pianto e il riso delle quattro stagioni (oratorio)
- Georg Philipp Telemann
  - Ach wie nichtig ach wie flüchtig, TWV 4:6
- Jan Dismas Zelenka
  - Requiem, ZWV 46 (for Elector Friedrich August II)
  - Barbara dira effera, ZWV 164
  - 8 Italian Arias, ZWV 176

== Opera ==
- Francisco António de Almeida – La pazienza di Socrate
- Thomas Arne – Rosamund, with the composer's sister, Susannah Maria, performing.
- Giovanni Battista Bononcini – Griselda
- Antonio Caldara
  - Demofoonte
  - L'Olimpiade
  - Sancio Pansa, governatore dell'isola Barattaria
- Geminiano Giacomelli – Adriano in Siria
- George Frideric Handel – Orlando
- Johann Adolf Hasse – Siroe
- John Frederick Lampe – Dione
- Giovanni Battista Pergolesi
  - Il prigionier superbo
  - La serva padrona (intermezzo)
- Nicola Antonio Porpora – Arianna in Nasso
- Jean-Philippe Rameau – Hippolyte et Aricie
- Antonio Vivaldi – Montezuma

== Methods and Theory Writings ==
- Alexandre de Villeneuve – Nouvelle méthode pour apprendre la musique

== Births ==
- January 3 – Josina van Aerssen (died 1797)
- January 17 – Thomas Linley the elder (died 1795)
- September 5 – Christoph Martin Wieland, poet and librettist (died 1813)
- September 22 – Johann Anton Filtz (died 1760)
- October 28 – Franz Ignaz von Beecke (died 1803)
- October 29 – Gottfried van Swieten, collaborator of Haydn, Mozart and Beethoven
- Date Unknown
  - Pierre Nicolas Brunet, playwright and librettist (died 1771)
  - Johann Christian Fischer, composer (died 1800)

== Deaths ==
- February 26 – Johann Adam Birkenstock, violinist and composer (born 1687)
- May 18 – Georg Böhm, organist (born 1661)
- July 2 – Christian Petzold, organist and composer (born 1677)
- September 12 – François Couperin (born 1668)
- October 14 – Pietro Pariati, librettist (born 1665)
- October 26 – Antonio Veracini (born 1659)
