= 1734 in music =

This is a list of notable events in music that took place in the year 1734.

== Events ==
- March 29 – Louis-Gabriel Guillemain becomes first violinist at the Royal Academy in Dijon.
- April 23 – Johann Sebastian Bach gives the Leipzig première of Gottfried Heinrich Stölzel's Passion Oratorio Ein Lämmlein geht und trägt die Schuld at St. Thomas Church, Leipzig.
- The London subscription company called the Royal Academy of Music is wound up as a result of difficulties including arguments between Handel and his singers.
- Approximate date of the William Dixon manuscript of music for the Border pipes.

== Classical music ==
- Carl Philipp Emanuel Bach – Harpsichord Concerto in E-flat major, H.404
- Johann Michael Bach – Fürchtet euch nicht (earliest surviving manuscript dated 1734)
- Johann Sebastian Bach – 3 Choräle zu Trauungen, BWV 250–252
- Antonio Caldara – Il giuoco del quadriglio
- Christoph Graupner
  - Ouverture in G major, GWV 466
  - Tut Busse und lasse sich ein jeglicher, GWV 1104/34
  - Herr, die Wasserströme erheben sich, GWV 1115/34
- George Frideric Handel – Antiphons, HWV 269–274
- Johann Adolf Hasse – Il cantico de' tre fanciulli
- Giovanni Battista Martini – Litaniae atque antiphonae finales B. V. Mariae
- Johann Joachim Quantz – 6 Flute Sonatas, RISM Q.19
- Georg Reutter – La Betulia liberata
- Georg Philipp Telemann
  - 6 Concerts et 6 Suites
  - Pyrmonter Kurwoche
  - 12 Solos à violon ou traversiere avec la basse chiffrée
- Antonio Vivaldi
  - Violin Concerto in C major, RV 177
  - Vengo a voi, luci adorate, RV 682

== Opera ==
- Francesco Araia – La forza dell'amore e dell'odio
- Riccardo Broschi – Artaserse (collaboration with Hasse, Ariosti)
- Antonio Caldara
  - La Clemenza di Tito
  - Le Lodi d'Augusto
- Giovanni Battista Costanzi – La Flora
- Geminiano Giacomelli – Merope
- George Frideric Handel
  - Il pastor fido, HWV 8b/c (revised from the 1712 version)
  - Arianna in Creta, HWV 32 (premiered)
  - Ariodante, HWV 33
  - Parnasso in festa, HWV 73 (Serenade)
- Johann Adolf Hasse – Larinda e Vanesio (intermezzo)
- Giovanni Battista Pergolesi – Adriano in Siria
- Antonio Vivaldi – L'Olimpiade
- Various – Siface (inc. work from Giuseppe Sellitto, Nicola Antonio Porpora, Leonardo Vinci, Geminiano Giacomelli, Johann Adolph Hasse)

== Publications ==
- Johann Sebastian Bach – 149 Chorales, D-LEb Peters Ms. R 18
- Joseph Bodin de Boismortier
  - 6 Sonates dont la derniere est en trio, Op. 50
  - 6 Sonatas for Flute and Violin, Op. 51
  - 4 Balets de village en trio, Op. 52
- Michel Corrette – Premier Livre de Pièces pour le Clavecin, Op. 12
- Jean-François Dandrieu – Pieces de clavecin, Book 3
- Pierre Février – Pièces de clavecin, Livre 1
- George Frideric Handel – Op. 3, 6 concerti grossi (London: John Walsh)
- Jean-Marie Leclair – 12 Violin Sonatas, Op. 5
- Johann Melchior Molter – Sonata grossa in D major, MWV 4.5
- Jean-Joseph Cassanéa de Mondonville – 6 Trio Sonatas, Op. 2
- Jean-Baptiste Morin – La chasse du cerf
- Giovanni Battista Somis – 12 Violin Sonatas, Op. 6
- Giuseppe Tartini – Violin Sonatas, Op. 1
- Georg Philipp Telemann – Verzeichniß der Telemannischen Musikalischen Werke
- Carlo Tessarini – Il maestro e discepolo, Op. 2

== Births ==
- January 17 – François-Joseph Gossec (died 1829)
- February 20 – Franz Ignaz Beck (died 1809)
- March 18 – Joseph Schmitt (died 1791)
- April 19 – Karl von Ordoñez, composer (died 1786)
- May 28 – Christoph Sonnleithner (died 1786)
- June 19 – Alphonse du Congé Dubreuil (died 1801)
- June 28 – Jean-Jacques Beauvarlet-Charpentier, organist and composer (died 1794)
- July 15 – Johann Ernst Altenburg (died 1801)
- July 20 – Jean-Henri Naderman (died 1799)
- July 23 – Antonio Maria Gaspare Sacchini, composer (died 1786)
- August 16 – Jean-Baptiste-Louis-Théodore de Tschudi (died 1784)
- September 5 – Jean-Benjamin de Laborde (died 1794)
- September 25 – Louis-René-Édouard de Rohan (died 1803)
- December 18 – Jean-Baptiste Rey, conductor and composer (died 1810)
- December 27 – Stephen Paxton (died 1787)
- December 31 – Claude Joseph Dorat (died 1780)
- date unknown – Benjamin Cooke, organist, composer and teacher (died 1793)

== Deaths ==
- February 25 – Marianna Bulgarelli, operatic soprano (born c. 1684)
- April 1 – Louis Lully, composer (born 1664)
- April 30 – Grzegorz Gerwazy Gorczycki, Baroque composer (born c. 1665)
- June 13 – Nicolaus Vetter, organist and composer (born 1666)
- October 6 – Gottfried Reiche, trumpet player and composer (born 1667)
- December 17 – Charlotte Brent, operatic soprano (died 1802)
- date unknown – Obadiah Shuttleworth, violinist, organist and composer
