= 1732 in music =

This is a list of notable events in music that took place in the year 1732.

== Events ==
- January 6 – The Teatro Filarmonico opens in Verona with a performance of Vivaldi's La Fida Ninfa
- February 3 – The Opéra-Comique opens in Paris
- April 11 – Johann Sebastian Bach revives his St John Passion BWV 245 (BC D 2c) with some textual and instrumentational changes at St. Nicholas Church, Leipzig
- April–May – First performances, in London, of George Frideric Handel's Esther as an oratorio
- December 7 – The first theatre is built on the site of the Royal Opera House, Covent Garden, London
- Between 1732 and 1735 – Bach gives the Leipzig première of Georg Philipp Telemann's Passion oratorio Seliges Erwägen des Leidens und Sterbens Jesu Christi (TWV 5:2)
- Michel Corrette begins producing his 25 Concertos Comiques, released until 1773.

== Published music ==
- Michel Blavet – 6 Flute Sonatas, Op. 2
- Joseph Bodin de Boismortier
  - 5 Sonates en trio suivies d'un concerto, Op. 37
  - 2 Sérénades en trois parties, Op. 39
  - 6 Sonates suivies d'un nombre de pièces, Op. 40
- Esprit Philippe Chédeville – Recueils de vaudevilles, menuets, contredanses et autres airs choisis pour la musette (Paris)
- Philibert Delavigne – Sonates pour la Musette, Vielle, Flute-a-bec, Traversiere, Hautbois etc. avec la Basse (6 Sonatas), Op. 2 (Paris)
- Francesco Geminiani – 6 Concertos, Opp. 3 and 4
- George Frideric Handel – Solos for a German Flute a Hoboy or Violin with a Thorough Bass for the Harpsichord or Bass Violin Compos'd by Mr. Handel (London: John Walsh) (second edition: "Note: This is more Corect [sic] than the former Edition")
- Pietro Locatelli – 12 Flute Sonatas, Op. 2
- Johann Joachim Quantz – 6 Sonatas for two flutes, Op. 2
- Georg Philipp Telemann
  - 36 Fantaisies pour le clavessin, TWV 33:1-36
  - Continuation des Sonates Méthodiques, TWV 41

== Classical music ==
- Giovanni Bononcini – 12 Trio Sonatas
- Antonio Caldara
  - La morte d'Abel
  - Sedecia
- Giovanni Battista Ferrandini – 18 Cantatas, D-Dl Mus.3037-K-1
- Lodovico Giustini – 12 Sonate da cimbalo di piano e forte, Op .1
- Christoph Graupner
  - Trio Sonata in D minor, GWV 207
  - Flute Concerto in D major, GWV 311
- Maurice Greene – The Song of Deborah and Baruk (oratorio)
- George Frederic Handel
  - Acis and Galatea (revised)
  - Esther, HWV 50b
  - Keyboard Sonata in G major, HWV 579
- Benedetto Marcello – Six Sonatas for Cello
- Giovanni Batisti Pergolesi – Stabat Mater, P. 77
- Nicola Antonio Porpora – Il martirio di S. Giovanni Nepomuceno

== Opera ==
- Tomaso Albinoni – Ardelinda
- Giuseppe Bonno – Nigella e Nise
- Antonio Caldara – Adriano in Siria
- Geminiano Giacomelli – Alessandro Severo
- George Frideric Handel
  - Ezio
  - Sosarme
- Johann Adolf Hasse
  - Il Demetrio
  - Euristero
  - Issipile
- John Frederick Lampe – Britannia
- Leo Leonardo – Demetrio
- Michel Montéclair – Jephté
- Giovanni Battista Pergolesi
  - Lo frate 'nnamorato
  - La Salustia
- Nicola Antonio Porpora – Germanico in Germania
- Georg Reutter – Alessandro il Grande
- Giovanni Battista Sammartini – Memet
- Giuseppe Sellitto – Nitocri
- Antonio Vivaldi – La fida ninfa

== Publications ==
- Musicalisches Lexicon, compiled by Johann Gottfried Walther
- Dissertation sur les différentes méthodes d'accompagnement by Jean-Phillipe Rameau
- Essai sur le bon goût en musique – Nicolas Racot de Grandval

== Births ==
- January 2 – František Brixi, composer (died 1771)
- January 24 – Pierre Augustin Caron de Beaumarchais
- February 18 – Johann Christian Kittel, composer (died 1809)
- February 19 – Richard Cumberland, librettist (died 1811)
- February 21 – William Falconer, poet (died 1769)
- March 31 – Joseph Haydn, composer (died 1809)
- May 17 – Francesco Pasquale Ricci, composer (died 1817)
- June 7
  - Nicolas-Médard Audinot, librettist and actor (died 1801)
  - Giuseppe Demachi, composer (died 1791)
- June 21 – Johann Christoph Friedrich Bach, composer, son of Johann Sebastian Bach (died 1795)
- September 1 – Thomas Erskine, 6th Earl of Kellie, composer (died 1781)
- October 6 – John Broadwood, founder of firm of piano makers (died 1812)
- Date unknown – Heinrich Ernst Grosmann, composer (died 1811)

== Deaths ==
- January 1 – Nicolo Grimaldi, castrato singer (born 1673)
- February 17 – Louis Marchand, composer (born 1669)
- March – Joseph François Salomon, composer (born 1649)
- July 20 – Francesco Bartolomeo Conti, composer
- November 15 – Girolamo Frigimelica Roberti, librettist (born 1653)
- December 4 – John Gay, writer of musical theatre (born 1685)
- December 14 – Johann Philipp Förtsch, composer (born 1652)
- date unknown – Pier Francesco Tosi, castrato singer (born c.1653)
