= 1727 in music =

The year 1727 in music involved some significant events.

== Events ==
- April 11 – Johann Sebastian Bach gives the première of his St Matthew Passion BWV 244b (BC D 3a) at St. Thomas Church, Leipzig
- Farinelli performs at Bologna, where he meets his mentor, Antonio Bernacchi.
- The Davidov-Morrini, ex General Dupont and Holroyd violins are made by Antonio Stradivari.
- Johann Adolph Hasse arrives in Venice.
- Louis-Claude Daquin is appointed organist at St Paul's in Paris.
- Agostino Steffani visits Italy for the last time, and meets Handel at the palace of Cardinal Ottoboni in Rome.
- George Frideric Handel is commissioned to write four anthems for the coronation ceremony of King George II of Great Britain. He becomes a British subject this year.

== Published music ==
- Joseph Bodin de Boismortier
  - 6 Suites à 2 Muzettes, Op. 11
  - 6 Concertos for 5 Flutes, Op. 15
  - 6 Suites à 2 Muzettes, Op. 17
- André Chéron – Sonates en trio, Op. 1
- Azzolino Bernardino Della Ciaia – Harpsichord Sonata in G major, Op. 4
- Girolamo Nicola Laurenti – 6 Concerti, Op. 1
- Michelle Mascitti – 8 Violin Sonatas and 4 Concertos à 6, Op. 7 (Paris)
- Antonio Vivaldi – La Cetra (The lyre) (Op. 9), 2 violin concertos and 1 for 2 violins (Amsterdam)
- Robert Woodcock – 12 Concertos in 8 parts

== Classical music ==
- Johann Sebastian Bach
  - Ach Gott, wie manches Herzeleid, BWV 58
  - Ein feste Burg ist unser Gott, BWV 80
  - Ich habe genug, BWV 82, premiered Feb. 2 in Leipzig
  - Ich bin vergnügt mit meinem Glücke, BWV 84
  - Ich lasse dich nicht, du segnest mich denn!, BWV 157
  - Dem Gerechten muss das Licht, BWV 195
  - Lass, Fürstin, lass noch einen Strahl, BWV 198
  - Matthäuspassion, BWV 244b
  - Partita in A minor, BWV 827
- Antonio Caldara – Il Batista
- Johann Joseph Fux – Laetare turba
- Christoph Graupner – Machet die Tore weit, GWV 1101/27
- George Frideric Handel
  - Coronation Anthems
  - Sonatas for an accompanied solo instrument, Op. 1 (published)
- Jean-Philippe Rameau – Nouvelles suites de pièces de clavecin
- Johan Helmich Roman – 12 Flute Sonatas, BeRI 201–212
- Giuseppe Sammartini – 12 Trio Sonatas
- Georg Philipp Telemann
  - 6 Sonatas, TWV 40:101–106
  - Trio Sonata, TWV 42:e7 (likely)
- Jan Dismas Zelenka
  - Credidi, ZWV 85
  - De profundis, ZWV 96
  - Lauda Jerusalem, ZWV 104
  - Magnificat, ZWV 107

== Opera ==
- Antonio Bioni – Attalo ed Arsinoe
- Giovanni Bononcini – Astianatte
- George Frideric Handel
  - Admeto, Premiered Jan. 31 in London
  - Riccardo Primo
- Leonardo Leo – Il Cid
- Benedetto Marcello – Arianna
- Georg Reutter – Archidamia
- Leonardo Vinci – La caduta de' decemviri
- Antonio Vivaldi
  - Farnace (first premiered; this version was lost and the 1731 Pavia version is the only one extant today)
  - Ipermestra, RV 722
  - Orlando
  - Siroe re di Persia, RV 735

== Published Theoretical Writings ==
- Ernst Gottlieb Baron – Historisch-theoretische und practische Untersuchung des Instruments der Lauten
- Giuseppe Graziani – Continuazione, e supplemento alla drammaturgia di M. L. Allacci

== Births ==
- February 25 – Armand-Louis Couperin, organist, harpsichordist and composer (died 1789)
- March 9 – Johann Gottlieb Preller, cantor and composer (died 1786)
- March 14 – Johann Gottlieb Goldberg, harpsichordist, organist and composer (died 1756)
- March 22 – Niel Gow, fiddler and composer (died 1807)
- March 30 – Tommaso Traetta, composer (died 1779)
- April 5 – Pasquale Anfossi, opera composer (died 1797)
- April 29 – Jean-Georges Noverre, a founder of modern ballet (died 1810)
- October 9 – Johann Wilhelm Hertel
- date unknown
  - Marie Favart, singer, dancer and actress (died 1772)
  - Rosa Scarlatti, opera singer (died 1775)

== Deaths ==
- February 1 – Giuseppe Sala, music publisher (born c. 1643)
- February 22 – Francesco Gasparini, composer (born 1661)
- May – Daniel Roseingrave, organist and composer (born c. 1655)
- August 14 – William Croft, organist and composer (born 1678)
- December 1 – Johann Heinrich Buttstett, organist and composer (born 1666)
