= Giuseppe Sammartini =

Italian composer and oboist (1695–1750)

Giuseppe Francesco Gaspare Melchiorre Baldassare Sammartini (also Gioseffo, S Martini, St Martini, San Martini, San Martino, Martini, Martino; 6 January 1695 – between 17 and 23 November 1750) was an Italian composer and oboist during the late Baroque and early Classical era. Although he was from Milan, most of his professional life was spent in London and with Frederick, the Prince of Wales. He also had a younger brother, Giovanni Battista Sammartini, who likewise became a renowned composer.

== Personal life ==
Giuseppe Sammartini was born in Milan, Italy. Giuseppe took oboe lessons from his French father Alexis Saint-Martin. Although born in Milan, Giuseppe found his success in other parts of Europe. His first trip was to Brussels, and from there he made his way to London where he would go on to spend the rest of his life. Giuseppe did return to Milan for his sister Madalena's marriage on 13 February 1728. In July 1728 Giuseppe also travelled to Brussels with his pupil Gaetano Parenti.

== Performer ==
Sammartini was an exceptionally skilled oboist. He could play the flute and recorder, as was customary at the time. Before moving to London, he was the oboist at San Celso in Milan around 1717. He then became the oboist at the Teatro Regio Ducale in 1720. He even gained fame in London as "the greatest [oboist] the world had ever known". He performed in places such as Lincoln's Inn Fields, Hickford's Room, Castle concerts, and in the opera orchestra at The King's Theatre. As an oboist, Giuseppe was unbelievably successful, and significantly advanced the level of oboe playing. Giuseppe was even able to make the oboe sound voice-like at times. One of his most notable students was the Englishman Thomas Vincent.

== Composer ==
He was well versed in the ways of counterpoint and proper harmony. This made him a very skilled composer of his time. One of Giuseppe's first published collections was a set of 12 trio sonatas. It was published in London by Walsh & Hare. Sammartini's career as a composer advanced when he was hired as the music master for the Prince of Wales, Frederick, and his wife Augusta. He worked for them and their children from 1736 until his death in 1750. While working for the family, Sammartini dedicated many works to the different members of the family. His 12 sonatas op. 1 were dedicated to Frederick, and his 12 trios op. 3 to Augusta. Sammartini was clearly very attached to this family, writing everything from these wonderful collections to simple birthday tunes for the children.

Most of Sammartini's chamber music was played and re-published regularly during his life. However, many of the concertos and overtures that Sammartini wrote were not published until after his death, but then gained wide acceptance, even more than other Italian composers such as Corelli.

== Musical style ==
Although Sammartini wrote in a later Baroque style, he also incorporated many Classical elements. Sammartini was forward thinking as a composer, and even used ideas such as a galant style and Sturm und Drang, (the idea of extreme and stormy emotions). Sammartini had other clearly forward thinking musical trends. An example of this would be the number of movements in some of his concertos and symphonies.

Being primarily an instrumental composer, Sammartini wrote a significant amount of solo sonatas. Due to his professional instrument, many of these sonatas were written for the flute, recorder, and oboe. One of his unique idioms was starting a sonata with a slow movement. His larger orchestral works often featured four to five movements with slow transitional movements. Giuseppe Sammartini was one of the first composers to write keyboard concertos in England, causing him to be an exceptionally influential composer for his time.

== Works ==
24 sonatas for recorder and bass, 30 trios for flutes or violins, 24 concerti grossi, 4 keyboard concertos, oboe concertos, 16 overtures, some cello sonatas, some flute duets.

One of Sammartini's most famous pieces is his Concerto in F major for recorder, strings and continuo.

== Notes ==
Sources

- Churgin, Bathia (1975). "G. B. Sammartini and the Symphony". The Musical Times. 116 (1583): 26–29. doi:10.2307/958863. JSTOR 958863.
- Churgin, Bathia (2001). "Giuseppe Sammartini". Dictionary of Music and Musicians. New York: Grove's Dictionaries.
- Churgin, Bathia (n.d.). "Giuseppe Sammartini". Grove Music Online (8th ed.). Oxford University Press. ISBN 978-1-56159-263-0. (subscription, Wikilibrary access, or UK public library membership required)
- Everett, Paul (1994). "Releasing the Energy in Italian Instrumental Music: Corelli, Locatelli and Sammartini – Twelve concerti grossi Op. 6, by Arcangelo Corelli; Brandenburg Consort; Roy Goodman; Introduttioni teatrali by Pietro Antonio Locatelli; Freiburger Barockorchester; Thomas Hengelbrock; Sonatas by Giuseppe Battista Sammartini; Giovanni Battista Sammartini; Camerata Köln". Early Music. 22 (3).
- Pascal, Roy (1952). "The Sturm und Drang Movement". Modern Language Review. 47 (2): 129–151. doi:10.2307/3718800. JSTOR 3718800.
