= 1726 in music =

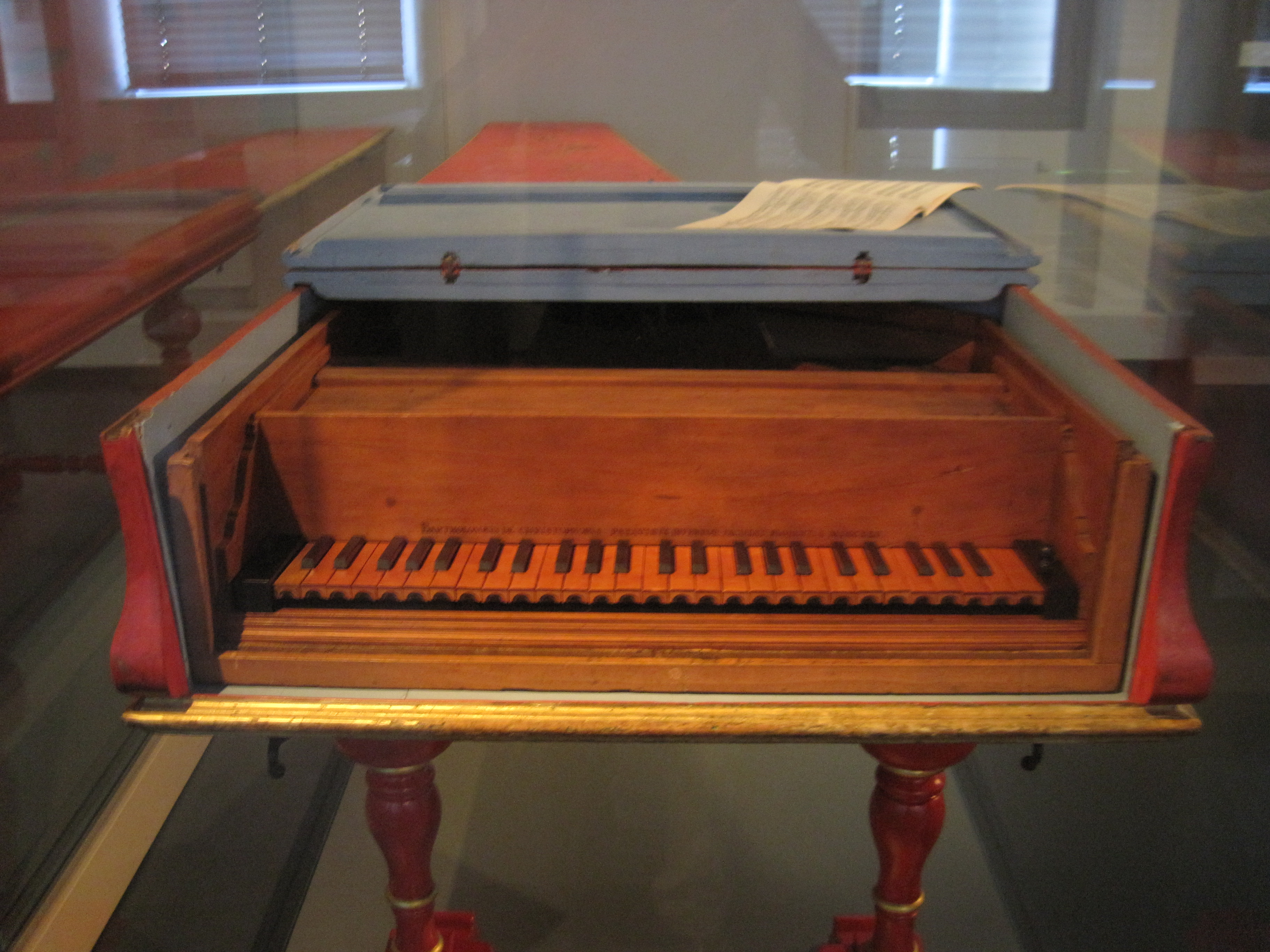
1726 piano by Bartolomeo Cristofori, in the Musical Instrument Museum in Leipzig, Germany.

The year 1726 in music involved some significant events.

== Events ==
- January 20 – J. S. Bach leads the first performance of his cantata Meine Seufzer, meine Tränen (My sighs, my tears), BWV 13, for the second Sunday after Epiphany. In the course of the year, he also copies and performs 18 church cantatas written by his cousin, Johann Ludwig Bach.
- February 1 – The Academy of Ancient Music (formerly the Academy of Vocal Music) is founded in London.
- May 5 – French dancer Marie de Camargo makes her debut at the Paris Opera Ballet in Les Caractères de la Danse.

== Classical music ==
- William Babell – 6 Concertos in 7 Parts, Op. 3
- Johann Ludwig Bach – Ja, mir hast du Arbeit gemacht, JLB 5
- Johann Sebastian Bach
  - Meine Seufzer, meine Tränen, BWV 13
  - Es erhub sich ein Streit, BWV 19
  - Liebster Jesu, mein Verlangen, BWV 32
  - Geist und Seele wird verwirret, BWV 35
  - Brich dem Hungrigen dein Brot, BWV 39
  - Gott fähret auf mit Jauchzen, BWV 43
  - Ich geh' und suche mit Verlangen, BWV 49
  - Falsche Welt, dir trau ich nicht, BWV 52
  - Siehe, ich will viel Fischer aussenden, BWV 88
  - Was Gott tut, das ist wohlgetan, BWV 98
  - Herr, deine Augen sehen nach dem Glauben, BWV 102
  - Vergnügte Ruh, beliebte Seelenlust, BWV 170
  - Fürchte dich nicht, ich bin bei dir, BWV 228
  - 6 Partitas, BWV 825–830, Nos. 1 and 2
- Joseph Bodin de Boismortier
  - Trio Sonatas, Op. 12
  - 6 Sonatas for 2 Bassoons, Op. 14
- Antonio Caldara – Gioseffo che interpreta i sogni
- François Couperin
  - L'Apothéose de Corelli
  - Les Nations
- Henri Desmarets – Adorate eum omnes angeli ejus
- Andre Cardinal Destouches – Les Stratagèmes de l'amour (Ballet)
- Francesco Geminiani – 12 Concerti Grossi after Corelli's Violin Sonatas
- Benedetto Marcello – Estro poetico-armonico (expanded the 1724 version)
- Nicola Porpora – Imeneo in Atene (Serenade)
- Domenico Scarlatti - Fugue du chat
- Giovanni Battista Somis – 12 Violin Sonatas, Op. 4
- Antonio Vivaldi – La Sena festeggiante, RV 693
- Jan Dismas Zelenka
  - Missa Paschalis, ZWV 7
  - Missa Nativitatis Domini, ZWV 8
  - Nisi Dominus, ZWV 92

== Opera ==
- Francisco Antonio de Almeida – La Giuditta
- Tomaso Albinoni – La Statira
- Pietro Auletta – La Carlotta
- Francesco Ciampi – Lucio Vero
- François Francoeur and François Rebel – Pirame et Thisbé
- George Frideric Handel
  - Alessandro, HWV 21
  - Publio Cornelio Scipione, HWV 20
- Johann Adolph Hasse – Astarto
- Giovanni Battista Martini – Azione teatrale
- Nicola Porpora – Meride e Selinunte
- Domenico Sarro – Valdemaro
- Georg Caspar Schürmann - Ludovicus Pius
- Georg Philipp Telemann – Orpheus oder Die wunderbare Beständigkeit der Liebe, Premiered Mar. 9 in Hamburg
- Leonardo Vinci
  - Didone abbandonata
  - L'Ernelinda
  - Gismondo, re di Polonia
  - Siroe, re di Persia
- Antonio Vivaldi
  - Cunegonda
  - Dorilla in Tempe, RV 709
  - La fede tradita e vendicata, RV 712

== Published popular music ==
- "Sally in Our Alley (song)" w.m. Henry Carey. The music played today is an earlier traditional tune.

== Theoretical publications ==
- Jakob Adlung – Musica mechanica organoedi
- Jean-Philippe Rameau – Nouveau système de musique théorique

== Births ==
- March – Joseph Anton Steffan, harpsichordist and composer (died 1797)
- April 12 – Charles Burney, music historian (died 1814)
- August 26 – Karl Kohaut, lutenist and composer (died 1784)
- September 1 – Johann Becker, organist and composer (died 1803)
- September 7 – François-André Danican Philidor, composer and chess player
- December 24 – Johann Hartmann, composer (died 1793)

== Deaths ==
- January 2 – Domenico Zipoli, composer and Jesuit missionary (born 1688)
- May 13 – Francesco Antonio Pistocchi, singer, composer and librettist (born 1659)
- June 18 – Michel Richard Delalande, composer (born 1657)
- July 8 – Antonio Maria Bononcini, cellist and composer (born 1677)
