= Antonio Bioni =

Italian composer

Antonio Bioni (1698–1739) was an Italian composer, best known for his operas, and who, from 1726 onwards, spent a large part of his career working in Wrocław in the Holy Roman Empire.

He was born in Venice.

== Operas ==
- Climene (1722, Chioggia)
- Mitridate (1722, Ferrara)
- Cajo Mario (1722, Ferrara)
- Udine (1722, Venice)
- Orlando furioso (1724, Kuks)
- Armida abbandonata (1725, Prague)
- Armida al campo (1726, Wrocław)
- Endimione (1727, Wrocław)
- Lucio Vero (1727, Wrocław)
- Attalo ed Arsinoe (1727, Wrocław)
- Ariodante (1727, Wrocław)
- Filindo (1728, Wrocław)
- Artabano re de Parti (1728, Wrocław)
- Griselda (1728, Wrocław)
- Nissa ed Elpino (1728, Wrocław)
- Merope (1728, Wrocław)
- Arsinoe (1728, Wrocław)
- La fede tradita e vendicata (1729, Wrocław)
- Engelberta (1729, Wrocław)
- Andromaca (1729/30, Wrocław)
- Il ritorno del figlio con l'abito più approvato (1730, Prague) [with F. Mancini and M. Lucchini]
- Ercole su'l Termodonte (1730, Wrocław)
- Adone (1731, Prague)
- Silvia (1732, Wrocław)
- Siroe (1732, Wrocław)
- Lucio Papirio (1732, Wrocław)
- La verità conosciuta (1732, Wrocław)
- Demetrio (1732, Wrocław)
- Issipile (1732, Wrocław)
- L'Odio placato (1733, Wrocław)
- Artaserse (1733, Wrocław)
- Alessandro Severo (1733, Wrocław)
- Alessandro nell'Indie (1733, Wrocław)
- Girita (1738, Vienna)
