= Giovanni Battista Somis =

Italian composer

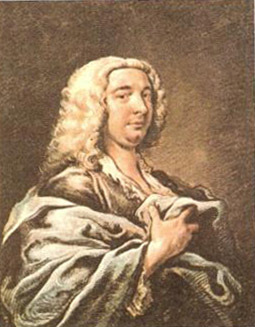
Giovanni Battista Somis

Giovanni Battista Somis (December 25, 1686 – August 14, 1763) was an Italian violinist and composer of the Baroque music era.

He studied under Arcangelo Corelli between 1703 and 1706 or 1707. He was later appointed solo violinist to the king at Turin and leader of the royal band, and seems scarcely ever to have left Turin after these appointments.

A trip to Paris in 1731 to play at the Concert Spirituel produced a report in the April 1733 Le Mercure praising his playing.

He published eight opus numbers in all:

- Opus 1 - 12 sonatas for violin and figured bass (1717 Amsterdam, published by J. Roger)
- Opus 2 - 12 sonatas for violin and figured bass (1723 Turin)
- Opus 3 - 12 sonatas for violin and figured bass (1725 Turin)
- Opus 4 - 12 sonatas for violin and figured bass (1726 Paris)
- Opus 5 - 6 trio sonatas for two violins and figured bass (1733 Paris, published by Boisvin)
- Opus 6 - 12 sonatas for violin and figured bass (1734 Paris)
- Opus 7 - "Ideali trattimenti da camera" for two violins, two flutes or violes (1750 Paris)
- Opus 8 - 6 trio sonatas

A set of twelve sonatas for cello and figured bass was published by LeClerc of Paris around 1740, as well.

He formed a style more brilliant and more emotional, and caused a decided step forward in the art of violin playing. He was the teacher of Jean-Marie Leclair, Felice Giardini, Louis-Gabriel Guillemain, and Chabran, as well as Gaetano Pugnani, and he forms a connecting link between the classical schools of Italy and France. He died in Turin.
