= 1735 in music =

This is a list of notable events in music that took place in the year 1735.

== Events ==
- January 12 – Death of British composer John Eccles; he is succeeded as Master of the King's Musick by Maurice Greene.
- February 18 – John Hippisley's English ballad opera Flora becomes the first opera performed in the United States – at Charleston, South Carolina.
- April 8 – Johann Sebastian Bach revives the anonymous St Luke Passion BWV 246 (BC D 6) at St. Nicholas Church, Leipzig.
- October 25 – Death of Charles Mordaunt, 3rd Earl of Peterborough; shortly before this he has acknowledged opera singer Anastasia Robinson as his wife.

== Popular music ==
- Richard Leveridge – "The Roast Beef of Old England"

== Classical music ==
- Carl Philipp Emanuel Bach
  - Flute Sonata in G major, H.550
  - Trio Sonata in A minor, H.572
- Johann Sebastian Bach
  - Concerto nach italienischen Gusto
  - Overture nach französischer Art
- Wilhelm Friedemann Bach
  - 3 Fugues for Organ with Pedal
  - Harpsichord Concerto in D major, F.41
- Jean-Baptiste Barrière – 6 Cello Sonatas, Book II
- Antonio Caldara – Gesù presentato nel tempio
- Louis-Claude Daquin – Pièces de Clavecin
- Johann Friedrich Fasch – Oboe Concerto, FaWV L:d2
- Francesco Geminiani – 6 Concerti Grossi after Corelli's Trio Sonatas
- Christoph Graupner
  - Trio Sonata in C major, GWV 202
  - Trio Sonata in B-flat major, GWV 217
  - Bassoon Concerto in C major, GWV 301
- Maurice Greene – Lesson in F major, G minor
- Johann Adolph Hasse
  - Miserere in C minor
  - 6 Trio Sonatas, Op. 2
- George Frideric Handel
  - Organ Concerto in G minor, HWV 289
  - Organ Concerto in F major, HWV 292
- Pietro Antonio Locatelli – 6 Introduttioni teatrali e 6 Concerti grossi, Op. 4
- Jean-Joseph Cassanéa de Mondonville – 6 Violin Sonatas, Op. 4 'Les sons harmoniques'
- Giovanni Batista Pergolesi – Orfeo, P.115 (secular cantata)
- Nicola Porpora – 12 Cantate da camera (Dedicated: All' Altezza reale di Federico Prencipe reale di Vallia)
- Johann Christian Schickhardt – L'Alphabet de la Musique, Op. 30
- Georg Philipp Telemann
  - 12 Fantasias for Viol without Bass, TWV 40:26–37 (Hamburg: [Telemann])
  - 6 Sonates corellisantes, for two violins or flutes and basso continuo (Hamburg: [Telemann])
- Lorenzo Gaetano Zavateri – 12 Concerti, Op. 1
- Jan Dismas Zelenka – Gesù al Calvario (oratorio)

== Opera ==
- Antonio Caldara – Scipione Africano
- Egidio Romualdo Duni – Nerone
- François Francœur and François Rebel – Scanderberg
- George Frideric Handel
  - Ariodante, HWV 33 (first performed)
  - Alcina, HWV 34
  - Atalanta, HWV 35 (composed, performed 1736)
- Johann Adolf Hasse – Tito Vespasiano
- Leonardo Leo – Demofoonte (in collaboration with Giuseppe Sellitto, Francesco Mancini and Domenico Sarro)
- Giovanni Battista Pergolesi
  - Il Flaminio
  - L'Olimpiade (first performed, composed 1734)
- Nicola Antonio Porpora
  - Ifigenia In Aulide
  - Polifemo
- Jean-Philippe Rameau – Les Indes galantes (opéra-ballet)
- Francesco Maria Veracini – Adriano In Siria
- Antonio Vivaldi
  - Adelaide, RV 695 (lost)
  - Bajazet, RV 703 (Pasticcio with music by Riccardo Broschi, Geminiano Giacomelli and Johann Adolph Hasse)
  - Griselda, RV 718

== Publications ==
- George Frideric Handel – 6 Fugues, HWV 605–610
- Reinhard Keiser – Dialogus von der Geburt Christi
- Johann Mattheson – Die wol-klingende Finger-Sprache (Hamburg: Composer)
- Georg Philipp Telemann – Fugierende und verändernde Choräle, TWV 31:1–48

== Methods and Theory Writings ==
- Johann Mattheson – Kleine General-Baß-Schule

== Births ==
- January 21 – Johann Gottfried Eckard, pianist and composer (died 1809)
- February 25 – Ernst Wilhelm Wolf, composer (died 1792)
- February 28 – Alexandre-Théophile Vandermonde, musician, mathematician and chemist (died 1796)
- May 13 – Horace Coignet, composer (died 1821)
- June 1 – James Lyon I, composer (died 1794)
- June 6 – Anton Schweitzer, opera composer (died 1787)
- July 10 – Giovanni Bertati, librettist (died 1815)
- September 5 – Johann Christian Bach, composer (died 1782)
- September 6 – John Joseph Merlin, born Jean-Joseph Merlin, clock- and musical-instrument-maker and inventor (died 1803)
- October 30 – Edward Miller, composer (died 1807)
- November 17 – Antoine-Alexandre-Henri Poinsinet, librettist (drowned 1769)
- November 26 – Giambattista Varesco, priest, musician, poet and librettist (died 1805)
- date unknown – Franz Anton Spitzeder, operatic tenor and keyboard teacher (died 1796)

== Deaths ==
- January 12 – John Eccles, composer (born 1668)
- February 27 – John Arbuthnot, patron (born 1667)
- March 24 – Georg Friedrich Kaufmann, organist and composer (born 1679)
- June 22 – Pirro Albergati, aristocrat and amateur composer (born 1663)
- July 18 – Johann Krieger, organist and composer (born 1649)
- November 2 – Šimon Brixi, composer (born 1693)
- date unknown – Jean-Nicolas de Francine, director of the Opéra national de Paris (born 1662)
