= 1737 in music =

== Events ==
- April – George Frideric Handel suffers a probable stroke, resulting in the temporary paralysis of his right arm.
- November 4 – Teatro di San Carlo, Naples, inaugurated with a performance of Domenico Sarro's Achille in Sciro.
- William Boyce conducts the Three Choirs Festival

== Classical music ==
- Carl Philipp Emanuel Bach
  - Harpsichord Concerto in G major, H. 405
  - Flute Sonata in E minor, H. 551
- Johann Sebastian Bach – Mass in G major, BWV 236
- Christoph Graupner – Concerto for Chalumeau, Bassoon and Cello in C major, GWV 306
- George Frideric Handel – Funeral Anthem for Queen Caroline, HWV 264
- Leonardo Leo
  - Cello Concerto in D major, L. 10
  - Cello Concerto in A major, L. 20
  - Cello Concerto in F minor, L. 40
- Nicola Porpora – Il Gedeone (sacred oratorio)
- Gottfried Heinrich Stölzel – Ehre sei Gott in der Höhe, H. 342
- Jan Dismas Zelenka
  - Requiem, ZWV 45 (attribution is contested)
  - 6 Ave Regina Coelorum, ZWV 128
  - Il diamante, ZWV 177

== Opera ==
- Domenico Alberti – Endimione
- Giovanni Bononcini – Zenobia
- Riccardo Broschi – Merope
- George Frideric Handel
  - Arminio (first performed, composed in 1736))
  - Giustino, HWV 37 (first performed, composed in 1736)
  - Berenice, HWV 38 (completed, first performed)
  - Faramondo, HWV 39 (composed, first performed 1738)
- Johann Adolph Hasse – Asteria
- John Frederick Lampe and Henry Carey – The Dragon of Wantley
- Leonardo Leo
  - L'Olimpiade
  - Siface
- Jean-Philippe Rameau – Castor et Pollux
- Nicola Antonio Porpora – Lucio Papirio
- Domenico Sarro – Achille in Sciro
- Antonio Vivaldi
  - Catone In Utica
  - Oracolo in Messenia, RV 726

== Publications ==
- Joseph Bodin de Boismortier – 9 Sonatas and Chaconne, Op. 66
- Nicolas Chédeville – Il Pastor Fido Sonatas (originally attributed to Vivaldi as his Op. 13)
- Michel Corrette – Premier Livre d’Orgue, Op. 16
- Charles Dollé – Pièces de viole, Op. 2
- Giovanni Battista Ferrandini – 6 Sonatas, Op. 2
- Charles-Joseph van Helmont – Pièces de Clavecin, Op. 1
- Jean-Marie Leclair
  - 6 Violin Concertos, Op. 7
  - Deuxième recréation de musique d’une execution facile, Op. 8 (Paris)
- Pietro Locatelli – 12 Sonate da camera, Op. 6
- Il Maestro di Musica – Pasticcio with music by Pietro Auletta, Giovanni Battista Pergolesi, Alessandro Parisotti
- Ohrenvergnügendes und gemütergötzendes Tafelkonfekt, Augsburg. (includes works by Valentin Rathgeber)

== Methods and theory writings ==
- Carl Johann Friedrich Haltmeier – Anleitung zum Transponieren
- Jacques Hotteterre – Méthode pour la musette, Op. 10
- David Kellner – Treulicher Unterricht im General-Baß
- John Frederick Lampe – A Plain and Compendious Method of Teaching Thorough Bass
- Johann Mattheson – Kern Melodischer Wissenschafft
- Jean-Phillipe Rameau – Génération harmonique, ou Traité de musique théorique et pratique
- Johann Adolph Scheibe – Der critische Musicus

== Births ==
- January 3 – Heinrich Wilhelm von Gerstenberg, poet and librettist (died 1823)
- January 19 – Giuseppe Millico, castrato singer, composer and music teacher (died 1802)
- March 9 – Josef Mysliveček, composer (died 1781)
- April 10 – François Giroust (died 1799)
- September 14 – Michael Haydn, composer (died 1806)
- September 21 – Francis Hopkinson (died 1791)
- November 25 – Christian Friedrich Penzel (died 1801)
- date unknown
  - William Paxton, cellist and composer (died 1781)
  - Frederick Charles Reinhold, operatic bass (died 1815)
  - Marguerite Morel, Ballerina, actress and singer.

== Deaths ==
- February 12 – Benjamin Schmolck, Lutheran hymn-writer (born 1672)
- September 22
  - Michel Pignolet de Montéclair, composer (born 1667)
  - Francesco Mancini, composer and music teacher (born 1672)
- December 18 – Antonio Stradivari, violin-maker (born 1644)
