= 1736 in music =

== Events ==
- January 21 – Charles Theodore Pachelbel gives a public concert in New York City, the first documented event of its kind. Pachelbel, son of the more famous Johann Pachelbel, settles in Charleston, South Carolina, where he works as an organist, harpsichordist, composer and music teacher for the rest of his life.
- March 29 Johann Sebastian Bach revives his St Matthew Passion BWV 244 (BC D 3b) with some instrumentation, vocal, and textual changes from earlier version (BC D 3a) and scored separately for two choirs and orchestras (with two continuo parts) at St. Thomas Church, Leipzig.
- May 12 – In celebration of the marriage of Frederick, Prince of Wales, Handel's opera Atalanta is premièred at Covent Garden Theatre.
- November 25 – A three-manual, 43-stop organ, built by Gottfried Silbermann, is dedicated at the new Frauenkirche in Dresden.
- December 1 – J. S. Bach gives a recital on the Silbermann organ at the Dresden Frauenkirche.
- specific date not listed
  - Domenico Alberti is in Spain as Venetian ambassador. Opera singer Farinelli is impressed by Alberti's amateur singing.
  - Antonio Lotti becomes maestro di cappella at St Mark's Cathedral, Venice.
- The first major instrument manufacturer in North America, John Clemm, comes to Philadelphia, where he will establish an organ and piano business.
- Hanover, Virginia, hosts the first documented fiddling contest in the country.

== Classical music ==
- Carl Philipp Emanuel Bach – Keyboard Sonata in G major, H.15
- Johann Sebastian Bach
  - Dir zu Liebe, wertes Herze, BWV Anh.41 (authorship unknown)
- George Frideric Handel
  - Alexander's Feast, HWV 75 (See also: Concerto Grosso in C major, HWV 318)
  - Cecilia, volgi un sguardo, HWV 89
  - Look down, harmonious saint, HWV 124
- Johann Adolf Hasse – Salve regina in A major
- Giovanni Battista Pergolesi – Stabat Mater
- Jan Dismas Zelenka
  - Missa Sanctissimae Trinitatis, ZWV 17
  - Alma redemptoris Mater, ZWV 126

== Opera ==
- Antonio Caldara – Temistocle
- Francesco Durante – Abigaile
- Mademoiselle Duval – Les Génies ou Les Caractères de l'amour
- George Frideric Handel
  - Atalanta HWV 35 (performed, composed 1735)
  - Arminio, HWV 36 (composed, first performed 12 January 1737)
  - Giustino, HWV 37 (composed, first performed 16 February 1737)
  - Berenice, HWV 38 (composition begun)
  - Alexander's Feast (HWV 75) (first performed February 19)
- Leonardo Leo
  - Farnace
  - L'Olympiade
- Nicola Antonio Porpora
  - La Festa d'Imeneo
  - Mitridate (revised)
  - Orfeo (in collaboration with Carlo Broschi, Leonardo Vinci, Johann Adolph Hasse and Francesco Araja.)
- Giovanni Alberto Ristori – Le fate

== Publications ==
- Jean-Baptiste Barrière – 6 Cello Sonatas, Book 3
- Joseph Bodin de Boismortier
  - Quatre suites de pièces de clavecin, Op. 59 (Paris)
  - Les Voyages de l'Amour, Op. 60 (ballet) (Paris)
  - Six sonates, for treble viol and basso continuo, Op. 61 (Paris)
  - 6eme Recueil d’airs à boire et sérieuxe, Op. 62 (Paris)
  - Six sonates, for two treble viols, Op. 63 (Paris)
- Pietro Castrucci – 12 Concerti Grossi, Op. 3
- Jean-Pierre Guignon
  - Pieces à 2 violons, Op. 8
  - Nouvelles variations de divers airs et les Folies d'Espagne, Op. 9
- Johann Adolph Hasse – Siroe, re di Persia (published, first performed 1733)
- Jean-Marie Leclair – Première recréation de musique d’une execution facile, Op. 6 (Paris)
- Pietro Locatelli – 6 Trio Sonatas, Op. 5
- Franz Anton Maichelbeck – 8 Keyboard Sonatas, Op. 1
- Benedetto Marcello – 6 Sonatas for 2 Cellos, Op. 2
- Giovanni Batista Pergolesi – Luce degli occhi miei, P.110 (published posthumously)
- Nicolo Antonio Porpora – 6 Sinfonie da camera, Op. 2
- Giuseppe Sammartini
  - 6 Trio Sonatas, Op. 1
  - 12 Flute Sonatas, Op. 2
- Georg Christian Schemelli – Musicalisches Gesang-Buch (anthology of J.S. Bach choral settings)
- Georg Philipp Telemann
  - VI Moralische Kantaten, for soprano and basso continuo, TWV 20:23-28 (Hamburg: [Telemann])
  - VI Ouvertures à 4 ou 6 (Hamburg: [Telemann])
- Carlo Tessarini – 12 Violin Sonatas, Op. 3

== Methods and theory publications ==
- Michel Pignolet de Montéclair – Principes de musique
- Jose de Torres y Martínez Bravo – Reglas generales de acompañar

== Births ==
- February 3 – Johann Georg Albrechtsberger, musician (died 1809)
- June 3 – Ignaz Fränzl, violinist and composer (died 1811)
- June 28 – Gottlieb Konrad Pfeffel (died 1809)
- August 15 – Johann Christoph Kellner, organist and composer (died 1803)
- October 27 – James Macpherson, librettist (died 1796)
- November 18 – Carl Friedrich Christian Fasch, harpsichordist and composer (died 1800)
- December 20 – Hans Moritz von Brühl (died 1809)

== Deaths ==
- February 13 – Charles Desmazures (born 1669)
- March 16 – Giovanni Battista Pergolesi, composer (born 1710)
- May 7 – John Weldon, composer (born 1676)
- August 21 – Emanuele d'Astorga, composer (born 1681)
- December 28 – Antonio Caldara, composer (born c.1670)
- date unknown – Joseph Michel, chorister, composer and music teacher (born 1688)
