= 1722 in music =

The year 1722 in music involved some significant events.

== Events ==
- Tomaso Albinoni becomes opera director to the Elector of Bavaria.
- André Campra becomes vice-maitre-de-chapelle of the Chapelle Royale at Versailles.
- In a staged quarrel, Francesco Maria Veracini comes into conflict with Johann David Heinichen and the singer Senesino, ending with his leaping from a third storey window. He will walk with a limp for the rest of his life.
- Johann Friedrich Fasch is appointed Kapellmeister at Zerbst, where he will remain for the rest of his life.
- Johann Sebastian Bach produces the first of his Notebooks for Anna Magdalena Bach.
- Jean-Philippe Rameau publishes the Traité de l'harmonie réduite à ses principes naturels.

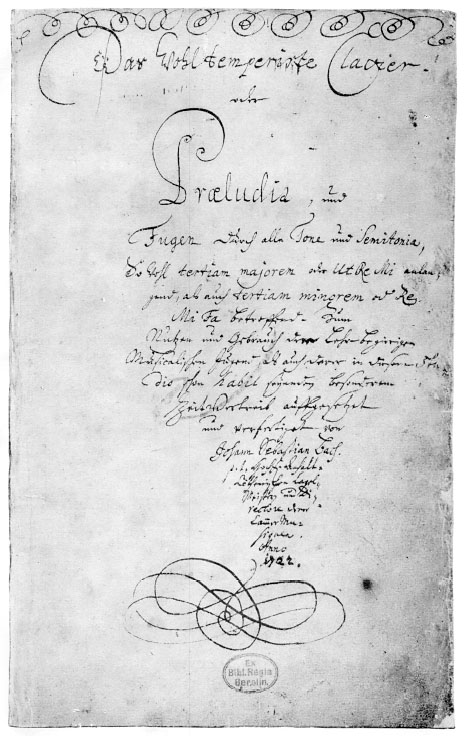
Bach's Clavier.

== Classical music ==
- Tomaso Albinoni – Concertos à cinque, Op. 9 (published)
- Johann Sebastian Bach
  - Das wohltemperierte Klavier, vol 1
- Giovanni Bononcini – Divertimenti da camera
- François Couperin – Pièces de clavecin, Book 3
- Jan Dismas Zelenka – Trio Sonatas (6) for 2 Oboes, Bassoon and Basso Continuo

== Opera ==
- Carlo Arrigoni – La vedova
- Baldassare Galuppi – La fede nell'incostanza ossia gli amici rivali
- Nicola Porpora – Gli Orti Esperidi (libretto by Metastasio)
- Leonardo Vinci – Le Zite 'n Calera
- Giovanni Bononcini - Griselda

== Births ==
- January 18 – Antonio Rodríguez de Hita, composer (d. 1787)
- January 28 – Johann Ernst Bach II, composer (d. 1777)
- June 30 – Jiří Antonín Benda, composer (d. 1795)
- October 2 – Leopold Widhalm, luthier
- December 3 – Hryhorii Skovoroda, poet, philosopher and composer (d. 1794)
- probable – Francis Hutcheson, songwriter (died 1773)

== Deaths ==
- April 16 – Johann Jacob Bach, musician and composer (b. 1682)
- June 5 – Johann Kuhnau, composer (born 1660)
- July 11 – Johann Joseph Vilsmayr, violinist and composer (b. 1663)
- November 24 – Johann Adam Reincken, organist (born 1623)
- date unknown – Antonio Tarsia, composer (b. 1643)
