= 1728 in music =

The year 1728 in music involved some significant events.

== Events ==
- January 29 – John Gay's The Beggar's Opera (with music arranged by Johann Christoph Pepusch) opens at John Rich's Lincoln's Inn Fields Theatre in London and has a first run of 62 performances, initiating the ballad opera genre (a satire of Italian opera). Polly Peachum is played by Lavinia Fenton, while the part of Captain Macheath is taken by Thomas Walker who on August 24 presents his parodic version The Quaker's Opera at Lee and Harper's booth in Bartholomew Fair (London) which includes the first known record of a version of the traditional English folk tune "Country Gardens".
- March 26 – Johann Sebastian Bach revives his St John Passion (BWV 245, BC D 2c) with some textual and instrumental changes.
- Giuseppe Tartini opens a school for violinists in Padua.
- Johann Georg Pisendel begins studying composition under Johann David Heinichen.
- Domenico Scarlatti returns to Rome, where he meets his first wife.
- Johann Joachim Quantz visits Berlin and performs in the presence of the Crown Prince of Prussia, who insists on taking lessons from him.
- Deafness forces Johann Mattheson to retire from his post as musical director of Hamburg Cathedral.
- In music theory, the circle of fifths is described by Johann David Heinichen in his treatise Der Generalbass in der Composition, the first such description in Western European literature

== Classical music ==
- Johann Sebastian Bach – Partita in D major, BWV 828
- Jean Francois Dandrieu – Pieces de Clavecin, Book 2
- Giovanni Antonio Guido – Scherzi armonici sopra le quattro staggioni dell'anno, Op. 3
- Jean-Marie Leclair – 12 Violin Sonatas, Op. 2
- Vincent Lübeck – Clavier Übung for harpsichord
- Michel Pignolet de Montéclair – Morte di Lucretia
- Jean-Philippe Rameau – Cantates Françaises
- Thomas Roseingrave – Voluntarys and Fugues
- Giuseppe Tartini – 6 Violin Concertos, Op. 1
- Georg Philipp Telemann
  - Der getreue Music-Meister (editor, continues through 1729) Hamburg: [Telemann].
    - Das Frauenzimmer verstimmt sich immer, song for voice and basso continuo, TWV 25:37, lection 5
    - Ich kann lachen, weinen, scherzen (cantata, words by M. von Ziegler), for soprano and basso continuo, TWV 20:15, lections 19–20.
    - Intrada, nebst burlesquer Suite (nicknamed "Gulliver Suite") for two violins unaccompanied, TWV 40:108
    - Säume nicht geliebte Schöne, song for voice and basso continuo), TWV 25:38, lection 21

== Opera ==
- Bartolomeo Cordans – Ormisda
- Geminiano Giacomelli – Gianguir
- George Frideric Handel
  - Siroe, re di Persia, HWV 24
  - Tolomeo, re di Egitto
- Leonardo Leo
  - Catone in Utica
  - La pastorella commattuta, librettist Tommaso Mariani
- Johann Christoph Pepusch – The Beggar's Opera
- Leonardo Vinci
  - Catone in Utica
  - Didone Abandonnata
  - Medo

== Musical theater ==
- John Gay – The Beggar's Opera

== Births ==
- January 16 – Niccolò Piccinni, composer of over 100 operas (died 1800)
- January 17 – Johann Gottfried Müthel, keyboard virtuoso and composer (died 1788)
- September 21 – Louis Emmanuel Eadin, composer
- December 9 – Pietro Alessandro Guglielmi, composer (died 1804)
- December 21 – Hermann Raupach, composer (died 1778)
- December 25 – Johann Adam Hiller, composer (died 1804)

== Deaths ==
- February 12 – Agostino Steffani, composer and diplomat (born 1653)
- August 15 – Marin Marais, composer and bass-viol player (born 1656)
- October 8 – Anne Danican Philidor, composer and founder of the Concert Spirituel (born 1681)
- November 19 – Leopold, Prince of Anhalt-Köthen, employer of Johann Sebastian Bach (born 1694) (smallpox)
- probable – Gaetano Greco, composer (born c. 1657)
