= 1724 in music =

The year 1724 in music involved some significant musical events.

== Events ==
- Johann Sebastian Bach composes the Sanctus for his later Mass in B minor.
- John Frederick Lampe arrives in Britain.
- Joseph Bodin de Boismortier moves to Paris from Perpignan.
- Agostino Steffani is elected honorary president of the Academy of Antient Musick in London.
- Johann Adolph Hasse arrives in Naples.
- The Le Saraste violin is made by Antonio Stradivari (now owned by the Real Concervatorio Superior de Música in Madrid, Spain).
- In Rome, Domenico Scarlatti meets Farinelli and Johann Joachim Quantz.
- Marriage of the daughter of music publisher Jean-Baptiste-Christophe Ballard to the printer François Boivin.
- Sébastien de Brossard's collection of manuscripts is bought by King Louis XV of France.
- Renatus Harris builds his last organ, that of St Dionis Backchurch in the City of London.
- 7 April Johann Sebastian Bach premieres his St John Passion (BWV 245, BC D 2a) at St. Nicholas Church, Leipzig.

== Published music ==
- Attilio Ariosti
  - 6 Cantatas (London)
  - 6 Lessons, for viola d'amore and basso continuo (London)
- Francesco Barsanti – Sonate [6], for recorder or violin and continuo, Op. 1 (London)
- Joseph Bodin de Boismortier – Cantates françoises (Les Quatre Saisons) (four cantatas for solo voice, various instruments, and basso continuo), Op. 5 (Paris)
- François Couperin – Les goûts-réunis, ou Nouveaux concerts (Paris)
- William Croft – Musica sacra
- Jean-François Dandrieu – Pièces de clavecin, Book 1
- Francesco Mancini – XII Solos for recorder and continuo (London)
- Thomas Marc – Suitte de pièces de dessus et de pardessus de viole
- Benedetto Marcello – Estro poetico-armonico: parafrasi sopra li primi venticinque salmi, vols. 1–4 (Venice: Appresso Domenico Lovisa)
- Jean-Philippe Rameau – Pieces de Clavessin

== Classical music ==
- Johann Sebastian Bach
  - Wo soll ich fliehen hin, BWV 5
  - Christ unser Herr zum Jordan kam, BWV 7
  - Liebster Gott, wenn werd ich sterben?, BWV 8
  - Meine Seel erhebt den Herren, BWV 10
  - St John Passion (first performance at St. Nicolaikirche in Leipzig)
  - Wer da gläubet und getauft wird, BWV 37
  - Aus tiefer Not schrei ich zu dir, BWV 38
  - Sie werden euch in den Bann tun, BWV 44
  - Herr Christ, der einge Gottessohn, BWV 96
  - Was Gott tut, das ist wohlgetan, BWV 99
  - Nimm von uns, Herr, du treuer Gott, BWV 101
  - Du Hirte Israel, höre, BWV 104
  - Du Friedefürst, Herr Jesu Christ, BWV 116
  - Christum wir sollen loben schon, BWV 121
  - Ach Herr, mich armen Sünder, BWV 135
  - Wo gehest du hin, BWV 166
  - Schmücke dich, o liebe Seele, BWV 180
  - Leichtgesinnte Flattergeister, BWV 181
  - Erwünschtes Freudenlicht, BWV 184
- George Frideric Handel – Silete venti, HWV 242
- Turlough O'Carolan – John Drury (composed for the wedding of a local couple, John Drury and Elizabeth Goldsmith)
- Jan Dismas Zelenka – De profundis, ZWV 97

== Opera ==
- Attilio Ariosti
  - Artaserse (London, King's Theatre, 1 December)
  - Aquilio consolo (London, King's Theatre, 21 May)
  - Vespasiano (London, King's Theatre, 14 January)
- Antonio Caldara – Gianguir
- George Frideric Handel
  - Giulio Cesare (Julius Caesar), HWV 17
  - Tamerlano (Tamburlaine), HWV 18
- Dominico Sarro – Didone abbandonata
- Leonardo Vinci
  - Eraclea
  - Farnace
  - Ifigenia in Tauride
  - La Rosmira fedele
  - Turno Aricino
- Antonio Vivaldi
  - Il Giustino RV 717
  - La virtù trionfante dell'amore e dell'odio, ovvero il Tigrane, RV 740 (co-composed with Benedetto Micheli and Nicola Romaldi)

== Theoretical writings ==
- Edward Betts – An Introduction to the Skill of Musick
- Tomás Pereira – Lulu Zhengyi Xubian
- William Turner – Sound Anatomiz’d in A Philosophical Essay on Musick

== Births ==
- February 26 – Gottfried Heinrich Bach, mentally handicapped son of Johann Sebastian Bach (d. 1763)
- July 18 – Duchess Maria Antonia of Bavaria, composer, singer, harpsichordist and patron (d. 1780)
- August 28 – Diamante Medaglia Faini, Italian poet and composer (died 1770)
- August 29 – Giovanni Battista Casti, opera librettist (died 1803)
- September 14 – Ignaz Vitzthumb, composer and conductor (died 1816)
- October 1 – Giovanni Battista Cirri, cellist and composer (died 1808)
- December 8 – Claude Balbastre, organist, harpsichordist and composer (died 1799)
- date unknown – Joan Rossell, Catalan composer (died 1780)

== Deaths ==
- March 7 – Wolfgang Nicolaus Pertl, musician and grandfather of Wolfgang Amadeus Mozart
- May 21 – Antonio Salvi, librettist for Vivaldi (born 1664)
- June 7 (buried) – Johann Hugo von Wilderer, composer (born c.1670)
- June 24 – Johann Theile, singer and composer (born 1646)
- August 24 – Andreas Kneller, composer (born 1649)
- probable
  - John Abell, countertenor, composer and lutenist (born 1653)
  - Antonio Quintavalle, opera composer
