= 1742 in music =

List of years in music	(table)
- … 1732; 1733; 1734; 1735; 1736; 1737; 1738; 1739; 1740; 1741; 1742; 1743; 1744; 1745; 1746; 1747; 1748; 1749; 1750; 1751; 1752 …
- Art; Archaeology; Architecture; Literature; Music; Philosophy; Science; +...

== Events ==
- March 23 – Johann Sebastian Bach revives his St Matthew Passion BWV 244 (BC D 3b) with some further revisions of instrumentation and voicing at St. Thomas Church, Leipzig: the work is now scored with a ripieno soprano choir and viola da gamba and harpsichord in the second orchestra (the organ for this orchestra is under repair).
- April 13 – First performance of Handel's oratorio Messiah staged at the Music Hall in Fishamble Street, Dublin in aid of local charities. Matthew Dubourg leads the orchestra. Handel leaves Ireland on 13 August.
- December 7 – The Berlin Court Opera is inaugurated with a performance of Carl Heinrich Graun's Cleopatra e Cesare.
- Joseph Benda joins the Prussian royal orchestra.

== Publications ==
- Carl Philipp Emanuel Bach – 6 Harpsichord Sonatas, Wq.48 (Nuremberg: Balthasar Schmid) (composed 1740–1742)
- Francesco Barsanti – A Collection of Old Scots Tunes(Edinburgh: Alexander Baillie)
- Jean-Joseph Mouret – Motets à une et deux voix avec symphonie (Paris: la Veuve Mouret, Mme Boivin, Le Sr Le Clerc)
- Jacques-Christophe Naudot – 6 Concertos en quatre parties, for hurdy-gurdy, musette, flute, recorder, or oboe, with two violins and continuo, Op. 17 (Paris)
- John Parry – Antient British music, or A collection of tunes, never before published, which are retained by the Cambro-Britons... part 1, containing 24 airs... (London: Mickleborough), compiled with Evan Williams, contains the first appearance of the melody now used for "Deck the Halls"

== Classical music ==
- Carl Philipp Emanuel Bach
  - Harpsichord Concerto in G major, H.412, Wq. 9
  - 6 Harpsichord Sonatas, Wq.49 (published 1744)
- Johann Sebastian Bach
  - Mer hahn en neue Oberkeet, BWV 212 ("Peasant Cantata")
  - The Art of Fugue (Die Kunst der Fuge), BWV 1080, earliest known manuscript (P200)
- Louis-Nicolas Clérambault – Motets, Book I (Books I–V were all composed and published between 1742–1760 but no exact dates survive)
- Michel Corrette – Concerto Turc (No. 19 from Concertos Comiques)
- Christoph Graupner
  - Trio Sonata in G minor, GWV 215
  - Concerto for 2 Chalumeaux in C major, GWV 303
- George Frideric Handel – Messiah (first performed, composed 1741)
- Johann Adolph Hasse – I pellegrini al sepolcro di Nostro Signore (oratorio)
- Giovanni Battista Martini – 12 Sonate d’intavolatura per l’organo e ’l cembalo (published 1747 in Bologna)
- Johann Melchio Molter
  - Clarinet Concerto in D major, MWV 6.36
  - Clarinet Concerto in D major, MWV 6.38
- Jacques-Christophe Naudot – Suite en trio, Op. 18
- Giovanni Benedetto Platti – 6 Harpsichord Sonatas 'sur le goût italien' (published in Nuremberg, 1742)
- Franz Xaver Richter – Kemptener Te Deum
- Giovanni Battista Sammartini – 12 Sonatas, Op. 2
- Domenico Scarlatti – Keyboard sonatas K. 31–93 presented to the queen.

== Opera ==
- Giuseppe Carcani – Demetrio
- Baldassare Galuppi – Scipione in Cartagine
- Carl Heinrich Graun – Cesare e Cleopatra
- Johann Adolph Hasse
  - La Didone abbandonata
  - Lucio Papirio
- Niccolò Jommelli – Don Chichibio
- Leonardo Leo – Andromaca
- Gennaro Manna – Tito Manlio

== Methods and theory writings ==
Francesco Valls – Mapa Armónico Práctico

== Births ==
- January 15 – Simon Leduc (died 1777)
- May 8 – Jean-Baptiste Krumpholz, Czech composer (died 1790)
- July 19 – Jean-Baptiste Davaux (died 1822)
- August 19 – Jean Dauberval, French dancer (died 1806)
- Probable date – Martha Ray, English singer (murdered 1779)

== Deaths ==
- January 24 (buried) – Benedikt Anton Aufschnaiter, Austrian composer (born 1665)
- April 16 – Stefano Benedetto Pallavicino, Paduan-born librettist (born 1672)
- June 28 – Jan Josef Ignác Brentner, Czech composer (born 1689)
- July 22 – Andrea Adami da Bolsena, Italian castrato, master of the papal choir (born 1663)
- July 12 – Evaristo Felice Dall'Abaco, Veronese-born violinist and composer (born 1675)
- August 25 – Carlos Seixas, Portuguese composer (born 1704)
- date unknown
  - Matteo Goffriller, Italian cello-maker (born 1659)
  - Giovanni Mossi (born c. 1680)
