= 1746 in music =

List of years in music	(table)
- … 1736; 1737; 1738; 1739; 1740; 1741; 1742; 1743; 1744; 1745; 1746; 1747; 1748; 1749; 1750; 1751; 1752; 1753; 1754; 1755; 1756 …
- Art; Archaeology; Architecture; Literature; Music; Philosophy; Science; +...

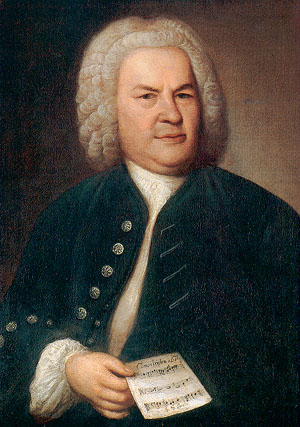
Johann Sebastian Bach in 1746

== Events ==
- April 8 Johann Sebastian Bach performs a copy he made of the Brockes Passion HWV 48 of George Frideric Handel at St. Thomas Church, Leipzig.
- Elias Gottlob Haussmann completes his famous portrait of Johann Sebastian Bach
- 1746–1747 Bach adds two Chorale preludes (BWV 664 and 665) to his manuscript of the Great Eighteen Chorale Preludes.

== Classical music ==
- Carl Philipp Emanuel Bach
  - Harpsichord Concerto in A major, H.422
  - Harpsichord Concerto in C major, H.423
  - Viola da Gamba Sonata in D major, H.559
- Johann Sebastian Bach
  - Sechs Choräle von verschiedener Art
  - Canon in G major, BWV 1076
- Francesco Feo – S. Francesco di Sales (sacred oratorio) first performed
- Francesco Geminiani
  - 6 Cello Sonatas, Op. 5
  - 6 Concertos, Op.7
- Christoph Willibald Gluck – 6 Trio Sonatas, Wq.53
- Christoph Graupner – Ach Herr, mich armen Suender (cantata)
- Joannes de Gruytters – his carillon book.
- George Frideric Handel
  - Occasional Oratorio, HWV 62 with words by Newburgh Hamilton
  - Concerto in D major, HWV 335a (contributed to the Music for the Royal Fireworks)
- Niccolò Pasquali – Sonatas for two cellos
- Giovanni Benedetto Platti – 6 Harpsichord Sonatas, Op. 4 (parts of which have been attributed to Benedetto Marcello)
- Joseph-Nicolas-Pancrace Royer – Pièces de clavecin
- Rudolf Straube – 2 Lute Sonatas
- Giuseppe Tartini – 3 Violin Concertos, Libro 1

== Popular music ==
- From Scourging Rebellion by George Frideric Handel

== Opera ==
- Andrea Adolfati – La pace fra la virtù e la bellezza
- Thomas Arne – Neptune and Amphitrite
- Matteo Capranica – Alcibiade
- Carl Heinrich Graun – Demofoonte, GraunWV B:I:13
- Niccolò Jommelli – Didone abbandonata
- Jean-Marie Leclair – Scylla et Glaucus

== Publications ==
- Burke Thumoth – 12 English and 12 Irish Airs with Variations (London: J. Simpson)
- Anonymous – The Compleat Tutor for the French Horn (London: John Simpson)

== Methods and theory writings ==
- William Tans'ur – A New Musical Grammar

== Births ==
- January 11 – František Adam Míča, Czech composer (died 1811)
- January 23 – Pierre-Ulric Dubuisson, translator and actor (died 1794)
- February 13 – Giuseppe Maria Cambini, Italian composer (died 1825)
- April 4 – Alexandre-Louis Robineau, librettist (died 1823)
- June 2– Wilhelm Cramer, composer and violinist (died 1799)
- June 3 (probable) – James Hook (composer), composer (died 1827)
- June 29 – Joachim Heinrich Campe, German librettist (died 1818)
- July 2 – Hartenack Otto Conrad Zinck, Danish composer (died 1832)
- August 21 – Ignaz Umlauf, Austrian composer (died 1796)
- September 3 – Friedrich Wilhelm Gotter, librettist and poet (died 1797)
- September 20 – Christian Benjamin Uber, German composer (died 1812)
- September 26 – Giovanni Punto, composer and horn player (died 1803)
- October 4 – Domenico Corri, Italian composer (died 1825)
- October 7 – William Billings, American composer (died 1800)
- October 12 – Emerico Lobo de Mesquita, composer and collaborator (died 1805)
- October 22 – Hector Macneill, librettist and poet (died 1818)
- November 15 – Joseph Quesnel, composer (died 1809)
- December 19 – Venanzio Rauzzini, collector and opera singer (died 1810)
- December 21 – Ludwig Christoph Heinrich Hölty, librettist and poet (died 1776)
- unknown date - Avdotya Mikhaylova, opera singer (died 1807)

== Deaths ==
- March 16 – Jean Baptiste Matho, French composer (born 1663)
- March 30 – Jean-Joseph Fiocco, composer (b. 1686)
- May 15 – Giovanni Antonio Ricieri, composer
- August 27 – Johann Caspar Ferdinand Fischer, German composer
- October 14 – Domenico Alberti, Italian composer (born c. 1700)
- December 6 – Grizel Baillie, librettist and composer (born 1665)
- December 10 – Teodorico Pedrini, priest, musician and composer (b. 1671)
- unknown date – Jean-Baptiste Malter, dancer (b. 1701)
