= 1749 in music =

List of years in music	(table)
- … 1739; 1740; 1741; 1742; 1743; 1744; 1745; 1746; 1747; 1748; 1749; 1750; 1751; 1752; 1753; 1754; 1755; 1756; 1757; 1758; 1759 …
- Art; Archaeology; Architecture; Literature; Music; Philosophy; Science; +...

== Events ==
- March 4 – Johann Sebastian Bach revives (for the last time under his leadership) his St John Passion BWV 245 (BC D 2d) with some textual and instrumentational changes at St. Nicholas Church, Leipzig. In it, he uses the contrabassoon for the first time (as a continuo instrument).
- March 17 – George Frideric Handel's oratorio Solomon first performed, at the Theatre Royal in London.
- April 27 – The first official performance of Handel's Music for the Royal Fireworks, in London, finishes early due to the outbreak of fire.
- May 27 – Handel stages a benefit concert at and for the Foundling Hospital in London at which the Foundling Hospital Anthem is premiered.
- 1749–1750 – Bach revises his The Art of Fugue BWV 1080, but the project will be left incomplete by his death and published in 1751 by his son Carl Philipp Emanuel Bach in Berlin.

== Popular Music ==
- Charles Wesley – "Soldiers of Christ, Arise" (hymn)

== Classical music ==
- Carl Philipp Emanuel Bach
  - Magnificat (Berlin version)
  - Flute Sonata in E major, H.506
- Johann Sebastian Bach – Mass in B minor
- George Frideric Handel
  - Theodora, HWV 68, oratorio (composed, first performed 1750)
  - Music for the Royal Fireworks, HWV 351
- Niccolò Jommelli – La cantata e disfida di Don Trastullo (secular cantata)

== Opera ==
- Joseph-Hyacinthe Ferrand – Zélie
- Baldassare Galuppi – L'Arcadia in Brenta
- Carl Heinrich Graun – Coriolano, GraunWV B:I:20
- George Frideric Handel – Alceste, HWV 45
- Jean-Joseph de Mondonville – Le carnaval du Parnasse
- José Nebra – El mágico Apolonio
- Jean-Philippe Rameau – Zoroastre, RCT 62

== Publications ==
- Claude-Bénigne Balbastre – Livre contenant des pièces de différent genre
- Richard Mudge – 6 Concertos in 7 Parts
- Filippo Palma – Sei arie con istromenti, Op. 3 (London)

== Methods and theory writings ==
- Michel Corrette – Les Amusemens du Parnasse (Methods books that were published in 8 volumes from 1749–1772)
- Francesco Geminiani – A Treatise of Good Taste in the Art of Musick
- Philipp Christoph Hartung – Musicus Theoretico-Practicus
- Friedrich Wilhelm Marpurg – Der critische Musicus an der Spree
- Johann Mattheson – Abhandlung von den Pantomimen

== Births ==
- January 16 – Vittorio Alfieri, librettist and dramatist (died 1803)
- March 10 – Lorenzo Da Ponte, Italian librettist (died 1838)
- May – Elisabeth Soligny, French ballerina and ballet mistress
- May 5 – Jean-Frédéric Edelmann, composer (died 1794)
- June 15 – Georg Joseph Vogler, (known as Abbé Vogler) German composer, teacher and theorist (died 1814)
- August 21 – Edvard Storm, librettist and poet (died 1794)
- August 28 – Johann Wolfgang von Goethe, librettist and writer (died 1832)
- September 1 – Lorenz Leopold Haschka, librettist and writer (died 1827)
- October 4 – Jean-Louis Duport, composer and cellist (died 1819)
- December 17 – Domenico Cimarosa, composer (died 1801)
- December 30 – Anton Kraft, Czech composer (died 1820)
- date unknown – Marija Zubova, composer (d. 1799)

== Deaths ==
- February 7 – André Cardinal Destouches, French composer of opera (born 1672)
- June 11 – Johann Bernhard Bach, organist and composer, second cousin of Johann Sebastian Bach (born 1676)
- June 18 – Ambrose Philips, librettist and poet (b. 1674)
- October 26 – Louis-Nicolas Clérambault, composer (born 1676)
- November 19 – Carl Heinrich Biber, composer (born 1681)
- November 27 – Gottfried Heinrich Stölzel, composer (born 1690)
- December 19 – Francesco Antonio Bonporti, priest and composer (born 1672)
- date unknown – Johann Ernst Galliard, composer (born 1687)
