= 1750 in music =

List of years in music	(table)
- … 1740; 1741; 1742; 1743; 1744; 1745; 1746; 1747; 1748; 1749; 1750; 1751; 1752; 1753; 1754; 1755; 1756; 1757; 1758; 1759; 1760 …
- Art; Archaeology; Architecture; Literature; Music; Philosophy; Science; +...

== Events ==
- May 1 – George Frideric Handel begins the tradition of benefit performances of his oratorio Messiah at and for the Foundling Hospital in London.
- Farinelli is knighted by King Ferdinand VI of Spain.
- Ten-year-old Carl Ditters von Dittersdorf begins playing with the Viennese Schottenkirche orchestra.
- Bach dictates Chorale preludes BWV 666 and 667 to pupil and son-in-law Johann Christoph Altnickol. These are then added to the manuscript of the Great Eighteen Chorale Preludes (BWV 668 is added posthumously).

== Classical music ==
- 1750 is commonly used to mark the end of the Baroque period
- CPE Bach
  - Cello Concerto in A minor, H.432
  - Harpsichord Concerto in D major, H.433
- Nicolas Chedeville – Les impromptus de Fontainebleau, Op.12
- Francesco Durante – Litania della Beata Maria Vergine in fa minore, a 4 voci
- George Frederic Handel – Theodora, HWV 68 (Oratorio, premiered Mar. 16 in London)
- Niccolo Jommelli – Laudate pueri Dominum
- Leopold Mozart – Partita for Violin, Cello and Double Bass ("Frog")
- Niccolò Pasquali – XII English songs in score. Collected from several masques and other entertainments... (London)
- Approximate date
  - Willem de Fesch – 6 Cello Sonatas, Op.13
  - Joseph Haydn – Divertimento in A major, Hob.XVI:5
  - Franz Xaver Richter
    - Symphony in D major, VB 52
    - Symphony in B-flat major, VB 59
  - Filippo Rosa – Recorder Sonata in F major

== Opera ==
- Johann Friedrich Agricola – Il filosofo convinto in amore
- William Boyce – The Roman Father
- Baldassare Galuppi – Il mondo alla roversa, premiered 14 November in Venice
- Johann Adolph Hasse – Attilio Regolo, premiered 12 January in Dresden
- Niccolò Jommelli – L'uccellatrice, premiered 6 May at the Teatro San Samuele in Venice

== Births ==
- January 25 – Johann Gottfried Vierling, German organist and composer (died 1813)
- March 23 – Johannes Matthias Sperger, Austrian contrabassist and composer (died 1812)
- August 18 – Antonio Salieri, Italian-born composer (died 1825)
- November – Anton Stamitz, German composer (died c.1805)
- December 3
  - Johann Martin Miller, hymnist and lyricist (died 1814)
  - Johann Franz Xaver Sterkel, composer and pianist (died 1817)
- date unknown
  - Benoît-Joseph Marsollier des Vivetières, librettist (died 1817)
  - Mikhail Matinsky, Russian mathematician, librettist and opera composer (died c. 1820)
  - Jean Balthasar Tricklir, cellist and composer (died 1813)
- probable – Antonio Rosetti, born Franz Anton Rösler, Bohemian-born composer (died 1792)

== Deaths ==
- January 4 – Christoph Schütz, German music publisher (born 1689)
- January 29 – Sophia Schröder, Swedish soprano at the Kungliga Hovkapellet (born 1712)
- February 22 – Pietro Filippo Scarlatti, Italian organist, choirmaster and composer (born 1679)
- March 6 – Domenico Montagnana, Italian luthier (born 1686)
- June 2 – Valentin Rathgeber, German composer (born 1682)
- June 14 – Franz Anton Maichelbeck, composer (born 1702)
- July 28 – Johann Sebastian Bach, German composer (born 1685)
- August – John Tufts, American music teacher (born 1689)
- September 4 – José de Cañizares, librettist (born 1676)
- September 15 – Charles Theodore Pachelbel, German-born organist, harpsichordist and composer (born 1690)
- September 28 – Johann Sigismund Scholze, music anthologist (born 1705)
- October 3 – Georg Matthias Monn, Austrian composer (born 1717)
- October 16 – Sylvius Leopold Weiss, German lutenist and composer (born 1687)
- November – Giuseppe Sammartini, Italian-born oboist and composer (born 1695)
- November 11 – Apostolo Zeno, librettist (born 1668)
- November 15 – Pantaleon Hebenstreit, German dance teacher, musician, composer and inventor of the pantalon (born 1668)
- November 25 – Francesco Feroci, composer (born 1673)
- date unknown – Francesco Goffriller, Italian violin maker (born 1692)
