= 1812 in music =

This is a list of music-related events in 1812.

== Events ==
- January 17 – Carl Maria von Weber leaves Leipzig for Gotha.
- February 11 – Carl Czerny gives the first Vienna performance of Beethoven's "Emperor" concerto.
- February 18 – Carl Maria von Weber performs in Dresden but is not a success.
- February 20 – Weber and his friend, clarinettist Heinrich Baermann, stay overnight in Berlin with the family of Baermann's former teacher Joseph Beer (father of Giacomo Meyerbeer).
- March 8 – Composer Georg Joseph Vogler and his pupil Jacob Beer, the future Meyerbeer, leave Darmstadt for Munich.
- May – The Royal Swedish Opera reopens after a 5-year gap.
- May 26 – Luigi Cherubini resigns from his position at the Académie Impériale de Musique.
- June 17 – Vogler and his pupil Beer are presented to the Queen of Bavaria at Nymphenburg.
- July 2 – Ludwig van Beethoven visits his patron Prince Kinsky, seeking an advance on his promised remuneration.
- July 26 – Fifteen-year-old Franz Schubert makes his last appearance as a chorister at the Imperial Chapel in Vienna.
- September 11 – Johann Nepomuk Hummel's ballet Sappho von Mitilene receives its première at Vienna.
- October 5 – Ludwig van Beethoven comes to Linz to try to stop his brother Johann's affair with Therese Obermayer.
- November 9 – Johann van Beethoven marries Therese Obermayer.
- December 31 – Giacomo Meyerbeer becomes the toast of Munich after performing at a concert for the benefit of wounded Bavarian soldiers.
- Date unknown – Irish composer John Field invents the Nocturne, redefining the form as a short, flowing piano composition written most often in compound duple meter. He writes his first three, out of eighteen, during this year.
- A performance of George Frideric Handel's oratorio Alexander's Feast (Timotheus) is given in the Spanish Riding School of the Hofburg in Vienna, leading to the founding of the Gesellschaft der Musikfreunde by Joseph Sonnleithner.

== Classical music ==
- Ludwig van Beethoven
  - Symphony no. 7 (Opus 92) (finished, began 1811)
  - Symphony no. 8 (Opus 93)
  - Violin Sonata No. 10
  - 3 Equali, WoO 30
  - Allegretto, WoO 39
  - 12 Irish Songs, WoO 154
- William Crotch – Palestine (oratorio)
- Jan Ladislav Dussek – Two Duos for piano and harp
- Mauro Giuliani
  - Studio per la Chitarra, Op. 1
  - Rondoletto, Op. 4
  - Grand Potpourri No.3, Op. 31
  - 24 Etudes, Op. 48
  - Grand Potpourri for Flute and Guitar, Op. 53
- Karol Kurpinski – Bitwa pod Możajskiem, Op. 15
- Giovanni Paisiello – Mass in C
- Ferdinand Ries
  - Piano Concerto No.3, Op. 55
  - 3 Airs russes variés, Op. 72
- Antonio Salieri – Kyrie in C
- James Sanderson – "Hail to the Chief"
- Franz Schubert
  - Overture in D major, D.12
  - Fugue in D minor, D.13
  - Der Geistertanz, D.15a
  - String Quartet No.1, D.18
  - Overture in D major, D.26
  - Piano Trio in B-flat major, D.28
  - Andante in C major, D. 29
  - Der Jüngling am Bache, D.30
  - String Quartet No. 2 in C major, D. 32
  - Serbate, o Dei custodi, D.35
  - String Quartet No.3, D.36
  - Die Advokaten, D.37
  - Klaglied
- Carl Maria von Weber
  - 6 Favorit-Walzer der Kaiserin von Frankreich Marie Louise, J.143–148
  - Piano Sonata No.1 in C major, Op. 24

== Opera ==
- François-Adrien Boieldieu – Jean de Paris
- Giacomo Meyerbeer – Jephtas Gelübde (Hoftheater, Munich, 23 November)
- Gioachino Rossini
  - Aureliano in Palmira (composition began)
  - Ciro in Babilonia
  - Demetrio e Polibio
  - L'inganno felice (Teatro San Moisè, Venice, 8 January).
  - L'occasione fa il ladro (intermezzo; Premiered November 24)
  - La pietra del paragone
  - La scala di seta
- Franz Schubert – Der Spiegelritter (incomplete)

== Births ==
- January 8 – Vasily Botkin, translator and critic (died 1869)
- January 14 – Karl Graedener, composer (d. 1883)
- January 21 – Eduard Tauwitz, composer (d. 1894)
- February 6 – Berthold Damcke, German composer (died 1875)
- February 7 – Charles Dickens, writer and lyricist (died 1870)
- February 19 – Zygmunt Krasiński, lyricist and bard (died 1859)
- March 3 – Alexandre Dubuque, Russian composer (died 1898)
- March 11 – William Vincent Wallace, composer (d. 1865)
- April 20 – Pauline Åhman, harpist (d. 1904)
- April 27 – Friedrich von Flotow, composer (d. 1883)
- May 4 – Amalia Redec, pianist and composer (d. 1885)
- May 7 – Robert Browning, lyricist and poet (died 1889)
- May 12 – Edward Lear, lyricist ("The Owl and the Pussycat") and artist (died 1888)
- May 14 – Emilie Mayer, composer (d. 1883)
- June 27 – John Pyke Hullah, composer and music teacher (d. 1884)
- July 28 – Józef Ignacy Kraszewski, lyricist and poet (died 1887)
- August 12 – John Oxenford, librettist and dramatist (died 1877)
- October 1 – Johann Rufinatscha, composer, music theorist and teacher (d. 1893)
- November 1 – Hermann von Gilm, lyricist and poet (died 1864)
- November 14 – Aleardo Aleardi, librettist and poet (died 1878)
- November 28 – Ludvig Mathias Lindeman, composer (d. 1887)
- December 6 – Gustave Vaëz, librettist and composer (died 1862)
- December 28 – Julius Rietz, German cellist, conductor and composer (died 1877)

== Deaths ==
- February 5 – Franz Schneider, composer and organist (born 1737)
- February 9 – Franz Anton Hoffmeister, composer and music publisher (born 1754)
- March 20 – Jan Ladislav Dussek, pianist and composer (born 1760)
- March 27 – Joachim Albertini, composer (born 1748)
- May 21 – Joseph Wölfl, pianist and composer (born 1773)
- June 15 – Anton Stadler, clarinet and basset horn player (born 1753)
- July 17 – John Broadwood, piano manufacturer (born 1732)
- July 24 – Joseph Schuster, composer (born 1748)
- August 19 – Vincenzo Righini, composer, singer and kapellmeister (born 1756)
- September 21 – Emanuel Schikaneder, German impresario, actor, singer and librettist (born 1751)
- December – Michel-Joseph Gebauer, instrumentalist, bandmaster and composer (born 1763)
- December 13 – Marianne von Martinez, singer, pianist and composer (born 1744)
- date unknown
  - Isaac Bickerstaffe, Irish librettist (born 1733)
  - Luciano Francisco Comella, librettist and playwright (born 1751)
  - Christian Benjamin Uber, amateur musician and composer (born 1746)
