= Violin Sonata No. 10 (Beethoven) =

Composition by Ludwig van Beethoven

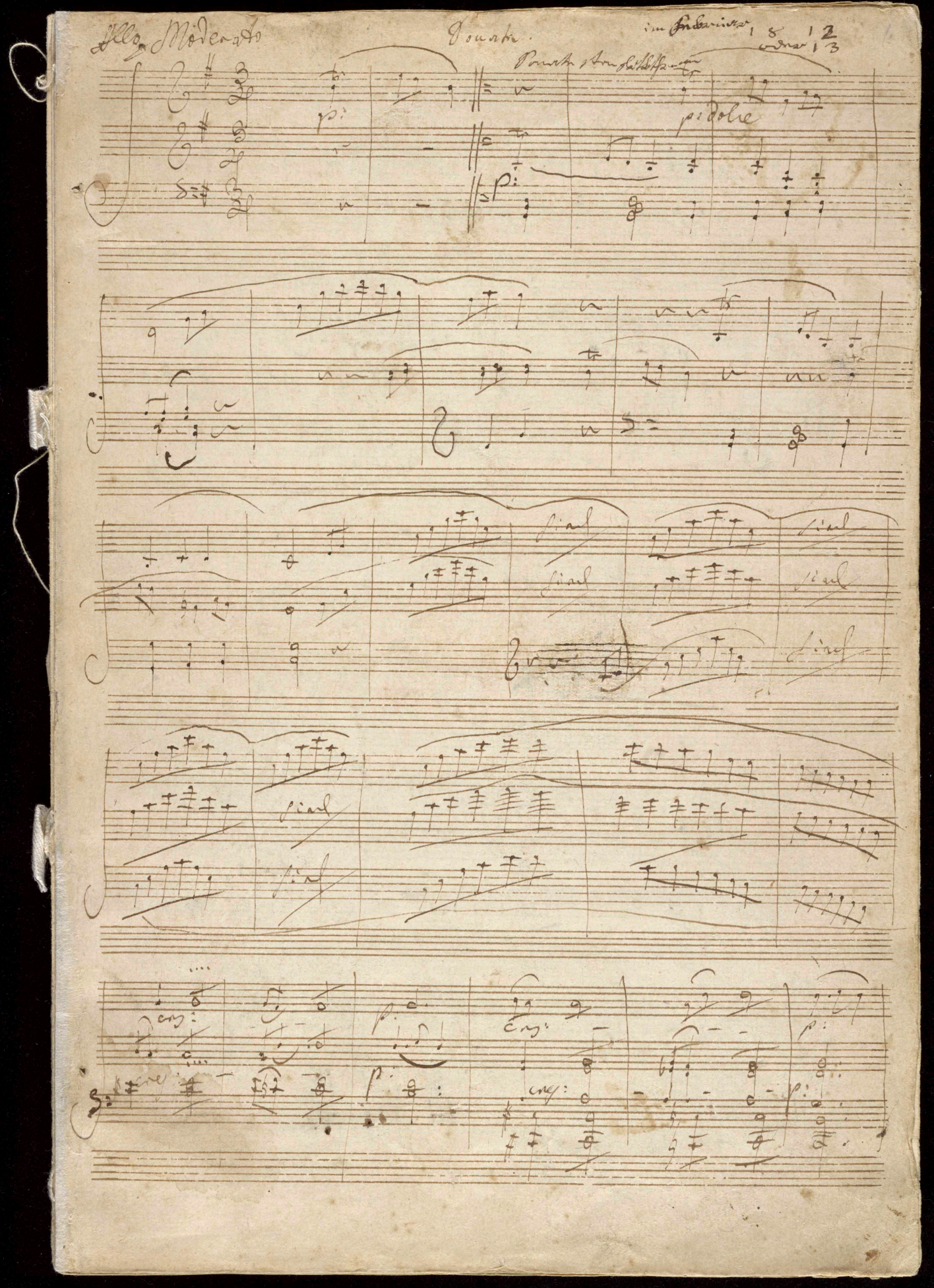
Beethoven's Manuscript, page 1

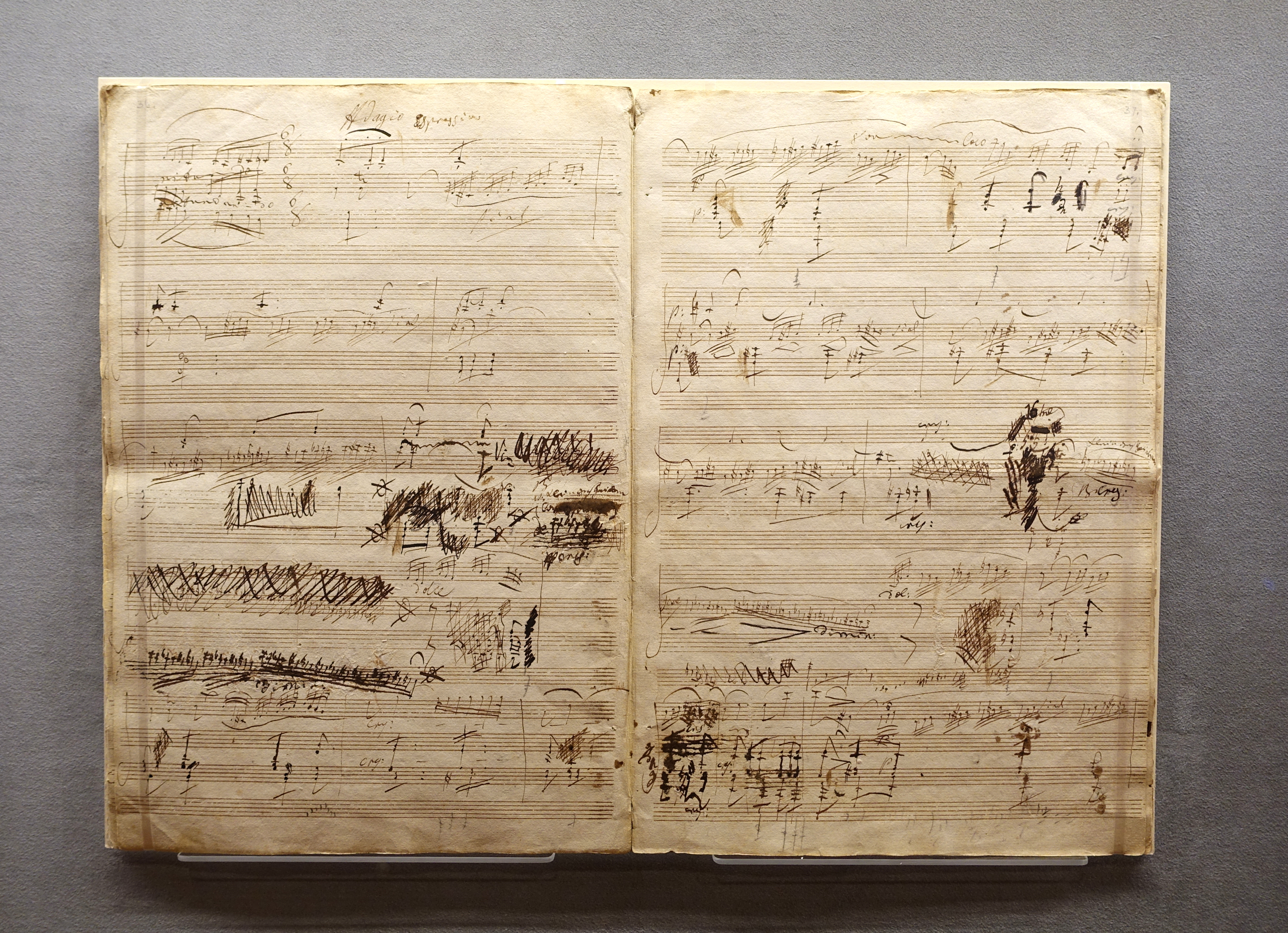
Violin Sonata No. 10, 1815, musical autograph

The Violin Sonata No. 10 in G major, Op. 96, by Ludwig van Beethoven was written in 1812, published in 1816, and dedicated to Beethoven's pupil Archduke Rudolph Johannes Joseph Rainier of Austria, who gave its first performance, together with the violinist Pierre Rode.

== Structure and analysis ==
It has four movements:

1. Allegro moderato (in G major)
2. Adagio espressivo (in E♭ major)
3. Scherzo: Allegro – Trio (in G minor, Trio in E♭ major, ends in G major)
4. Poco allegretto-adagio expressivo-allegro-poco adagio-presto (in G major-E flat major-G major-G minor-G major)

The final movement was written with Pierre Rode's style in mind. Shortly before completing the work, Beethoven wrote to the Archduke Rudolph “… I did not make great haste in the last movement for the sake of mere punctuality, the more because, in writing it, I had to consider the playing of Rode. In our finales we like rushing and resounding passages, but this does not please R and — this hinders me somewhat.” As a result, the finale was a set of seven variations and a short coda on a cheerful theme.

The work takes approximately 27 minutes to perform.

It is described as the loveliest of his violin sonatas, with "calm, ethereal beauty" and "a searching test for the players. Everything must be right, from the very first trill". The opening trill is an integral part of the subject.
