= 1741 in music =

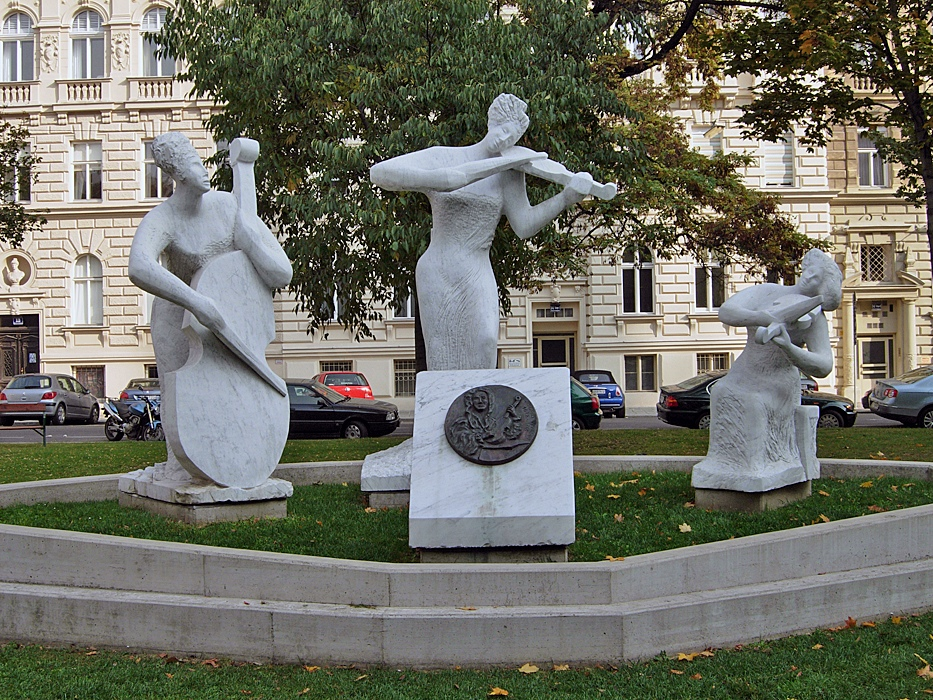
A monument to Vivaldi in Vienna, Austria

== Events ==
- August 22–September 14 – George Frideric Handel composes his oratorio Messiah in London to a libretto compiled by Charles Jennens, completing the "Hallelujah Chorus" on September 6.
- October 2 – The Bull's Head Musical Society opens a Music Hall in Fishamble Street, Dublin, Ireland.
- November 18 – George Frideric Handel arrives in Dublin to give a series of concerts having tried out the Messiah privately en route in Chester.
- November 25 – Marguerite-Antoinette Couperin, the first female court musician at the French court, sells her official post to Bernard de Bury.
- Johann Friedrich Agricola arrives in Berlin to study musical composition under Johann Joachim Quantz.
- Antonio Vivaldi leaves Venice for Vienna, but dies shortly after his arrival.
- 19-year-old Jiří Antonín Benda is given the post of second violinist at the Berlin court of King Frederick II of Prussia.
- William Hogarth produces an engraving entitled The Enraged Musician.

== Classical music ==
- Girolamo Abos – Magnificat à quarto concertato con strum.
- Carl Philipp Emanuel Bach
  - Harpsichord Concerto in A major, H.411
  - Symphony in G major, H.648
- Johann Sebastian Bach – Goldberg Variations, BWV 988
- Joseph Bodin de Boismortier – 6 Flute Sonatas, Op. 91
- Michel Corrette – Nouveau Livre de noëls
- Jean-Baptiste Dupuits – 6 Sonatas for Vielle and Harpsichord, Op. 3
- Willem de Fesch – 8 Concertos in 7 Parts, Op. 10
- Baldassare Galuppi – Confitebor tibi Domine in C major, B.II.2
- Christoph Graupner
  - Trio Sonata in E major, GWV 208
  - Flute Sonata in G major, GWV 708
- George Frideric Handel
  - Messiah composed.
  - Quel fior che all'alba ride, HWV 192 (duet)
  - Overture in D major, HWV 424
- Johann Adolph Hasse – 12 Flute Concertos, Op. 3
- Friedrich Wilhelm Marpurg – Pièces de Clavecin
- Jean-Philippe Rameau – Pieces de Clavecin en Concerts
- Georg Philipp Telemann – 24 Odes, TWV 25:86-109

== Opera ==
- Tomaso Albinoni – Artamene
- Andrea Bernasconi – Demofoonte
- Baldassare Galuppi – Penelope
- Christoph Willibald Gluck – Artaserse
- Karl Heinrich Graun – Rodelinda regina de' Longobardi, GraunWV B:I:6
- George Frideric Handel – Deidamia, HWV 42 (composed 1740)
- Johann Adolph Hasse – Numa Pompilio
- Niccolò Jommelli – Semiramide riconosciuta
- Giovanni Battista Lampugnani – Arsace

== Publications ==
- Johann Sebastian Bach – Clavier-Übung IV (Nuremberg: Balthasar Schmid), now known as the Goldberg Variations.
- The Cocquiel Manuscript, B-Br Ms II 3326 Mus, containing sacred music by various composers (including Jacob La Fosse and Abraham van den Kerckhoven)

== Methods and theory writings ==
- Michel Corrette – Méthode pour apprendre le violoncelle, Op. 24
- Antoine Terrasson – Historique sur la vielle
- Carlo Tessarini – Gramatica di musica

== Births ==
- February 8 – André Grétry, composer (died 1813)
- February 9
  - Joseph Corfe (died 1820)
  - Henri-Joseph Rigel, composer (died 1799)
- April 17 – Johann Gottlieb Naumann (died 1801)
- May 23 – Andrea Luchesi, composer (died 1801)
- July 17 – Suzette Defoye, opera singer and ballerina
- July 27 – François-Hippolyte Barthélémon, violinist and composer (died 1808)
- August 31 – Jean-Paul-Égide Martini, composer (died 1816)
- September 11 – Johann Jakob Engel (died 1802)
- September 25 – Václav Pichl, singer, violinist and composer (died 1805)
- November 27 – Jean-Pierre Duport (died 1818)
- date unknown
  - Franz Xaver Hammer, gambist, cellist and composer (died 1817)
  - Giacomo Rust (died 1786)
  - Anna Brita Wendelius, singer and member of the Swedish Royal Academy of Music (died 1804).

== Deaths ==
- January 5 – Ann Turner Robinson, English soprano
- February 13 – Johann Fux, composer and theorist (born 1660)
- March 17 – Jean-Baptiste Rousseau (born 1671)
- June 21 – Joseph-Hector Fiocco, Flemish violinist and composer (born 1703)
- July 28 – Antonio Vivaldi, composer (born 1678)
- August – David Owen, Welsh harpist (born 1712)
- August 24 – Gabriel-Vincent Thévenard, French operatic baritone (born 1669)
- September 3 (or after) – Carlo Francesco Cesarini (born 1666)
- September 7 – Henri Desmarets, French composer of sacred music (born 1661)
- probable – Francesco Scarlatti, composer (born 1666)
