= Herman Sätherberg =

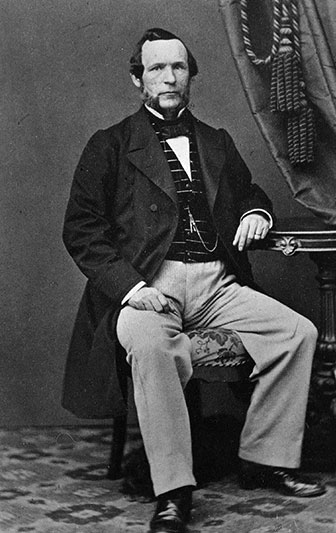
Herman Sätherberg

Karl or Carl Herman Sätherberg (May 19, 1812 – January 9, 1897) was a Swedish poet and orthopedic physician.

Sätherberg was born in Botkyrka socken. He became a medical doctor in 1843 and travelled with the corvette Karlskrona to the Mediterranean 1844–1845. In 1847, he succeeded Nils Åkerman as director of the Orthopedic Institute in Stockholm, where he remained until 1879. Sätherberg was very active in the development of physical therapy in Sweden.

The theme that he was most known for in his poetry was nature, but he also wrote plays and epic poems. His poem Blomsterkonungen, a homage to Carl von Linné, was widely read. He also wrote lyrics for the son of king Oscar I and composer Gustav. He wrote the lyrics for the popular song Studentsången.

He died in Stockholm.
