= Treaty of Saint Petersburg (1812) =

1812 treaty between Sweden and Russia

The Treaty of Saint Petersburg was signed in Saint Petersburg on April 5, 1812, between Sweden and the Russian Empire. The treaty established an alliance between Russia and Sweden against the French Empire of Napoleon. The alliance was invoked during the War of the Sixth Coalition.

== See also ==
- Napoleonic Wars
