= 1740 in music =

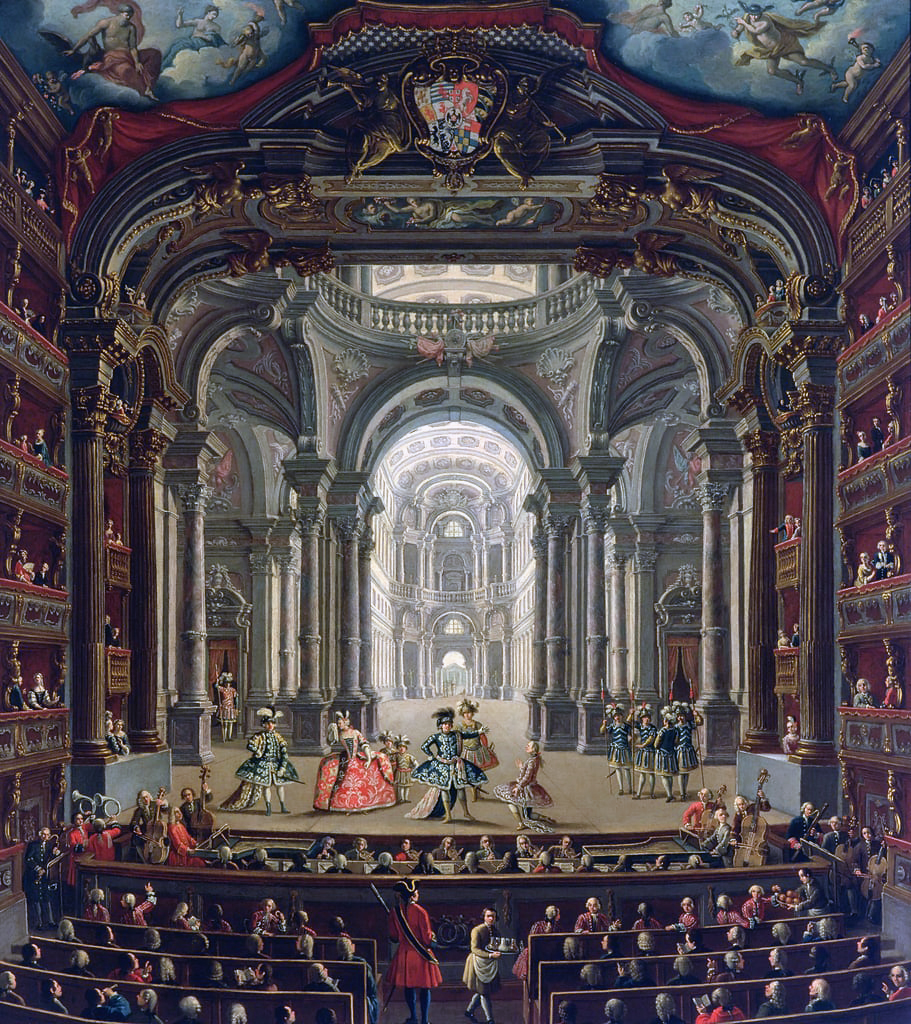

== Events ==
- Johann Sebastian Bach begins to lose his sight.
- Carl Heinrich Graun becomes Kapellmeister to Frederick II of Prussia. Johann Joachim Quantz becomes Frederick's flute teacher.
- Ferdinando Bertoni arrives in Bologna where he becomes a pupil of Giovanni Battista Martini.
- December 26 – The Teatro Regio (Turin) is inaugurated with a performance of Francesco Feo's opera Arsace.

== Classical music ==
- Thomas Arne – Alfred (masque), including the song, "Rule Britannia"
- Carl Philipp Emanuel Bach
  - Concerto for 2 Harpsichords in F major, H.408
  - Harpsichord Concerto in A major, H.410
  - Flute Sonata in A minor, H.555
- Christoph Graupner – Violin Sonata in G minor, GWV 711
- George Frideric Handel – L'Allegro, il Penseroso ed il Moderato, HWV 55
- Giuseppe Tartini – Violin Concerto in C major, D.1
- Georg Philipp Telemann – 6 Overtures for Clavier, TWV 32:5–10 (Published ca. 1742 in Nuremberg, as VI Ouverturen nebst zween Folgesätzen)

== Opera ==
- Bernardo Aliprandi – Semiramide riconosciuta
- Vincenzo Legrenzio Ciampi – La Beatrice
- Baldassare Galuppi – Gustavo primo re di Svezia
- Maurice Greene – The Judgement of Hercules
- George Frideric Handel – Imeneo, HWV 41 (first performed, composed in 1738)
- Nicola Porpora – Il trionfo di Camilla
- Luca Antonio Predieri – Zenobia

== Publications ==
- Thomas Arne – Comus (London: William Smith). First performed 1738.
- Jean-Baptiste Barrière – 6 Cello Sonatas, Livre 4 (Paris: Composer) (Likely composed 1737–1740)
- Michel Blavet – 6 Flute Sonatas, Op. 3
- Louis de Caix d'Hervelois – Pièces de viole, Livre 4
- Esprit Philippe Chédeville – 6 Sonatilles galantes, Op. 6
- Nicolas Chédeville – Les Deffis ou l'étude amusante, Op. 9
- Antoine Dauvergne
  - 6 Trio Sonatas, Op. 1
  - 12 Violin Sonatas, Op. 2
- Michel Richard Delalande – Noëls en Trio avec un Carillon, S.173.24 (composed 1725, published posthumously)
- George Frideric Handel
  - Op. 6, 12 Concerti Grossi
  - "A Second Set of Six Concertos" (London: John Walsh) (arranged for organ, No. 3–6 are also in Op. 6)
- James Oswald – A Curious Collection of Scots Tunes
- Johan Helmich Roman – Assaggio in G minor, BeRI 314 (Stockholm: Composer) likely composed earlier.
- Carlo Tessarini – 6 Allettamenti da camera, Op. 3 (there is another Op. 3 by Tessarini, a set of 10 violin concerti)
- Antonio Vivaldi – 6 Cello Sonatas, Le Clerc Op. 14 (Paris: Le Clerc le Cadet)
- Unico Wilhelm van Wassenaer – Concerti Armonici (composed between 1725–1740, originally published anonymously and attributed to various composers)

== Methods and theory writings ==
- Michel Corrette – Méthode pour apprendre à jouër la flûtte
- John Frederick Lampe – The Art of Musick
- Johann Mattheson – Grundlage einer Ehren-Pforte

== Births ==
- February 3 – Guillaume Lasceux (died 1831)
- February 4 – Carl Michael Bellman, poet and composer (died 1795)
- February 15 – Ernst Eichner (died 1777)
- May 9 – Giovanni Paisiello, composer (died 1816)
- July 26 – Louis-Augustin Richer, classical singer, singing master and composer (died 1819)
- August 10 – Samuel Arnold (composer), (died 1802)
- October 7 – Samuel Webbe (died 1816)
- November 4 – Augustus Montague Toplady, hymn-writer (died 1778)
- December – Elisabeth Olin, operatic soprano (died 1828)
- unknown date
  - John Antes, composer (died 1811)
  - Sir Peter Beckford, English peer (died 1811), patron of Muzio Clementi
  - Samuel Webbe, composer (died 1816)
- probable – Anna Bon, singer and composer

== Deaths ==
- January 5 – Antonio Lotti, composer (born 1667)
- January 13 – William Turner, singer and composer (born 1651)
- January 25 – Geminiano Giacomelli, composer (born 1692)
- February 9 – Vincent Lübeck, organist and composer (born 1654)
- February 25 – Dietrich Bernhard Ludewig (born 1707)
- October 14 – Domenico Alberti, composer (born c.1710)
- unknown date
  - André Bouys, painter and copyist (born c.1656)
  - Edward Purcell, organist (born 1689)
  - Poul Christian Schindler, composer (born 1648)
- probable – François Dieupart, French composer (born after 1667)
