= Suzette Defoye =

French actor and dancer

Suzette Defoye née Marie-Suzanne-Joséphe Artus Truyart (Lille, 17 July 1741 – Floruit 1787), was a French ballet dancer, stage actress, opera singer and theatre director, active in France, Belgium and Russia.

== Biography ==
Suzette Artus was born the child of the musician Pierre-Jérôme Artus Truyart and the actress Marie Bienfait. She debuted as a dancer the Desgraviers troupe in Metz in the 1759–60 season before her debut as first singer in Brussels in 1766 as Zerbine in Baurans and Pergolesi's La Servante maîtresse.

On 30 June 1766 she was one of fifteen actors granted exclusive right by Empress Maria Theresa of Austria to perform in Brussels, known as the Ordinary Actors to H.R.H. Prince Charles of Lorraine, governor of the Austrian Netherlands. The troupe was an artistic success but not economically successful. When Suzette, against her the will of her colleagues, wanted to resign as co-director in 1768, a conflict broke out, which was not solved until two co-directors granted her an annuity in 1772.

In 1773, she left Brussels. She joined the troupe of Mme Destouches-Lobreau in Lyon the 1773–74 season, and then left for Russia, where she performed in the imperial troupe in Saint Petersburg and Moscow. When the French troupe left Russia in 1779, she stayed, and performed at several concerts of church music for Lent organized by the violinist Louis-Henri Paisible. In 1781, she returned to France, where she performed in Lille, and then to the Austrian Netherlands, where she performed in the theatre of Ghent in 1782–85 and then in Liège.

In 1787, she was the director of the theatre of Béthune, and the Baron d'Hinge, the Grand Bailiff of Béthune, requested that she be granted the exclusive right to perform in Amiens. Her life after this date is unknown.

=== Family ===
She married the bassoonist François-René-Marie Defoye before 1766, but on November 19, 1771, she had her husband interned at the Alexian monastery in Brussels, for "a clear case of madness", where he remained until his death in 1800. She moved in with her lover Nicolas Guilleminot-Dugué, an actor who had arrived in Brussels in 1769 and a member of the troupe since 1771; their relationship lasted until 1779.
