= Maria Zubova =

Russian poet, composer, singer (c. 1749–1799)

Maria Voinovna Zubova Мария Воиновна Зубова
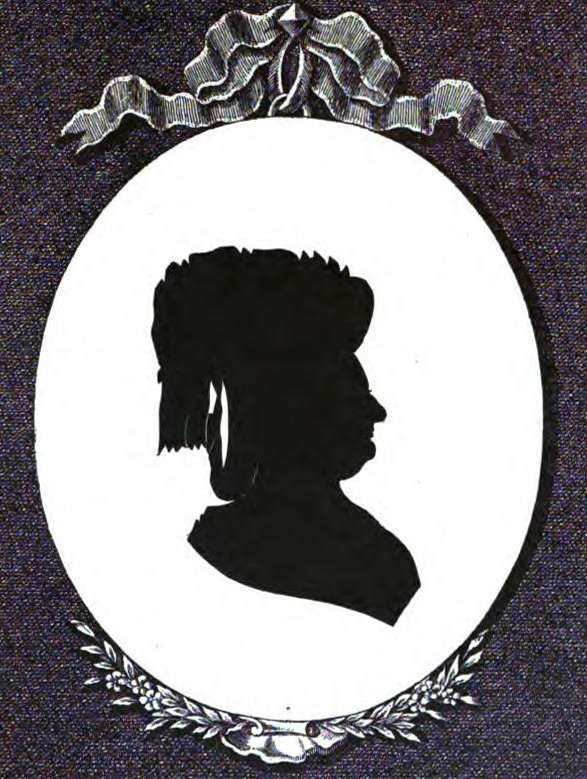

Background information
- Born: Mariva Voinovna Rimsky-Korsakov c. 1749 ?
- Origin: St.Petersburg, Russia
- Died: 1799 (aged 49–50)
- Occupations: Composer, singer

Maria Voinovna Zubova (Russian: Мария Воиновна Зубова), (1749?–1799) was a Russian poet, composer, and concert singer, known for her rendition of folksongs.

She was born in Saint Petersburg and was the daughter of Vice-Admiral Warrior Yakovlevich Rimsky-Korsakov. She was married to Afanasy Nikolaevich Zubov (1738–1822), Governor of Kursk from 1782 to 1791. With her husband, on June 19, 1780, they moved into an estate located near Murom, Vladimir Oblast, regarded as one of the most ancient cities within Russia.

== Composer ==
Zubova was the creator of heartfelt poems and a composer of salon songs during the late 18th and was considered by the Russian Writer Daniil Mordovtsev as one of the "literary daughters of Lomonosov and Sumarokov."

Only a small portion of her musical work was published, the majority being published in Saint Petersburg during 1770. She was also a minor translator of French literature, although her work remains unpublished. She is most recognized for her folksong "I am moving to the desert..." written in 1791, whose words are now commonly used within the Russian vernacular. The second line of the first stanza is used, e.g., "From the beautiful places here," to denote a cynically tongue-in-cheek attitude of fake nostalgic sadness at one's departure from a less-than-satisfactory place of dwelling. Hence, they prefer the heat of the desert over the inferior conditions of the present. The date attributed to the song is disputed, as many of her songs were printed 10 years earlier in an anthology published by the duo M. D Chulkov and N. I Novikov. The song is present within several different anthologies, the most recent being the Soviet collection of songs called "Monuments of Russian Musical Art" as collected by the Soviet Musicologist Yuri V. Keldysh in 1979. It was presented by Keldysh in the Classical style, unadorned and with no given bass accompaniment, only figured bass.

Zubova's songs featured her own poetic verse and was heavily influenced by pre-Revolutionary expansionism as a result of Peter's 1st Petrian reforms and further intellectual cultivations under Catherine The Great during the Russian Enlightenment. Because she was mostly active during the latter half of the 18th-century, themes used in her romances and folksongs dealt with expressing the naturality of life and the realistic experiences of the folk people, all the while maintaining sophisticated objectivity. Because of this, she won much support from Russian society and her career was immensely fruitful throughout Russia's societal hierarchy.

Mordovtsev notes that Zubova's songs were "the first" compositions that were emotionally able to be sung due to Russia's demoralized and socioculturally bruised position as a result of the mid/late 17th century Raskol movement, a religious Schism led by Patriarch Nikon to centralize the Russian Orthodox faith and its practices, as well as consolidate the chain of command, leading to widespread persecution against the "Old Believers."

"These were the first songs which Russia allowed itself to sing along with the songs of Sumarokov and his daughters after the Schism: poems, spiritual cantatas ... and folk songs of a ritual or everyday cycle"

— Daniil Mordovtsev

== Performance career ==
Along with her compositional career, she was widely known for being a highly skilled folk-song performer, often performing at parties and salons to high praise. The Russian folklorist Mikhail Nikolaevich Makarov (1785–1847) said she was, "the best singer in the early reign of Catherine II." Her musical talent was steeped in the Italian style and participated in the 18th-century convention of ornamentation and melodic improvisation while performing, as per the custom during the Baroque period. This style was known as "figured singing," with the focus on dexterous movement and emotional fervanices all the while retaining a cool demeanor and composed vibrancy a quintessentiality of Zubova's singing style.

== Personality and death ==
Natalia Kirillovna Zagryazhskaya (1747–1837), a lady in waiting to Catherine II and close acquaintance of Pushkin, called Zubova "an intelligent and amiable woman", akin to the behavioral style of "Monsieur Morte," the Marquise de Merteuil and hero of the novel Les Liaisons dangereuses by Choderlos de Laclos.

On October 9, 1799, Count Fyodor Vasilievich Rostopchin (1763–1826) and Count Semyon Vorontsov (1744–1832) notified Zubova's relatives that she had suddenly died following a stroke during a card game with friends.

== Compositions ==
=== Songs ===
- 1791: I am moving away from the beautiful local places into the desert, for piano and voice

=== Anthologies ===
- 1770: Collection of Various Songs (Собрание разных песен:(Second version,1788), by M. D Chulkov and N. I Novikov
- 1827: Newest Selected Songbook
- 1979: Monuments of Russian musical art. Issue 1: Russian vocal lyrics of the 18th century, curated and published by Yuri. V. Keldysh

=== Cantatas ===
- [They are said to have existed, but no more detail is provided]

=== Poem ===
- According to Amanda Ewington, "Zubova's present obscurity belies the intense popularity once enjoyed by her poem 'I am Leaving for the Wilds.' This poem long attributed to Zubova, was a staple in Russian culture among all social classes."

== Recordings ==
1. I am banished to the Desert: Ensemble Talisman, Oleg Timofeyev (Guitar), Anne Harley (Soprano) Dorian Recordings, Music of Russian Princesses (2013)
2. I am retiring to the Desert: M. Zhilkin (soprano), E. Mityushkina (mezzo-soprano), I. Malyshev (piano)
