= Anton Wilhelm Solnitz =

German Bohemian composer

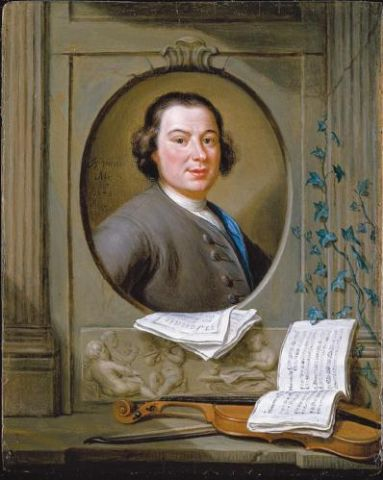
Anton Wilhelm Solnitz

Anton Wilhelm Solnitz (or Sollnitz, c. 1708–1752) was a German Bohemian composer.

Like his compatriot Johann Andreas Kauchlitz (a few decades later), his entire musically significant life was in the rich Dutch Republic, which attracted musicians from various European countries, even the great Italian Pietro Antonio Locatelli. He died in Leiden, a Dutch university city. An allegorical portrait of the composer by Herman van der Mijn from 1743, in oil on panel, (sized 7.4 x 5.9 inch (18.8 x 15 cm.), was sold from the Old Master Paintings collection of Lillemor Herweg in 2005.

== Works ==
His Sinfonia in A for strings and continuo opus 3 no. 4 and a Sinfonia in g-Moll for strings and continuo are preserved and still performed.
