= 1743 in music =

== Events ==
- March 23 – English premiere of Handel's Messiah before royalty at the Theatre Royal, Covent Garden in London.
- Johann Sebastian Bach examines the organ at the Johanniskirche, Leipzig.
- 1743–1746 Bach revises his St Matthew Passion (two organs used again, but viola da gamba still retained; recitatives revised so that now only the vox Christi recitatives have sustained continuo parts). No evidence of version being performed (version we know today).

== Classical music ==
- Carl Philipp Emanuel Bach – Keyboard Sonata in B minor, H.32.5
- William Boyce – Solomon (serenata)
- Maurice Greene – "Thou visitest the earth" (Song)
- George Frideric Handel
  - Samson (oratorio, composed 1741–42, premiered 18 February 1732 at Covent Garden in London)
  - Semele, HWV 58 (oratorio, composed 3 June to 4 July, not performed until 1744)
  - Joseph and His Brethren, HWV 59
  - Te Deum in D major, HWV 283
  - Organ Concerto in A major, HWV 307
- Niccolò Jommelli – La Betulia liberata (sacred oratorio)
- Johann Ludwig Krebs – 6 Trios, Krebs-WV 317–322
- James Oswald – Colin's Kisses, a set of 12 songs.
- Giuseppe Tartini – 12 Violin Sonatas, published in Rome in 1745 as Op. 2 and in Paris, ca. 1747 as Op. 3 (at least two other publications are known as Op. 2, including the 6 Violin Sonatas published in Amsterdam in this year, but there are no other collections published as Op. 3)
- Valentin Rathgeber – Pastorellen für die Weihnachtszeit, R 322

== Opera ==
- Joseph Bodin de Boismortier – Don Quichotte chez la duchesse, Op.97
- Bernard de Bury – Les Caractères de la folie
- Baldassare Galuppi – Enrico
- Christoph Willibald Gluck – Demofoonte, Wq.3
- Carl Heinrich Graun – Artaserse
- Johann Adolph Hasse – Antigono
- Niccolò Jommelli – Demofoonte
- Domingo Terradellas – Merope

== Publications ==
- Francesco Geminiani – Pièces de clavecin tirées des differens ouvrages de Mr F. Geminiani adaptées par luy même (arrangements, mostly from Opp. 1 and 4)
- Maurice Greene – 40 Select Anthems in Score
- Louis-Gabriel Guillemain – 6 Sonates en quatuors, ou conversations galantes, for flute, violin, viola da gamba, and basso continuo, Op. 12 (Paris)
- Jean-Marie Leclair – Quatrième livre de sonates, for violin (two alternatively for flute) and basso continuo, Op. 9 (Paris)
- Giovanni Benedetto Platti – 6 Flute Sonatas, Op. 3 (Nuremberg)
- Giuseppe Sammartini – 12 Trio Sonatas, Op. 3 (Paris)
- Giuseppe Tartini – VI Sonate, for violin and basso continuo, Op. 2 (Amsterdam) (two other collections were published as Op. 2, VI concerti a 8 in Amsterdam, 1734, and 12 Sonatas for violin and basso continuo in Rome, 1745, but also in Paris, ca. 1747 as Op. 3)

== Births ==
- February 19 – Luigi Boccherini, composer (died 1805)
- May 17 – Christoph Bernhard Verspoell, composer and priest (died 1818)
- May 21 – François Duval, dancer
- July 6 – Valentin Adamberger, operatic tenor (died 1804)
- July 14 – Gavrila Derzhavin, poet (died 1816)
- September 30 – Christian Ehregott Weinlig, cantor and composer (died 1813)
- October 5 – Giuseppe Gazzaniga, composer (died 1818)
- October 10 – Marie-Madeleine Guimard, ballerina (died 1816)
- November 18 – Johannes Ewald, librettist and dramatist (died 1781)
- December 7 – Johann Joachim Eschenburg, translator (died 1820)
- Date unknown
  - Charles-Georges Boyer, music publisher (died c. 1806)
  - George Saville Carey, librettist and entertainer (died 1807)

== Deaths ==
- February 1 – Giuseppe Ottavio Pitoni (born 1657)
- February 6 – Toussaint Bertin de la Doué, composer (born 1680)
- February 7 – Lodovico Giustini, composer (born 1685)
- March 9 – Jean-Baptiste de Lully, son of Jean-Baptiste Lully (born 1665)
- March 16 – Jean-Baptiste Matho, composer (born 1663)
- April 20 – Alexandre-François Desportes, copyist and painter (born 1661)
- July 12 – Johann Bernhard Bach (the younger), organist and composer (born 1700)
- August 13 – Johann Elias Schlegel, librettist and poet (born 1719)
- September 14 – Georg von Bertouch, composer (born 1668)
- October 5 – Henry Carey, poet, dramatist, songwriter and theatrical composer, suicide (born 1687)
