= Amalia Redec =

Swedish pianist and composer

Amalia Redec (4 May 1812 – 21 November 1885), was a Swedish pianist and composer. She was a concert pianist and a piano teacher and she produced compositions for piano music in the style of the Romanticism of the 1850s.

== Life ==
She was born to the businessman Eric Esaias Setterborg and Helena Charlotta Bronander and married in 1834 to the businessman Johan Peter Redec (d. 1850). Her spouse went bankrupt, and as a widow, she settled in Gothenburg, where she worked as a piano teacher at the Societetsskolan and the girls' school Matilda Halls skola. She is also known to have performed in public piano concerts.

Her music was, for the most part, easily accessible music intended for entertaining in the home and for amateurs, in a time period were every lady above the working class was expected to be able to entertain with piano music at home. While she was forgotten in the 20th century, she was evidently a well-known composer and a household name in Sweden in her own lifetime, and she was included in the collection of well-known composers, Det sjungande Sverige – 100 kända och omtyckta sånger ('literary: Singing Sweden - 100 well known and popular songs') published in 1874.

== Works ==
- Sånger vid piano-forte. H. 4 af Amalia Redec, Götheborg: På eget förlag, 1853
- Dansportfölj : för piano-forte. H. 1 af Amalia Redec, Götheborg : N. J. Gumperts Förlag, unknown year
- Sex sånger vid piano forte af Amalia Redec, Förlag: Stockholm : J. C. Hedbom, 1840s
