= Avdotya Mikhaylova =

Russian opera singer

M. Awdotja Mikhailova (1746–1807), was a Russian stage actress and opera singer. She belonged to the pioneer group of first professional actors in Russia, and could be regarded as the first opera singer in Russia. She also performed folk songs.
