= Daniel Pio Dal Barba =

Italian composer, violinist, singer and poet

Daniel Pio Dal Barba (May 5, 1715 in Verona — July 26, 1801, also in Verona) was an Italian composer, violinist, singer and poet. Daniel Barba was the fourth child of an innkeeper and achieved local fame in the Veneto area. In 1744, his opera Il Tigrane was premiered with some success, and for several years following he performed on stage as a tenor.

== Selected recordings ==
- Messa da Morto breve (Requiem), Coro Istituzione Armonica, Ensemble Il Narvalo, Alberto Turco 2022
- Violin Sonatas - Valerio Losito, Federico Del Sordo, Diego Leverić, Cecilia Medi, Andrea Lattarulo, Carlo Calegari. Erscheinungsdatum: 28. 12. 2022
