= Narciso Casanovas =

Spanish composer (1747–1799)

Narcís Casanoves or Narciso Casanovas (1747–1799) was a Spanish composer who became a Benedictine monk in 1763 at Montserrat, where he remained for the rest of his life. As well as sacred music, he wrote single-movement sonatas for the keyboard.
