= Franz Xaver Hammer =

German gambist, cellist and composer

Franz Xaver Hammer called Marteau (1741 – 11 October 1817) was a German gambist, cellist and composer.

Hammer was born in Oettingen in Bayern. From 1771 to 1778, he worked under Joseph Haydn as cellist of the Esterhazy's court ensemble in Eisenstadt and at the Eszterháza palace. It is thought that Haydn composed three cello concertos for him. His salary rose from already high—100 ducats and 30 kreuzers—a few times suggesting his extraordinary qualities as an instrumentalist. At the premiere of Haydn's oratorio Il Ritorno di Tobia, Hammer played his own cello concerto. During 1776–1813, he was member of the Viennese musicians' society.

From his works have survived sonatas for viola da gamba, viola d'amore and violoncello with basso continuo and also manuscript collections of instructive pieces and solo concertos for violoncello or viola da gamba and orchestra.
