= Jacques-Christophe Naudot =

French composer and flautist (c. 1690-1762)

Jacques-Christophe Naudot (c. 1690 – 25 November 1762) was a French composer and flautist. Little is known of his early life. He was married in 1719. Most of his compositions were published in Paris between 1726 and 1740. The poet Denesle (c. 1694-c. 1759) wrote a book called Syrinx, ou l'origine de la flutte. It was dedicated to Naudot, Michel Blavet and Lucas, and was published in 1739.

As of 1737 Naudot was a member of the Masonic lodges Sainte-Geneviève and Coustos-Villeroy in Paris. Along with three of his Masonic brethren, he was briefly jailed in the prison of For-l'Évêque during the anti-Masonic persecutions of 1740. Naudot dedicated several of his works to the Count of Clermont who became the grand master of the Masonic lodge in 1743.

The composer Joseph Boismortier was counted among his friends. Naudot's most widely available work is his concerto op. XVII,5, originally written for Danguy l'aîné (a Parisian hurdy-gurdy virtuoso). His other works include "Babioles" (baubles, trifles, toys) published about 1750. These are duets, described as being suitable for vielles (hurdy-gurdies) and musettes (bagpipes). The word "babiole" has not caught on in music circles, and later composers preferred the word Divertimento.

== Compositions ==
- Sonata in D, op. 1, no. 3/ no. 4
- 6 Flute Concertos, op. 6
- Caprice, op. 7
- Trio op. 8 for Flute, Violin, Oboe and Recorder
- Babioles op. 10 for Flute, Violin, Oboe and Recorder
- 6 Flute Concertos, op. 11
- Concerto in D Major, op. 17, no. 2
- Concerto in G, op. 17, no. 5
