= André da Silva Gomes =

Brazilian composer

André da Silva Gomes (1752–1844) was a Portuguese-born Brazilian composer from Lisbon. About 130 of his compositions are known, including mass settings, antiphons, psalm settings and other works for liturgical use. His Missa a Cinco Vozes is described as being in a style midway between Baroque and Classicism. He also published a treatise on counterpoint.

== Releases etc. ==
The Música Sacra Paulista album which was conducted by Jonas Christensen was released on the BASF label in 1980.

== See also ==
- List of Portuguese composers
