= Giuseppe Carcani =

Italian composer

Giuseppe Carcani (c. 1703–1779) was an Italian composer of 18th century music. He was born in Crema, and died in Piacenza. He composed works for instruments, organ, and voice. During his career, Carcani held positions in at least one cathedral of Italy. Few of his works have survived.

== Works ==
- Gloria (undated manuscript)
- Pastorale (organ)
- Trio sonata in D major
- La concordia del Tempo colla Fama (Venice, Ospedale degli Incurabili, 1740)

== Bibliography ==
- G. Carcani, Due arie per il soprano Elisabetta Mantovani da "La concordia del Tempo colla Fama" (Venezia, Ospedale degli Incurabili, 28 marzo 1740), a cura di Giovanni Tribuzio, Osaka-shi, Da Vinci Edition, 2017.
