= Bernardo Aliprandi =

Italian composer and cellist

Bernardo Aliprandi ( ?Milan 1710c – Frankfurt 1792c) was an Italian composer and cellist.

== Life ==
Aliprandi first appears in the records of Ospedale dei Mendicati in Venice, where he was nominated viola teacher in 1726. Another record in the same institute mentions his leave for the Bavarian court in 1732. In 1737, he succeeded Giovanni Battista Ferrandini as composer of chamber music and in 1744, he was promoted Konzertmeister. He retired in 1778.

In 1791, he was living in Frankfurt. A document reports him dead by 1793.

== Compositions ==
- Mitridate (B. Pasqualigo, 1738)
- Semiramide riconosciuta (Metastasio, 1740)
- Apollo trà le muse in Parnasso (Perozzo do Perozzi, 1737)
- Vocatio tertia ad nuptias filii regis (G. Arnold, 1737)
- De via a caelo (Neumayr, 1738)
- Iphigenia in Aulide (Munich, 1739), probably by Giovanni Porta
- Mitridate
- Stabat mater for soprano, alto and chamber (1749) (D-Dl).
- 18 sinfonias are listed in the 1753 catalogue of the Munich Hofkapelle

== Sources ==
- Jolando Scarpa (ed.): Arte e musica all'Ospedaletto. Schede d'archivio sull'attività musicale degli Ospedali dei Derelitti e dei Mendicanti di Venezia (sec. XVI–XVIII).
- James L. Jackman: Aliprandi, Bernardo in The New Grove Dictionary of Music and Musicians.
