= George Saville Carey =

George Saville Carey (1743-1807), was an entertainer and miscellaneous writer.

== Life ==
Carey was the posthumous son of Henry Carey, and was brought up in the trade of a printer. About 1763 he resolved to go upon the stage. Garrick, Mrs. Cibber, and others encouraged him in this course. He played at Covent Garden, where he failed to make his way and retired.

He then wrote The Inoculator, a comedy in three acts, and The Cottagers, an opera; neither these plays were staged, but they were published with some poems in 1766 by subscription. In 1768 Carey, under the pseudonym of "Paul Tell-Truth, esq.", published Liberty chastized; or Patriotism in Chains, a Tragi-comi-political Farce; and wrote The Nut-Brown Maid (published in his Analects 1770). In 1769 he published Shakespeare's Jubilee, a Masque; in 1770 The Old Women Weatherwise, an Interlude, presented at Drury Lane; The Magic Girdle, a Burletta, acted at the Marylebone Gardens; The Noble Pedlar, another burletta; and a collection of trifles called Analects in Verse and Prose, chiefly Dramatical, Satirical, and Pastoral.

Carey arranged, apparently about this time, a series of public entertainments at Covent Garden, the Haymarket, the Great Room in Panton Street, and other places, giving imitations of Foote, Weston, Ann Catley, and other popular actors and vocalists; and in 1776 he published a Lecture on Mimicry with a portrait, followed in 1777 by A Rural Ramble, to which is annexed a Poetical Tagg, or Brighthelmstone Guide. In 1787 he published Poetical Efforts; and in 1792, `The Dupes of Fancy, or Every Man his Hobby, a Farce, in Two Acts, performed at Pilgrim's benefit.

Meanwhile he continued his entertainments at Bath, Buxton, and elsewhere. By 1797 it was rumoured that his father was the actual author of God save the King, and that he himself had received a pension of 200 pounds a year on that ground. Corey announced that he had not received a pension, though his father had written the song; and he applied fruitlessly for an interview with the king to urge his claims.

In 1799 came out his Balnea, or History of all the Popular Watering-places of England, with another portrait, which reached a third edition in 1801. In 1800 he published One Thousand Eight Hundred, or I wish you a Happy New Year, a collection of about sixty of his songs, some sung by Incledon. In 1801 he published The Myrtle and Vine, or Complete Vocal Library, containing several Thousands of Songs with an Essay on Singing and Song-writing

In the summer of 1807 he was in London giving a series of entertainments, but he died suddenly of paralysis, aged 64, and was buried at the cost of friends.

An edition of his Old Women Weatherwise, in the form of a penny or halfpenny chap-book, was printed at Hull, without a date, but believed to be as late as 1825.
