= 1748 in music =

== Events ==
- April 12 – Possible premiere of Johann Sebastian Bach's last St Mark Passion pastiche (BC D 5) at St. Thomas Church, Leipzig. In addition to two movements by Bach, he incorporates seven arias from George Frideric Handel's Brockes Passion HWV 48 into the work.
- August 1748 – October 1749 – Repeat (possible concert hall) performance by Bach of Handel's Brockes Passion HWV 48 in a version by Bach.
- 1748–1749 – Johann Sebastian Bach composes his Mass in B minor BWV 232 (BC E 1).
- Holywell Music Room, Oxford, England, the first purpose-built concert hall in Europe, is opened.
- Nicola Porpora becomes Kapellmeister at Dresden.:

== Classical Music ==
- Johan Agrell – 6 Keyboard Sonatas, Op. 2
- Johann Sebastian Bach – 18 Chorale Preludes, BWV 651–668 finished (composed 1740–1748)
- Martin Berteau – 6 Cello Sonatas, Op. 1
- Michel Corrette
  - Les Pantins (No. 17 in his 25 Concertos Comiques)
  - La Tourière (No. 18 in his 25 Concertos Comiques)
- Elisabetta de Gambarini — Lessons and Songs Op. 2, for harpsichord
- George Frideric Handel
  - Joshua, HWV 64, oratorio premiered, composed 1747
  - Alexander Balus, HWV 65, oratorio premiered, composed 1747
  - Susanna, HWV 66, oratorio composed, premiered 1749
  - Solomon, HWV 67, oratorio composed, premiered 1749
- Jakob Friedrich Kleinknecht
  - 6 Flute Sonatas, Op. 1
  - 3 Trio Sonatas, Op. 2
- Jean-Pierre Pagin - 6 Violin Sonatas, Op. 1
- Peter Pasqualino – 6 Cello Duets
- Giovanni Alberto Ristori
  - Didone abbandonata (secular cantata)
  - Lavinia a Turno, M.144 (secular cantata)
- Giuseppe Tartini – 6 Violin Sonatas, Op. 6
- Georg Philipp Telemann – Lukas Passion, TWV 5:33
- Burke Thumoth – 12 Irish and 12 Scotch Airs with Variations

== Opera ==
- Joseph Bodin de Boismortier – Daphnis et Chloé, Op. 102
- Baldassare Galuppi – Demetrio
- Christoph W. Gluck – La Semiramide riconosciuta, Wq.13
- Karl Heinrich Graun – Ifigenia in Aulide, GraunWV B:I:18
- Johann Adolf Hasse – Demofoonte
- Niccolò Jommelli – L’amore in maschera
- Gennaro Manna – Lucio Papirio dittatore
- Jean-Philippe Rameau
  - Zaïs, premiered on February 29
  - Pygmalion, RCT 52, premiered on August 27
  - Les surprises de l'Amour, premiered on November 27

== Publications ==
- Johann Sebastian Bach – 6 Choräle von verschiedener Art, BWV 645-650 (Zella: Johann Georg Schübler)
- Louis de Caix d'Hervelois – Pièces de viole, Livre 5 (Paris: Madame Boivin, Le Clerc et Brolonne)
- Francesco Geminiani – Rules for Playing in a True Taste, Op. 8 (variations for solo or accompanied instrument)
- William Hayes – 6 Cantatas (London: Simpson)
- Jean-Joseph de Mondonville – Pièces de Clavecin avec voix ou violon, Op. 5
- Carlo Tessarini – Contrasto armonico ... con suoi rinforzi, for 3 violins and basso continuo, Op. 10 (Paris)
- Gregor Werner — Neuer und sehr curios- Musicalischer Instrumental-Calendar

== Births ==
- February – Hedvig Wigert, opera singer (died 1780)
- February 5 – Christian Gottlob Neefe, conductor, teacher (Ludwig van Beethoven was a student), and composer (died 1798)
- March 5 — William Shield, violinist and composer (died 1829)
- May 5 – Francesco Azopardi, music theorist and composer (died 1809)
- April 20 – Georg Michael Telemann, composer (died 1831)
- August 4 – Maximilian Stadler, editor and composer (died 1833)
- August 11 – Joseph Schuster, composer (died 1812)
- August 31 – Jean-Étienne Despréaux, singer, dancer and composer (died 1820)
- November 30 – Joachim Albertini, composer (died 1812)

== Deaths ==
- January 26 – Pierre Rameau, dancing-master (born 1674)
- February 26 – Jean-Baptiste Landé, ballet dancer
- March 7 – William Corbett, violinist and composer (born 1680)
- March 10 – Giovanni Perroni, cellist and composer (born 1688)
- March 17 – Charles King, choir-master and composer (born 1687)
- March 23 — Johann Gottfried Walther, composer and theoretician (born 1684)
- April 6 – David Kellner, German composer (born c.1670)
- November 25 — Isaac Watts, hymn writer (born 1674)
- date unknown
  - Jacques Loeillet, oboist and composer (born 1685)
  - David Tecchler, luthier (born 1666)
