= Joachim Albertini =

Italian composer (1748–1812)

Joachim Albertini or Gioacchino Albertini (30 November 1748, Pesaro – 27 March 1812, Warsaw) was an Italian-born composer, who spent most of his life in Poland. His opera Don Juan albo Ukarany libertyn (Don Giovanni or The Libertine Penalized) was performed in the 1780s with both Italian and Polish libretti.

== Works ==
=== Stage ===
- La cacciatrice brillante, intermezzo, libretto by G. Mancinelli, Rome, Teatro di Tordinona, February 1772
- Przyjazd pana, polish comedy, Warsaw, 1781
- Don Juan albo Ukarany libertyn (Don Juan, or The Libertine Punished), opera in three acts, libretto by Giovanni Bertati, translation by Wojciech Bogusławski, Warsaw, 23 February 1783
- Circe und Ulysses, opera seria, libretto by Jonas Ludwig von Heß, Hamburg, 1786
- Virginia, opera seria, libretto by Luigi Romanelli, Rome, Teatro delle Dame, 7 January 1786 (Italian libretto)
- Scipione Africano, opera seria, libretto by Nicolò Minato, Rome, 1789
- La vergine vestale, opera seria, libretto by Michelangelo Prunetti, Rome, Teatro delle Dame, 2 January 1803 (Italian libretto)
- Kapelmajster polski (The Polish Kapellmeister), intermezzo in one act, libretto by L. A. Dmuszewski, Warsaw, 28 October 1808

=== Other works ===
- Missa solemnis, 28 August 1782
- Offertorium
- Kantata na rocznicę elekeji Króla (Cantata on the Anniversary of the King’s Election), 7 September 1790
- Symphony in D, 1791
- Septet, 25 April 1806

== Bibliography ==
- Barbara Chmara-Żaczkiewicz, "Albertini, Gioacchino", The New Grove Dictionary of Music and Musicians, Second Edition (London: Macmillan, 2001). ISBN 0-333-60800-3.
