= 1752 in music =

== Events ==
- February 3 – Opéra-Théâtre de Metz Métropole in Metz, Lorraine, is opened.
- June 13 – Composer Maria Teresa Agnesi marries Pier Antonio Pinottini.
- September 25 – Antonio Soler becomes organist at El Escorial.
- November 3 – George Frideric Handel is operated on for an eye condition, at Guy's Hospital in London.
- Christoph Willibald Gluck becomes Konzertmeister at Vienna.
- Artist Thomas Gainsborough joins the Ipswich Musical Society; he later paints the portrait of English composer Joseph Gibbs
- Nicola Porpora leaves Dresden for Vienna.
- Johann Wilhelm Hertel replaces his father, Johann Christian Hertel, as Kapellmeister at the court of Mecklenburg-Strelitz.
- Anton Cajetan Adlgasser marries Maria Josepha, daughter of Johann Ernst Eberlin.
- Ferdinando Bertoni becomes first organist at St Mark's Basilica in Venice.

== Classical music ==
- George Frideric Handel – Jephtha
- Johann Adolph Scheibe – Der Tempel des Ruhmes
- Georg Philipp Telemann
  - Concerto à 4, TWV 43:D4
  - Sonata à 4, TWV 43:F1

== Opera ==
- Jean-Baptiste Cardonne – Amaryllis
- Christoph Willibald Gluck – La clemenza di Tito, Wq.16
- Carl Heinrich Graun
  - L'Orfeo, GraunWV B:I:25
  - Il giudizio di Paride, GraunWV B:I:26
- Niccolò Jommelli – I rivali delusi (intermezzo)
- Jean-Jacques Rousseau – Le Devin du Village (part of Rousseau's response in the Querelle des Bouffons)

== Publications ==
- Filippo Palma – Sei arie con istromenti, Op. 4 (London: John Johnson)
- Domenico Scarlatti – 12 Sonatas Modernas para Clavicordio, Libro 1 (London: J. Johnson)
- Georg Philipp Telemann – Second Livre de duo pour deux violons, fluttes ou hautbois (Paris: Mr. Blavet, Mme. Boivin, Mr. Le Clerc, Melle. Castagneri), 6 sonatas without bass, TWV 40:124–129

== Methods and theory writings ==
- Charles Avison – Essay on Musical Expression
- Jean le Rond D'Alembert – Eléments de musique théorique et pratique
- Johann Joachim Quantz – Versuch einer Anweisung die Flöte traversiere zu spielen, a treatise on playing the flute
- Jean-Philippe Rameau – Nouvelles réflexions de M. Rameau sur sa Démonstration du principe de l'harmonie
- Joseph Riepel – Anfangsgründe zur musicalischen Setzkunst

== Births ==
- January 24 – Muzio Clementi, composer and pianist (died 1832)
- February 11 – Charles Knyvett, singer and arranger (died 1822)
- February 12 – Josef Reicha, conductor and composer (died 1795)
- March 29 – Edward Jones, composer and harpist (died 1824)
- April 4 – Niccolò Antonio Zingarelli, composer (died 1837)
- April 5 – Sébastien Érard, piano-maker (died 1831)
- May 2 – Ludwig August Lebrun, composer (died 1790)
- May 14 – Juliane Reichardt, pianist, singer and composer (died 1783)
- May 31 – John Marsh, composer (died 1828)
- September 8 – Carl Stenborg, operatic tenor and composer (died 1813)
- September 30 – Justin Heinrich Knecht, organist and composer (died 1817)
- October 22 – Ambrogio Minoja, composer (died 1825)
- November 25 – Johann Friedrich Reichardt, composer and music critic (died 1814)
- November 30 – André da Silva Gomes, Brazilian composer (died 1844)
- December 3 – Georg Friedrich Fuchs, composer, clarinetist and music teacher (died 1821)
- December 4 – Ange-Étienne-Xavier Poisson de La Chabeaussière, librettist and playwright (died 1820)
- date unknown
  - Francesco Bianchi, composer and music collector (died 1810)
  - Leonard McNally, librettist and writer (died 1820)
  - Abraham Wood, military drummer and composer (died 1804)

== Deaths ==
- January 1 – Shah Abdul Latif Bhittai, Sindhi Sufi scholar, mystic, saint, poet, and musician (born 1689)
- March 7 – Pietro Castrucci, violinist and composer (born 1679)
- June 19 – Hieronymus Albrecht Hass, harpsichord and clavichord maker
- July 20 – Johann Christoph Pepusch, composer (born 1667)
- July 24 – Michael Christian Festing, violinist and composer
- date unknown
  - Girolamo Donnini, composer and conductor
  - Anton Wilhelm Solnitz, composer (born c.1708)
