= Domènec Terradellas =

Catalan opera composer with Italian works

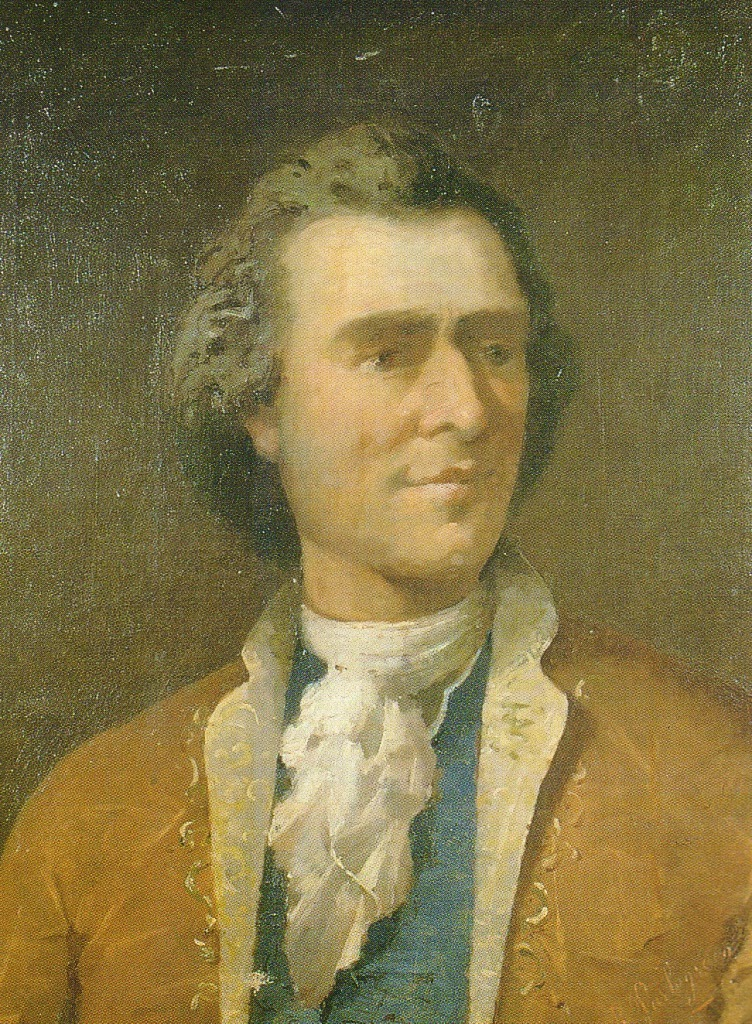
Portrait of Domènec Terradellas (1885) by Beniamino Parlagreco

Domènec Terradellas (baptized 13 February 1713, Barcelona – 20 May 1751, Rome) was a Spanish opera composer. The birthdate is sometimes incorrectly given as 1711. (Note: This date was given by Burney) Carreras i Bulbena did extensive research in contemporary documents, such as baptismal records, and found that the correct date was 1713. All his works are thoroughly Italian in style.

== Career ==
Born in Barcelona, the son of a day laborer, his early musical training is unknown. It has been said that Terradellas studied with the composer Francisco Valls in Barcelona, but Carreras i Bulbena's research in Barcelona uncovered no evidence of this. On 23 May 1732, he entered in Naples as a student in the Conservatorio dei Poveri di Gesù Cristo. He studied composition with the famous Neapolitan composer, Francesco Durante.

Terradellas was one of a group of foreign-born composers who studied in Italy and adopted the Italian style. The reason for this is that Italian opera was by far the dominant genre of opera at this time, attracting composers from all across Europe: George Frideric Handel, Johann Adolph Hasse, Johann Christian Bach (all Germans), Thomas Arne (an Englishman), Josef Mysliveček (a Czech), and Vicente Martín y Soler (a Spaniard).

=== Italy ===
His first work, an oratorio, Giuseppe Riconosciuto, with text by Metastasio was first performed in Naples in 1736. The musicologist Felipe Pedrell reported seeing the manuscript in the library of San Giacomo degli Spagnuoli in Rome in 1898. The library was catalogued shortly after his visit, but when he returned in 1902, the score was missing and was not listed in the catalogue. This was probably a student work, because a note in the archives, dated May 1736, states that "Il figliolo Terradellas è sempre in conservatorio" [Terradellas is still (a student) at the conservatory]. Terradellas's first opera, Astarto, was performed at Rome in 1739 during the Carnival season. He may have collaborated with Gaetano Latilla on an opera Romolo, performed in Naples during the same year, but the libretto names only Latilla as the composer. (Note: The libretto of Romolo is in the Liceo Musicale di Bologna.)

A serenata, La Cerere, was performed in Rome in 1740, probably privately for a group of clergymen, and the three-act comic opera Gl'intrichi delle cantarine was performed in Naples during the same season. Carreras does not mention Cerere, but the libretto in the Library of Congress, Washington D.C., attests to Terradellas's authorship and the date of performance. Carreras also mentions operas for which no documentation has been found. The operas are Artemesia, said to have been performed in Rome in 1739, and Issipile, supposedly performed in Florence in 1742.

San Giacomo degli Spagnuoli is a church established for Spanish residents in Rome. This church was already quite old in 1743, because Spaniards had been coming to Rome for centuries. Terradellas was approved as maestro di cappella by the congregation of that church on 1 May 1743 with a salary of 10 scudi per month. During his tenure, he composed at least four masses, a half dozen motets, as well as other short works for the service. Later, trouble developed between Terradellas and one of his subordinates, and Terradellas was dismissed in August 1745 after two years and three months.

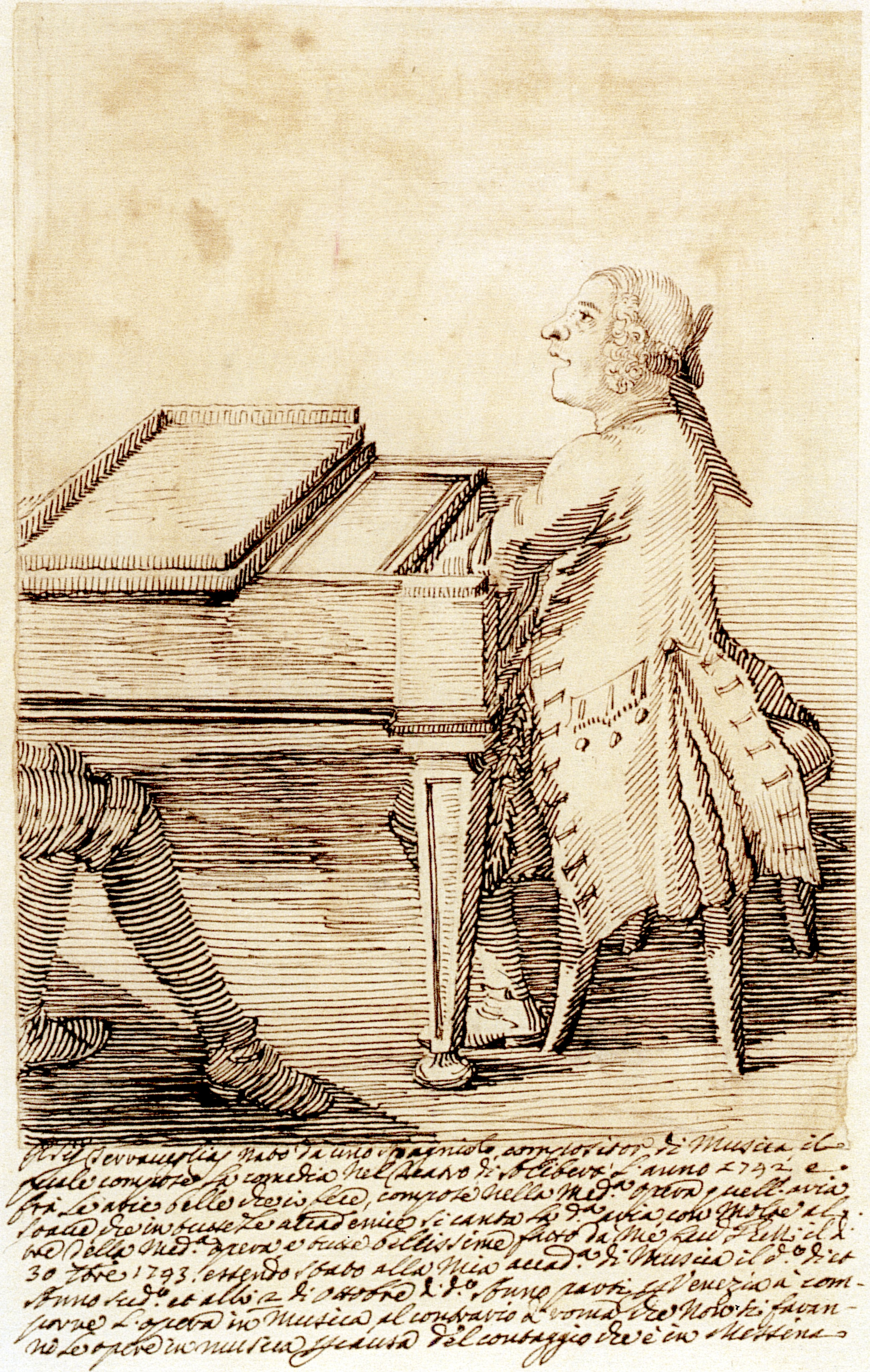
Domènec Terradellas, caricature by Pier Leone Ghezzi, 1743

His opera, La Merope, was performed during the Carnival of 1743. Alfred Loewenberg, in the Annals of Opera, lists three other performances of this opera, but provides no documentation. The dates given are Florence, Carnival of 1743 and revived there 26 December 1749; Livorno during the Carnival of 1744; and Ancona during the Carnival of 1746. Since there are two extant manuscripts of this opera, it seems possible that there was at least one other performance. A libretto in the library of Santa Cecilia names Terradellas as the composer of a Merope, performed in Florence in 1750, but the attribution is only written in pencil on the flyleaf facing the title page. Comparison of this libretto with that of 1743 casts serious doubt on its authenticity. The 1750 libretto has 22 arias, only five of which have the same text as the arias in the 1743 libretto.

During the Carnival of 1744, his Artaserse was performed in Venice. Loewenberg states that this opera was given on several other Italian stages, but no documentation has been found. The manuscript in Venice is dated 1744.

Terradellas's most productive years were during his tenure at San Giacomo, as evidenced by the two operas and the list of religious works. These two operas, while very different in several stylistic features, are representative works.

Terradellas's setting of Semiramide was performed during the Carnival of 1746 in Florence. Six arias from this opera were published by John Walsh in London, while only two manuscript arias have been found in continental libraries. These arias were evidently taken by him when he travelled to London a few months later and were incorporated, along with arias from Merope and Artaserse, in the collection Dudici arie e due duetti. This is one of only three publications of music by Terradellas during his lifetime. The other two were the arias from Mitridate and Bellerofonte, also published by John Walsh in London in his "Favorite Songs" series.

=== London ===
The artistic climate in London was quite different from that of Italy. Italy was the hub of operatic activity with its most important theaters in Rome, Naples, Venice and Florence, although every town of any size had an opera theatre. London, on the other hand, was fairly remote from the opera centres at this time. Even Handel, who was backed by the king, experienced difficulty from time to time. Opera did not have the long and continuous history in London that it had in Italy, and therefore it did not flourish as in Italy. Events of the preceding seasons led to Terradellas's sojourn in England. Charles Burney notes the indifference of the public toward opera in London during these years, when their interests were being absorbed by native playwrights such as Colley Cibber. Any opera venture during these years was to prove unfortunate for the producer. Handel had learned this unfortunate lesson several years earlier. As Horace Walpole said in a letter dated December 5, 1746:

We have operas, but no company at them; the Prince and Lord Middlesex impresarii. Plays only are in fashion: at one house the best company that perhaps ever were together, Quinn, Garrick, Mrs. Pritchard, and Mrs. Cibber.

Letters and other literature of the period attest to the vast financial losses suffered by producers of opera. Lord Middlesex had a passion for producing operas, and he was willing to sacrifice his own fortune and the fortunes of others to bring new works to the stage. He invited Terradellas to come to London for the 1746–47 season. His arrival was celebrated by the inclusion of one of his arias, Merope II, 12 (Artaserse II, 7) in the pasticcio, Anibale in Capua. This opera was the first of four subscriptions planned by Lord Middlesex and his partners, six nights in November, ten in December, seventeen in January (not involving Terradellas), and fourteen in March.

Anibale, as with the following operas, was performed on Tuesday and Saturday nights. The exact dates were as follows: Tuesday, November 4; Saturday, November 8; Tuesday, November 18; Saturday, November 22; Tuesday, November 25; and Saturday, November 29. The performances began at 6:00 P.M., and the opera included ballet. For the third performance, the advertisement announced the inclusion of some new arias. On 2 December 1746, the rehearsal of Mitridate was announced.

The subscribers to the second subscription for operas, are desired to take notice, that on Thursday Morning next will be a General Rehearsal of the new Opera called Mitridate upon the stage, agreeable to the printed Proposals, and doors will be open'd at Ten, and the Rehearsal will begin at Eleven of the Clock. No persons will be admitted without a Subscriber's ticket, and each ticket will admit four persons.

On Thursday, December 11, a performance of John Gay's Beggar's Opera opened at Covent Garden with Susanna Arne Cibber (sister of Thomas A. Arne) as Polly. The dates of the performances of Mitridate were as follows:

Tuesday, December 9, 1746; Saturday, December 13; Tuesday, December 16; Saturday, December 20; Tuesday, December 23; Saturday, December 27; Tuesday, December 30 [Comment: "At the end of the opera, a Piece of Scenery in a taste entirely new."] Saturday January 3, 1747 (above comment repeated in Advertisement); Tuesday, January 6; Saturday, January 10.

His other opera for the London stage, Bellerofonte, premiered on Tuesday, March 24. Each advertisement announced a fireworks display after the performance as well as dances in the opera.

Nothing is known of the life of Terradellas for the next three years. The several liturgical works in the church of St. Gudule in Brussels may offer a hint as to what Terradellas might have been doing during this period.

== Compositions ==
Operas (in chronological order)

- Astarto (Rome, 1739)
- La Cerere (1740)
- Gl'intrichi delle cantarine (Naples, 1740)
- La Merope (Rome, 1743)
- Artaserse (Venice, 1744)
- Semiramide (Florence, 1746)
- Mitridate (London, 1746)
- Bellerofonte (London, 1747)
- La Didone (Turin, 1750)
- Imeneo in Atene (Venice, 1750)
- Sesostri (Rome, 1751) (There was another performance of Sesostri in Barcelona in 1754 with some aria substitutions)

Works for religious services (Rome, Iglesia National de España)

- 3 Masses
- Praestantissime
- O Diem
- Luminosa
- Beatus vir
- Confitebor
- Credidi
- Dixit Dominus
- Laudate
- Laetatus sum
- Domine ad adjuvandum
- Sat laetitae
- other brief liturgical works
