= Domenico Alberti =

Italian composer

Domenico Alberti (c. 1710 – 14 October 1746 (according to other sources: 1740)) was an Italian singer, harpsichordist, and composer.

Sonata n. 8 for harpsichord in g

Alberti was born in Venice and studied music with Antonio Lotti. He wrote operas, songs, and sonatas for keyboard instruments, for which he is best known today. His sonatas frequently employ arpeggiated accompaniment in the left hand in one of several patterns that are now collectively known as Alberti bass. Alberti was one of the earliest composers to use those patterns, but was not the first or only one. The most well-known of these patterns consists of regular broken chords, with the lowest note sounding first, then the highest, then the middle and then the highest again, with the pattern repeated.

Today, Alberti is regarded as a minor composer, and his works are played or recorded only irregularly. However, the Alberti bass was used by many later composers, and it became an important element in much keyboard music of the classical music era.

An example of Alberti bass (Mozart's Piano Sonata, K 545):

In his own lifetime, Alberti was known as a singer, and often used to accompany himself on the harpsichord. In 1736, he served as a page for Pietro Andrea Cappello, the Venetian ambassador to Spain. While at the Spanish court, the famous castrato singer Farinelli heard him sing. Farinelli was said to have been impressed, although Alberti was an amateur.

Alberti's best known pieces are his keyboard sonatas, although even they are very rarely performed. It is thought he wrote around 36 sonatas, of which 14 have survived. They all have two movements, each in binary form.

It is probable that Mozart's first violin sonatas, written at the age of seven, were modeled on Alberti's work.
