= Joseph Beer (clarinetist) =

Joseph Beer (18 May 1744, Grünwald, Bohemia – 28 October 1812, Berlin) was one of the first internationally famous clarinet virtuosos, with connections to many major composers of the era.

Beer served as trumpeter first in the Austrian and then in the French army during the Seven Years' War. In 1771 he went to Paris, and there took up the clarinet, on which he rapidly became the first major performer of his time. In 1782 he left Paris, and traveled through Holland, Italy, Russia, and Hungary.

As a performer Beer effected a complete revolution in the clarinet, which he greatly improved by the addition of a fifth key. Until aged nearly fifty he had heard only French players, but having heard in Brussels a German performer, Schwartz, he discovered the instrument's tonal capabilities, and finally became as celebrated for the softness and purity of his tone, for the delicacy of his nuances, and especially his decrescendo, as he was for his execution. His compositions comprise three concertos for two clarinets, variations, and duets.

== Sources ==
- Hamilton, Mary Catherine: "Beer, Joseph" in A Dictionary of Music and Musicians (1900) edited by George Grove
- Arrey von Dommer (1875). "Beer, Joseph" . Allgemeine Deutsche Biographie (in German). Vol. 2. Leipzig: Duncker & Humblot. pp. 249–250. (in German)
- Albert R. Rice. "Beer, Joseph." Grove Music Online. Oxford Music Online. Oxford University Press. Web. 18 Jan. 2015. <http://www.oxfordmusiconline.com/subscriber/article/grove/music/02513> (subscription access).
