= 1754 in music =

== Events ==
- Composer Christoph Graupner loses his sight.
- Publication of Giuseppe Tartini's treatise Trattato di musica secondo la vera scienza dell'armonia.
- Giovanni Paisiello goes to the Conservatorio di S. Onofrio at Naples, where he studies under Francesco Durante.

== Classical music ==
- Joseph Anton Xaver Auffmann – Triplex concentus organicus, seu III. concerti organici à octo instrumentis (3 organ concertos), Op. 1 (Augsburg)
- Michael Festing – Violin Sonatas (published posthumously)
- François-Joseph Gossec – Symphony No. 1
- John Jones – 8 Setts of Lessons for harpsichord (London)
- Pietro Locatelli – La foresta incantata (ballet)
- Pietro Domenico Paradisi – 12 Harpsichord Sonatas
- Joan Baptista Pla and Josep Pla – 6 Trio Sonatas
- Nicola Porpora
  - 6 duetti latini per la Passione di Gesù Cristo
  - 12 Violin Sonatas, Op. 12
- John Stanley – Ten Voluntarys for organ or harpsichord, Op. 7 (London)

== Opera ==
- Vincenzo Legrenzio Ciampi – Didone
- Nicola Conforto – Ezio
- Baldassare Galuppi – Il filosofo di campagna
- Christoph Willibald Gluck – Le Cinesi, Wq.18
- Johann Adolph Hasse – Artemisia
- Jean-Philippe Rameau
  - Anacréon, RCT 30
  - La Naissance d'Osiris, RCT 48

== Methods and theory writings ==
- Dom Philippe-Joseph Caffiaux – Histoire de la musique depuis l’Antiquité jusqu’en 1754
- Michel Corrette – Prototipes contenant des leçons d’accompagnement
- Friedrich Wilhelm Marpurg – Historisch-Kritische Beyträge zur Aufnahme der Musik
- Johann Mattheson – Plus Ultra
- Jean-Philippe Rameau – Observations sur notre instinct pour la musique, et sur son principe
- Giuseppe Tartini – Trattato di musica

== Births ==
- March 15 – Silvestro Palma, opera composer (died 1834)
- May 2 – Vicente Martín y Soler, composer of opera and ballet (died 1806)
- May 12 – Franz Anton Hoffmeister, composer and music publisher (died 1812)
- June 21 – Caroline Louise von Klencke, librettist and poet (died 1802)
- July 15 – Jacob French, singing master and composer (died 1817)
- July 18 – Joseph Siegmund Bachmann, composer and organist (died 1825)
- August 28 – Peter Winter, opera composer (died 1825)
- September – Elizabeth Ann Linley, singer (died 1792)
- December 9 – Étienne Ozi, bassoonist and composer (died 1813)
- December 20 – Joseph Schubert, violinist and composer (died 1837)
- date unknown
  - Hans Gram, organist and composer (died 1804)
  - Michel Yost, composer and clarinetist (died 1786)

== Deaths ==
- May 16 – Giovanni Carlo Maria Clari, composer and Kapellmeister (born 1677)
- June 22 – Nicolas Siret, organist, harpsichordist and composer (born 1663)
- October 6 – Adam Falckenhagen, lutenist and composer (born 1697)
- probable
  - Mlle Guédon de Presles, singer, composer and actress (date of birth unknown)
  - Seedo, German theatre composer working in Britain (born c.1700)
