= Giovanni Benedetto Platti =

Italian composer

Giovanni Benedetto Platti was born possibly 9 July 1697 (according to other sources 1690, 1692, 1700) in Padua, then belonging to Venice. He was an Italian Baroque composer and oboist. He died 11 January 1763 in Würzburg.

== Life ==
Platti studied music in Italy (mostly singing, the oboe and the violin). While in Italy, where he stayed until 1722, he probably saw the recently invented fortepiano; a few of his keyboard solo sonatas and concertos might have been composed for it instead of the harpsichord, but this point is debatable. In his chamber works (duets and trios), the harpsichord is clearly the instrument required. No "piano" or "forte" indications are on Platti's keyboard parts in his concertos for harpsichord and strings, though. Also, the extension of at least one of these concertos asks for a D that is beyond Cristofori's instrument's compass (4 octaves CC to c4).

In 1722, he was called to Würzburg to work for the prince-bishop of Bamberg and Würzburg, Johann Philipp Franz von Schönborn. There he married Theresia Langprückner, a soprano singer with whom he had at least two children. Platti spent the rest of his life in the town, working as a singer, instrument virtuoso, composer and conductor. His duties included finding musicians for the court, as is evident from one of his extant autograph letters.

== Works ==
=== Sacred works ===
- Messa a cappella in C major (Coro: Soprano, Contralto, Tenore, Basso) e Basso Continuo. Kyrie, Credo, Et incarnatus, Sanctus, Osanna, Benedictus, Agnus Dei
- Messa in F major (Coro: Soprano, Contralto, tenore, Basso) Violins I/II, Viola, Violoncello e Basso Continuo (Organ) . Kyrie, Gloria, Credo, Sanctus, Osanna, Benedictus (with solos), Agnus Dei,
- Messa in A major (Coro: Soprano, Contralto, tenore, Basso) Violins I/II, Viola, Violoncello e Basso Continuo (organ) Kyrie, Gloria, Credo, Et incarnatus, Sanctus, Osanna, Benedictus (solo for tenor), Agnus Dei.
- Messa Concertata (Requiem) in c minor. Soprano solo, tenore solo, Basso I/II soli. (Coro: Soprano, Contralto, tenore, Basso). Violins I/II, Viola, Violoncello e Basso Continuo (organ). Requiem aeternam, Te decet hymnus, Kyrie, Dies irae, Quantus tremor, Tuba mirum, Lacrymosa, Huie ergo, Domine Jesu Christe, Quam olim Abrahae, Sanctus, Hosanna, Benedictus, Hosanna, Agnus Dei, Lux aeterna.
- Miserere in g minor. Soprano solo, Tenore solo, Basso solo. (Coro: Soprano, Contralto, Tenore, Basso). Oboe solo, Violins I/II, Viola, Violoncello e basso continuo.
- Stabat Mater in c minor. Basso solo. Flute solo, Oboe solo, Violas I/II, Violoncello e Basso Continuo (organ).
- Offertorium in B♭ major - A otto voci (2 Soprani, 2 Contralti, 2 Tenori, 2 Bassi). Violins I/II, Viola, Violoncello e basso continuo (organ).

Other sacred works mentioned in different sources are now lost.

=== Profane vocal works ===
- Cantata in C major: "Corre dal bosco al prato la misera cervetta" for Soprano, Clavicembalo obbligato, Violins I/II, Violas, Violoncello and basso continuo.
- Cantata in A major: "Già libero, già sciolto" for Soprano, Violins I/II, Viola, Violoncello and basso continuo.
- Cantata in B♭ major: "Sdegni e disprezzi" for Soprano, Violiins I/II, Viola, Violoncello and basso continuo.
- 1 Serenata, only the text is available, the music is lost.
- 2 Arias for Soprano and Harpsichord - only the music is available, the text is lost.

=== Instrumental music ===
- Concert for oboe and strings. oboe solo, Violins I/II, Viola, Violoncello and basso continuo.
- A total of 9 concertos for harpsichord and string quartet (Violins I/II, Viola and Cello) (1 in C major, 1 in c minor, 1 in D major, 1 in E♭ major, 2 in F major, 2 in G major, 1 in A major). The copies of the manuscripts now in Berlin (Staatsbibliothek Preußischer Kulturbesitz) mention "cembalo" as the solo instrument. At least one copy of these concertos bears the date 1743 in the manuscript copy (?) now in Berlin. A tenth concerto for harpsichord and string quartet, in g minor, was also probably written as its first bars appear on an old J.U. Haffner edition, mentioning this concerto and the existing D major one (listed as I 50 by Alberto Iesuè).No copies of this g minor concerto have yet been found, though.
- Concert for Violin and strings in A major. Violin solo, Violins I/II, Viola, Violoncello and basso continuo.
- 28 concertos for cello and string quartet or other string accompaniments, sometimes string trio (2 violins and cello), sometimes a violone instead of a viola. All of them with basso continuo.
- 23 Trio Sonatas or simply Trios for different instruments (violin, cello and harpsichord; oboe, fagotto e violone; violin violoncello obbligato e violone; oboe, violin and basso; flauto traverso, violino o oboe e basso continuo).
- 1 sonata in A major for Violin and basso continuo.
- 12 sonatas for violoncello and basso continuo.
- 6 flute sonatas op. 3.(flute and basso continuo)
- 1 sonata for oboe and basso continuo.
- 4 Ricercate for violin and cello.
- 20 sonatas for harpsichord solo.
- 1 Arioso e Allegro for solo harpsichord solo.
- 1 Fantasia-Gavotta for harpsichord solo.

(This list of compositions is from the book by ALBERTO IESUÈ: Le Opere di Giovanni Benedetto Platti - catalogo tematico. Edizioni de "I SOLISTI VENETI". Padova, 1999. In this book the author lists the works which have been published and those that exist only in manuscript form.)

== Bibliography ==
Alberto Iesuè, Le Opere di Giovanni Benedetto Platti – Thematic Cathalog, Edizioni de I Solisti Veneti, Padova, 1999 (sources : www.edizionisolistiveneti.it)
