= 1747 in music =

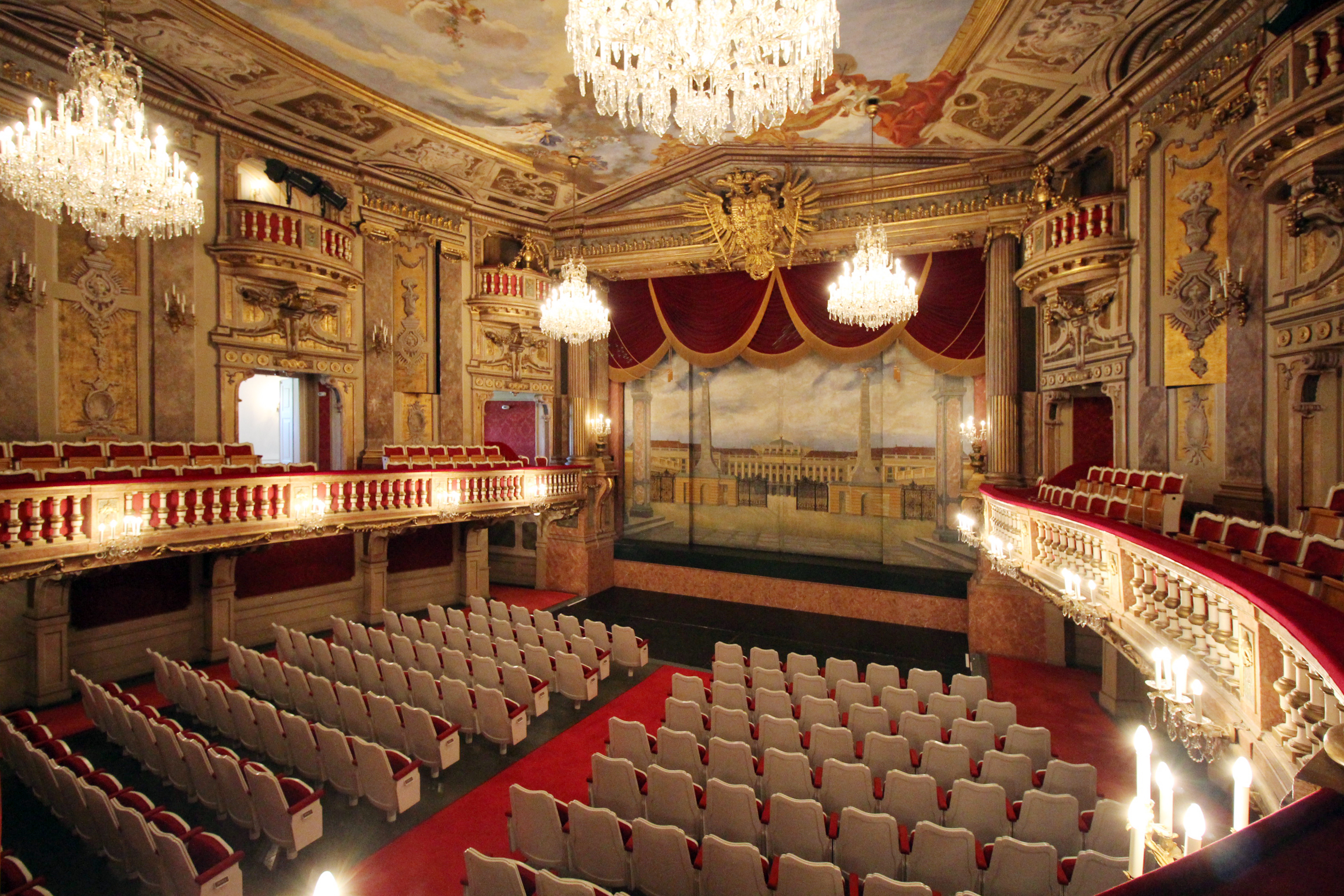

1747 was an important year in music.

== Events ==
- April 30 – Possible premiere of Johann Sebastian Bach's last St Mark Passion pastiche (BC D 5) at St. Nicholas Church, Leipzig. In addition to two movements by Bach, he incorporates seven arias from George Frideric Handel's Brockes Passion HWV 48 into the work.
- October 4 – Schlosstheater Schönbrunn opens.
- Johann Sebastian Bach is presented to King Frederick II of Prussia in Potsdam; the king plays a theme for Bach and challenges the musician to improvise a six-part fugue based on it.
- Luigi Boccherini goes to Rome to study the cello.

== Classical music ==
- Maria Teresa Agnesi – Il restauro d'Arcadia (cantata)
- Carl Philipp Emanuel Bach – Trio Sonata in F major, H.576
- Johann Sebastian Bach
  - Vom Himmel hoch, da komm ich her, BWV 769
  - Musikalisches Opfer, BWV 1079 (the Musical Offering)
- William Boyce – 12 Trio Sonatas
- Antoine Forqueray – Pièces de viole mises en pièces de clavecin (posthumously published)
- George Frideric Handel – Judas Maccabeus (oratorio)
- Jean-Marie Leclair – 6 Duos for 2 Violins, Op. 12
- Jean-Philippe Rameau – La Dauphine (harpsichord piece).
- Giuseppe Sammartini – 6 Concerti Grossi, Op. 5
- Giuseppe Tartini – L'arte del arco (first set of 17 variations on a theme from Corelli's Op. 5) (attribution to Tartini in question)

== Opera ==
- Nicola Calandra – Lo Barone Landolfo
- Geronimo Cordella – La Faustina
- Johann Adolf Hasse
  - Leucippo
  - La spartana generosa
- Giuseppe de Majo – Arianna e Teseo
- Jean-Philippe Rameau – Les Fêtes de l'Hymen et de l'Amour, RCT 38

== Births ==
- February – Narciso Casanovas, Spanish composer (died 1799)
- March 29 – Johann Wilhelm Hässler, German organist and composer (died 1822)
- March 31 – Johann Abraham Peter Schulz, musician and composer (died 1800)
- June 24 – John O'Keeffe, Irish librettist (died 1833)
- June 26 – Leopold Kozeluch, prolific composer and teacher (died 1818)
- July 23 – Faustino Arévalo, hymnographer (died 1824)
- September 22 – Józef Wybicki, composer and poet (died 1822)
- October 26 – Giovanni Mane Giornovichi, violinist and composer (died 1804)
- November 24 – Felice Alessandri, Italian composer (died 1798)
- date unknown
  - Narciso Casanovas, Spanish monk and composer
  - Michael Ehregott Grose, Danish organist and composer (died 1795)
  - François Tourte, maker of violin bows (died 1835)

== Deaths ==
- January 2 – Jean-Féry Rebel, violinist and composer (born 1666)
- February 2 – Francisco Valls, church composer (born 1665)
- February 26 – Johann Nicolaus Mempel, musician (born 1713)
- May 26 – Robert Valentine – Baroque composer (born 1674)
- June 6 – Jean-Baptiste Barrière, cellist and composer (born 1707)
- June 19 – Alessandro Marcello, composer (born 1669)
- July 9 – Giovanni Bononcini, composer (born 1670)
