= Carlo Tessarini =

Italian composer (1690–c.1766)

Carlo Tessarini (1690 – after 15 December 1766), was an Italian composer and violinist in the late Baroque era.

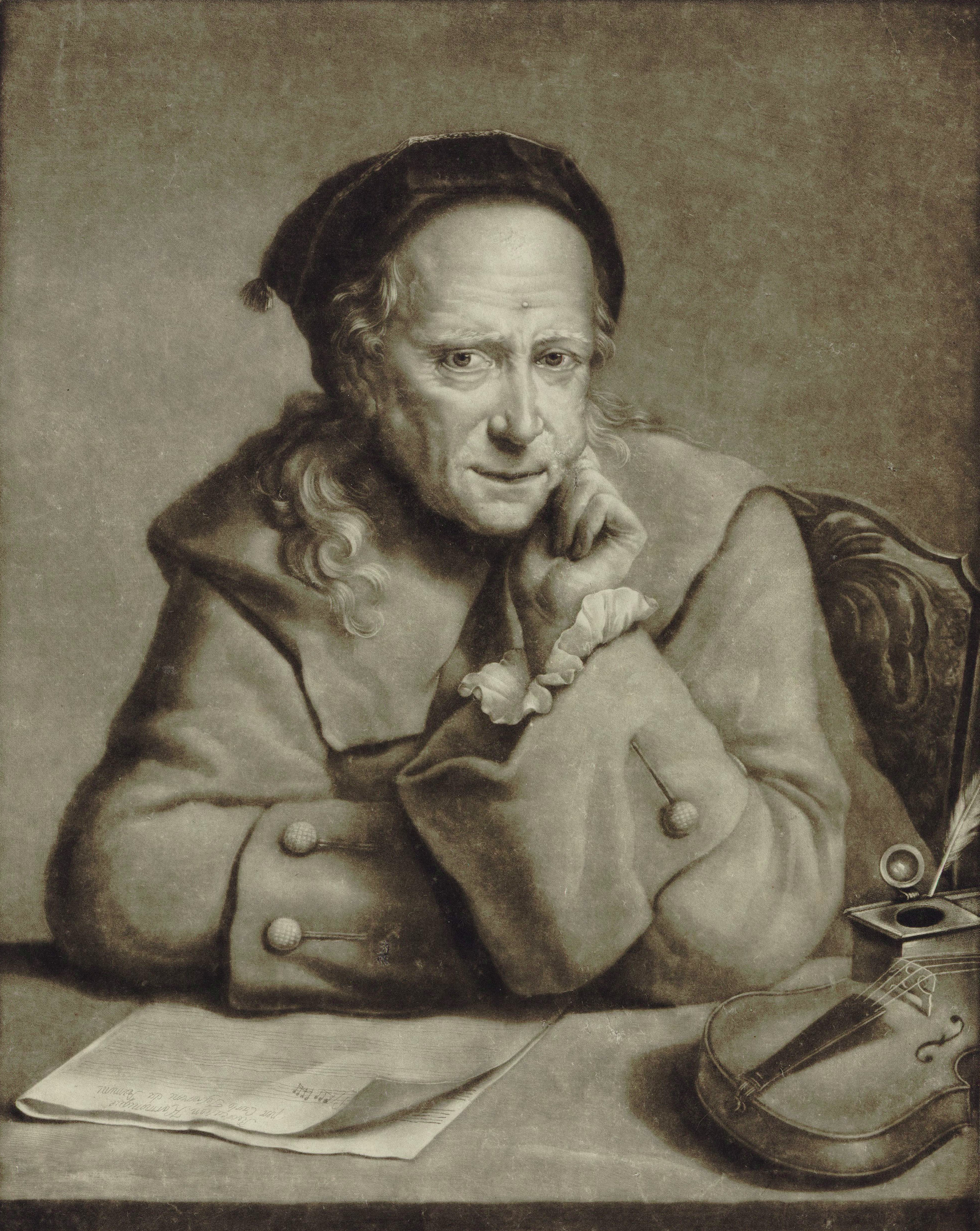
Carlo Tessarini by Jan Palthe.

Tessarini was born 1690 in Rimini and died in Amsterdam, Netherlands aged 76.

== Works ==
The publications authorized by the composer are indicated in bold font:

- op. 1 12 Concerti a cinque (London, 1724)
- **op. 1** 12 Sonate a violino e basso (Venice, 1729)
- op. 2 12 Sonate a flauto traversie e basso continuo (Amsterdam, 1732) (arrangement of the violin sonatas op. 1)
- **op. 2** Il Maestro e Discepolo, 6 Divertimenti da Camera a due violini (Urbino, 1734)
- op. 3 10 Concerti a più strumenti con violino obbligato (Amsterdam, 1732)
- op. 3 12 Sonate a Violino e Violone o Cembalo (Amsterdam, c.1736)
- **op. 3** 6 Allettamenti da camera a violino solo e violoncello (Rome, c.1740)
- **Gramatica di musica.** Insegna il modo facile e breve per bene impre di sonare il violino..... (Rome, 1741)
- op. 4 La stravaganza, divisa in quattro parti, e composta d’overture, di concerti, ob, di partite... (Amsterdam, 1735)
- **op. 4** 6 Trattimenti a violino e basso (Rome, 1742)
- **op. 5** 5 Sonata a tre da camera con due violini e basso con Canone al fine (Paris, 1743)
- **op. 6** 6 Trio a due violini e basso (Paris, 1744)
- op. 6 6 Sonate a violino e basso (Amsterdam, c.1747 - republished in Paris in 1763 without opus number)
- **op. 7** 6 Sinfonie a due violini e basso (Paris, c.1744)
- 6 Concerti à 5 con violino obligato (Paris, 1745)
- **op. 8** 6 Sonate a violini solo e basso (Paris, 1747)
- **op. 9** 6 Sonate da camera e chiesa a due violini e basso (Paris, 1747)
- Nouvelle méthode pour apprendre par théorie dans un mois de temps à jouer le violon, divisé en trois classes, avec des leçons à deux violons par gradation (Liège, 1750)
- **op. 10** Contrasto armonico a tre violini e basso con sui rinforzi (Paris, 1753) (1 Introduction + 3 Concertos)
- **op. 11** 12 Introducioni a 4 cioe due Violini, Alto Viola, Violoncelo e Basso, per il Cembalo (Paris, 1748)
- **op. 12** Sonate a due flauti traversier o sia due violini e basso (Paris, 1749)
- **op. 14** Sei sonate a violino ò flauto traversière e cembalo (Venice, 1748)
- **op. 15** Trattimento musicale sei duetti a due violini o pardesus de viole cenza basso (Paris, 1750)
- **op. 16** 6 Sonate a violino solo, violoncello e cimbalo (Paris, 1753)
- **op. 19** VI Grand Ouerture a IV cioe violino primo, violino secondo, alto viola, e basso (Paris, n.d.)
- **op. 20** VI Grand Sinfonie a IV cioe due violini alto viola e basso (Paris, n.d.) The title page mentions Son dernier ouvrage (his last work).
- L'Arte di nuova modulacione. Capricio musicale a VII partie (Paris, 1762)
- Pantomime a due violini o sia pardesus de viola o due violoncelli (Paris, 1763)
- Il piacier delle dame Facile ariete instrumentali, con violino, flauto traversier, pardesu de viola e basso (Paris, n.d.)
- Recueil harmonique de VI Grandes sinfonies à IV Parties, avec des cor de chasse ad libitum mis au jour par M.r Tessarini (Amsterdam, 1764)
