= 1744 in music =

== Events ==
- March 27 Johann Sebastian Bach revives his St Mark Passion with some textual changes and two new arias inserted at St. Thomas Church, Leipzig.
- Castrato Giovanni Carestini goes to work for Maria Theresa of Austria.

== Classical music ==
- Nicola Porpora
  - Laetatus sum (Psalm 121)
  - De profundis (Psalm 129)
  - Placida surge aurora
- Thomas Arne
  - The Death of Abel (oratorio)
  - Judith (first performed, published 1761)
- Johann Sebastian Bach – Das wohltemperierte Klavier, part 2
- Carl Philipp Emanuel Bach
  - Keyboard Sonata in E major, H.39
  - Harpsichord Concerto in F major, H.415
  - Harpsichord Concerto in E major, H.417
- Michele Blavet – Premier recueil de pieces
- Michael Christian Festing – 6 Violin Sonatas, Op.7
- Christoph Graupner
  - Trio Sonata in C minor, GWV 203
  - Trio Sonata in D major, GWV 204
  - Sonata in G major, GWV 212
  - Trio Sonata in B minor, GWV 219
  - Concerto for 2 Flutes in E minor, GWV 322
  - Concerto for 2 Horns in G major, GWV 332
  - Bassoon Concerto in B-flat major, GWV 340
- Johann Adolph Hasse – 6 Flute Sonatas, Op. 5
- Johann Ludwig Krebs
  - Clavier-Übung I, Krebs-WV 500-512
  - Clavier-Übung II, Krebs-WV 800
  - Clavier-Übung III, Krebs-WV 801-806
- Etienne Mangean – 6 Sonatas for 2 Violins, Op. 3
- Niccolò Pasquali – 6 Sonatas for Violin, Op. 1
- John Frederick Ranish – 12 Flute Sonatas, Op. 2
- Johan Helmich Roman – Drottningholm Music (Music for a Royal Wedding)
- Domenico Natale Sarro – Recorder Sonata in F major
- Georg Phillip Telemann – Jauchzet, ihr Himmel, TWV 1:957
- Francesco Maria Veracini
  - L'errore di Salomone (oratorio)
  - 12 Sonate accademiche, Op. 2 (for violin)
- Jan Dismas Zelenka
  - Litaniae Lauretanae, ZWV 151
  - Litaniae Lauretanae, ZWV 152

== Opera ==
- Daniele Dal Barba – Il Tigrane
- Christoph Willibald Gluck
  - La Sofonisba, Wq.5
  - Ipermestra, Wq. 7
- George Frideric Handel – Semele
- Johann Adolph Hasse
  - Antigono
  - Semiramide riconosciuta
- John Frederick Lampe – The Kiss Accepted and Returned

== Publications ==
- Carl Philipp Emanuel Bach – 6 Harpsichord Sonatas, Wq.49 (Nuremberg: Johann Ulrich Haffner) (composed 1742-44)
- Delphin Strungk (some copies were made in this year, though the composer died in 1694)
  - Lass mich dein sein und bleiben
  - Meine Seele erhebt den Herren

== Methods and theory writings ==
- Johan Daniel Berlin – Musicaliske Elementer (Trondheim: Jens Christ)

== Births ==
- May 3 – Friedrich Wilhelm Weis, composer
- May 4 – Marianna Martines, singer, pianist and composer (d. 1812)
- May 18 – Joseph Beer, composer and clarinetist (died 1812)
- May 19 – Queen Charlotte of Mecklenburg-Strelitz, regular patron of Mozart's (died 1818)
- August 4 – Julije Bajamonti (died 1800)
- August 25 – Johann Gottfried Herder, librettist and philosopher (died 1803)
- November 26 – Karl Siegmund von Seckendorff (died 1785)
- December 8 – Pierre-Joseph Candeille, French composer (died 1827)
- date unknown
  - Marie Barch, first native Danish ballerina (d. 1827)
  - Gaetano Brunetti, Italian composer (died 1798)
  - Francesco Petrini, composer and musician (died 1819)
  - Charles le Picq, French dancer and choreographer (d. 1806)

== Deaths ==
- January 14 – Charles-Hubert Gervais, composer (born 1671)
- January 20 – Richard Jones, violinist and composer
- February 15 – František Václav Míča, conductor and composer (born 1694)
- March 22 – Georg Lenck, German musician (born 1685)
- April 26 – Domenico Sarro, Italian composer (born 1679)
- May 9 – Johann Samuel Beyer (born 1669)
- May 30 – Alexander Pope, English poet (born 1688)
- June 29 – André Campra, composer (born 1660)
- August 19 – Carlo Arrigoni (born 1697)
- October 17 – Giuseppe Guarneri, violin-maker (born 1698)
- October 23 – Pierre-Charles Roy, librettist and poet (born 1683)
- October 31 – Leonardo Leo, composer (born 1694)
- December 29 – Pompeo Cannicciari (born 1670)
- date unknown
  - Claude Balon, dancer and choreographer
  - Gennaro Antonio Federico, Italian librettist
  - James Miller, librettist and playwright (born 1704)
  - Francesca Vanini-Boschi, operatic contralto
