= 1751 in music =

== Events ==
- 1751 is the year commonly given as the beginning of the classical era
- The "War of the Buffoons" (La Querelle des Bouffons), concerning the relative merits of French and Italian opera, divides Paris.
- Francesco Geminiani publishes "The Art of Playing on the Violin" in London.

== Classical music ==
- Charles Avison – 6 Concertos in 7 Parts, Op. 3
- Johann Sebastian Bach – Kunst der Fuge with appendix of Chorale prelude BWV 668a (posthumously)
- Charles Burney – 6 Cornet Pieces for Organ
- Armand-Louis Couperin – Les cacqueteuses, in his Pieces de Clavesin
- Antoine Dauvergne – Concerts de Simphonies
- Pierre-Claude Foucquet – Second Livre de Pièces de Clavecin
- Johann Adolphe Hasse
  - Mass in D minor
  - Oh Dio partir conviene
- Wilhelm Gommaar Kennis – 6 Trio Sonatas, Op. 2
- Niccolò Pasquali – Raccolta di overture, e symphonie... (London)
- Peter Pasqualino – 6 Cello Duets, Op. 2 (London: John Johnson)
- John Francis Wade – Cantus Diversi including Adeste Fideles ("O Come All Ye Faithful")

== Opera ==
- Pasquale Cafaro – Ipermestra
- Baldassare Galuppi – Antigona
- Carl Heinrich Graun
  - Britannico, GraunWV B:I:24
  - L'Armida GraunWV B:I:23, premiered Mar. 27 in Berlin
- Johann Adolf Hasse – Ciro Riconosciuto
- Joseph Haydn – Der Krumme Teufel (singspiel)
- Niccolò Jommelli – La villana nobile; Ifigenia in Aulide
- Jean-Philippe Rameau
  - Acante et Céphise
  - La Guirlande, RCT 42
- Giuseppe Sarti – Pompeo in Armenia
- Domingo Terradellas – Sesostri re d'Egitto

== Methods and theory writings ==
- William Hayes – The Art of Composing Music by a Method Entirely New
- Jacob Wilhelm Lustig – Inleiding tot de Muzykkunde
- Manuel de Moraes Pedroso – Compendio musico

== Births ==
- January 18 – Ferdinand Kauer, pianist and composer (died 1831)
- February 9 – Antoine Bullant, bassoonist and composer (died 1821)
- March 5 – Jan Křtitel Kuchař, composer
- March 29 – Supply Belcher, singer, composer and compiler of tune books (died 1836)
- July 30 – Maria Anna Mozart ("Nannerl"), Austrian musician and composer, sister of Wolfgang Amadeus Mozart (d. 1829)
- date unknown – Blas de Laserna, composer

== Deaths ==
- January 17 – Tomaso Giovanni Albinoni (born 1671)
- February 18 – Giuseppe Matteo Alberti, composer (born 1685)
- May 2 – Maria Maddalena Musi, Italian soprano (born 1669)
- May 20 – Domènec Terradellas, composer (born 1713)
- October 2 – Pierre Dumage, organist (born c. 1674)
- date unknown – Henry Reinhold, singer (born c. 1690)
