= Michel Corrette =

French composer, organist and author of musical method books (1707-1795)

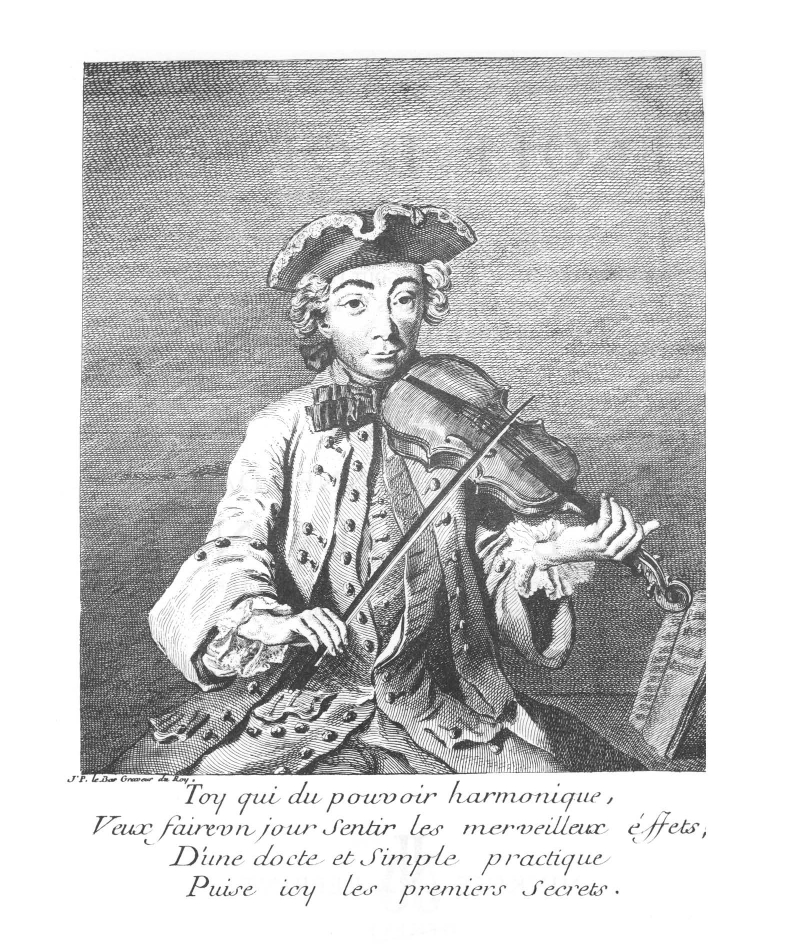
Michel Corrette

Michel Corrette (10 April 1707 – 21 January 1795) was a French composer, organist and author of musical method books.

== Life ==
Corrette’s father, Gaspard Corrette, was an organist and composer. Little is known of his early life.

In 1726, Corrette entered into a competition for the post of organist at the Church of Sainte Marie-Madeleine in Paris, but was not selected. He then earned his living as a music teacher (which in fact made him more money than he would have as an organist), and in 1727 he published his first collections of sonatas for various instruments such as the flute, violin, brass, musette, and hurdy-gurdy.

On 8 January 1733, Corrette married Marie-Catherine Morize, with whom he had two children, Marie-Anne (1734 - ca. 1822), and a son, Pierre-Michel (1744 - 1801), who also became an organist.

In 1737, Corrette was appointed as the organist at the Church of Sainte-Marie du Temple in Paris - a position he held for 54 years until 1791. In 1742, he wrote a so-called "Turkish" concerto in honour of the Ottoman Ambassador to France, Yirmisekizzade Mehmed Said Pasha, who was a great admirer of French culture. In addition to his post at the Sainte Marie Church, he served as organist at the Jesuit College in Paris from 1758 until his dismissal in 1762. It is also known, based on annotations in his methodic pieces for double bass, that he traveled to England before 1773. In 1780 he was appointed organist to the young Louis Antoine, Duke of Angoulême.

In 1791, he lost his longtime position at the Sainte-Marie Church after it was decommissioned during the French Revolution. (The church was sold to a private citizen and would be demolished several years later.) Despite this, he took a keen interest in the events taking place in his country, and wrote several musical paeans celebrating the Revolution, all now lost.

Michel Corrette died on 21 January 1795 in Paris, the city in which he spent almost all of his career, at the age of 87. A street in Rouen, his birthplace, bears his name.

== Music ==
Corrette was prolific. He composed ballets and divertissements for the stage, including Arlequin, Armide, Le Jugement de Midas, Les Âges, Nina, and Persée. He composed many concertos, notably 25 concertos comiques. Aside from these works and keyboard concertos, he also composed sonatas, songs, instrumental chamber works, harpsichord pieces, cantatas, and other sacred vocal works. Most of his sacred works have not survived, some exceptions being the Laudate Dominum and Four Masses for Two Voices from 1788.

Despite living well into the Classical era (he outlived Mozart by four years, dying in 1795 just a few months short of 88), Corrette's musical idiom was very conservative, and he continued to compose in the Baroque style at least up to the 1770s.

== His teaching ==
Aside from playing the organ and composing music, Corrette organized concerts and taught music. He wrote nearly twenty music method books for various instruments—the violin, cello, bass, flute, recorder, bassoon, harpsichord, harp, mandolin, voice and more—with titles such as l'Art de se perfectionner sur le violon (The Art of Playing the Violin Perfectly), le Parfait Maître à chanter (The Perfect Mastersinger) and L′école d′Orphée (The School of Orpheus), a violin treatise describing the French and Italian styles. These pedagogical works by Corrette are valuable because they "give lucid insight into contemporary playing techniques."

== List of works ==
=== Method books ===
- L'École d’Orphée, Méthode de violon dans le goût Français et Italien (1738; 1779 edition lost).
- Méthode de flûte (1740, retir. 1753, rééd. 1773).
- Méthode pour apprendre le violoncelle (1741, 1783)
- Méthode de par-dessus de viole à 5 et à 6 cordes avec des Leçons à I. et II. Parties (1748).
- Les Amusemens du Parnasse, Méthode courte et facile pour apprendre à toucher le clavecin (1749, 1779).
- Le Maître de clavecin pour l’accompagnement (1753, c. 1775, 1790).
- Prototipes contenant des leçons d’Accompagnement par demandes et par réponses (1754, 1762, 1775).
- Le Parfait Maître à chanter (Méthode de solfège chanté) (1758, 1782).
- Les Dons d’Apollon, méthode de guitare par musique et tablature (1762).
- Nouvelle méthode de mandoline (et tablature du cistre) (1772).
- Méthodes de contre-basse à 3, à 4, à 5 cordes, de la quinte ou alto et de la viole d’Orphée (1773).
- Méthode de harpe (1774), lost.
- La Gamme du hautbois et du basson (1776), lost.
- Méthode de quinte ou alto (1785), lost.
- L’Art de se perfectionner dans le violon (1782).
- La Belle Vielleuse, Méthode de vielle (1783, c.1825).
- Le Berger Galant, Méthode de flûte à bec (1784), lost.

=== Concertos ===
25 Concertos comiques :

1. Le Mirliton, ouvrage utile aux mélancoliques, 1732.
2. L'Allure, 1732.
3. Margoton, ouvrage récréatif.
4. Le Quadrille, 1733.
5. La femme est un grand embarras, 1733.
6. Le Plaisir des dames, 1733 (les 6 premiers concertos forment un recueil, Œuvre VIII "Ouvrage amusant et très récréatif").
7. La Servante au bon tabac, 1733.
8. Biron, 1734.
9. Les Tricotets, 1735.
10. Ma mie Margo, 1735.
11. La Tante Tourelourette et le Plaisir d'être avec vous, 1736.
12. La Découpure, 1737.
13. La Béquille du Père Barnaba, 1737.
14. La Choisy, 1741.
15. Concerto Turc, 1742.
16. Vla c'que c'est qu'd'aller aux bois, 1743.
17. Les Pantins, 1748.
18. La Tourière, 1748.
19. La Turque et la Confession, 1749-50.
20. Nous nous marierons dimanche, 1751.
21. Les Amours de Thérèse et de Colin, 1755.
22. La Prise de Port-Mahon, 1756, lost.
23. Ramponau, c. 1760. lost.
24. La Marche du Huron; Comme l'Amour, soyons enfants; On dit qu'à quinze ans, on plaît, on aime, on se marie, c.1773.
25. Les Sauvages et la Furstemberg, c.1773.

=== Other concertos ===
- for flute, violin, oboe
  - Œuvre III, 1728.
  - Œuvre IV, 1728.
- for hurdy-gurdy or musette
  - Le Berger Fortuné, 1737.
  - Les Récréations du Berger Fortuné, 1737.
  - Les Voyages du Berger Fortuné aux Indes Orientales, 1737.
  - L'Asne dort, 1740.
- for organ or harpsichord:
  - VI Concerti a sei Strumenti, Cimbalo o Organo obligati, Opera XXVI, 1756.
- for cello :
  - Le Phenix, concerto pour quatre Violoncelles, Violes ou Bassons, c. 1735.
- works written for Christmas
1. Concerto Spirituel, 1731.
2. Pastorale, 1732.
3. III Concerto de Noëls, 1735.
4. Noëls Suisses, 1737.
5. Noël Allemand "Lobt Gott, ihr Christen, alle gleich", 1741.
6. Concerto de noëls, 1754, lost.

=== Orchestral ===
- Les Ages. Ballet Pantomime, œuvre X (28 juillet 1733)
- Concert de Simphonies, œuvre XV, incomplet, 1735.
- Six Symphonies en Quatuor sur les Noëls, 1762
- Carillon, ajouté à la Messe des Morts de Jean Gilles, 1764.

=== Instrumental ===
==== Harpsichord ====
- Premier Livre de Pièces de clavecin, Œuvre, 1734.
- Livre de sonates pour le clavecin avec accompagnement de violon, Opera XXV, 1742.
- Livre I. Les Amusemens du Parnasse. Méthode courte et facile pour apprendre à toucher le Clavecin, avec les plus jolis airs à la mode, où les doigts sont chiffrés pour les Commençans, 1749.
- Livre II. Les Amusemens du Parnasse, Brunettes et les plus jolis airs à la mode avec des variations, c. 1752.
- Livre III des Amusemens du Parnasse, contenant les belles Ariettes Italiennes qui ont été chantées au Concert Spirituel et à l'Opéra Italien, mises en pièces de clavecin, 1754.
- Livre IV des Amusements du Parnasse, contenant les Belles Arietes Italiennes, Chansons, Menuets, et autres jolis airs, le tout ajusté pour le Clavecin, 1762.
- Livre V des Amusements du Parnasse, contenant des ariettes de l'opéra-comique et autres jolis airs. Le tout arrangé pour le clavecin, 1769, lost.
- Livre VI des Amusemens du Parnasse, contenant la Marche des Gardes Françaises et celle des Gardes Suisses, avec des Ariettes choisies accommodées pour le clavecin, 1769.
- Livre VII des Amusemens du Parnasse, contenant des Ariettes choisies, Marches, Menuets et Romances avec des variations pour le clavecin. Plusieurs de ces pièces peuvent se jouer sur la harpe, 1771, lost.
- Livre VIII des Amusemens du Parnasse, contenant des Ariettes Italiennes Romances avec des variations accommodées pour le clavecin. Ces Marches font un bel effet sur les Grands Jeux de l'orgue, 1772.
- Divertissements pour le clavecin ou le forte piano, avec le Combat naval, 1779.

==== Organ ====
- Premier Livre d'orgue (Magnificat tons 1-4), 1737.
- IIe Livre d'Orgue. Œuvre XXVI (sic) (Magnificat tons 5-8), 1750.
- Nouveau Livre de Noëls avec un Carillon pour le Clavecin ou l'Orgue (1741, rééd. 1753).
- IIIe Livre d'Orgue contenant les messes et les hymnes de l'Église.., 1756.
- XII Offertoires: I. La St. Augustin - II. La St. Benoist - III. La St. Louis - IV. La St. Bernard - V. La St. Dominique - VI. La S. Pierre S. Paul - VII. La St. François - VIII. La saint Jean - IX. La Ste. Cécile (in part) - X. ? (lost) - XI. ? (in part) - XII. La Renommée. (1766). These Offertories, once considered lost, have been recently rediscovered and are in the possession of the Bibliothèque nationale de France.
- Noëls avec des variations, l'O Filii et un Carillon... qui peuvent s'exécuter sur l'orgue et le piano-forte, 1782, lost.
- Pièces pour l'orgue dans un genre nouveau... avec le mélange des jeux et la manière d'imiter le tonnerre, 1787.

==== Flute, Violin ====
- Sonates pour violon et basse continüe. Œuvre I, 1727, lost.
- Sonates pour 2 flûtes traversières sans basse. Œuvre II, 1727; rééd. 1740.
- Menuets dans le goût français et italien pour les flûtes, hautbois et violons avec la basse continüe, 1733.
- Sonates pour la flûte traversière ou violon avec la basse continue composée pour le violon de Chelle ou basson, Opera XIII, 1734.
- Sonates en trio pour la flûte traversière et violon avec la basse continue. Opera XIV, c. 1735.
- Menuets nouveaux pour le violon avec la basse pour le violoncelle, viole et basson, exécutés à la Comédie Française par la Nouvelle Orchestre, 1736-37.
- Trois livres de contredanses, 1742, lost.
- Sonatilles, solo pour la flûte traversière ou violon avec la basse. Œuvre XIX, 1739.
- Trois Livres de Duos pour la flûte. Œuvre 21, 22 & 23, 1740, lost.
- VI Duetti a due Violini o a flauti traversi, Opera XXIIIa, 1740.
- Les plus beaux vaudevilles, chansons, et contredanses anglaises accommodés pour deux flûtes ou violons, 1740, lost.

==== Cello ====
- Les Délices de la Solitude, sonates pour le violoncelle, viole, basson avec la basse continüe chiffrée. Œuvre XX, 1738-9.
- Noël pour deux violoncelles et basse, 1781, lost.

==== Musette, hurdy-gurdy ====
- Pièces pour la musette ou vièle, flûte à bec, flûte traversière, hautbois, dessus de viole et violon. Œuvre V, 1729.
- Six fantaisies à trois parties pour la vièle ou musette, flûte et basse continue. Œuvre VI, 1729.

==== Horn or Trumpet ====
- Divertissemens pour deux cors de chasse ou trompettes. Œuvre Septième, c. 1730, Rééd., c. 1737.
- Tons de chasse et fanfares pour le cor de chasse, lost.
- Divertissement pour cor, 1764, lost.

=== For voice ===
- for the Opéra Comique
  - Recueil des Divertissements de l'Opéra Comique... Foire Saint Laurent. Œuvre IX^{e}, 1733.
  - II^{e} Recueil de l'Opéra Comique...Foire Saint Germain. Œuvre XI^{e}, 1734.
  - Troisième Livre d'Airs à chanter. Œuvre XVII^{e}, 1735-1736, lost.
  - Quatrième Livre d'Airs à chanter. Œuvre XIX, 1737; titre remplacé par Les Délassemens de l'esprit. Vaudevilles et Ariettes de l'Opéra Comique. Tome I, 1737.
  - Les Délassemens de l'Esprit. Tome II, 1738.
  - Les Délassemens de l'esprit. Tome III, 1742, lost.
  - Les Délassemens. Tome IV, 1754-1758.
- Ariettas, Cantatas, Cantatilles, Vaudevilles:
  - Jeanne, Cantatille avec symphonie, 1738.
  - Vaudeville au sujet de l'Alliance de Madame de France et Philippe II, infant d'Espagne, 1739.
  - La Naissance de la Musette, IIe Cantatille avec Symphonie, 1743.
  - Epouvante tes bords. Air de Basse-Taille. In: Mercure de France, avril 1744.
  - Le Retour du Roy, Cantatille, c. 1742-1748.
  - Je n'avais jamais engagé mon cœur, c. 1755.
  - Epithalame à l'occasion du mariage de Monseigneur le Comte de Marche avec Mademoiselle d'Este, 1759 (ms.).
  - Polymnie, Cantatille, avec Simphonie dans laquelle il y a un violoncelle obligé, 1760.
  - Malbrough, Ariette Nouvelle à voix seule, 1783.
- Works commemorating the French Revolution, all lost
  - Ariette patriotique sur le refrain : « Ah, ça ira, ça ira, ça ira », 1790.
  - Chaconne du Tiers-État, 1790.
  - Le Triomphe de la Garde Nationale, contenant 2 Ariettes militaires que l'on peut chanter en Duo, avec violons, cors de chasse et basse, 1790.
- Sacred works for voice
  - Laudate pueri Dominum, Psaume, 1745, lost.
  - Levavi oculos, motet à grand Chœur, 1745, lost.
  - Lauda Jerusalem, motet à Grand Chœur, 1748, lost.
  - Te Deum, 1752, lost.
  - Laudate Dominum de cælis. Psaume 148. Motet à grand chœur arrangé dans le concert du Printemps de Vivaldi, 22 novembre 1765.
  - Messe avec symphonie à grand chœur et Ecce quam bonum, motet, 22 novembre 1769, lost.
  - Motets à voix seule avec accompagnement pour l'orgue à l'usage des dames religieuses, 1775, lost.
  - Leçons de Ténèbres à voix seule avec accompagnement de l'orgue, pour le premier de chaque jour, le Mercredi, le Jeudi et le Vendredi Saint, 1784.
  - Quatre Messes à deux voix égales. Avec l’accompagnement de l’Orgue à l’usage des Dames Religieuses mêlées de Solo, Duo et Chœurs qui peuvent aussi se chanter par les haute-contres et tailles, (1788).
    - IVe Messe pour le tems de Noël, pour deux dessus et orgue.

== See also ==
- French baroque harpsichordists
- French organ school
