= Jean Elleviou =

French opera singer (1769–1842)

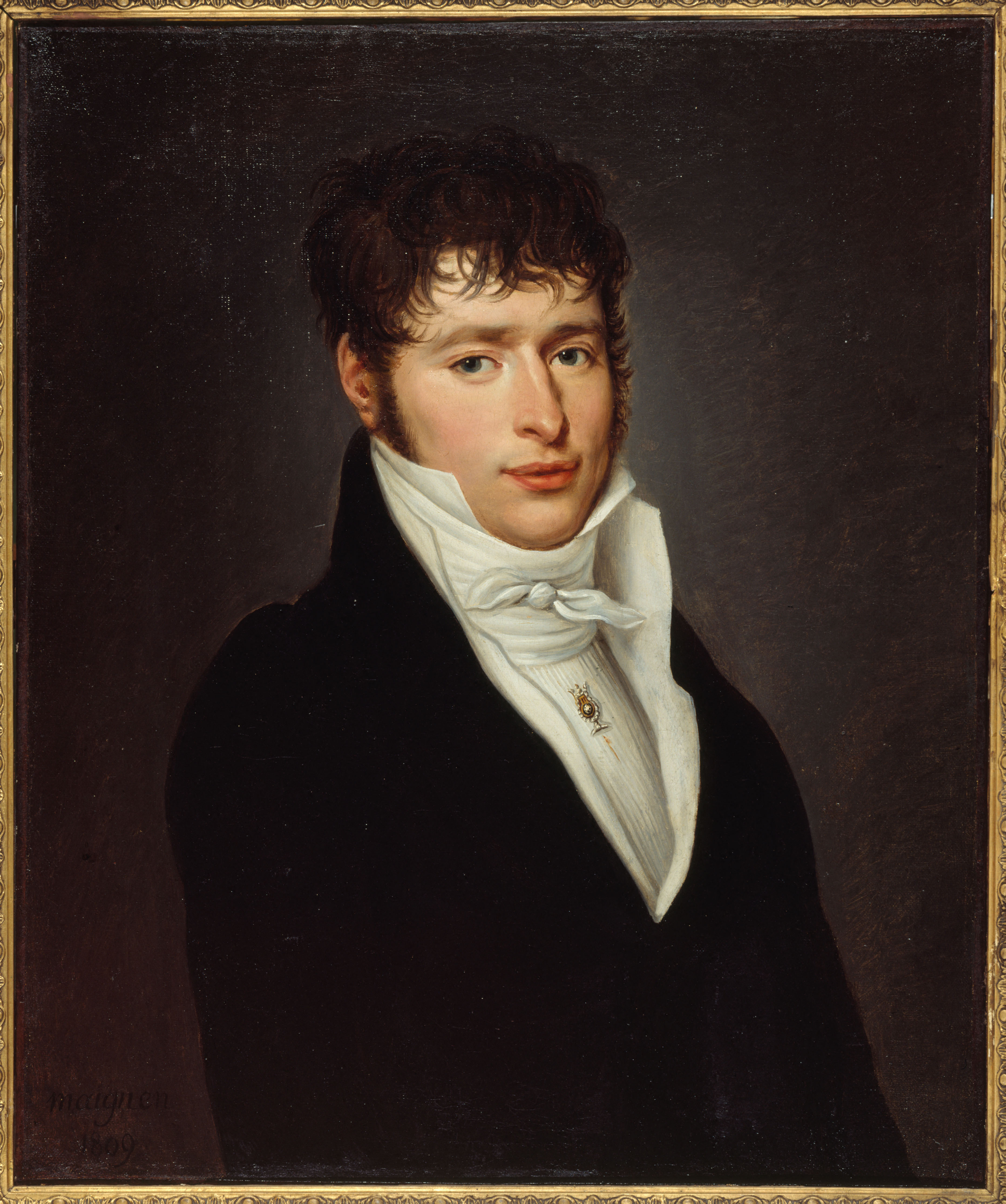
Jean Elleviou in 1809 (musée Carnavalet).

Jean Elleviou (14 June 1769 in Rennes – 5 May 1842 in Paris) was a French operatic tenor, one of the most celebrated French singers of his time.

Born Pierre-Jean-Baptiste-François Elleviou, he made his debut at the Comédie-Italienne in Paris in 1790, as a baritone in the role of Alexis in Monsigny's Le déserteur, and the following year as a tenor in Dalayrac's Philippe et Georgette.

He went on creating some 40 roles during the next 20 years, in operas by Grétry, Dalayrac, Monsigny, Boieldieu, Méhul, Isouard, etc. His repertory also included Azor in Zémire et Azor, Blondel in Richard Coeur-de-lion, Almaviva in Paisiello's Il barbiere di Siviglia.

He sang extensively in Italy in 1795, and across France in 1795 to 1797, then returned to Paris, appearing at the newly renamed Opéra-Comique. He retired in 1813, after Napoléon I refused to increase his already huge salary.

According to contemporaries, his voice was very sweet and flexible, he was noted for his eloquent diction, and had a handsome and charming stage presence which made him a great favourite of Paris audiences.

== Repertoire ==
- Le déserteur by Monsigny, libretto by Sedaine (reprise salle Favart, 19 April 1790) : Alexis
- Sylvain, music by André Grétry, libretto by Jean-François Marmontel (reprise salle Favart) : Sylvain
- Philippe et Georgette, music by Nicolas Dalayrac, libretto by Jacques-Marie Boutet de Monvel (created salle Favart, 28 December 1791) : Philippe
- Paul et Virginie, music by Rodolphe Kreutzer, libretto by Edmond-Guillaume-François de Favières (reprise salle Favart, 15 January 1791) : Zabis
- Camille ou le Souterrain, music by Dalayrac, libretto by Marsollier (created salle Favart, 19 March 1791) : Lorédan
- Tout pour l'amour ou Roméo et Juliette, music by Dalayrac, libretto by Jacques-Marie Boutet de Monvel (created salle Favart, 7 July 1792) : Théobald
- Cécile et Julien ou le Siège de Lille, music by Trial fils, libretto by Joigny (created salle Favart, 21 November 1792) : an emigrant
- Azémia ou le Nouveau Robinson, music by Dalayrac, libretto by Auguste-Etienne-Xavier Poisson de la Chabeaussière (reprise salle Favart) : Prosper
- La Prise de Toulon par les Français, music by Auguste Lemière de Corvey, libretto by Alexandre Duval (created salle Favart, le 21) : Armand
- L'Oncle valet, music by Domenico Della Maria, libretto by Alexandre Duval (created salle Favart, 8 December 1798) : Florval
- Adolphe et Clara ou les Deux Prisonniers, music by Nicolas Dalayrac, libretto by Benoît-Joseph Marsollier (creation salle Favart, 10 February 1799) : Adolphe
- Le Trente et quarante ou le Portrait, music by Angelo Tarchi, libretto by Alexandre Duval (created salle Favart, 6 May 1799) : Valcour
- Camille ou le Souterrain, music by Dalayrac, libretto by Marsollier (reprise salle Favart) : Alberti
- Beniowski ou les Éxiles du Kamtschatka, music by Boieldieu, libretto by Alexandre Duval (created salle Favart, 8 June 1800) : Valcour
- Le Calife de Bagdad, music by Boieldieu, libretto by Saint-Just (created salle Favart, 16 September 1800) : Isauun
- Maison à vendre, music by Dalayrac, libretto by Alexandre Duval (created salle Favart, 23 October 1800) : Versac
- L'Irato ou l'Emporté, music by Étienne Nicolas Méhul, libretto by Marsollier (création salle Favart, 17 February 1801) : Lysandre
- Paul et Virginie, music by Rodolphe Kreutzer, livret d'Edmond de Favières (reprise théâtre Feydeau, le 24) : Paul
- Zémire et Azor, music by Grétry, libretto by Marmontel (reprise théâtre Feydeau, 17 May 1802)
- Pierre le Grand, music by Grétry, libretto by Jean-Nicolas Bouilly (reprise Théâtre Feydeau, 21 July 1802) : Pierre
- Picaros et Diego ou la Folle Soirée, music by Dalayrac, libretto by Emmanuel Dupaty (created théâtre Feydeau, 3 May 1803)
- L’Ami de la maison, music by Grétry, libretto by Jean-François Marmontel (reprise Théâtre Feydeau, 15 September 1804)
- Richard Cœur-de-Lion, music by Grétry, libretto by Sedaine (reprise Théâtre Feydeau, 20 March 1806)
- Le Roy et le Fermier de Monsigny, libretto by Sedaine (reprise Théâtre Feydeau 23 October 1806)
- Joseph by Méhul, libretto by Alexandre Duval (created Théâtre Feydeau 17 February 1807) : Joseph
- Jean de Paris, music by Boieldieu, libretto by Saint-Just (created Théâtre Feydeau 4 April 1812) : Jean de Paris

== Sources ==
- Le guide de l'opéra, Mancini & Rouveroux, (Fayard, 1986) ISBN 2-213-01563-5
- Ferdinand Hoefer, Nouvelle Biographie générale, t. 7, Firmin-Didot, Paris, 1857, p. 212-213.
- Arthur Pougin, Figures d’opéra-comique, Tresse, Paris, 1875, p. 77-141 (Read online on Internet Archive); rééd. Symétrie, Lyon, 2012 (ISBN 978-2-914373-87-6).
- Joël-Marie Fauquet, « Jean Elleviou » in Dictionnaire de la musique en France au XIXe siècle, Fayard, Paris, 2003 ISBN 978-2-213-59316-6
- Raphaëlle Legrand, Nicole Wild, Regards sur l'Opéra-Comique : Trois siècles de vie théâtrale, coll. « Sciences de la musique », CNRS éditions, Paris, 2002. ISBN 2-271-05885-6.
- Nicole Wild, David Charlton, Théâtre de l'Opéra-Comique, Paris : Répertoire 1762-1972, coll. Musique/musicologie, Mardaga, Liège, 2005 ISBN 2-87009-898-7.
