= 1799 in music =

List of years in music	(table)
- … 1789; 1790; 1791; 1792; 1793; 1794; 1795; 1796; 1797; 1798; 1799; 1800; 1801; 1802; 1803; 1804; 1805; 1806; 1807; 1808; 1809 …
- Art; Archaeology; Architecture; Literature; Music; Philosophy; Science; +...

== Events ==
- Swiss composer Jean Baptiste Édouard Du Puy is dismissed by King Gustav IV of Sweden for praising Napoleon.

== Classical music ==
- Ludwig van Beethoven – Piano Sonata in C Minor, Op. 13 ("Pathétique"); Piano Sonatas Nos. 9 and 10 (Op. 14, No. 1 and 2)
- Benjamin Carr – Dead March and Monody
- Joseph Haydn – String Quartets Op. 77
- Antonio Salieri – "Der Tyroler Landsturm", secular cantata for soprano, alto, tenor, bass, double choir, orchestra and speaker
- Giovanni Paisiello – Sinfonia Funèbre
- Louis Spohr – Violin Concerto in G major, WoO 9

== Opera ==
- Étienne Méhul – Adrien, Ariodant
- Ferdinando Paer – La Camila ossia il Sotteraneo
- Antonio Salieri – Falstaff o sia Le tre burle

== Births ==
- February 25 – Siegfried Wilhelm Dehn, music theorist (died 1858)
- March 21 – Charles Mayer, pianist and composer (died 1862)
- April 13 – Ludwig Rellstab, critic (died 1860)
- May 26 – Alexander Sergeyevich Pushkin, novelist and lyricist (died 1837)
- May 27 – Fromental Halévy, composer (died 1862)
- May 30 – Ferdo Livadić, nationalist composer (died 1879)
- June 13 – Henri Brod, oboist, instrument builder and composer (died 1839)
- September 11 – Giuseppe Persiani, opera composer (died 1869)
- October 31 – Maria Fredrica von Stedingk composer (died 1868)
- December 31 – Thomas Täglichsbeck, violinist and composer (died 1867)

== Deaths ==
- March 28 – Bendix Friedrich Zinck I, composer (born 1715)
- April 1 – Narcís Casanoves i Bertran, composer (born 1747)
- April 28 – François Giroust, composer, 62
- May 2 – Henri-Joseph Rigel, composer, 58
- May 9 – Claude Balbastre, organist, harpsichordist and composer, 74
- June 10 – Chevalier de Saint-Georges, composer and violinist, 53
- June 18 – Johann Andre, composer (born 1741)
- August 16 – Vincenzo Manfredini, composer, 61
- September 20 – Polly Young, soprano, composer and keyboard player, 50
- October 16 – Antoine-Frédéric Gresnick, composer, 44
- October 24 – Carl Ditters von Dittersdorf, composer, 59
- date unknown
  - Narciso Casanovas, composer (born 1747)
  - Marija Zubova, composer (born 1749)
