= 1798 in music =

List of years in music	(table)
- … 1788; 1789; 1790; 1791; 1792; 1793; 1794; 1795; 1796; 1797; 1798; 1799; 1800; 1801; 1802; 1803; 1804; 1805; 1806; 1807; 1808 …
- Art; Archaeology; Architecture; Literature; Music; Philosophy; Science; +...

== Events ==
- July 11 – United States Marine Band established by Act of Congress.
- September 2 – Opening of the Teatro Comunale (Ferrara) in Italy with a performance of Portogallo's Gli Orazi e i Curiazi.
- Opening of the Teatro della Concordia in Iesi, Ancona, "one of the few opera houses in Italy from the late 1700s that has never been destroyed by fire or bombs".
- Completion of the first São João National Theatre in Porto, Portugal as an opera house.
- Michael Haydn takes on Carl Maria von Weber as a pupil without charge.
- First edition of Niemetschek's biography of Mozart published.

== Classical music ==
- Ludwig van Beethoven – Piano Sonata No. 8 in C minor, Op. 13 (Sonata Pathétique)
- Joseph Eybler – Clarinet Concerto in B-flat major
- Joseph Haydn
  - The Creation
  - Missa in Angustiis
- Leopold Kozeluch – Sinfonia Concertante in E-flat major
- Paul Wranitzky – Grande Sinfonie caracteristique in C minor, Op. 31

== Published popular music ==
- Edward Jones (Bardd y Brenin) – Popular Cheshire Melodies

== Births ==
- January 31 – Carl Gottlieb Reissiger, kapellmeister and composer (d. 1859)
- March 9 – Mathilda Berwald, Hovsångare (d. 1877)
- October 28 – Henri Bertini, pianist and composer (d. 1876)
- date unknown
  - Andrea Maffei, librettist (d. 1885)
  - Louis-Désiré Véron, opera manager (d. 1867)
  - Lovisa Charlotta Borgman, violinist (d. 1884)

== Deaths ==
- January 4 – Giuseppe Giordani, opera composer (b. 1751)
- January 20 – Christian Cannabich, composer (b. 1731)
- January 28 – Christian Gottlob Neefe, composer and conductor (b. 1748)
- July 15 – Gaetano Pugnani, violinist (b. 1731)
- November 30 – Friedrich Fleischmann, composer (b. 1766)
- December 16 – Gaetano Brunetti, composer (b. 1744)
