= 1802 in music =

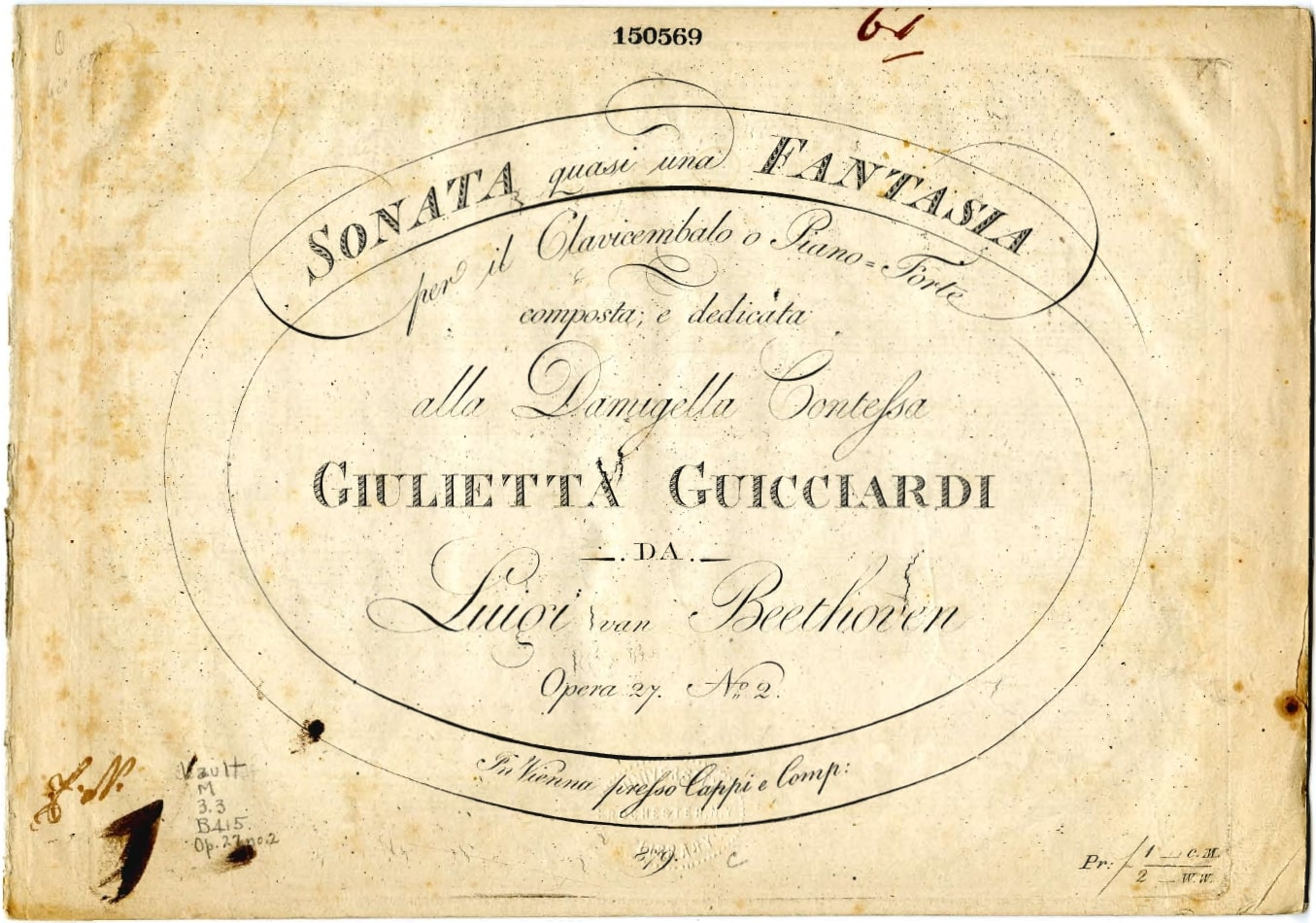
Beethoven’s Piano Sonata 14, published in 1802.

This is a list of music-related events in 1802.

== Events ==
- January 9 – The Harmonic Society of Philadelphia is founded, with native composer Andrew Law as its president.
- January 20 – Luigi Boccherini receives a pension from Joseph Bonaparte.
- February 15 – Muzio Clementi publishes the second volume of his Practical Harmony.
- March 19 – Composer François-Adrien Boieldieu marries dancer Clotilde Mafleuray.
- April 30 – Louis Spohr begins his violin studies under Franz Eck.
- May 5
  - Composer Giovanni Paisiello, recently arrived in Paris, meets his host, Napoleon, for the first time.
  - Composers Jan Ladislav Dussek and Louis Spohr are introduced by Herr Kiekhöver in Hamburg.
- July 20 – The chapel created by Napoleon in the Tuileries is officially opened, with Giovanni Paisiello as its musical director.
- August 15 – Luigi Cherubini, Étienne-Nicolas Méhul, François-Adrien Boieldieu, Rodolphe Kreutzer, Pierre Rode and Nicolò Isouard go into business as publishers of their own music.
- October 6 – Ludwig van Beethoven writes to his brother Carl from Heiligenstadt, in despair over his increasing deafness.
- Simon Mayr becomes maestro di cappella at Bergamo Cathedral.

== Publications ==
- Charles-Simon Catel – Traité d’harmonie (Paris: l'Imprimerie du Conservatoire de Musique)
- Frédéric Duvernoy – Méthod pour le Cor (Mme Le Roi, Imprimerie du Conservatoire de Musique)
- Johann Nikolaus Forkel – On Johann Sebastian Bach’s Life, Art, and Work: For Patriotic Admirers of True Musical Art (Leipzig: Hoffmeister und Kühnel)
- John Gunn – An Essay Theoretical and Practical (London: Preston, for the author)
- Christian Kalkbrenner – Histoire de la Musique (Paris: Amand Kœnig)
- Heinrich Christoph Koch – Musikalisches Lexikon (Frankfurt am Main: August Hermann der Jüngere)
- Jean-Xavier Lefèvre – Méthode de clarinette (Paris: Imprimerie du Conservatoire de Musique)
- Georg Joseph Vogler – Handbuch zur Harmonielehre (Prague: K. Barth)

== Classical music ==
- Ludwig van Beethoven
  - Second Symphony
  - 6 Ländler, WoO 15
  - Bagatelle in C Major, WoO 54
  - "No, Non Tubarti", WoO 92a
  - "Ne' giorni tuoi felici", WoO 93
  - "Graf, Graf, Liebster Graf" WoO 101
  - Piano Sonata No. 16
  - Piano Sonata No. 17
  - Piano Sonata No. 18
  - 3 Piano Sonatas, Op. 31
  - 6 Variations in F Major, Op. 34
  - Eroica Variations, Op. 35
- Matthieu Frédéric Blasius – Clarinet Concerto No. 1
- Giuseppe Maria Cambini – Wind Quintet Nos.1–3
- Muzio Clementi – 3 Piano Sonatas, Op. 40
- Jan Ladislav Dussek
  - Duo in F major, Op. 26
  - Piano Sonata No.17, Op. 43
  - Piano Sonatas Nos. 19–21, Op. 45
  - Piano Sonatas Nos. 22–23, Op. 47
- Emanuel Aloys Förster – 3 String Quartets, Op. 21
- Joseph Haydn – Harmoniemesse, his last major work
- Johann Nepomuk Hummel – Piano Quintet for piano, violin, viola, cello and bass, Op. 87 (inspiration for Schubert's "Trout" quintet)
- Franz Krommer
  - Flute Concerto No.1, Op. 30
  - Concerto for 2 Clarinets in E-flat major, Op. 35
- Ignaz Pleyel – Symphonie concertante in F major, B.115
- Johann Friedrich Reichardt – Das Zauberschloss (singspiel)
- Louis Spohr - Violin Concerto No. 1, Op. 1
- Anton Ferdinand Titz – 3 String Quartets
- Samuel Wesley – Symphony in B-flat
- Carl Friedrich Zelter – Sammlung kleiner Balladen und Lieder, Z.123

== Opera ==
- Charles-Simon Catel – Sémiramis
- Michael Kelly – Urania
- Giovanni Simone Mayr – I misteri eleusini (premiered Jan. 6 in Milan)
- Etienne Nicolas Méhul – Le trésor supposé
- William Reeve – Family Quarrels (comic opera)
- Carl Maria von Weber – Peter Schmoll und seine Nachbarn

== Births ==
- February 7 – Johann Nepomuk Vogl, lyricist (died 1866)
- February 20 – Charles-Auguste de Bériot, composer and violinist (died 1870)
- February 25 – Georg Scheurlin, music publisher (died 1872)
- February 26 – Victor Hugo, librettist and poet (died 1885)
- March 3 – Adolphe Nourrit, operatic tenor (died 1839)
- March 5 – James Turle, editor and organist (died 1882)
- May 31
  - Eduard Grund, composer (died 1871)
  - Cesare Pugni, Italian composer (died 1870)
- July 3 – Joseph Labitzky, composer and conductor (died 1881)
- July 12 – Charles-Louis-Joseph Hanssens, composer (died 1852)
- July 15 – John Barnett, English composer (died 1890)
- July 24 – Alexandre Dumas, librettist and writer (died 1870)
- July 27 – Ida Henriette da Fonseca, alto, composer (died 1858)
- August 13 – Nikolaus Lenau, lyricist and poet (died 1850)
- August 23 – Manuel Inocêncio Liberato dos Santos, musician and composer (died 1887)
- August 28 – Karl Joseph Simrock, librettist and poet (died 1876)
- September 18 – Jean-Amédée Lefroid de Méreaux, composer (died 1874)
- September 19 – Lajos Kossuth, dedicatee and politician (died 1894)
- September 24 – Alexander James Edmund Cockburn, librettist and Lord Chief Justice (died 1880)
- October 7 – Bernhard Molique, composer (died 1869)
- October 10 – George Pope Morris, librettist and publisher (died 1864)
- date unknown
  - Jean-Baptiste Duvernoy, pianist and composer (died c. 1880)
  - Ureli Corelli Hill, conductor (died 1875)
  - George Alexander Lee, singer and composer (died 1851)
  - Marion Dix Sullivan, American composer (died 1860)
  - José Zapiola, conductor and composer (died 1885)

== Deaths ==
- January 27 – Johann Rudolf Zumsteeg, conductor and composer, 42
- March 7 – Johann Georg Witthauer, composer, 51
- April 10 – Charlotte Brent, operatic soprano, 67
- April 18 – Erasmus Darwin, lyricist and physician (born 1731)
- July 26 – Rose-Adélaïde Ducreux, painter and musician, 41 (yellow fever)
- July 28 – Giuseppe Sarti, composer, 72
- August 10 – Antonio Lolli, violinist and composer (born c. 1725)
- August 23 – Corona Schröter, singer, 51
- September 28 – Heinrich Harries, lyricist and pastor (born 1762)
- October 2 – Giuseppe Millico, castrato singer, composer and music teacher, 65
- October 22 – Samuel Arnold, composer and organist, 62
