= 1800 in music =

This is a list of music-related events in 1800.

== Events ==
- January 16 – Luigi Cherubini's opera, Les Deux Journées ("The Water Carrier"), is premièred in Paris at the Salle Feydeau.
- February 22 – Lorenzo da Ponte, best known as Mozart's former librettist, goes bankrupt in London; his partner in the publishing business, Jan Ladislav Dussek, has already gone into hiding.
- March 28 – Anton Weidinger gives the first public performance of Haydn's Trumpet Concerto in E flat major at the Vienna Burgtheater.
- April 2 – Beethoven's Symphony No. 1 debuts at the Burgtheater in Vienna.
- April 21 – Haydn's Creation is performed in London. In the interval, Samuel Wesley plays one of his own organ concertos.
- June 2 – The premiere of Cesare in Farmacusa, with music by Antonio Salieri and words by Carlo Prospero Defranceschi, takes place at the Kärntnertortheater, Vienna.
- September 6 – During Lord Nelson's visit to Eisenstadt, his companion Emma, Lady Hamilton, performs Haydn's Arianna a Naxos and The Battle of the Nile, with Haydn himself on piano.
- September 16 – François-Adrien Boïeldieu's opera, Le calife de Bagdad, opens at Paris's Salle Favart.
- October 8 – Prince Joseph Franz von Lobkowitz pays Ludwig van Beethoven 200 florins for his String Quartets.
- October 14 – Nine-year-old prodigy Jakob Meyer Beer makes his début on the concert platform, playing a Mozart piano concerto; Jakob later reinvents himself as Giacomo Meyerbeer.
- December 1 – Franz Anton Hoffmeister and Ambrosius Kühnel establish the Bureau de Musique, a music publishing company, in Leipzig.

== Classical music ==
- Ludwig van Beethoven
  - Symphony No. 1
  - Piano Concerto No. 3 (composed; first performance in 1803)
  - Piano Sonata in B-flat Major Op. 22
  - Piano Sonata in A-flat Major Op. 26
- François Adrien Boieldieu – Harp concerto in C Major
- Bartolomeo Campagnoli – 6 Fugues for Solo Violin, Op. 10
- Adelaide Suzanne Camille Delaval – Prelude, Divertimento and Waltz, Op. 3
- Jan Ladislav Dussek – Piano Sonata No.18, Op. 44
- Giacomo Gotifredo Ferrari – 3 Trio Sonatas, Op. 25
- Adalbert Gyrowetz – Divertissement, Op. 50
- Louis-Emmanuel Jadin – 3 String Quartets, Livre 1
- Leopold Kozeluch – Three Grand Sonatas for piano accompanied by violin and cello
- Franz Krommer – 3 String Quartets, Op. 18
- Wenzel Thomas Matiegka – Fantaisie in C major, Op. 4
- Johann Friedrich Reichardt – Der Jubel oder Juchhei (liederspiel)
- Carl Maria von Weber – 6 Variations sur un thème original, Op. 2 1832

== Opera ==
- François Adrien Boieldieu – Le Calife de Bagdad
- Luigi Cherubini – Les deux journées
- Ferdinando Paer – La testa riscaldata, La sonnambula, Ginevra degli Almieri and Poche ma buone
- William Reeve – Paul and Virginia
- Antonio Salieri – Cesare in Farmacusa and L'Angiolina
- Carl Maria von Weber – Das stumme Waldmädchen

== Methods and theory writings ==
- Anton Bemetzrieder – A Complete Treatise on Music (London: Thomas Rickaby)
- Johann Dalberg – Untersuchungen über den Ursprung der Harmonie (Erfurt: Beyer und Maring)
- Gottlieb Graupner – A New Preceptor for the German Flute (Boston: G. Graupner)
- P. Hoey – A Plain and Concise Method of Learning the Gregorian Note (Dublin: P. Wogan)
- Samuel Holyoke – The Instrumental Assistant (Exeter, NH: H. Ranlet)
- William Shield – An Introduction to Harmony (London: printed for the Author, sold by G. G. & J. Robinson)
- Georg Joseph Vogler
  - Choral-System (Kopenhagen: Haly'schen Musikhandlung)
  - Musik-skole (Kiøbenhavn: Niels Christensen)

== Births ==
- January 1
  - Filipina Brzezinska-Szymanowska, Polish pianist and composer (died 1886)
  - Johann Kulik, luthier (died 1872)
- January 11 – Giuseppina Ronzi de Begnis, Italian operatic soprano (died 1853)
- January 14 – Ludwig Ritter von Köchel, music researcher and composer (died 1877)
- March 5 – Georg Friedrich Daumer, librettist and philosopher (died 1875)
- May 5 – Raymond Brucker, librettist and writer (died 1875)
- June 24 – Antonio James Oury (Anna Caroline Oury), composer and pianist (died 1880)
- July 30 – Alexander Veltman, lyricist and writer (died 1870)
- July 31 – Michel Masson, lyricist and writer (died 1883)
- August 26 – Joseph Christoph Kessler, German pianist and composer (died 1872)
- October 12 – Francesco Florimo, composer and music historian (died 1888)
- November 6 – Eduard Grell, composer and conductor (died 1886)
- December 1 – Mihály Vörösmarty, lyricist and poet (died 1855)
- December 4 – Emil Aarestrup, lyricist and poet (died 1856)
- date unknown
  - Eduard Brendler, composer (died 1831)
  - Maria Caterina Rosalbina Caradori-Allan, French operatic soprano (died 1865)
  - Pavel Mochalov, lyricist and actor (died 1848)

== Deaths ==
- January 4 – Giovanni Battista Mancini, Italian castrato and singing teacher (born 1714)
- January 6 – William Jones, music theorist and clergyman (born 1726)
- March 9 – Dominique Della-Maria, composer and mandolin virtuoso (born 1768)
- April 29 – Johann Christian Fischer, oboist and composer (born 1733)
- May 7 – Niccolò Piccinni, composer (born 1728)
- June 6 – Margareta Sofia Lagerqvist, opera singer (born 1771)
- June 10 – Johann Abraham Peter Schulz, composer (born 1747)
- June 11 – Margarethe Danzi, German composer and soprano (born 1768)
- August 3 – Carl Friedrich Christian Fasch, harpsichordist and composer (born 1736)
- August 4 – Julije Bajamonti, composer and historian (born 1744)
- September 8 – Pierre Gaviniès, French violinist and composer (born 1728)
- September 26 – William Billings, America's first major composer (born 1746)
- September 27 – Hyacinthe Jadin, French composer (born 1776; tuberculosis)
