= Robert Volkmann =

German composer (1815–1883)

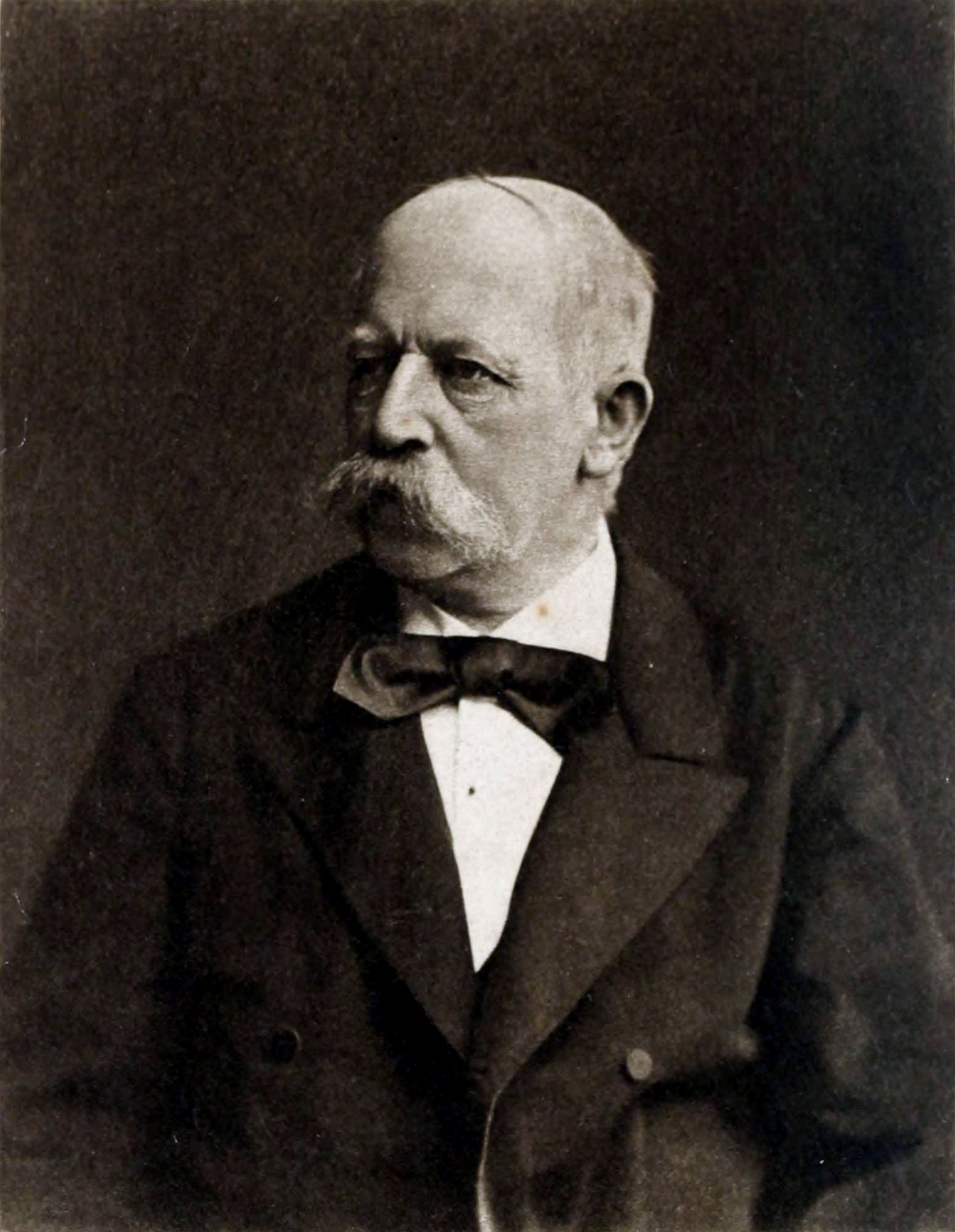
Robert Volkmann

Friedrich Robert Volkmann (6 April 1815 – 30 October 1883) was a German composer.

== Life ==
Robert Volkmann was born in Lommatzsch near Meißen in the Kingdom of Saxony. His father, a music director for a church, trained him in music to prepare him as a successor. Thus, Volkmann learned to play the organ and the piano with his father, studied violin and cello with Friebel, and by age 12, he was playing the cello part in string quartets by Haydn, Mozart and Beethoven. In 1832, he entered the Freiberg Gymnasium for the purpose of becoming a teacher. There he studied music with August Ferdinand Anacker, who encouraged him to devote himself to music more fully. From there he went on to Leipzig in 1836 to study with Carl Ferdinand Becker. In Leipzig, he met Robert Schumann who encouraged him in his studies. They met again several times after that.

When he finished his studies, he began working as voice teacher at a music school in Prague. He did not stay there long, and in 1841 he moved to Budapest, where he was employed as a piano teacher and a reporter for the Allgemeine Wiener Musik-Zeitung.

After a short period of freelance work, he became the choirmaster and organist of a Reform synagogue in 1848. He composed in virtual obscurity until 1852, when his Piano Trio in B-flat minor caught the ears of Franz Liszt and Hans von Bülow, who proceeded to play it several times all over Europe. In 1854, Volkmann moved to Vienna, only to return to Budapest in 1858.

Thanks to the publisher Gustav Heckenast, who in 1857 bought the rights to publish all Volkmann's works in exchange for regular income regardless of sales, Volkmann was able to fully dedicate himself to composition, until Heckenast closed down his Budapest publishing house in the early 1870s.

While visiting Vienna in 1864, Volkmann became acquainted with Johannes Brahms, and they became close friends. In letters they addressed each other as "lieber Freund" ("dear friend").

From the 1870s Volkmann slowed down and composed very little. From 1875 until his death, he was professor of harmony and counterpoint at Budapest's National Academy of Music, where Liszt was the director.

Volkmann died in Budapest aged 68.
