= 1798 in philosophy =

1798 in philosophy

== Publications ==
- Immanuel Kant's Anthropology from a Pragmatic Point of View
- Thomas Robert Malthus's An Essay on the Principle of Population

== Births ==
- February 17 - Friedrich Eduard Beneke (died 1854)
- February 19 - Auguste Comte (died 1857)
- April 7 - Pierre Leroux (died 1871)
- May 9 - Augustin Bonnetty (died 1879)
- June 29 - Giacomo Leopardi (died 1837)
- December 20 - Laurens Perseus Hickok (died 1888)
- December 29 - Barzillai Quaife (died 1873)

== Deaths ==
- December 1 - Michael Gottlieb Birckner (born 1756)
- May 28 - James Dunbar (born 1742)
- June 24 - Rigas Feraios (born 1757)
- December 1 - Christian Garve (born 1742)
