= Pathétique =

Pathétique may refer to:

- Piano Sonata No. 8 (Beethoven), in C minor (Op.13), titled Pathétique by Beethoven
- Symphony No. 6 (Tchaikovsky), in B minor (Op.74), also titled Pathétique by the composer's younger brother, Modest Ilyich Tchaikovsky
