= Duvernoy =

Duvernoy is a family name of French origins. It may refer to:

- Charles Duvernoy (Jacques Charles Duvernoy) (1766–1845), French clarinetist and composer; father of Henri, Charles-François, and Frédéric Duvernoy
- Charles-François Duvernoy (1796–1872), French opera singer; brother of Henri and Frédéric Duvernoy; father of Victor Alphonse and Edmond Duvernoy
- Edmond Duvernoy (1844–1927), French baritone and teacher; brother of Victor Alphonse Duvernoy
- Frédéric Nicolas Duvernoy (1765–1838), French horn player and composer; brother of Charles Duvernoy
- Frédéric Duvernoy (1800–1874), French horn player; brother of Henri Duvernoy
- Georges Louis Duvernoy (1777–1855), French zoologist
- Gustav von Duvernoy (1802–1890), German lawyer and politician
- Henri Duvernoy (1820–1906), French composer and organist
- Jean-Baptiste Duvernoy (1802–1880), French pianist and composer
- Victor Alphonse Duvernoy (1842–1907), French pianist and composer; brother of Edmond Duvernoy
- Marion Duvernoy (1989- ), écrivaine

In biology:

- Duvernoy's gland, a gland found in some snakes named for French zoologist Georges Louis Duvernoy
