= Piano Concerto No. 3 (Beethoven) =

Work by Ludwig van Beethoven

Piano Concerto in C minor
- No.3
- by Ludwig van Beethoven
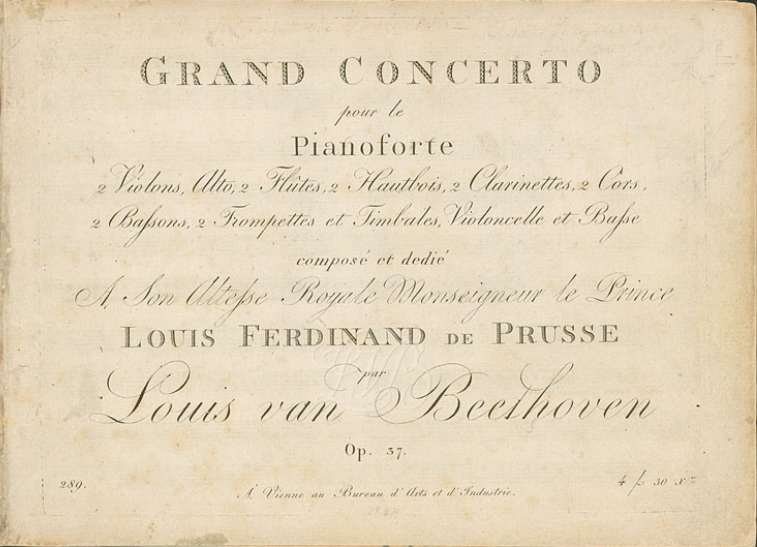
- Title page of the first edition
- Opus: 37
- Year: 1800
- Style: Classical
- Dedication: Louis Ferdinand of Prussia
- Performed: April 5, 1803; 223 years ago Vienna
- Published: 1804
- Movements: 3 (Allegro con brio; Largo; Rondo. Allegro - Presto)
- Scoring: Piano; orchestra

Beethoven's Piano Concerto No. 3 in C minor, Op. 37 is thought to have been composed in 1800, although the year of its composition has been questioned by some contemporary musicologists. It was first performed on 5 April 1803, with the composer as soloist. During that same performance, the Second Symphony and the oratorio Christ on the Mount of Olives were also premiered. The composition was published in 1804 and was dedicated to Prince Louis Ferdinand of Prussia. The first primary theme is reminiscent of that of Mozart's 24th Piano Concerto, also in C minor.

== Structure ==
The concerto is scored for 2 flutes, 2 oboes, 2 clarinets in B♭, 2 bassoons, 2 horns in E♭, E and C, 2 trumpets in C, timpani, strings, and piano soloist.

As is standard for Classical/Romantic-era concertos, the work is in three movements, with a typical performance time of 35 minutes:

1. Allegro con brio
2. Largo
3. Rondo. Allegro – Presto

=== I. Allegro con brio ===
I. Allegro con brio

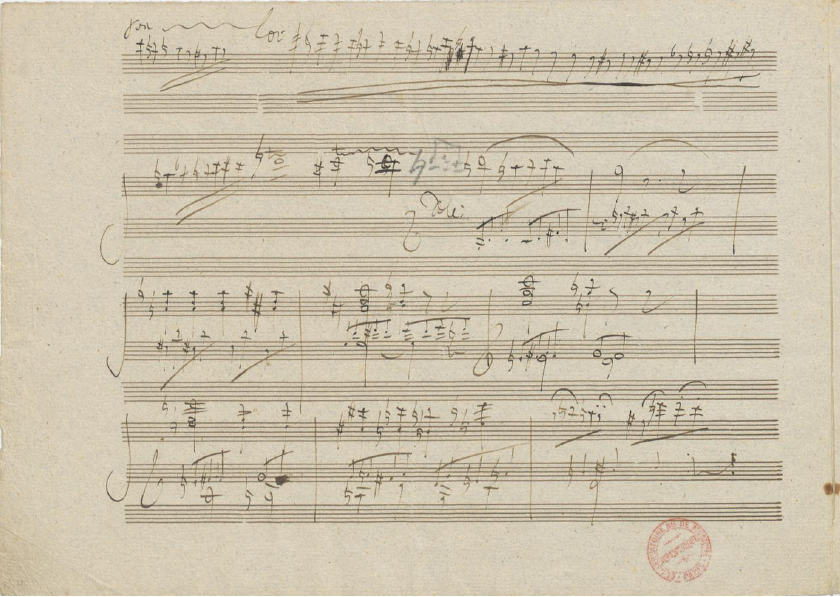
Cadenza of the first movement

This movement is known to make forceful use of the theme (direct and indirect) throughout.

Orchestral exposition: In the orchestral exposition, the theme is introduced by the strings and used throughout the movement. It is developed several times. In the third section (second subject), the clarinet and violin 1 introduce the second main theme, which is initially in the relative key, E♭ major, and then in the tonic major, C major, finally back to C minor.

Second exposition: The piano enters with an ascending scale motif. The structure of the exposition in the piano solo is similar to that of the orchestral exposition.

Development: The piano enters, playing similar scales used in the beginning of the second exposition, this time in D major rather than C minor. The music is generally quiet.

Recapitulation: The orchestra restates the theme in fortissimo, with the wind instruments responding by building up a minor ninth chord as in the exposition. For the return of the second subject, Beethoven modulates to the tonic major, C major. A dark transition to the cadenza occurs, immediately switching from C major to C minor.

Cadenza: Beethoven wrote one cadenza for this movement, which is at times stormy and ends on a series of trills that calm down to pianissimo. Many other composers and pianists, such as Charles Alkan, Gabriel Fauré, Edwin Fischer, Wilhelm Kempff, Franz Liszt, Ignaz Moscheles (whose cadenza was misattributed to Johannes Brahms), Carl Reinecke, Fazıl Say, Clara Schumann, and Bedřich Smetana, have written alternative cadenzas.

Coda: Beethoven subverts the expectation of a return to the tonic at the end of the cadenza by prolonging the final trill and eventually arriving on a dominant seventh. The piano plays a series of arpeggios before the music settles into the home key of C minor. Then the music intensifies before a full tutti occurs, followed by the piano playing descending arpeggios, the ascending scale from the second exposition, and finally a resolute ending on C.

=== II. Largo ===
II. Largo

III. Rondo. Allegro – Presto

The second movement is in the key of E major, in this context a key relatively remote from the concerto's opening key of C minor (another example being the much later Brahms's first symphony). If the movement adhered to traditional form, its key would be E♭ major (the relative key), A♭ major (the submediant major or subdominant parallel) or C major (the tonic major or parallel key). The movement opens with the solo piano, and the opening is marked with detailed pedaling instructions.

=== III. Rondo. Allegro – Presto ===
The finale is in sonata rondo form. The movement begins in C minor with an agitated theme played only by the piano. The movement ends with a C major coda marked presto.

== First performance ==
The score was incomplete at its first performance. Beethoven's friend Ignaz von Seyfried, who turned the pages of the music for him that night, later wrote:

I saw almost nothing but empty pages; at the most, on one page or another a few Egyptian hieroglyphs wholly unintelligible to me were scribbled down to serve as clues for him; for he played nearly all the solo part from memory since, as was so often the case, he had not had time to set it all down on paper.
