= Annales de philosophie chrétienne =

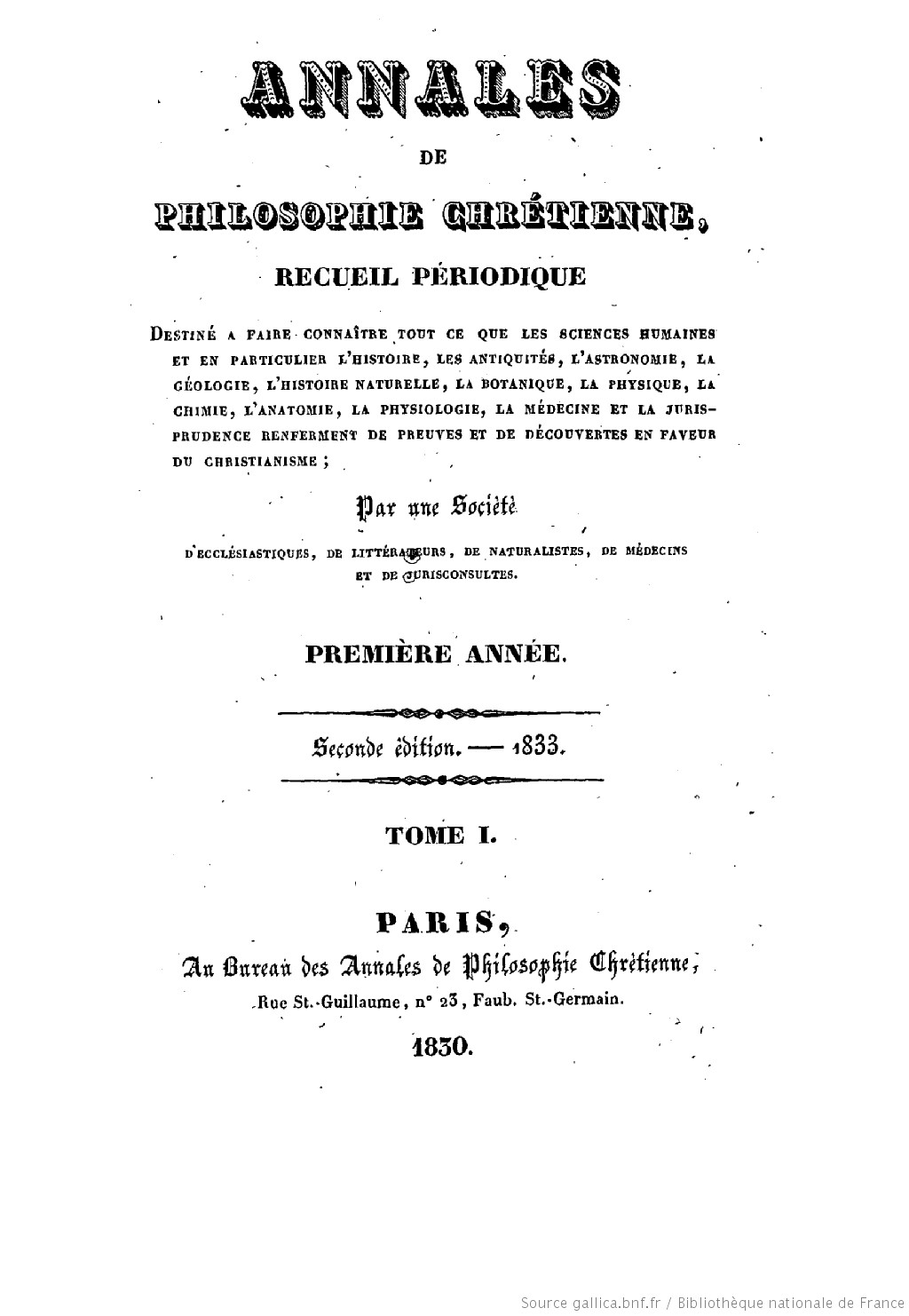
- Discipline: Philosophy, theology
- Language: French
- Edited by: Augustin Bonnetty (1830-1879); Xavier Roux (1879-1884); Joseph Guieu (1884-1895); Charles Denis (1895-1905); Lucien Laberthonnière (1905-1913)

Publication details
- History: 1830-1913
- Frequency: Monthly

Standard abbreviations
- ISO 4: Ann. philos. chrét.

Indexing
- ISSN: 1250-8950 (print); 2418-6015 (web)
- OCLC no.: 1776368

Annales de philosophie chrétienne ('Annals of Christian philosophy') was a monthly Catholic journal that existed from 1830 to 1913. It was founded by Augustin Bonnetty.

The journal was placed on the Index Librorum Prohibitorum on May 5, 1913, due to its support of immanentism and modernism, and ceased being published thereafter.
