= Symphony No. 1 (Beethoven) =

1800 symphony by Ludwig van Beethoven

- by Ludwig van Beethoven
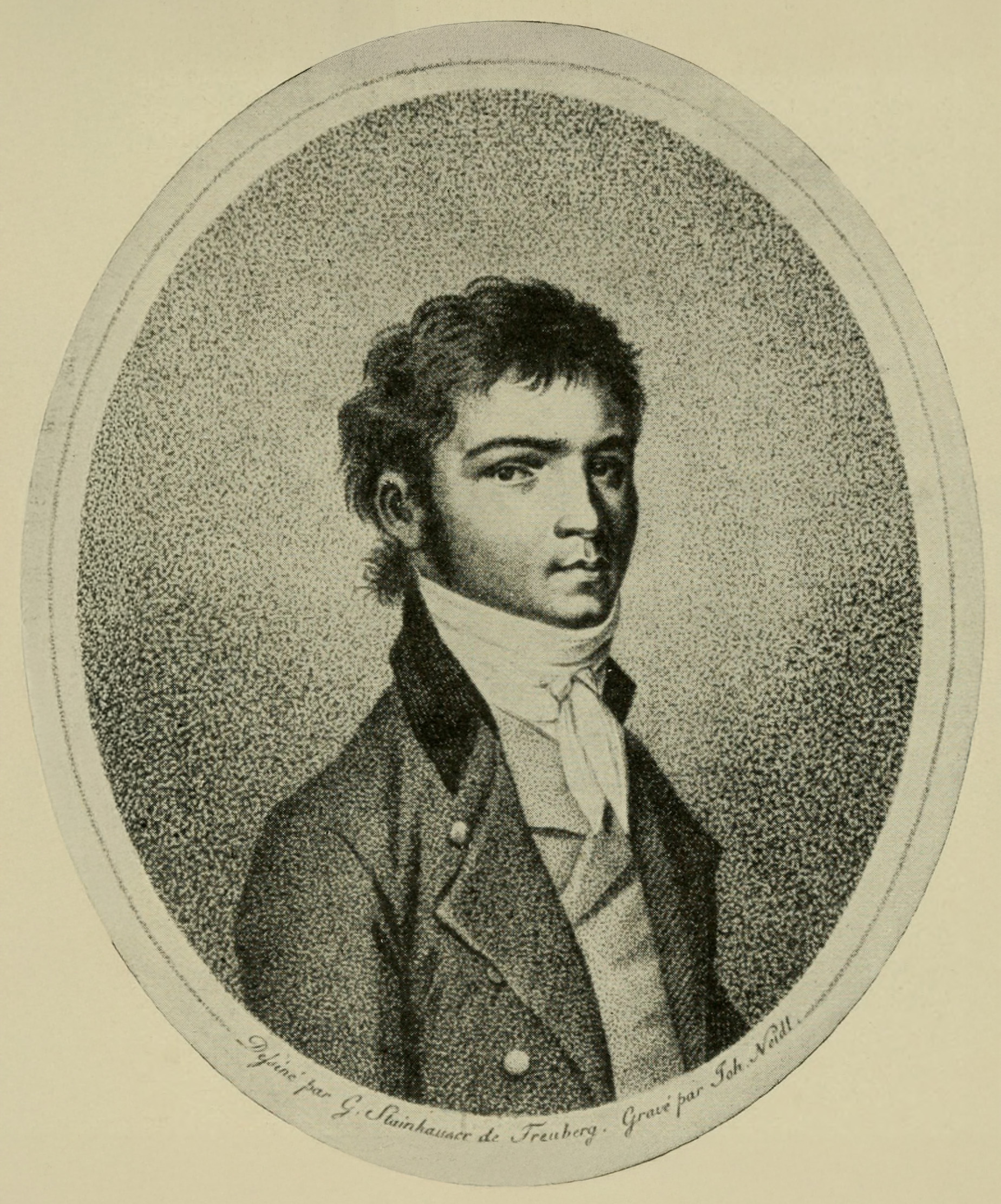
- 1801 engraving by Johann Joseph Neidl, after a now-lost portrait of Beethoven by Gandolph Ernst Stainhauser von Treuberg, c. 1800
- Key: C major
- Opus: 21
- Style: Classical period
- Composed: 1795–1800
- Dedication: Gottfried van Swieten
- Published: 1801
- Duration: 22–29 minutes
- Movements: 4

Premiere
- Date: 2 April 1800
- Location: K.K. Hoftheater nächst der Burg, Vienna
- Conductor: Ludwig van Beethoven

Ludwig van Beethoven's Symphony No. 1 in C major, Op. 21, was dedicated to Baron Gottfried van Swieten, an early patron of the composer. The piece was published in 1801 by Hoffmeister & Kühnel of Leipzig. It is not known exactly when Beethoven finished writing this work, but sketches of the finale were found to be from 1795.

== Historical background ==
The symphony is clearly indebted to Beethoven's predecessors, particularly his teacher Joseph Haydn as well as Wolfgang Amadeus Mozart, but nonetheless has characteristics that mark it uniquely as Beethoven's work, notably the frequent use of sforzandi, as well as sudden shifts in tonal centers that were uncommon for traditional symphonic form (particularly in the 3rd movement), and the prominent, more independent use of wind instruments. Sketches for the finale are found among the exercises Beethoven wrote while studying counterpoint under Johann Georg Albrechtsberger in the spring of 1797.

Beethoven originally intended to dedicate the symphony to Elector Maximilian Franz, who had been forced from Bonn by the armies of revolutionary France and was staying in Hetzendorf, just outside Vienna at the time. Beethoven had left the Elector's employ in somewhat acrimonious circumstances in March 1794 and the dedication may have been intended as a peace offering. However, Maximilian Franz died 26 July 1801 and the dedication subsequently went to Baron van Swieten.

The premiere took place on 2 April 1800 at the K.K. Hoftheater nächst der Burg in Vienna, conducted by Giacomo Conti (not by Beethoven himself). Most sources agree that the concert program also included Beethoven's Septet as well as a symphony by Mozart, but there is some disagreement as to whether the remainder of the program included excerpts from Haydn's oratorio The Creation or from The Seasons and whether Beethoven's own Piano Concerto No. 1 or No. 2 was performed. This concert effectively served to announce Beethoven's talents to Vienna.

== Instrumentation ==
The symphony is scored for the following instrumentation:

Woodwinds:

2 flutes
2 oboes
2 clarinets in C
2 bassoons

Brass:

2 horns in C
2 trumpets in C

Percussion:

2 timpani in C and G

Strings:

1st violins
2nd violins
violas
cellos
double basses

The clarinet parts are commonly played on B♭ clarinet, as C and D clarinets are no longer widely used. However, there is some controversy over whether they should be played on E♭ instruments instead. The E♭ clarinet's timbre is much closer to that of the C and D clarinets than that of the warmer-sounding B♭ clarinet. The second flute is not used in the second movement.

== Music ==
I. Adagio molto – Allegro con brio

II. Andante cantabile con moto

III. Menuetto: Allegro molto e vivace

IV. Adagio – Allegro molto e vivace
United States Marine Band

There are four movements:

1. Adagio molto – Allegro con brio, 4/4 – 2/2 (C major)
2. Andante cantabile con moto, 3/8 in (F major)
3. Menuetto: Allegro molto e vivace, 3/4 (C major)
4. Adagio – Allegro molto e vivace, 2/4 (C major)

A typical performance lasts between 22 and 29 minutes.

=== I. Adagio molto – Allegro con brio ===
The beginning of the twelve-bar introduction of the first movement is sometimes considered a "musical joke". For example, the English musicologist Donald Tovey has called this work "a comedy of manners". In fact, Symphony No. 1 can be regarded as a result of Beethoven's bold musical experimentation and advancement which he presents 5 years after Haydn's last symphony and 12 years after Mozart's final Jupiter Symphony: Unusually, Beethoven's Symphony No. 1 starts with a sequence of repeatedly accentuated dominant–tonic chord sequences, however, in the "wrong" key and untouching and leading away from the tonic, so that the listener only gradually realizes the real key (or home key) of the symphony.

In correlation to the tradition, however, the 1st movement is composed exemplarily in sonata form. Here, as a new element, Beethoven uses the more lyrical second subject to display and intertwine the woodwind with the string instruments. The development is elaborate and mainly based on the first subject of the movement and explores a long harmonic progression (starting from A major, reaching B♭ major, passing F major at the end); it also refines the juxtaposition and combination of the orchestral instruments (woodwinds and strings); the recapitulation is almost coherent with the exposition; the coda reminisces the motivic work of the development before it closes the movement with strongly repeated chords played by the whole orchestra.

=== II. Andante cantabile con moto ===
Due to Beethoven's metronome markings and the addition of the indication of con moto ("with motion"), the Andante (in F major, the subdominant of the symphony's home key) of the 2nd movement is played considerably faster than the general concept of that tempo. In contrast to the tradition, Beethoven uses the entire instrumentation of the orchestra (2nd flute tacet) and, consequently, displays a vast spectrum of sound in this movement which, as well, is composed in sonata form.

=== III. Menuetto: Allegro molto e vivace ===
The 3rd movement is on the one hand remarkable because, although it is indicated as Menuetto, it is marked Allegro molto e vivace and, consequently, to be played so fast that it is essentially a Scherzo – a description mostly used after Beethoven's first symphony. Secondly, as an inherent element of the scherzo, it does not customarily display new melodies or motives but instead uses the musical scales and triads from the first movement as motivic material which render this movement's momentum and wit. One notable element of this movement is the sudden change of tonal center very early in the movement. While many opening themes of symphonic writing of the Classical period typically stayed within diatonic harmony, Beethoven shifts chromatically from C major up to D flat major only about 36 bars into the movement. Given the tempo, a listener would hear that dramatic shift only about 15 seconds into the movement.

=== IV. Adagio – Allegro molto e vivace ===
The finale opens with another introduction consisting only of scale fragments played slowly by the first violins alone (an unusual effect) beginning on G and gradually adding more notes. After finally reaching an F, outlining a dominant seventh chord in C major, the real start of the finale Allegro molto e vivace begins in C major with a theme similar (both in rhythm and character) to the 4th movement of Haydn's Symphony No. 88 in G major. Composed again in a solid sonata form, Beethoven uses the scale as the prevailing motivic element in this movement which, by character, pays most of all tribute to the customary finale established by Haydn in the preceding decades.

The musical form is in accordance with the established composing tradition. Musical content, instrumentation as well as tempi, is unusual, if not revolutionary, in its use for a symphonic work of Beethoven's time. Therefore, Beethoven introduced himself with this work as an advancing symphonic composer and stood true to this statement throughout his compositional life.
