= Piano Sonata No. 8 (Beethoven) =

1798 sonata by Ludwig van Beethoven

- Pathétique
- by Ludwig van Beethoven
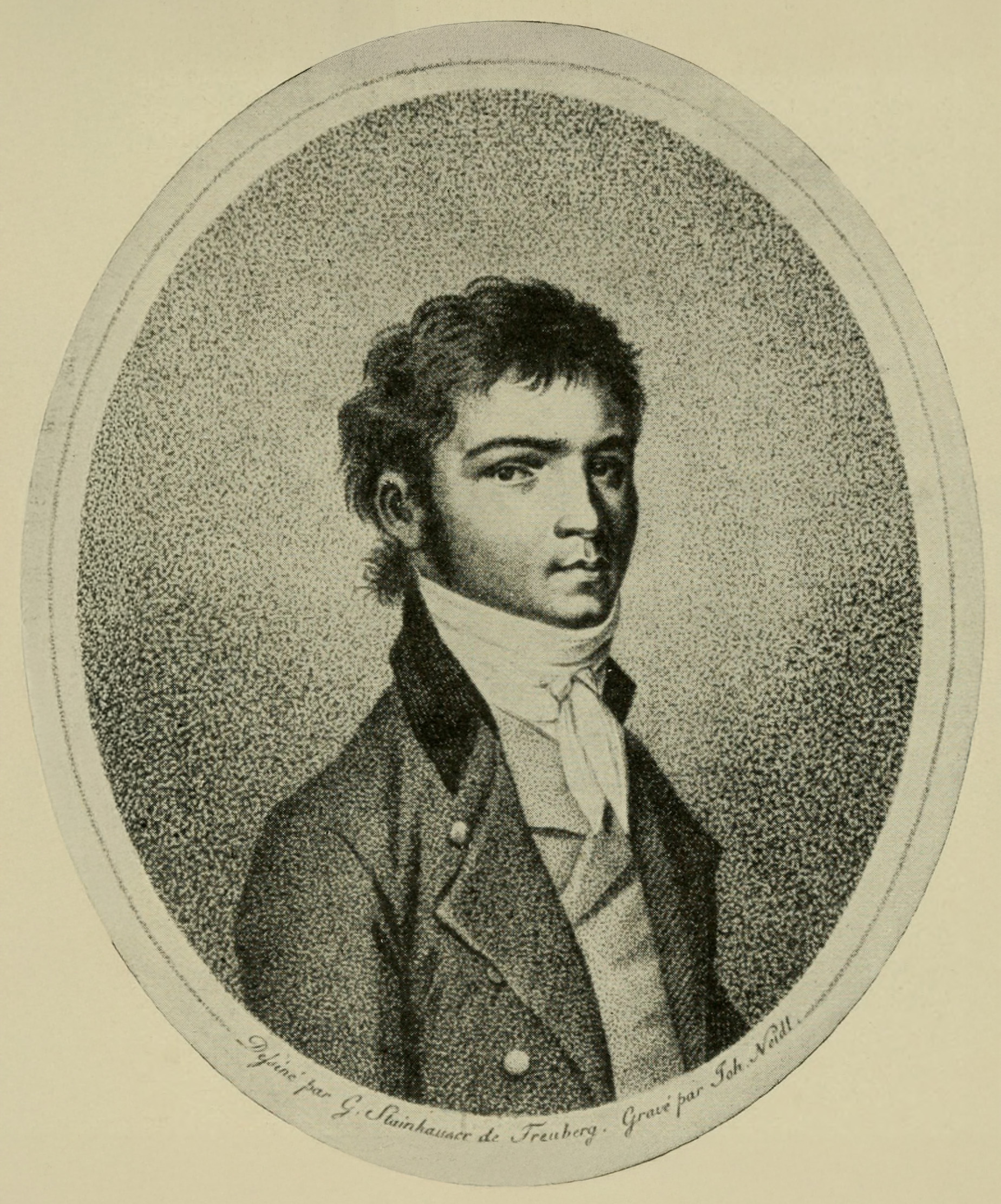
- 1801 engraving by Johann Joseph Neidl, after a now-lost portrait of Beethoven by Gandolph Ernst Stainhauser von Treuberg, ca. 1800
- Key: C minor
- Opus: 13
- Composed: 1798–1799
- Dedication: Prince Karl von Lichnowsky
- Published: 1799
- Duration: 17–20 minutes
- Movements: 3
- Scoring: Solo piano

Ludwig van Beethoven's Piano Sonata No. 8 in C minor, Op. 13, commonly known as Sonata Pathétique, was written in 1798 when the composer was 27 years old and was published in 1799. It has remained one of his most celebrated compositions. Beethoven dedicated the work to his friend Prince Karl von Lichnowsky. Although commonly thought to be one of the few works to be named by the composer himself, it was actually named Grande sonate pathétique (to Beethoven's liking) by the publisher, who was impressed by the sonata's tragic sonorities.

== Movements ==
I. Grave – Allegro di molto e con brio

II. Adagio cantabile

III. Rondo: Allegro
Performed by Paul Pitman

In its entirety, encompassing all three movements, the work takes approximately 17–20 minutes to perform.

The sonata consists of three movements:

1. Grave – Allegro di molto e con brio
2. Adagio cantabile
3. Rondo: Allegro

=== I. Grave – Allegro di molto e con brio ===
The first movement is in sonata form. It begins with a slow introductory theme, marked Grave.

The exposition, marked Allegro di molto con brio, is in 2/2 time (alla breve) in the home key of C minor and features three themes. Theme 1 features an aggressive rocket theme covering two octaves, accompanied with constant tremolo octaves in the left hand.

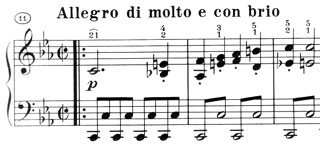

Beethoven then makes use of unorthodox mode mixture, as he presents theme 2 in E♭ minor rather than its customary parallel major. This theme is more lyrical than the first and makes use of grace notes and crossed hands. Theme 3 modulates to the mediant, E♭ major, and features a murky figuration for the bass; an extended pattern of alternating octaves. A codetta, with ideas from the opening allegro, closes the section. Some performers of the sonata include the introduction in the repeat of the exposition (Rudolf Serkin and András Schiff, for example), but most return to the beginning of the allegro section. This movement is one of the few compositions that contain hundred twenty-eighth notes.

The development section begins in the key of G minor but quickly modulates to E minor. In this section, Beethoven extends Haydn's compositional practice by returning to the introductory section. After this reappearance of the Grave, the composer generates suspense with an extended dominant preparation.

The recapitulation brings back the themes of the exposition in different keys: themes 1 and 3 are played in the tonic key of C minor, then theme 2 is played in the unexpected key of F minor but then returns to the tonic key. The coda is very dramatic and includes a brief reminder of the Grave before ending with a swift cadence.

=== II. Adagio cantabile ===
This movement exemplifies the expressive Adagio style of many slow movements in the classical period. The famous cantabile melody is played three times, always in A♭ major, separated by two modulating episodes; the movement is thus a simple rondo rather than the sonata form more common for movements of this seriousness. The first episode is set in F minor (the relative minor of A♭ major), further modulating to E♭ major before returning to the main theme. The second episode begins in A♭ minor and modulates to E major. With the final return of the main theme, the accompaniment becomes richer and takes on the triplet rhythm of the second episode. There is a brief coda.

Second movement MIDI rendition, 5:03 minutes, 12 KB

=== III. Rondo: Allegro ===
The sonata closes with a cut time movement in C minor. The main theme closely resembles the second theme of the Allegro of the first movement: its melodic pattern is identical for its first four notes, and its rhythmic pattern for the first eight. There is also a modified representation of the melody from the second movement, so it connects all three movements together. The movement is in sonata rondo form and includes a brief coda that ultimately ends very abruptly. The three rondo episodes are in E♭ major, A♭ major, and C major. The common use of sforzando creates a forceful effect.

Third movement MIDI rendition, 4:25 minutes, 17 KB

== Reactions of Beethoven's contemporaries ==
The sonata Pathétique was an important success for Beethoven, selling well and helping create his reputation as a composer, not just as an pianist. Not only was it popular, it also exposed the world to the characteristics that Beethoven would continue to develop in the coming years.

When the pianist and composer Ignaz Moscheles discovered the work in 1804, he was ten years old; unable to afford to buy the music, he copied it out from a library copy. His music teacher, on being told about his discovery, "warned me against playing or studying eccentric productions before I had developed a style based on more respectable models. Without paying heed to his instructions, however, I laid Beethoven's works on the piano, in the order of their appearance, and found in them such consolation and pleasure as no other composer ever vouchsafed me."

Anton Schindler, a musician who was a friend of Beethoven in the composer's later years, wrote: "What the Sonate Pathétique was in the hands of Beethoven (although he left something to be desired as regards clean playing) was something that one had to have heard, and heard again, in order to be quite certain that it was the same already well-known work. Above all, every single thing became, in his hands, a new creation, wherein his always legato playing, one of the particular characteristics of his execution, formed an important part."

== Possible earlier influences ==
Musicologists have speculated on whether the Pathétique may have been inspired by Mozart's piano sonata K. 457, since both compositions are in C minor and have three very similar movements. The second movement, "Adagio cantabile", especially, makes use of a theme remarkably similar to one in the spacious second movement of Mozart's sonata.

Close similarities have also been noted with J.S. Bach's Partita No. 2 in C minor. Both works open with a declamatory fanfare marked Grave, sharing a distinct combination of dotted rhythms, melodic contour, and texture. Furthermore, the first four notes of the Partita's Andante (G–C–D–E♭, prominently repeated throughout the work) are found in the Pathétique as the first notes of important themes – first in the hand-crossing second subject of its first movement (initially transposed), then in the main theme of the Rondo. It is known that Beethoven was familiar with the works of Bach, having studied The Well-Tempered Clavier as a youth and returning to his predecessor's compositional styles later in life.

== Other uses in classical music ==
- The cantabile theme from the second movement was used as the theme music for radio's most widely listened-to classical music program, Adventures in Good Music, which aired nationally in the United States and in many other countries from 1970 to 2007. The theme was performed by Karl Haas, the program's host.

== See also ==
- Beethoven and C minor
