= Lucien Laberthonnière =

French Oratorian priest and theologian

Father Lucien Laberthonnière CO
- Born: October 5, 1860; Chazelet, France
- Died: October 6, 1932 (aged 72); Paris, France

Philosophical work
- Era: Modern philosophy
- School: Catholic modernism
- Notable ideas: Moral dogmatism

Lucien Laberthonnière was a French Oratorian priest, theologian, philosopher and historian of philosophy. He was a central figure in the Modernist crisis along with his close friend and primary philosophical influence Maurice Blondel. He also influenced George Tyrell and his writings were placed on the Index of Forbidden Books in 1913.

== Biography ==
Laberthonnière was born in Chazelet October 5, 1860 and died in Paris October 6, 1932. He was ordained an Oratorian priest in 1886. He taught philosophy at the Collège de Juilly from 1887 to 1896. In 1894, he met Maurice Blondel after being impressed with his dissertation L'Action. The two began an intimate correspondence which would later be published by Claude Tresmontant.

He was named director of the École Massillon in 1897 through 1900 and returned to the Collège de Juilly from 1900 to 1903 as director. He was relieved from his pedagogical responsibilities as a result of the anticlerical laws enforced under Émile Combes. He then moved to an apartment on Rue Las Cases in 7th arrondissement of Paris to focus exclusively on philosophical research and intellectual apostolate. Anxious to define his work as Christian philosophy, he opposed "réalisme chrétien et l'idéalisme grec". In 1905, he founded an association of religious studies and became a titular member of the Société française de philosophie. He served as director of the Annales de philosophie chrétienne de 1905 à 1913 and was heavily criticized by diverse theologians. He focused on issues related to the relationship between faith and reason. In 1906, his works Essais de philosophie religieuse and Le réalisme chrétien et l'idéalisme grec were censured. His attacks on Action française, notably in Positivisme et catholicisme (1911), brought negative attention from integralists. In 1913, the Annales were placed on the Index of Forbidden Books. Laberthonnière submitted to the ban on publishing but was not banned from preaching. During the First World War, Laberthonnière was asked by Henri-Louis Chapon, Bishop of Nice to write a doctrinal letter condemning Pan-Germanism. He served as chaplain to blind soldiers at the Hôpital des Quinze-Vingts, where he met his friend the Protestant pastor Marc Boegner.

After the war, Laberthonnière participated in many private ecumenical meetings. From the years 1925 to 1927, he wrote the Lent conferences at the Cathedral of Notre Dame de Paris. He died of an illness on October 6, 1932, at the age of 72. His funeral at Sainte-Clotilde was held discreetly, to the satisfaction of Alfred Baudrillart who worried it would have the "character of a demonstration." Louis Canet oversaw the posthumous publication of his work.

== Thought ==
Laberthonnière was influenced by Maurice Blondel and Blaise Pascal. His work focused on the existential dimension of Christianity contrary to the so-called extrinsicism of Neo-Scholasticism. He utilized the "method of immanence" treated of skeptically by Pope Pius X in Pascendi Dominici gregis and emphasized the interior experience of Christianity against the empirical claims of apologetics.

Laberthonnière was loosely associated with Le Sillon though he had a poor relationship with Marc Sangnier and was a public opponent of Charles Maurras and Action française. He was also critical of L'Univers, perceiving its focus on the papacy as a perversion of Catholicism. While critical of anticlericalism, he called for a greater degree of separation of church and state and was critical of militant Catholic movements.

== Bibliography ==
- Théorie de l'éducation, 1901.
- Essais de philosophie religieuse, 1903.
- Le réalisme chrétien et l'idéalisme grec, 1904.
- Le catholicisme et la société, 1907.
- Positivisme et catholicisme, 1911.
- Autour de l'Action française, 1911.
- Le témoignage des martyrs, 1912.
- Sur le chemin du catholicisme, 1913.
- Études sur Descartes, 2 vol., 1935.
- Étude de philosophie cartésienne et Premiers écrits philosophiques, 1937.
- Esquisse d'une philosophie personnaliste, 1945.
- Pangermanisme et christianisme, 1945.
- Sciut ministrator, 1947.
- Critique du laïcisme, 1948.
- La notion chrétienne de l'autorité, 1955.
