= Simoni Dall Croubelis =

Danish composer (1727–1790)

Simoni Dall Croubelis (1727–1790) was a Danish composer.

He was also known as Domingo Simoni, Dominique Simono, Dominique Simonaux and Simoni dâll Croebelis .
