= Augustin Bonnetty =

French thinker and writer

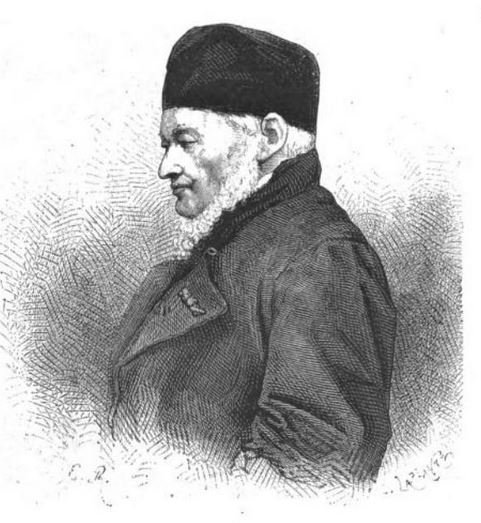
Augustin Bonnetty

Augustin Bonnetty (9 May 1798 – 26 March 1879) was a French thinker and writer who founded and edited the Annales de philosophie chrétienne from 1830 until his death.

== Career ==
Augustin Bonnetty was born in Entrevaux on 9 May 1798. In 1815, he entered Digne-les-Bains seminary and studied for the priesthood. After completing his philosophical and theological studies, as he was too young to be ordained, he went to Marseille as a private tutor. He soon felt that his mission was to use science and philosophy in the defense of the Church and to remain a layman.

In 1825, Bonnetty went to Paris, and five years later founded the Annales de philosophie chrétienne (first number 31 July 1830) which he edited until his death. His main objective was to show the agreement of science and religion, and to point out how the various sciences contributed to the demonstration of Christianity.

In 1838, Bonnetty also took up the direction of the Université catholique founded two years earlier by Gerbet, Salinis, Scorbiac, and Montalembert. Having become the sole owner of this review in 1846, he suspended its publication, in 1855, in order to devote himself exclusively to the Annales. Among the main features of the Annales was the attempt to show the universality of a primitive revelation which is recognizable even in the myths and fables of all nations.

Félicité de Lamennais' Essai sur l'indifférence en matière de religion (1817) impressed Bonnetty so much that he devoted his whole life to justifying and developing its tenet that Christianity is the one universal belief whose basic principles were never lacking in any age or civilization.

Bonnetty's presiding concern was with the philosophy of history. "One begins to understand how all religion as a whole rests on tradition: on history, that is to say, not upon reasoning. One has also to recognize that if for some time past Christianity and the beneficent influence of the church upon the destinies of peoples have come to be better appreciated, this is attributable to historical discoveries, and above all to progress in that area of historical science which bears the name of Philosophy of History."

Bonnetty consistently stressed the necessity of giving an "honourable place" to the humane sciences in the curriculum of ecclesiastical studies. For apologetic purposes, he also advised the study of modern anti-Christian or anti-Catholic writers such as Benjamin Constant or Claude-Henri de Rouvroy, comte de Saint-Simon.

Bonnetty died on 26 March 1879 in Paris.
