= Vincenzo Manfredini =

Italian composer

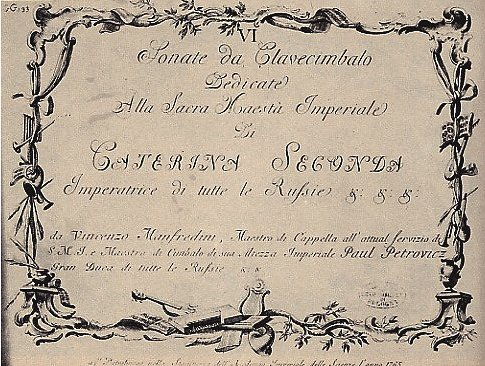
Vincenzo Manfredini: Harpsichord Sonata Cover, Edition of 1765.

Vincenzo Manfredini (22 October 1737 – 5 or 16 August 1799) was an Italian composer, harpsichordist and a music theorist.

== Biography ==
Manfredini was born in Pistoia, in Tuscany.

He studied music with his father, Francesco Onofrio Manfredini. Then, he studied with Perti in Bologna and Fioroni in Milan. In 1758, his older brother Giuseppe, a castrato, went to Moscow with Locatelli's opera troupe, and Vincenzo went with him, possibly as one of the troupe. Moving to St. Petersburg, he became maestro di cappella to Peter Fedorovich, who on becoming Emperor in 1762 made him maestro of the court's Italian opera company. Confirmed in this post by Catherine II, he composed operas and occasional works, but on Galuppi's arrival in 1765, he was relegated to composing the ballets performed with Galuppi's operas and to serving as harpsichord teacher to Pavel Petrovich, heir to the throne.

In 1769, he returned with a pension to Bologna. He would meet Mozart along with his father a year later, in 1770. After two attempts at opera, Manfredini devoted himself mainly to writing and teaching, also publishing a set of symphonies (1776) and string quartets (?1781).

When Pavel Petrovich became Emperor in 1796, he invited his former teacher, who arrived in September 1798, but took up no post and died in St. Petersburg the next year. Manfredini's theoretical research Regole armoniche, o sieno precetti ragionevoli per apprendere la musica (Venice, 1775) has two parts: an introduction to the elements of music and to keyboard accompaniment. It was translated into Russian by Stepan Degtyaryov, a Russian composer, conductor and singer.

The observations of Manfredini on the proper method of teaching singing aroused vigorous opposition from Giovanni Battista Mancini. The second edition (Venice, 1797) was much revised and enlarged with new sections on singing and counterpoint. Manfredini composed numerous operas, as well as ballets, cantatas, sacred music (including a requiem), symphonies, string quartets, concertos, and chamber works.

Vincenzo Manfredini died on 16 August 1799 in St. Petersburg, Russia.

== Operas written for Russian imperial court ==
- Semiramide (Узнанная Семирамида, 1760, St Petersburg)
- L'Olimpiade (Олимпиада, 24 November 1762 Moscow)
- La pupilla (1763, St Petersburg)
- La finta ammalata (1763, St Petersburg)
- Carlo Magno (Карл Великий, 24 November 1763 St Petersburg, revised 1764, St Petersburg)
