= Charles Mayer (composer) =

Prussian pianist and composer (1799–1862)

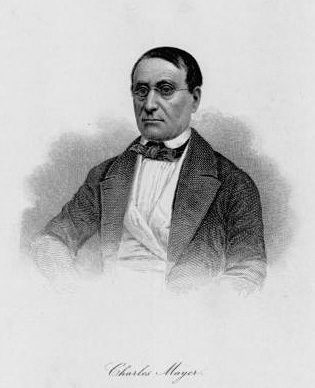
Charles Mayer

Charles Mayer (21 March 1799 – 2 July 1862), also known as Carl Mayer or Charles Meyer, was a Prussian pianist and composer active in the early 19th century.

== Life ==
Mayer was born in Königsberg. His father was a clarinetist who, soon after Charles's birth, moved to Saint Petersburg and four years later to Moscow. He received his early musical education from his mother, followed by extended studies with John Field (1782–1837), with whom he continued to study after the family returned to Saint Petersburg after the Moscow fire of 1812. His first successful tour as a concert pianist in 1814 led him to Poland, Germany, Holland, and France, before he settled in Saint Petersburg in 1819. During another celebrated concert tour of 1845 he travelled through Scandinavia (where he became an honorary member of the Royal College of Music in Stockholm), Germany (Hamburg, Leipzig) and Austria (Vienna). Following the rise of Adolf von Henselt in Saint Petersburg, Mayer withdrew to Dresden in 1846, and died there.

Mayer was a busy and successful teacher who is supposed to have taught some 800 pupils in Saint Petersburg. He was reputed to have taken over the calm and musical (rather than virtuoso) technique established by Field. His most prominent pupils included the Russian pianist and composer Mikhail Glinka and Polish composer Filipina Brzezinska-Szymanowska.

== Music ==
Mayer wrote almost exclusively for the piano, producing more than 350 works for the instrument. His main body of work includes a number of studies, sets of variations on popular melodies, character pieces and dances.

He is sometimes confused with another composer by the same name who died in 1904. Mayer's Valse Mélancolique, subtitled Le Regret, Op. 332, was for more than a century misattributed to Frédéric Chopin, until its true authorship was confirmed by Italian music scholar Luca Chierici in 2012. His Op. 112 mazurka Souvenir de Pologne may be an extension of a possible original work by Chopin based on an album leaf (Allegretto) once found in Leopoldyna Blahetka's album.

== Selected works ==
- Valse de concert Op. 6
- Premium concert polka Op. 9
- 6 Exercises Op. 31
- Variations sur un air russe No. 1 Op. 40
- Variations sur un air russe No. 2 Op. 41
- Rondino Op. 42
- 6 Études Op. 55
- 3 Études Op. 61
- Scherzo Op. 63
- Impromptu No. 2 Op. 65
- Valse-étude No. 4 Op. 69
- Nocturne Op. 81
- Valse-étude Op. 83
- Caprice-Valse No. 1 Op. 85
- Capriccio No. 3 Op. 87
- Études Op. 93
- Divertissement No. 1 Op. 95
- Souvenir de Pologne Mazurka Op. 112
- Valse-étude No. 6 Op. 116
- Galop militaire Op. 117
- Jugendblüthen Op. 121
- 3 Études caractéristiques Op. 127
- Souvenir de Naples Op. 128
- Immortelles Op. 140
- 40 Études Op. 168
- La Dernière rose. Fantaisie varié Op. 169
- 6 Novelletten Op. 179
- 6 Novelletten Op. 183
- Romaneske Op. 184
- Elisa polka Op. 187
- Triolino-étude Op. 190
- Mazurka graçieuse Op. 224
- Chant bohémien Op. 292
- Jugendträume Op. 300
- Grande Étude d'octave Op. 331
- Le Régret Op. 332
