= 1790 in music =

== Events ==
- January 21 – Mozart holds a rehearsal of his new opera Cosi fan Tutte in the presence of his friends Joseph Haydn and Michael Puchberg; it is premiered on January 26 at the Burgtheater in Vienna with libretto by Lorenzo Da Ponte.
- September 25 – The 'Four Great Anhui Troupes' bring Hui opera, or what becomes called Huiju, to Beijing for the birthday of the Qianlong Emperor. This is effectively the birth of the Beijing opera.
- September 28 – Death of music patron Prince Nikolaus Esterházy, following which his son disbands his orchestra and the players disperse.
- December 26 – Joseph Haydn and Ludwig van Beethoven meet for the first time, in Bonn.
- Georg Joseph Vogler brings his invention, the orchestrion, to London.
- August Duranowski becomes leader of the Brussels opera orchestra.

== Opera ==
- Francesco Bianchi – La vendetta di Nino
- Carl Ditters von Dittersdorf
  - Das rote Käppchen, Kr.298, premiered May 26
  - Der Teufel als Hydraulikus
- Étienne Méhul – Euphrosine et Corradin ou le Tyran corrigé
- Wolfgang Amadeus Mozart – Così fan tutte
- Giovanni Paisiello
  - Nina (libretto by Giambattista Lorenzi)
  - Zenobia in Palmira, R.1.81
- William Shield – Hartford Bridge

== Classical music ==
- Ludwig van Beethoven – Cantata on the Death of Joseph II
- Bartolomeo Campagnoli – Flute Concertos Op. 3
- Muzio Clementi – Keyboard Sonata in F, WoO 3
- Johann Ladislaus Dussek – Piano Trio
- Felice Giardini – 6 Quartets, Op. 25
- Joseph Haydn – String Quartets, Op. 64, "Tost", Sonata Hob. XVI No. 49 in E-flat major
- Johann Nepomuk Hummel – Piano Quartet in D major
- Leopold Kozeluch – Clarinet Concerto in E-flat major
- Wolfgang Amadeus Mozart
  - String Quartet No.22 in B-flat major, K.589
  - String Quartet No.23 in F major, K.590
  - String Quintet No.5 in D major, K.593
  - Adagio and Allegro in F minor for a Mechanical Organ, K.594
- Maria Hester Park – 2 Keyboard Sonatas, Op.4
- Claus Schall – Concerto No. 4 for violin and orchestra in D major
- Christoph Ernst Friedrich Weyse – Piano Sonata No.5 in E major
- Paul Wranitzky – Symphony in C major, 'Hungarian'

== Popular music ==
- Charles Dibdin - Meg of Wapping (from 'General Election')
- James Hook – "Rosy Hannah"
- Franz Xaver Partsch – 12 Lieder für das schöne Geschlecht, mit Melodien (Prague)
- The Apollonian Harmony, Vol.2 (London: Button Whitaker's Music Warehouse), including "Epitaph" by William Boyce

== Methods and theory writings ==
- Johann Georg Albrechtsberger – Gründliche Anweisung zur Composition

== Births ==
- February 11 – Ignaz Assmayer, composer (d. 1862)
- February 16 – Chretien Urhan, composer
- March 15 – Nicola Vaccai, composer
- May 12 – Carsten Hauch, lyricist (died 1872)
- June 21 – Wilhelm Speyer, composer (died 1878)
- July 23 – Anna Sofia Sevelin, alto
- October 10 – Georg Gerson, composer (d. 1825)
- October 17 – August Ferdinand Anacker, composer (d. 1854)
- October 30 – Karol Lipiński, violinist and composer (d. 1861)
- November 7 – Luigi Legnani, guitarist and composer (d. 1877)
- November 11 – Joseph Kreutzer, violinist, conductor and composer (d. 1840)
- date unknown
  - Ghanam Krishna Iyer, Carnatic music composer (d. 1854)
  - Anna Maria Sessi, opera singer (d. 1864)

== Deaths ==
- January 25 – Giusto Fernando Tenducci, composer and castrato singer (born c.1736)
- February 14 – Capel Bond, composer, 59
- February 19 – Jean-Baptiste Krumphultz, composer, 47 (suicide by drowning)
- February 20 – Emperor Joseph II, 48
- February 21 – Johann Friedrich Kloffler, conductor and composer, 64
- May 24 – François-Henri Clicquot, organ builder, 57/58
- June 25 – Lovisa Augusti, opera singer, 33
- September 3 – Thomas Norris, composer
- September 28 – Prince Nikolaus Esterházy, patron of Joseph Haydn
- December 16 – Ludwig August Lebrun, composer, 38
- date unknown
  - Simoni Dall Croubelis, composer
  - Pietro Denis, mandolin virtuoso (born 1720)
  - Lucile Grétry, composer, 18
  - Johann Georg Röllig, composer (born 1710)
