= John Lodge Ellerton =

British composer

John Lodge Ellerton (11 January 1801 – 3 January 1873) was an English composer of classical music.

== Life ==
Ellerton was born in Cheshire with the name of John Lodge. He attended Rugby School and graduated with an MA from Brasenose College, Oxford University in 1828. Between 1829 and 1831 he studied under Pietro Terziani in Rome, where he wrote 7 operas in Italian. In 1837 he adopted the name of Ellerton and on 24 August that year married Henrietta Barbara Lumley, the sister of the 8th Earl of Scarbrough.

His English opera "Domenica" was produced at Drury Lane in 1838, but this was unsuccessful; his oratorio Paradise Lost (op. 125; for soloists (SSAATTTBB), chorus (SATB) and orchestra.), published in 1857, had more critical success although apparently few performances.

His Mass in D appeared in 1843: a reviewer wrote, "This is the composition of an amateur, and evidently one who has studied in the right school... it is by no means a discreditable work, nor undeserving of attention. The Kyrie is well conceived, but contains many passages that remind us of Haydn.... The fugue, Cum Sancto Spiritu is well written, but smacks rather much of Mozart's spirited effusions to the same words. The same may be said of the Credo, and following movements...."

In 1835 and 1838 the Catch Club awarded him prizes for glees; he was involved with choral and vocal composition throughout, but his major contribution was in the realm of chamber music.

In 1855 he entertained Richard Wagner in London. In his memoirs Wagner accorded Ellerton "a pleasant and dignified who was a poet, a music-lover and alas, a composer to boot". Ellerton introduced himself to Wagner at one of the Philharmonic Society concerts and hoped that Wagner's presence in London 'might help to counterbalance the overesteem accorded to Mendelssohn.' Ellerton was, according to Wagner, the sole Englishman who was willing to honour him with a social invitation, an event during which Ellerton got so drunk that he had to be conducted homeward by two men at each shoulder, 'for he would scarcely have been capable of proceeding very far down the street on his own.'

Ellerton died at his home in Connaught Place, Hyde Park, London, in 1873.

An obituary in The Musical World commented that "This admirable English amateur... was more of a musician than many who make music their exclusive study.... Mr. Ellerton was an assiduous student and prolific worker in his art, to which he contributed in every style and every department of composition."

== Compositions ==
His musical output includes

- Six symphonies
  - No. 3 "Wald-Symphonie", op. 120, D minor (ca. 1857)
- Approximately fifty string quartets (sources quote numbers ranging from 44 to 55. At least 20 were published during his lifetime and the manuscript parts of a further 28 unpublished quartets are in the library of London's Royal College of Music).
- A string quintet, opus 100, in F minor (string quartet + cello)
- 9 Operas:
  - (in English)
    - Domenica (premiered 7 June 1838, London, Drury Lane)
    - The Bridal of Triermain (1831, not performed?)
  - in German:
    - Lucinda

His string quartet opus 122 received a performance in 1852. The composition's mostly negative review was republished in the Boston journal Dwight's Journal of Music.

He also produced two books of poetry, "The Bridal of Salerno" (1845) and "The Elixir of Youth" (1864). The latter features a short poem, possibly self-referential, entitled "Neglected Genius".
