= Filipina Brzezińska-Szymanowska =

Polish pianist and composer

Filipina Brzezińska-Szymanowska (1 January 1800 – 11 November 1886) was a Polish pianist and composer. She was born in Warsaw, the daughter of Franciszek Szymanowski and Agata Wołowska. She studied with Charles Mayer and was influenced by her sister-in-law, composer Maria Szymanowska. She married Franciszek Jakub Brzeziński (1794–1846) and had four children: Franciszka Teofila Krysińska (born Brzezińska), Kazimierz Brzeziński, Teofila Zieleńska (born Brzezińska) and Aniela Brzezińska.

Brzezińska-Szymanowska composed works for organ and piano. In 1876 she published a collection of short organ preludes. She died in Warsaw.

== Works ==
Selected works include:

- Nocturne
- Verlaß uns nicht (Do not leave us)
- Fifteen short preludes for organ
- In the Tatra Mountains
- Urbi et Orbi, cantata
