= Anton Ferdinand Titz =

German composer and violinist (1742–1811)

Anton Ferdinand Titz (or Tietz, or Dietz) (1742 – 1811) was a German composer, violin and viola d'amore player, principally now known for his string quartets.

== Biography ==
Titz was born in Nuremberg, initially training as a painter before concentrating on music and becoming musician at St. Sebaldus Church. After an unhappy love affair a few years later he went to Vienna, where he played in the opera orchestra. He lived in St Petersburg for 40 years, working at the court of Catherine II of Russia.

He composed lieder, sonatas, string quartets and symphonies. Some works from his time in St Petersburg have been lost.

He began to suffer from mental illness in 1805 which prevented him working.

== Recordings ==
Recordings of his work have been rare, but since 2004 several discs of his chamber music have been released.
