= James Dunbar (writer) =

British philosophical writer

James, Dunbar
- Born: 1742
- Died: 28 May 1798 (aged 55–56); Aberdeen
- Era: 18th century philosophy
- Movement: Scottish Enlightenment

James Dunbar (born 1742, died 28 May 1798) was a British philosophical writer. He was a co-founder of the Royal Society of Edinburgh in 1783.

== Life ==
He was educated at King's College, Aberdeen, of which he was elected a regent in 1766, and in that capacity he taught moral philosophy as a Professor there for thirty years.

Dunbar was in favour of the amalgamation of King's College with Marischal College.

He died in his rooms at King's College on 28 May 1798. He was replaced by Prof Robert Eden Scott in 1800.

== Publications ==
He published:

1. De Primordiis Civitatum Oratio in qua agitur de Bello Civili inter Magnam Britanniam et Colonias nunc flagrante, London, 1779, quarto.
2. Essays on the History of Mankind in rude and uncultivated ages, London, 1780, octavo; 2nd edition 1781.

The latter work deals with such topics as the "Primeval Form of society", "Language as an Universal Accomplishment", "The Criterion of a Polished Tongue", "The Hereditary Genius of Nations".
