= Jean-Xavier Lefèvre =

Swiss-born French clarinettist and composer (1763-1829)

Jean-Xavier Lefèvre (Lausanne Cressis, 6 March 1763 – Paris Neuilly, 9 November 1829) was a Swiss-born French clarinettist and composer.

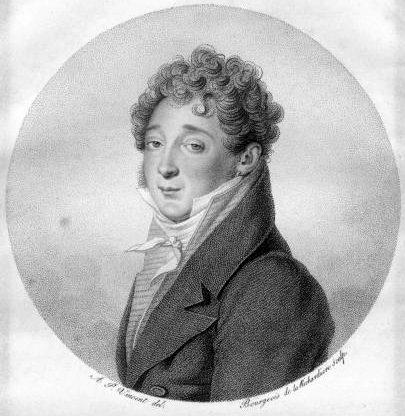
Jean-Xavier Lefèvre

In 1778, at the age of 15, Lefèvre became a member of the French Guards band. When the National Guard was formed in the year of the Revolution he played in this and from 1790 was its deputy conductor. In 1814 he was made a Chevalier of the Legion of Honor. He had many famous pupils at the Paris Conservatoire who included Janssen 1795/6, Péchignier 1797, Crusell 1803, Buteux 1814 to 1819, Crépin 1816 to 1821, Adolphe Hugot 1817 to 1822 and Pierre Hugot 1820 to 1824. He may also have taught Dacosta in 1797 and 1798, but some authorities say Duvernoy did. Very many of Lefèvre's pupils gained First Prizes. Up to the year 1817 a First Prize carried with it the award of a pair of French-made clarinets in B flat and C. From 1818 to 1892 the Prize was of music worth 100 francs. During Lefèvre's term of office the contest piece had always to be the composition of the professor and Sainsbury mentions that in 1799 Lefèvre set his Concerto no.5. Early Conservatoire records are unfortunately incomplete and the only year listed in these is 1824, Lefèvre's last year as professor, when he set Ms Concerto no.3. Compuso 12 sonatas.

== Works for band ==
- 1795: Hymn for mixed choir and band
- 1796: Hymne à l'agriculture pour la fête de l'agriculture célébrée le 28 juin for mixed choir and band

== Pedagogical works ==
- 1802: Méthode de clarinette
- Soixante exercices pour clarinette

== Discography ==
- Eduard Brunner; Tudor 7098; © 2002, (p) 2002
  - Concerto for clarinet and orchestra no.3 in E-flat major
  - Concerto for clarinet and orchestra no.4 in B-flat major
  - Concerto for clarinet and orchestra no.6 in B-flat major
- Jacques Lancelot; King Records Firebird KICC 66 © 1992 (p) 1976
  - Rondo from the Sonata for clarinet and Piano (ciphered bass)
