= 1801 in music =

== Events ==
- January 12 – Domenico Cimarosa is buried at Chiesa di Sant’Angelo, Venice, with a requiem mass performed by local musicians.
- March 28 – Ludwig van Beethoven's ballet The Creatures of Prometheus (Die Geschöpfe des Prometheus) premières in Vienna's Burgtheater.
- April 12 – Théâtre Feydeau in Paris closes down as a result of its director's other commitments.
- April 21 – The Teatro Nuovo in Trieste is inaugurated with a performance of Johann Simon Mayr's Ginevra di Scozia.
- April 24 – Joseph Haydn's oratorio The Seasons is premièred as Die Jahreszeiten in Vienna for its aristocratic patrons at the Palais Schwarzenberg; it has its public première on May 19 at the Redoutensaal.
- December 27 – Nineteen-year-old Niccolò Paganini becomes first violin of Lucca's national orchestra.
- Publication of Introduction to the Art of Playing on the Piano Forte by Muzio Clementi in London.
- Probable publication of A Favorite Collection of Tunes with Variations Adapted for the Northumberland Small Pipes, Violin, or Flute by William Wright in Newcastle upon Tyne with contributions by John Peacock (piper).

== Published popular music ==
- "'Twas in the Solemn Midnight Hour", composed and sung by Mrs Bland

== Classical music ==
- Ludwig van Beethoven
  - Violin Sonata No. 4, Op. 23
  - Violin Sonata No. 5, Op. 24
  - Piano Sonata No. 12, Op. 26
  - Piano Sonata No. 13 & No. 14 (Moonlight), Op. 27
  - Piano Sonata No. 15, Op. 28
  - String Quintet, Op. 29
  - The Creatures of Prometheus, Op. 43
- Johann Baptist Cramer – Piano Sonatas, Op. 25
- Jan Ladislav Dussek
  - Two Piano Sonatas C.184-5
  - Piano Concerto, Op. 49
- John Field – Three Piano Sonatas Op. 1
- Joseph Haydn
  - Mass in B-flat major, Hob.XXII:13
  - The Spirit's Song, Hob.XXVIa:41
  - The Seasons
- Franz Krommer – 3 String Quartets, Op. 19
- John Marsh – Symphony no. 30 in E minor
- Pavel Vranický – Ballet Das Urteil des Paris
- Johann Baptist Wanhal – Clarinet Sonata in C major
- Joseph Woelfl – Duet for Cello and Piano, Op. 31
- Anton Wranitzky – 3 String Quintets, Op. 8
- Carl Friedrich Zelter – 12 Lieder am Clavier zu singen, Z.122

== Opera ==
- Domenico Cimarosa – Artemisia
- Simon Mayr – Ginevra di Scozia
- Étienne Méhul – L'irato
- Rodolphe Kreutzer – Astyanax
- Marcos Portugal – La morte di Semiramide
- Johan Rudolf Zumsteeg – Das Pfauenfest

== Methods and theory writings ==
- Johann Georg Heinrich Backofen – Anleitung zum Harfenspiel
- André Ernest Modeste Grétry – Méthode simple pour apprendre à préluder (Paris: l'imprimerie de la République)
- Johann Christian Kittel – Der angehende praktische Organist (Erfurt: Beyer und Maring)
- Giovanni Punto – Étude ou Exercice Journalier (Offenbach: Johann André)
- Karl Zelter – Karl Friedrich Christian Fasch (Berlin: Johann Friedrich Unger)

== Births ==
- January 11 – John Lodge Ellerton, composer (died 1873)
- January 29 – Johannes Bernardus van Bree, composer (died 1857)
- February 1 – Adolf Fredrik Lindblad, Swedish Composer (died 1878)
- February 21 – Jan Kalivoda, composer
- February 22 – William Barnes, lyricist and writer (died 1886)
- March 11 – Frédéric Bérat, composer and songwriter (died 1855)
- March 19 – Salvatore Cammarano, Italian librettist (died 1852)
- March 26 – Sophie Daguin, ballerina and choreographer (died 1881)
- April 12 – Joseph Lanner, composer (died 1843)
- June 20 – Gustavo Carulli, composer (died 1876)
- June 25 – Antonio d'Antoni, composer and conductor (died 1859)
- August 1 – Karl Johann Philipp Spitta, librettist and poet (died 1859)
- September 13 – Stefan Witwicki, lyricist and poet (died 1847)
- October 17 – Alessandro Curmi, pianist and composer (died 1857)
- October 23 – Albert Lortzing, composer (died 1851)
- November 3 – Vincenzo Bellini, composer (died 1835)
- November 27 – Aleksandr Varlamov, Russian composer (died 1848)

== Deaths ==
- January 11 – Domenico Cimarosa, composer, 51 (probable stomach cancer)
- March 2 – Charles-Albert Demoustier, lyricist and writer (born 1760)
- March 14 – Christian Friedrich Penzel, composer, 63
- March 21 – Andrea Luchesi, composer, 59
- March 25 – Friedrich von Hardenberg, librettist and poet (born 1772)
- May 13 – Bartholomeus Ruloffs, Dutch conductor and composer, 59
- May 14 – Johann Ernst Altenburg, composer, organist and trumpeter, 66
- August 31 – Nicola Sala, composer and music theorist, 88
- October 23 – Johann Gottlieb Naumann, conductor and composer, 60
- November – Thomas Augustine Geary, Irish composer (born 1773)
- November 9 – Carl Stamitz, composer, 56
- December 10 – Jonathan Battishill, composer of church music, 63
- date unknown
  - Antonio Rosales, Spanish composer (born c. 1740)
