= Johann Kulik =

Prague-based luthier

Johann (Jan) Kulik (January 14, 1800 – May 5, 1872) considered one of the best Prague makers luthiers of the 19th century.

== Biography ==
Born in Domasin (at Benesov, in Central Bohemia in Czechia), just 35 miles away from Prague. He learned violin making with Karel Sembera in Prague. By 1820, moved to Vienna to work as an apprentice for Martin Stöss. In 1824 he opened his own shop in Prague. On 26 July 1831 Kulik became a member of the Prague's bourgeois. According to Prague archives, Kulik was married twice. Had nine children from the two marriages. His assistant Antonin Sitt married Kulik's daughter Zofie Vorsila in 1848. He moved his shop location twelve times before settling in his own house in Prague's Karlin district, Palackeho av. 62.

Among his pupils were Jos. Barchanek and J. B. Dvorak (who was his disciple). One of the finest examples of his work, is a violin that was owned by the New York violin dealer and collector Roger Nestor Chittolini.

== Workmanship ==
To author and violin maker Walter Hamma, Kulik's workforce is exemplary at all times, and that his scrolls are the "most beautiful and an always pretty material. The varnish is mostly thick and hard but transparent. Superb choice of woods." Kulik based his models always on the basis of some Italian specimen he had handled including Antonio Stradivari, Joseph Guarneri, Filius Andreae, Pietro Guarneri, and Giovanni Paolo Maggini. After 1850, he got enthusiastic about a specimen of Andrea Guarneri and henceforth followed his master almost exclusively. Some examples bear coat of arms, as they were commissioned by nobility.
