= Giovanni Battista Mancini =

Italian soprano castrato and author

Giovanni Battista Mancini (1 January 1714 – 4 January 1800) was an Italian soprano castrato, voice teacher, and author of books on singing.

Mancini was born at Ascoli Piceno, Italy. He studied singing in Naples with Leonardo Leo and in Bologna with Antonio Bernacchi. He also studied composition and counterpoint there with Giovanni Battista Martini.

He began his singing career when he was 16, appearing in both Italy and Germany. His even greater success as a teacher led to an invitation in 1757 by Empress Maria Theresia of Austria to become "k. k. Cammer-Musicus" and thereby teach her daughters singing. In 1774, in Vienna, he published an important book on singing Pensieri, e riflessioni pratiche sopra il canto figurato. His views and publications brought him into conflict with another voice teacher, Vincenzo Manfredini. He remained in Vienna and died there as "Retired Singing Master", leaving behind a considerable fortune.

== Publications ==
- Pensieri e riflessioni pratiche sopra il canto figurato. Vienna, 1774.
- Practical Reflections on the Figurative Art of Singing. Milan, 1776. Translated into English by Pietro Buzzi. Boston: The Gorham Press, 1912.
- Practical Reflections on Figured Singing. (1774). Translated into English by Edward Foreman. Champaign, IL: Pro Musica Press, 1967.
- Riflessioni pratiche sul Canto figurato. Third edition (revised, corrected and augmented). Includes musical examples. Milan: Galeazzi, 1777.
