= Family Quarrels =

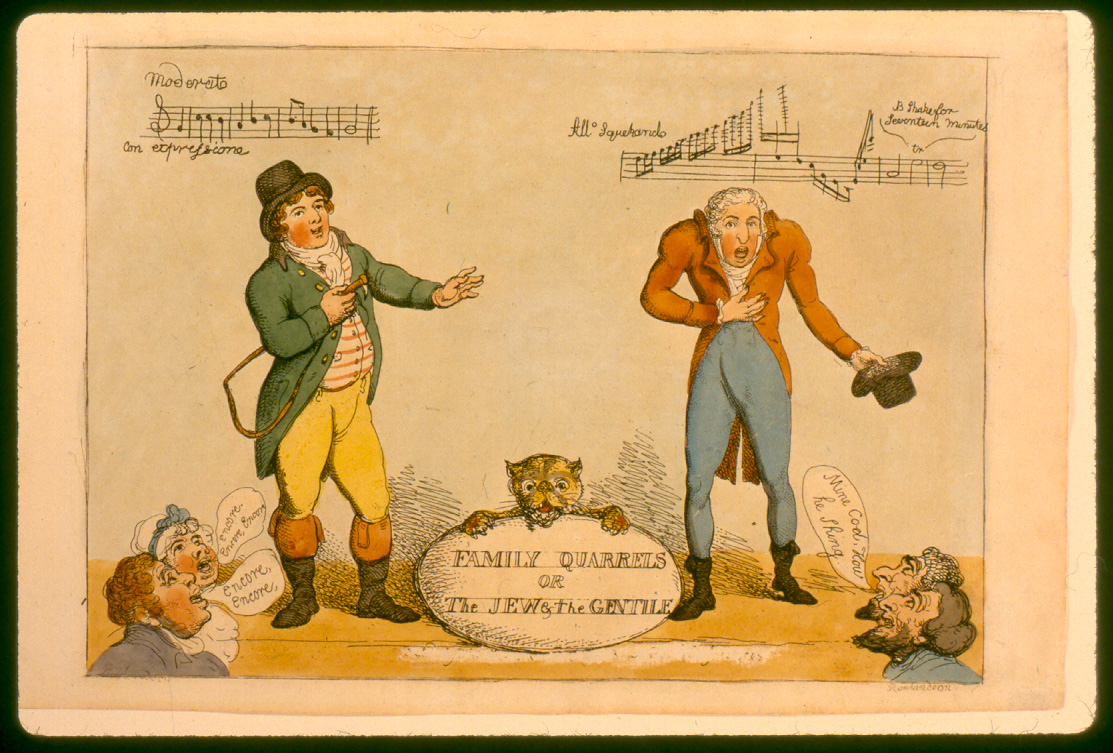
"Family Quarrels, or The Jew and the Gentile" – cartoon c. 1802 by Thomas Rowlandson depicting the singers John Braham (right) and Charles Incledon

Family Quarrels is a comic opera in three acts with a libretto by Thomas Dibdin, and music principally by William Reeve. It was premiered in London at Covent Garden Theatre on 18 December 1802. The singers John Braham and Charles Incledon had leading roles in the opera, in which the comedian John Fawcett took the part of the pedlar Proteus.

The libretto was republished in New York in 1806 "as performed at the theatres in Covent-Garden and New-York."

== Roles ==
Role	Voice type	Premiere cast, 18 December 1802
Sir Peppercorn Crabstick		
Foxglove	tenor	Charles Incledon
Charles Supplejack	tenor	John Braham
Proteus, a pedlar		John Fawcett
Argus (valet to Sir Peppercorn)		
Mushroom		
Mrs. Supplejack		
Caroline Crabstick		
Lady Selena Sugarcane		
Betty Lilly, Lady Selena's servant		
Susan (servant to the Crabsticks)	soprano	Nancy Storace
Huntsmen, gleaners, anglers

== Synopsis ==
Location: the village where the Supplejack and Crabstick families live.

Foxglove undertakes to reconcile the Supplejack and Crabstick families – Charles Supplejack and Caroline Crabstick wish to marry, but Caroline's parents (who are nouveaux riches) wish her to marry the clothier Mushroom, whilst Mrs. Supplejack's aristocratic pretensions lead her to class Caroline as too lowly. She intends to marry Charles to the widowed Lady Selena. The expected happy ending eventually ensues. The 'Jewish' episode (see below) is not the only 'ethnic' element of the story; at one point the maid Susan disguises herself as a gipsy, whilst Lady Selena's maid – who is sought after by Proteus – is Afro-Caribbean.

== Audience reaction ==
In the course of the action, Proteus disguises himself at one point as ‘Aaron the Jew’, and his song in this character recounts Aaron's problems in courting Miss Levi, Miss Rachel and Miss Moses: this provoked demonstrations, including cat-calls, from Jews in the audience. Some historians have claimed that Jews in the audience objected to the reference in the song to "three Jewish whores" or even that the performance was " a deliberate attempt [by Dibdin] to please the government...to deflect attention away from the hardship, high taxation and repression...in Britain during the French revolutionary wars". The audience reaction has sometimes been described as a "riot", or more specifically as a "Jewish riot".

However the music historian David Conway has noted that there is no evidence for the latter claim, and that the descriptions in the song of Aaron's ladies is perfectly respectable. On referring to the actual music of the song, he attributes the disturbances to the use, in the song's coda, of the melody and rhythm of the synagogue Kaddish prayer. He adds "this musical parody can in fact only have been inserted by Braham himself", as Braham was Jewish and had begun his career as a meshorrer (treble) in the Great Synagogue of London. Conway comments that the use of this sacred melody "may suggest why the Jews in the gallery (who were perhaps more regularly in attendance at synagogue) were more incensed than the gentrified Jews in the boxes, as was reported by The Morning Chronicle", and notes that the song "is the very first presentation I have discovered of genuine Jewish synagogue music in the context of Gentile stage entertainment."

Dibdin's autobiography, in a chapter entitled "And the Twelve Tribes Waxed Wroth", indicates that he included the song exactly in the hope of creating some sensational publicity. By the fourth performance, things had calmed down: Dibdin quotes the newspaper The British Press:

It was reported...that many Jews of the lower class had formed themselves into a regular phalanx, and were to renew their opposition, under the direction of the ass, whose cruel brayings were so successfully exerted the first night. No such occurrence, however, took place...the pedler's [sic] song...was encored amongst the loudest bursts of applause.

== Rowlandson's cartoon ==
Thomas Rowlandson's cartoon "Family Quarrels" depicting Braham and Incledon does not refer explicitly to the disturbances at Covent Garden, but summarizes the rivalry of these two popular favourites, contrasting Braham's floridity (marked "Allegro squeakando") with Incledon's more stolid approach to singing. In the bottom corners are seen the Jewish fans of the former and the gentile fans of the latter.
