= Antonio d'Antoni =

Italian composer (1801–1859)

Antonio d'Antoni (25 June 1801 – 18 August 1859) was an Italian opera composer and conductor.

== Life and career ==
Antonio d'Antoni was born in Palermo on 25 June 1801. He received his early music instruction from his father and grandfather who were both composers and conductors. He gained local fame at the age of 12 when he conducted his own composition, a Mass for St. Cecilia's Day (1813), which was written for mixed chorus. He was sixteen years old when he conducted the premiere of his first opera, Un duello per equivoco, ossia Gli amanti in disturbo (1817), at the Teatro Carolino in Palermo.

A friend of Meyerbeer, Bellini, and Donizetti, D'Antoni worked in England, Frankfurt, Venice, and Florence before settling in Trieste in 1824 as the conductor of a military band. During Carnival of 1825 he had a tremendous success in Trieste with his opera Amina ossia L’Orfanella di Ginevra. His opera Amazilda e Zamoro was staged at the Teatro della Pergola in Florence in 1826, but was poorly received.

In 1829, d'Antoni became the music director of Trieste's newly formed Società Filarmonico-Drammatica (Philharmonic and Dramatic Society); a position he held for only one year. He composed both the cantata Il genio di Trieste and the comédie en vaudevilles, La festa dell'archibugio (English: The Arquebus Festival), for the official inauguration of this organization on 22 June 1829. After 1830 he supported himself through work as a music teacher and as an organist at various churches in Trieste. He also worked as a keyboardist in the orchestra at the Teatro Grande. His last opera, Giovanna Grey (based on the life of Lady Jane Grey) was to be performed at the Teatro Grande in Trieste but was cancelled because of the Revolutions of 1848. It remains unperformed.

Antonio d'Antoni committed suicide in Trieste on 18 August 1859.

== Operas ==
- Un duello per equivoco, ossia Gli amanti in disturbo, premiered 1817 at the Teatro Carolino, Palermo
- Amina ossia L’Orfanella di Ginevra, premiered Carnival 1825 at the Teatro Comunale, Trieste
- Amazilda e Zamoro, premiered 1826 at the Teatro della Pergola, Florence
- Giovanna Grey, composed 1848 (unperformed)
