= William Reeve (composer) =

English theatre composer and organist

William Reeve (1757 – 22 June 1815) was an English theatre composer and organist.

== Biography ==
Reeve was born in London. He initially studied to be a law stationer but abandoned his studies in order to study the organ with a Mr Richardson of St James's, Westminster. He became an organist in Totnes, Devon in 1781. In 1783 he returned to London to work for Astley's Amphitheatre where he composed all-sung burlettas. He also composed stage works of various kinds for John Palmer's short-lived Royalty Theatre. All of his works were entirely sung as none of these non-patent houses were permitted to perform works with any spoken drama. Some of Reeve's pieces were revived at the patent theatres after the Royalty closed in 1788. Most notably, his ballet-pantomime Don Juan (1787) was incredibly popular and both Drury Lane and Covent Garden adopted it for their repertories.

In 1787 Reeve was elected to the Royal Society of Musicians and eventually served as the governor of the organization in both 1794 and 1804. Reeve occasionally worked as an actor at the Haymarket company during the late 1780s and early 1790s. He also appeared in productions at Covent Garden for two seasons (1789–91), playing minor roles for £2 a week. In the autumn of 1791, Covent Garden's house composer, William Shield, left abruptly and Reeve took over the position for £4 a week. While there he completed Shield's score for the ballet-pantomime, Oscar and Malvina (1791) in addition to composing some of his own theater works. After Shield's return in 1792 Reeve became organist of St Martin Ludgate but continued as a freelance composer for London's patent and minor theatres. He also provided much rather facile music for the topical spectacles and pantomimes at Sadler's Wells. During Lent of 1794 he was engaged at the Lyceum Theatre for four nights a week, producing Mirth's Museum, a variety entertainment. He served a second term as Covent Garden's house composer during 1797–8 and began collaborating with other composers. In 1802 he wrote the music for Thomas John Dibdin's comic opera, Family Quarrels.

From 1803 until his death Reeve also served as co-proprietor, director of music, and shareholder of Sadler's Wells Aquatic Theatre, where he set about 80 librettos, many written by co-proprietor Charles Dibdin the younger. Because of the success at Drury Lane of Reeve's comic opera The Caravan (1803), which featured an on-stage water tank into which Carlos the wonder dog leaped to rescue a drowning child, Sadler's Wells installed an irregularly shaped 8000-gallon tank, three feet deep, beneath the stage. Reeve wrote music for the new specialty, ‘aquadrama’: all-sung musicals featuring pirates, waterfalls, nautical battles, ocean fiends and other watery terrors.

Reeve wrote largely to support and highlight the talents of specific performers, such as the clown Joseph Grimaldi at Sadler's Wells, and to provide easy listening. He could rapidly compose strophic comic songs in the popular Scottish style and compile scores based on genuine ballads and folksongs. Reviewers found his music entertaining. Some of his other popular later works included a melodrama, The Purse (1794), a Robin Hood pantomime, Merry Sherwood (1795) (especially the drinking song I am a friar of orders grey) and a comic opera, The Cabinet (1802). At the time of his death in London, Reeve owned seven of Sadler's Wells's 40 shares, which he bequeathed to his daughter, Charlotte. His family pursued theatrical careers as well: his wife Mrs. Reeve sang at Astley's and in Mirth's Museum, his daughter Charlotte was an actress, and his son George composed for Sadler's Wells and played the trumpet. A portrait of Reeve engraved by J. Hopwood (after E. Smith) appears in the libretto to The Cabinet.

== Selected stage works ==
- The Purse (1794)
- British Fortitude (1794)
- The Apparition (1794)
- The Charity Boy (1796)
- Bantry Bay (1797)
- The Raft (1798)
- Harlequin's Return (1798)
- Ramah Droog (1798)
- The Embarkation (1799)
- The Turnpike Gate (1799)
- Paul and Virginia (1800)
- The Blind Girl (1801)
- The Chains of the Heart (1801)
- Jamie and Anna (c.1801)
- The Cabinet (1802)
- Family Quarrels (1802)
- The Caravan (1803)
- Out of Place (1805)
- Thirty Thousand, or Who's the Richest? (1804)
- Kais (1808)
- The White Witch (1808)
- The Magic Minstrel (1808)
- Oscar and Malvina, or The Hall of Fingal (1810)
- The Red Reaver (1811)
- The Council of Ten (1811)
- Rokeby Castle (1813)
- Who's to have her? (1813)
- Narensky, or The Road to Yaroslaf (1814)
- The Farmer's Wife (1814)
- The Corsair (1814)
- Brother and Sister (1815)

== Sources ==
- Linda Troost: "William Reeve", Grove Music Online ed. L. Macy (Accessed September 20, 2008), (subscription access)
- The Oxford Dictionary of Opera, by John Warrack and Ewan West (1992), ISBN 0-19-869164-5
