= Jean-Baptiste Duvernoy =

French pianist and composer

Jean-Baptiste Duvernoy (c. 1802 – c. 1880) was a French pianist and composer of the Romantic period.

He is best known for his Elementary Studies, Op. 176, and The School of Mechanism, Op. 120.

Duvernoy also wrote many other studies designed to help finger co-ordination.
