= Johann Joseph Neidl =

Austrian engraver and coppersmith (1776–1832)

- Born: Johann Joseph Neidl; 20 March 1776; Graz, Duchy of Styria
- Died: 31 August 1832 (aged 56); Pest, Budapest, Hungary
- Occupation: Engraver
- Known for: Stipple engraving; Printmaking

Johann Joseph Neidl (20 March 1776 – 31 August 1832) was an Austrian engraver, coppersmith, and printmaker who was active in Frankfurt, Vienna, and Munich.

== Early life and education ==
Johann Joseph (or Josef) Neidl was born and christened on 20 March 1776 in Graz, Duchy of Styria, part of the Habsburg monarchy (now Austria). Born into a servant's family, he apprenticed as a silversmith while dedicating his spare time to drawing and carefully replicating copperplate engravings.

Under the patronage of Count Wieser, he was sent to Frankfurt for formal training with the German engraver Johann Gottlieb Prestel. Studying copperplate engraving under Prestel, he resided in Frankfurt, Germany. After the French invasion of Germany, his patron moved him to Munich, where Neidl visited galleries and honed his drawing skills. In 1793, the count sent him to Augsburg to study with Johannes Gottlieb Glauber. After the death of his patron in 1794, Neidl returned to Munich, attended the academy, and continued his studies under Glauber.

== Career ==
Neidl went to Vienna (then the capital of the Habsburg monarchy) and set up an art shop at the turn of the 18th century. He specialized in copper engravings, and he also ventured into foreign markets. In Vienna in 1799, he engraved a portrait of Archduke Karl of Austria after a painting by Joseph Kreutzinger.

He was commissioned to do stipple engraving for the music publishing firm of Artaria & Co. Around 1800, Neidl created a gouache portrait of Haydn for Artaria. He also engraved a portrait of Italian composer Luigi Cherubini, published by Artaria in Vienna, around 1800. He went on to contribute several actor portraits to the theater almanacs published by Wallishauser in Vienna.

In 1802, Neidl produced an engraving of Ludwig van Beethoven after a drawing by Gandolph Ernst Stainhauser. Neidl later engraved a portrait of German composer Carl Maria von Weber based on a painting by Joseph Lange in 1804.

Alongside his other works, Neidl published a drawing book for ladies, inspired by the drawings of Füger and Caucig.

Some of Neidl's prints are preserved in the British Museum of London.

== Death ==
Johann Joseph Neidl died on 31 August 1832 in Pest, Budapest, Hungary.

== Gallery ==
Works by Johann Joseph Neidl

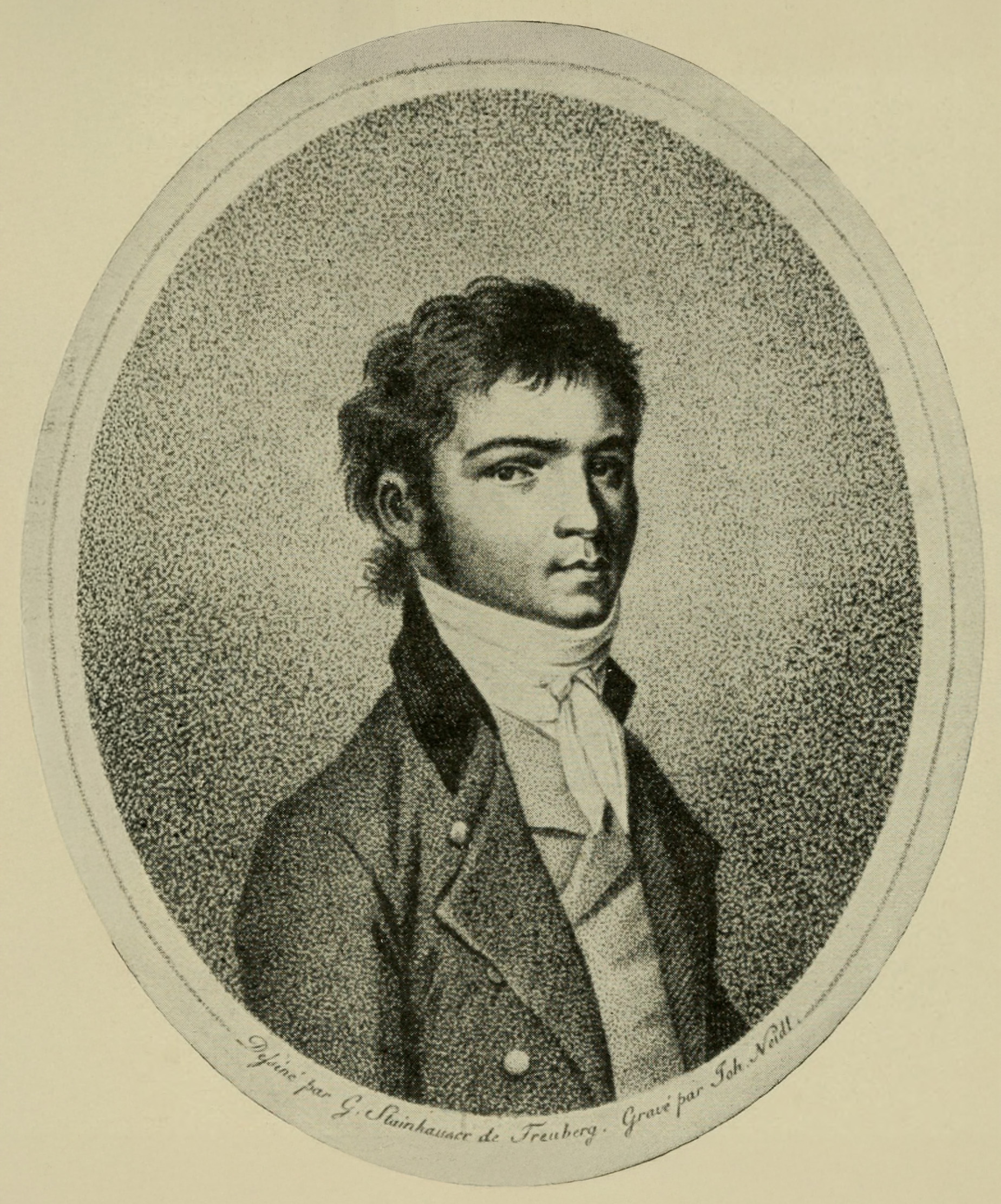
Ludwig van Beethoven

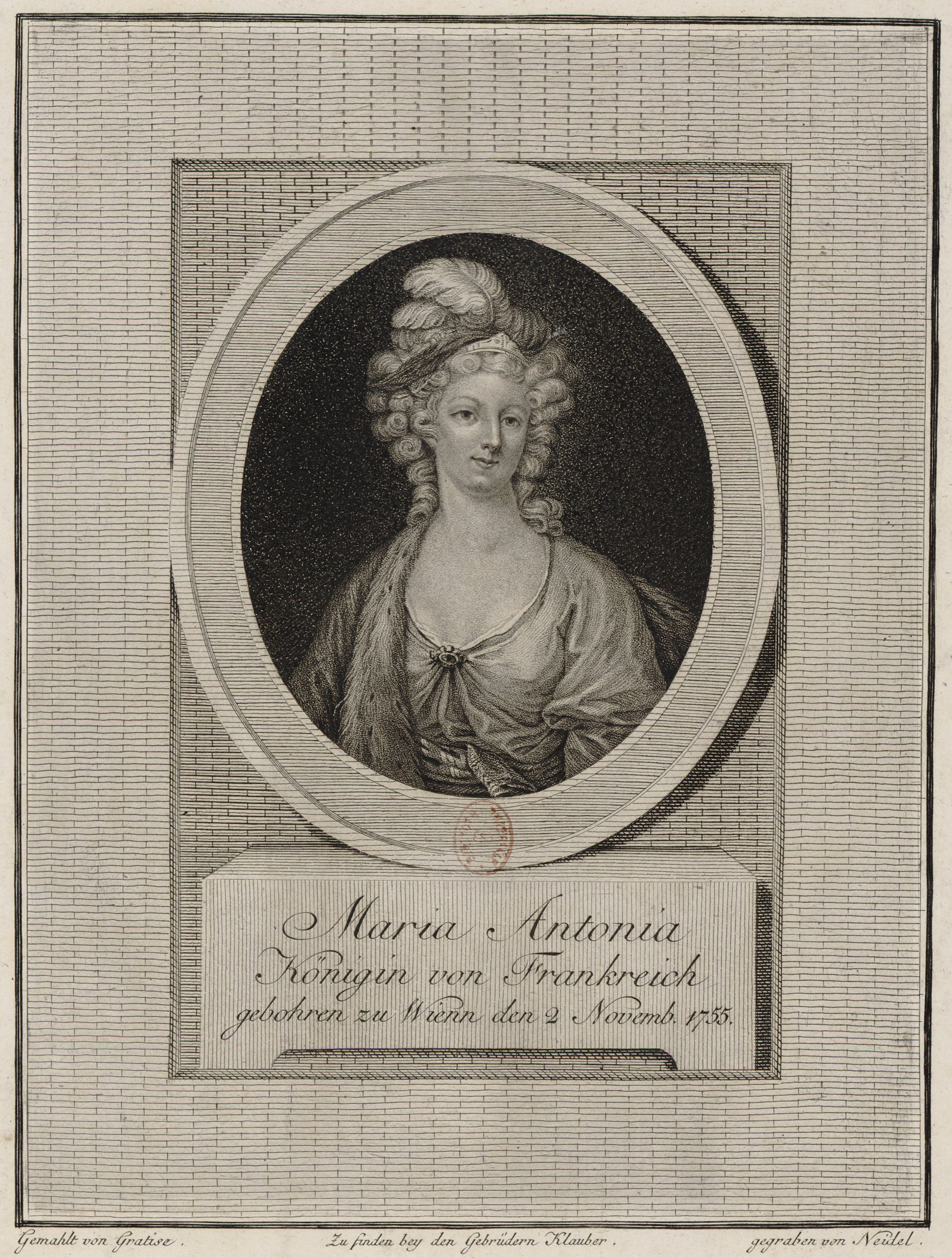
Marie Antoinette

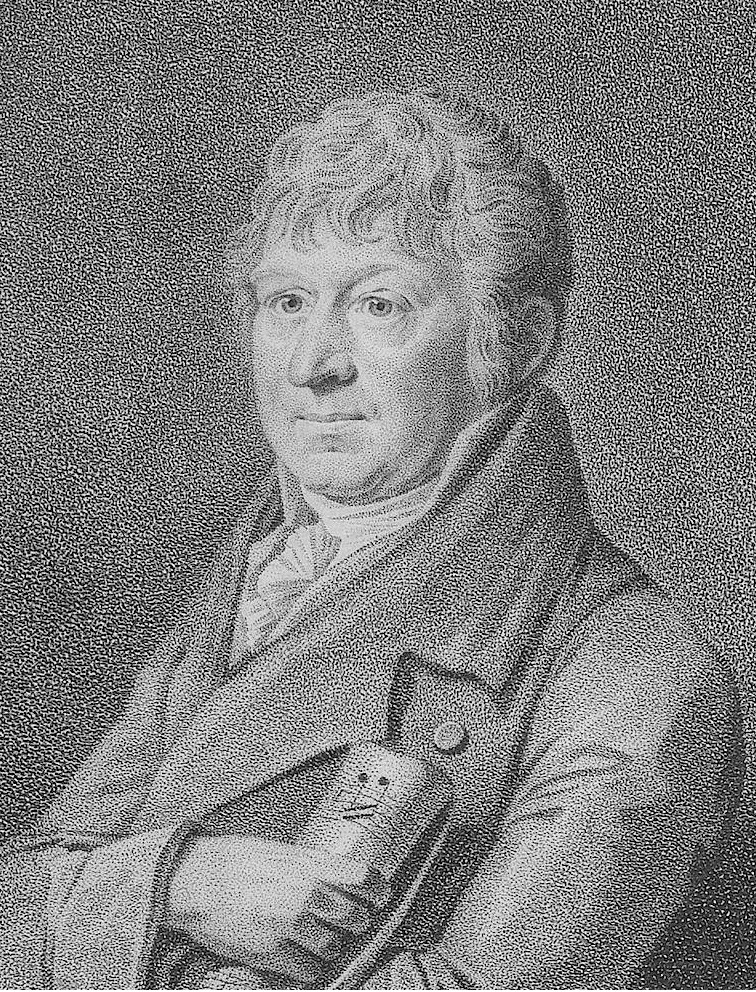
Franz Krommer

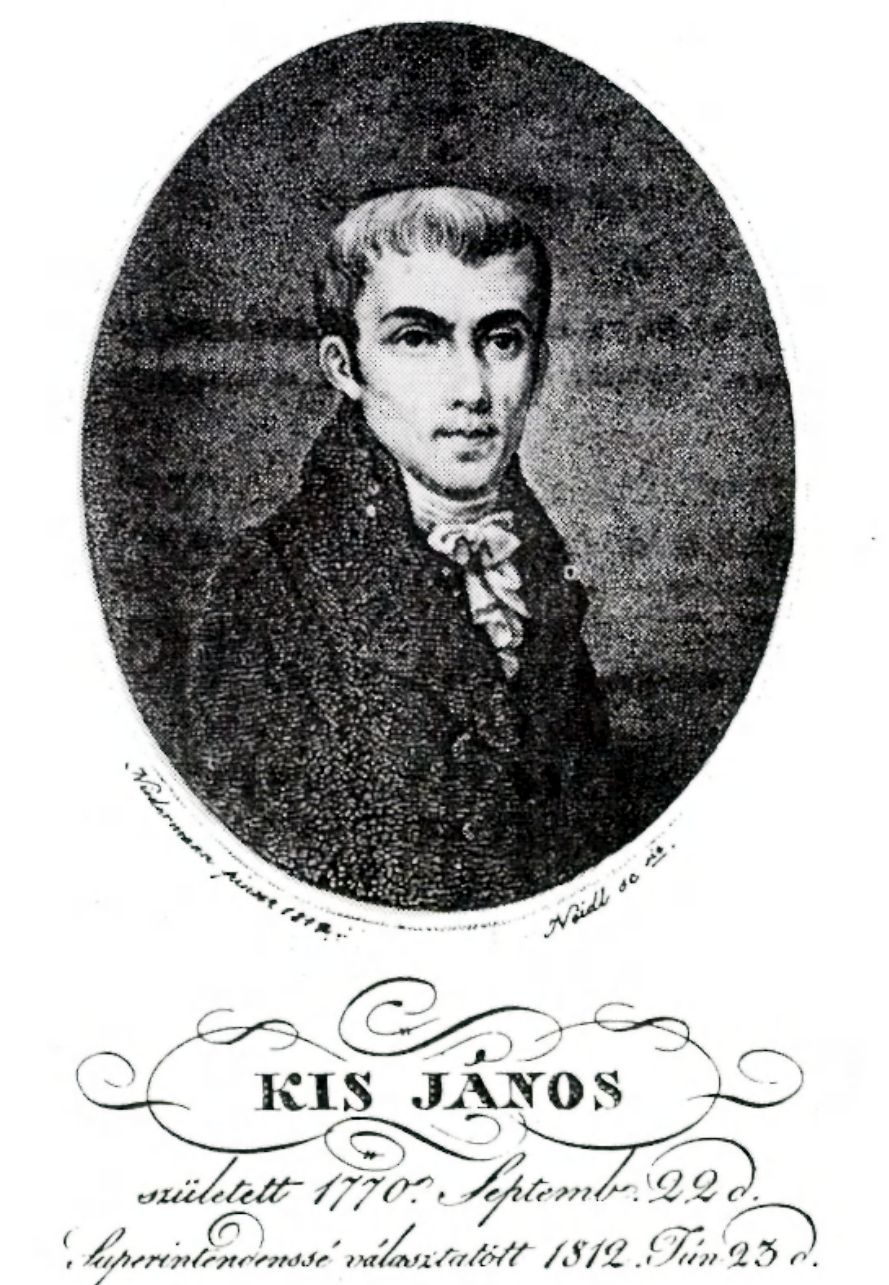
János Kis

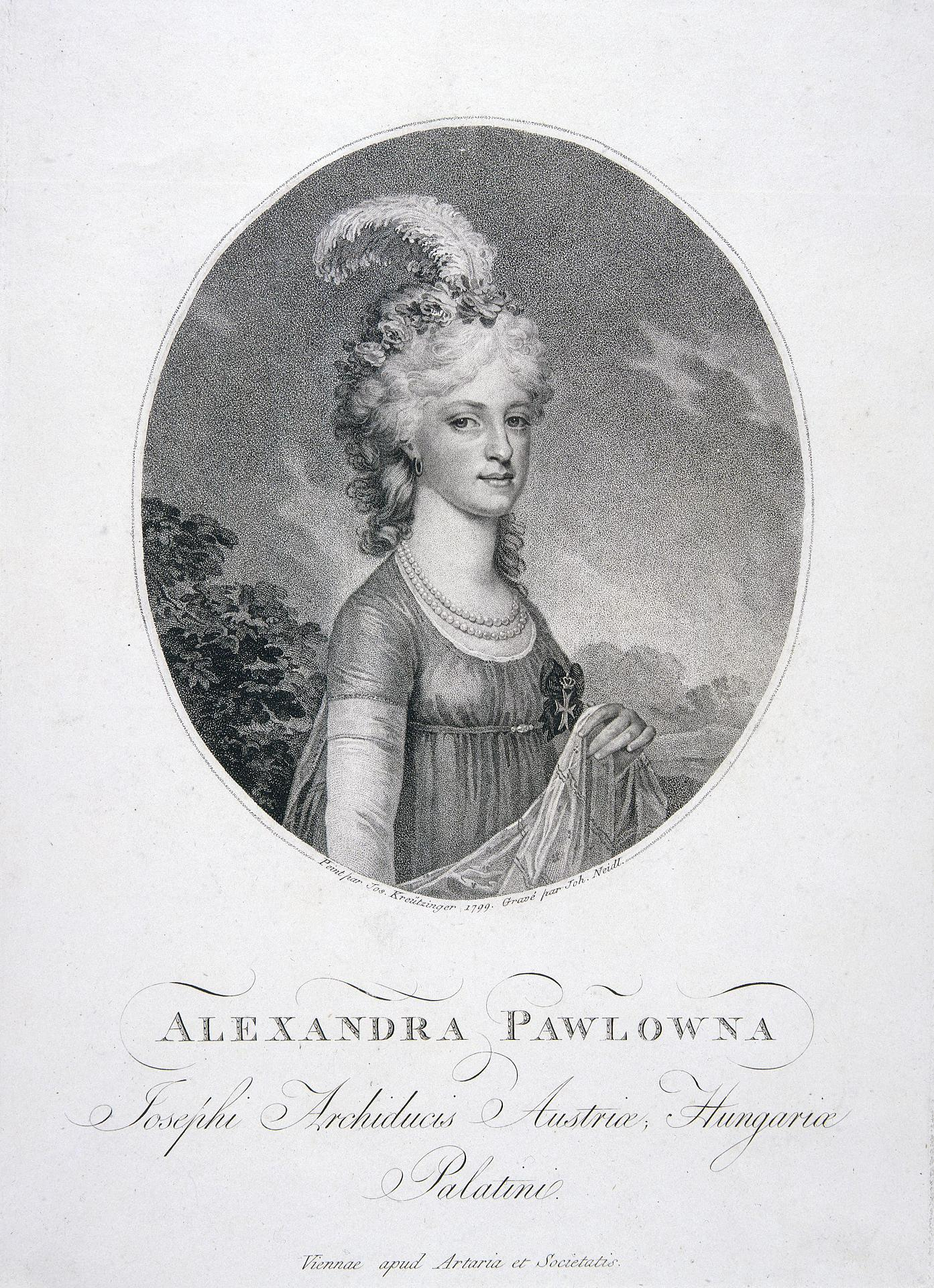
Alexandra Pavlovna

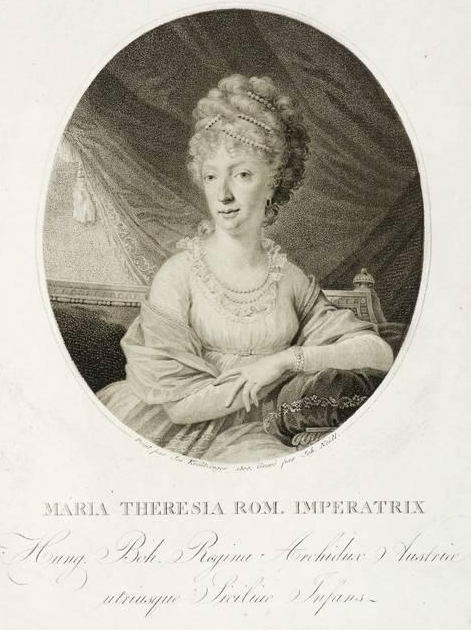
Maria Theresa

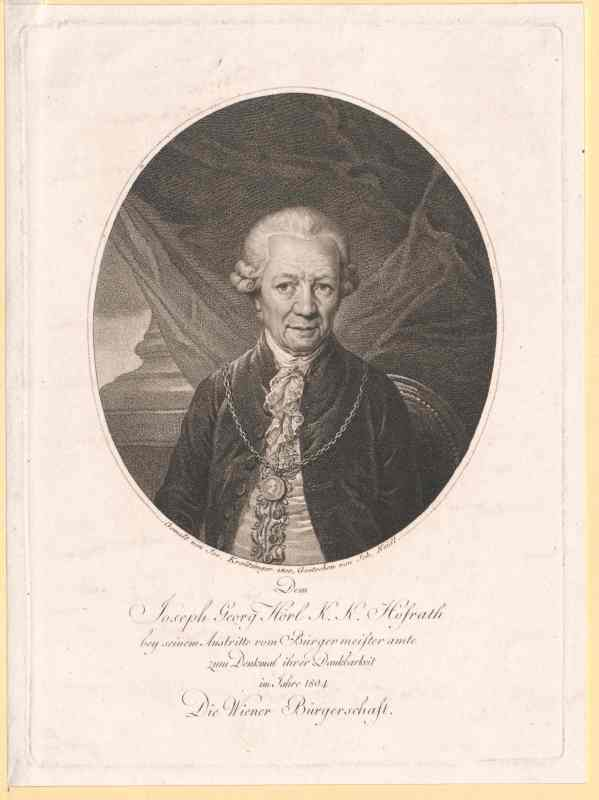
Josef Georg Hörl
