= August Ferdinand Anacker =

German composer (1790–1854)

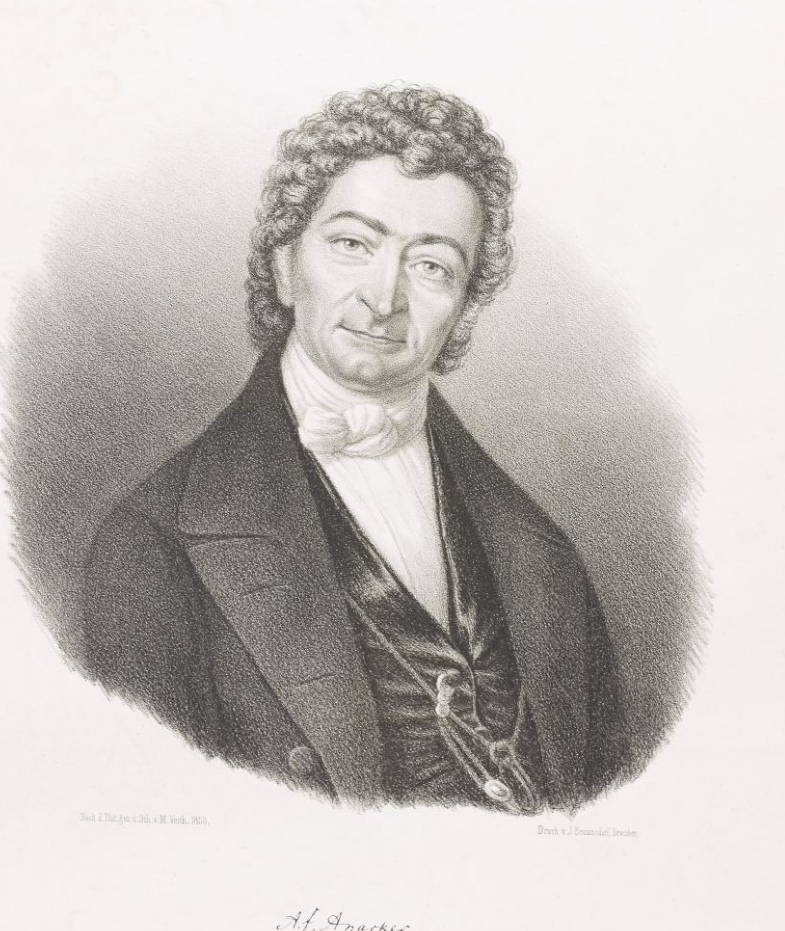
August Ferdinand Anacker

August Ferdinand Anacker (17 October 1790 – 21 August 1854) was a German composer.

Anacker, the son of a poor shoemaker, was born in Freiberg, Electorate of Saxony, Holy Roman Empire. He attended the Gymnasium in Freiberg before going to Leipzig in 1813 to study music with Johann Gottfried Schicht and Friedrich Schneider. In 1822, he became a cantor and conductor in his hometown, where he distinguished himself as a teacher and composer, establishing and managing a number of musical institutions in a career spanning several decades. He died in Freiberg.

Of his many compositions for voice and instrumental accompaniment, the cantata Der Bergmannsgruß enjoyed the greatest popularity, notably including 13 Russian horns.
