= 1807 in music =

This is a list of music-related events in 1807.

== Events ==
- Muzio Clementi begins negotiating for British publication rights to the music of Ludwig van Beethoven

== Classical music ==
- Ludwig van Beethoven
  - Piano Concerto No.4, Op.58 (Premiered in March in Vienna at a private concert)
  - Piano Concerto in D major, Op. 61a
  - Coriolan, Op.62
  - Symphony No.5, Op. 67 (composition begins)
  - Mass in C, Op. 86
  - 6 Ecossaises, WoO 83
- Johann Baptist Cramer
  - Piano Concerto No.5, Op. 48
  - Studio per il pianoforte, Op. 50, Book 2
- Anton Eberl – Piano Quintet in G minor, Op. 41
- Joseph Eybler – Omnes de Saba venient
- Johann Nepomuk Hummel – Hélène and Paris (ballet)
- Franz Krommer – Harmonie in F major, Op.57
- Wenzel Thomas Matiegka – Serenade for Flute, Viola and Guitar, Op. 26
- Antoine Reicha
  - Grand Quintet, Op. 106
  - Trio for 3 Cellos
- Ferdinand Ries – Cello Sonata in A major, Op. 21
- Louis Spohr
  - Violin Concerto No.5, Op. 17
  - Potpourri No.2, Op. 22
  - Fantasia for Harp, Op. 35
  - Variations sur 'Je suis encore dans mon printemps', Op. 36
- Daniel Steibelt – Harp Concerto
- Carl Maria von Weber – Symphony No. 1

== Published popular music ==
- Thomas Moore – Irish melodies (music by John Andrew Stevenson)

== Opera ==
- Etienne-Nicolas Méhul – Joseph (Premiered December 15 in Paris)
- Gaspare Spontini – La Vestale (The Vestal Virgin) (first performed in Paris, Libretto by Etienne Jouy.)

== Births ==
- January 6 – Ludwig Erk, music teacher and composer (died 1883)
- January 11 – Charles Jefferys, music publisher and lyricist (died 1865)
- January 23 – Joseph Casavant, manufacturer of pipe organs (d. 1874)
- February 14 – Ernest Legouvé, librettist and dramatist (died 1903)
- February 15 – Ignacy Feliks Dobrzyński, Polish symphonist (d. 1867)
- February 27 – Henry Wadsworth Longfellow, lyricist and poet (died 1882)
- March 7 – Adolph Methfessel, German composer (d. 1878)
- March 30 – Henrik Rung, composer (d. 1871)
- June 6 – Adrien-François Servais, cellist (d. 1866)
- September 11 – Ignaz Lachner (d. 1895)
- October 15 – Jan van Boom, composer (died 1872)
- October 21 – Hilarión Eslava, composer (died 1878)
- October 22 – Nikolay Bakhmetev, composer (died 1891)
- date unknown
  - James P. Clarke, composer (d. 1877)
  - Henriette von Schorn, lyricist and poet (died 1869)

== Deaths ==
- February 25 – Jeanne-Marie Marsan, actress and singer (b. 1746)
- March 1 – Niel Gow, fiddler (b. 1727)
- March 11 – Anton Eberl, pianist, composer and music teacher (b. 1765)
- March 27 – Michele Mortellari, composer (born c. 1750)
- June 15 – Charles Bernardy, dancer and choreographer (b. 1724)
- June 16 – John Skinner, songwriter (b. 1721)
- December 21 – John Newton, author of the hymn, Amazing Grace (b. 1725)
