= 1806 in music =

This is a list of music-related events in 1806.

== Events ==
- Gioachino Rossini becomes the youngest member of the Philharmonics Society of Bologna, where he starts studying composition
- Carl Czerny publishes his first composition at the age of 15.
- The marimba is described for the first time by Juan Domingo Juarros, a Spanish historian, in his Compendium of the History of Guatemala.
- Johann Simon Mayr founds a new music school at Bergamo, Italy. Gaetano Donizetti is one of its first pupils.
- Marcussen & Søn, Danish organ-building firm, founded.
- The poem "Twinkle Twinkle Little Star" is published in Rhymes for the Nursery; it would later be made into a popular song of the same name.

== Classical music ==
- Ludwig van Beethoven
  - Symphony No. 4
  - Piano Concerto No. 4
  - Violin Concerto
  - 3 String Quartets, Op. 59
  - 32 Variations in C minor
- Johann Nepomuk Hummel
  - 7 Hungarian Dances
  - 12 Minuets
- Carl Maria von Weber – Concertino for Horn and Orchestra
- Joseph Wölfl – Piano Concerto No. 5 "Grand Concerto Militaire", Op. 43

== Opera ==
- Étienne Méhul – Uthal

== Births ==
- January 3 – Henriette Sontag, operatic soprano (d. 1854)
- January 27 – Juan Crisóstomo Arriaga, "the Spanish Mozart" (d. 1826)
- March 3 – Giuseppe Mazza, composer, conductor, and organist (d. 1885)
- August 17 – Johann Kaspar Mertz, guitarist and composer (d. 1856)
- September 2 – Josef Gusikov, klezmer musician (d. 1837)
- November 4 – Anders Selinder, dancer and choreographer (d. 1874)
- December 4 – Johann Friedrich Franz Burgmüller, composer (d. 1874)

== Deaths ==
- January 30 – Vicente Martín y Soler, opera and ballet composer (b. 1754)
- February 18 – Brigida Banti, operatic soprano (b. 1755)
- February 23 – John Alcock, composer (b. 1715)
- February 24 – Tommaso Giordani, composer (b. c. 1738)
- March 16 – Giuseppe Colla, composer (b. 1731)
- March 23 – George Pinto, composer (b. 1785)
- June 14 – Domenico Guardasoni, operatic tenor (b. c.1731)
- June 18 – Antoine Lacroix, French composer and violinist (b. 1756)
- August 10 – Michael Haydn, composer (b. 1737)
- date unknown
  - José de Larrañaga, organist and composer (b. 1728)
  - Charles Le Picq, dancer and choreographer (b. 1744)
