= Court chapel =

A court chapel (German: Hofkapelle) is a chapel (building) and/or a chapel as a musical ensemble associated with a royal or noble court. Most of these are royal (court) chapels, but when the ruler of the court is not a king, the more generic "court chapel" is used, for instance for an imperial court.

In German, the term Hofkapelle (literally, "court chapel") is used for both a royal chapel and any other court chapel.

As a musical venture, court chapels emerged in 16th-century Europe, largely due to the consolidation of more itinerant musical groups initiated by the dukes of Burgundy and their Imperial successors in the 15th century. There was a double objective: assuring the continuity and stability of religious ceremony, and showcasing splendour and artistic taste of the court. The chapels and palaces that were built at the time exhibited the same splendour, and served the same goals.

== Imperial Russia ==
A court chapel was established in Moscow in 1479 for singing at church services and court ceremonies. Under Peter the Great the choir was a part of the court clergy. The choir moved to Saint Petersburg when the new capital was founded in 1703. In 1741 the choristers moved from Posadskaya Street to the Old Winter Palace. They were known as the Court Choral Capella from 1763, and extended to 72 singers in 1764. From 1765 the Russian court was successful in attracting several famous Italian composers to Saint Petersburg, among them Baldassare Galuppi, Giovanni Paisiello, Vicente Martín y Soler and Domenico Cimarosa. Foreign instrumentalists employed at the court included the violinist Anton Ferdinand Titz. Besides continuing their church duties, choristers sang at secular ceremonies and in the opera. They moved to the Moika River Embankment, next to the Novy Bridge, in a house that was built in 1773-77. The house was rebuilt in 1810, and a modest concert hall was added in 1830. Throughout the 19th century the chapel included instrumentalists. Russian composers involved with the Imperial Chapel in the 19th century included Mikhail Glinka, Mily Balakirev and Nikolai Rimsky-Korsakov. In the late 1880s the house and concert hall at the Moika River Embankement were rebuilt and enlarged to what in the 20th century became known as the Leningrad Academic Glinka Capella. The choir became secularized and mixed in 1920, after losing its court epithet shortly after the Russian Revolution (1917).

== German language regions ==
The first noble or royal court orchestras in German language regions, most of which were founded in the sixteenth century, were called Hofkapelle. When the noble and royal courts dissipated the name was often replaced by Staatskapelle ("State Chapel"), usually indicating an orchestra with a prior tradition as Hofkapelle.

=== Hofkapelle Dresden ===
As a musical institute the Dresden Hofkapelle originated in 1548. It was a top European vocal and instrumental ensemble during the period the Saxon Electors also ruled Poland (1697-1763). From 1708 the Court Chapel was housed in the former Opernhaus am Taschenberg, as a public church, until the construction of the new Hofkirche ("court church") was finished in 1751.

=== Hofkapelle Mannheim ===
The Mannheim Palace Church was the Old Catholic court chapel for the prince-electors of the Electorate of the Palatinate between 1731 and 1777. Best known composer of the court chapel is Johann Stamitz, founder of the Mannheim school around 1750.

=== Münchner Hofkapelle ===
The Munich court chapel was arguably the most splendid one of the second half of the 16th century, and played an important role in the European music life of its day. Orlandus Lassus was the best known musician hired by the Bavarian dukes.

The Hofkapelle München, an orchestra founded in 2009, is a private initiative referring to the previous fame of the Hofkapelle in that city.

=== Hofkapelle Stuttgart ===
The Hofkapelle Stuttgart was the court chapel of the Württemberg dynasty in Germany. It existed in several formations since it was founded in the 16th century. In the early 19th century musicians like Conradin Kreutzer, Johann Nepomuk Hummel and Carl Maria von Weber were employed at the Hofkapelle. In 2002 a new ensemble, under the same name, was founded by Frieder Bernius.

=== Hofkapelle Weimar ===
With a history going back to 1482 notable musicians employed in the Hofkapelle include Johann Sebastian Bach in the early 18th century, and chapel masters such as Johann Nepomuk Hummel, Franz Liszt and Richard Strauss in the 19th century. The court chapel of Schloss Weimar where Bach worked was built in 1630. After a fire in 1774, the west wing of the palace, with the chapel, reopened in 1847.

After the first World War, the musical ensemble was renamed Staatkapelle, ultimately known as Deutsches Nationaltheater and Staatskapelle Weimar.

=== Hofburg chapel, Vienna ===
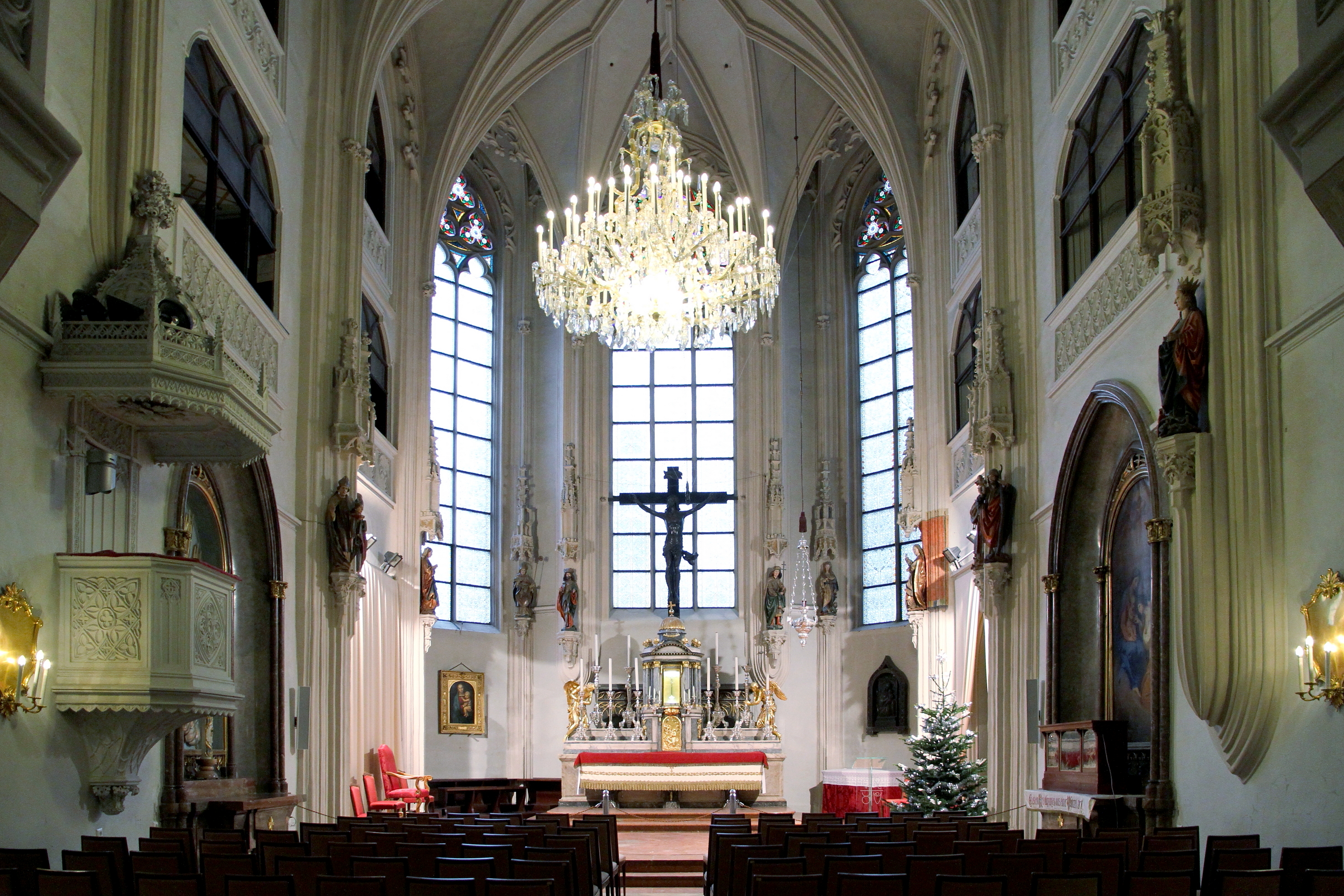
The Hofburg chapel, Vienna

Following the collapse of the monarchy the Choir, part of the Hofkapelle, was disbanded in 1920. In 1924 the choir was reinstated as the Vienna Boys Choir and permanently settled in the Imperial Court Chapel, the Hofkapelle of the Hofburg Palace. The Hofburg Boys Choir was subsidised by the Royal Private School. After 1926, to consolidate the financial position of the Vienna Boys Choir, the Royal Court Chapel organised a wide range of singing engagements outside their own programme. The Choir remains in worldwide demand well into the 21st century.

=== Other Hofkapelle buildings ===
- Hofkapelle of the Würzburg Residence

== Other court musical ensembles ==
Other musical chapels associated with a court include the former court chapel in Brussels and the capilla flamenca associated with the Spanish imperial court.
