= Court chapel (disambiguation) =

Court chapel, or its equivalent in other languages (like Hofkapelle in German), may refer to:

== Buildings ==
- Mannheim Palace Church, founded as a court chapel
- Opernhaus am Taschenberg (sometimes indicated as "Hofkapelle"), which served as the Catholic Hofkirche (court church) in Dresden from 1708 to 1751
- Tottenham Court Chapel, a.k.a. Whitefield's Tabernacle, Tottenham Court Road, UK
- Hofkapelle of Schloss Weimar, in Weimar, Thuringia, Germany
- Hofkapelle of the Hofburg Palace, Vienna
- Hofkapelle of the Würzburg Residence, in Würzburg, Lower Franconia, Germany

== Musical ensembles ==
- Capilla flamenca (Spain), or Flemish chapel, associated with the Spanish imperial court
- Hannoversche Hofkapelle, a court orchestra in Hannover, Germany
- Saint Petersburg Court Chapel, Russian imperial court chapel
- Hofkapelle Stuttgart, a German orchestra based in Stuttgart

== See also ==
- Royal chapel (disambiguation)
- Staatskapelle (disambiguation)
