= Zumsteeg =

Zumsteeg is a surname. Notable people with the surname include:

- Emilie Zumsteeg (1796–1857), German choir conductor, songwriter, singer, composer, and pianist, daughter of Johann
- Johann Rudolf Zumsteeg (1760–1802), German composer and conductor
