= Attilio Regolo =

Attilio Regolo may refer to:

- Marcus Atilius Regulus (d. 250 BC), Roman general
- Marco Attilio Regolo, opera by Alessandro Scarlatti to libretto by Matteo Noris, Rome 1719
- Attilio Regolo, 1740 libretto by Metastasio
- Attilio Regolo (Hasse), first setting of the Metastasio libretto, Dresden 1750
- Attilio Regolo, opera by Niccolò Jommelli, London 1753
- French cruiser Châteaurenault (D 606) (1948–1961), the rebuilt Italian cruiser Attilio Regolo, a Capitani Romani-class cruiser, ceded as war reparations.
