= Palatine Chapel =

Palatine Chapel may refer to:

Belgium

- Gravenkapel in Kortrijk

Germany

- Palatine Chapel, Aachen

Italy

- Palatine Chapel, Broletto in the Palace of Broletto, Brescia
- Palatine Chapel, Caserta in the Palace of Caserta
- Palatine Chapel, Napoli in the Royal Palace of Naples
- Cappella Palatina in Palermo, Sicily

== See also ==
- Royal chapel (disambiguation)
- Palatine
