= Royal chapel =

Chapel associated with a monarch, a royal court, or in a royal palace

A royal chapel is a chapel associated with a monarch, a royal court, or in a royal palace.

A royal chapel may also be a body of clergy or musicians serving at a royal court or employed by a monarch.

== Commonwealth countries ==
Both the United Kingdom and Canada have a tradition of Chapels Royal.

== German language countries ==
The first noble or royal court orchestras in German language regions, most of which were founded in the sixteenth century, were called Hofkapelle. When the noble and royal courts dissipated the name was often replaced by Staatskapelle ("State Chapel"), usually indicating an orchestra with a prior tradition as Hofkapelle.

The Vienna Boys Choir replaced the former Hofkapelle at the Austrian Hofburg four years after the original musical ensemble was disbanded in 1920, following the collapse of the monarchy.

== Other European royal courts ==
=== Denmark ===
Choir of the Chapel Royal, Copenhagen.

Det Kongelige Kapel / Royal Danish Orchestra

=== France ===
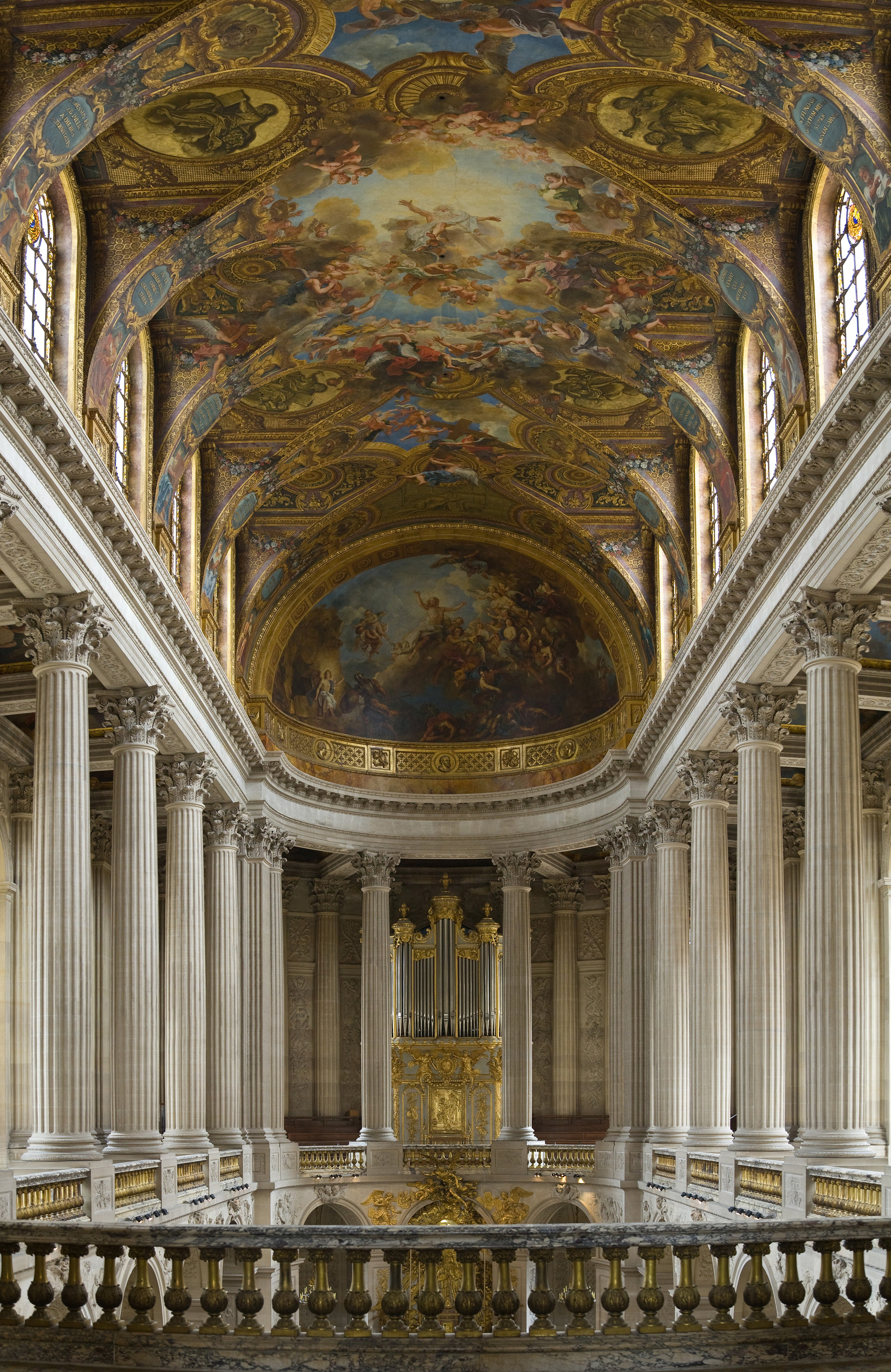
Versailles' chapel as seen from the tribune royale, where the king and members of the royal family heard Mass

The musical establishment attached to the royal chapel of the French kings, the Chapel Royal was founded in the time of the Merovingian kings and reached its zenith under the Old Regime. Under the direction of a clergyman, the Master of the Chapel, the staff included undermasters in charge of rehearsals and the composition of royal masses, an organist, cornetists and around thirty singers and choristers, as well as masters who taught music to the children.

The establishment grew during the reign of Louis XIV to include castrati and women, and the many instruments needed to perform motets. By the death of King Louis XIV, in 1715, the Chapel Royal had a total of 110 singers (sopranos, castrati, haute-contres, tenors, baritones and bass) and 20 instrumentalists (violin and viola, bass violin, theorbo, flute, oboe, bass cromorne, serpent and bassoon)
Chapelle du château de Versailles

=== Italy ===
The Chapel Royal of Naples, under the rule of Aragon, then of Habsburg Spain, the Bourbons and finally Joseph Napoleon, was the centre of sacred music in southern Italy.

=== Spain ===
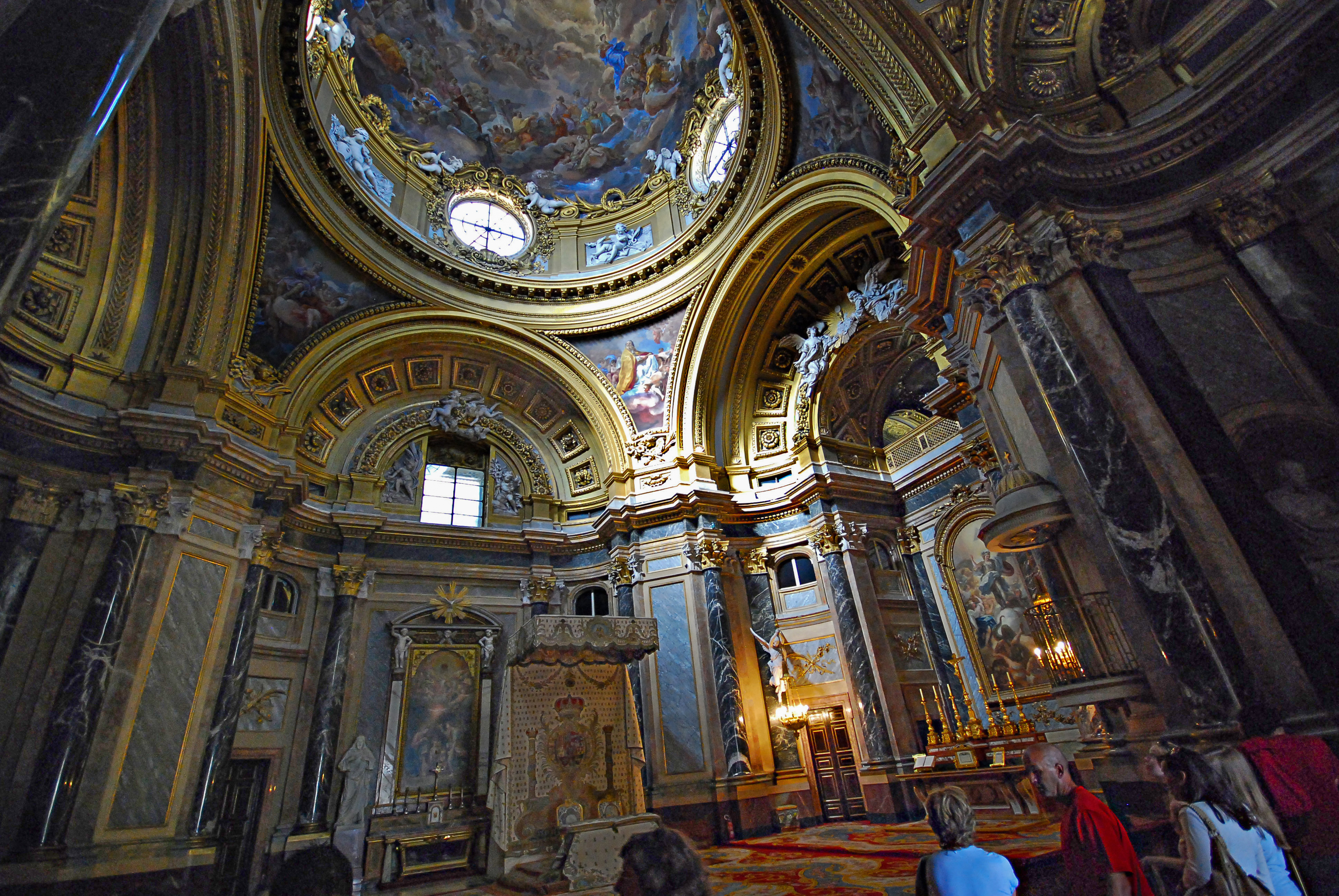
The Royal Palace of Madrid

There are several chapels in Spain designated by the sovereign as chapels royal (Spanish: Capilla Real), including the Royal Chapel at the Royal Palace of Madrid and the Royal Chapel of Granada.

Formerly, the Flemish chapel was used separately by the Spanish kings and queens (who also ruled parts of the Low Countries in the 16th century) through the reigns of Charles V, Philip II, Philip III, and Philip IV, until 1637, when it was merged into the capilla real española.

=== Sweden ===
The Royal Chapel, Stockholm.

== Other courts ==
Other courts, like the Imperial ones, could have court chapels similar to the Royal ones.
