= Johann Franz Xaver Sterkel =

German composer and pianist

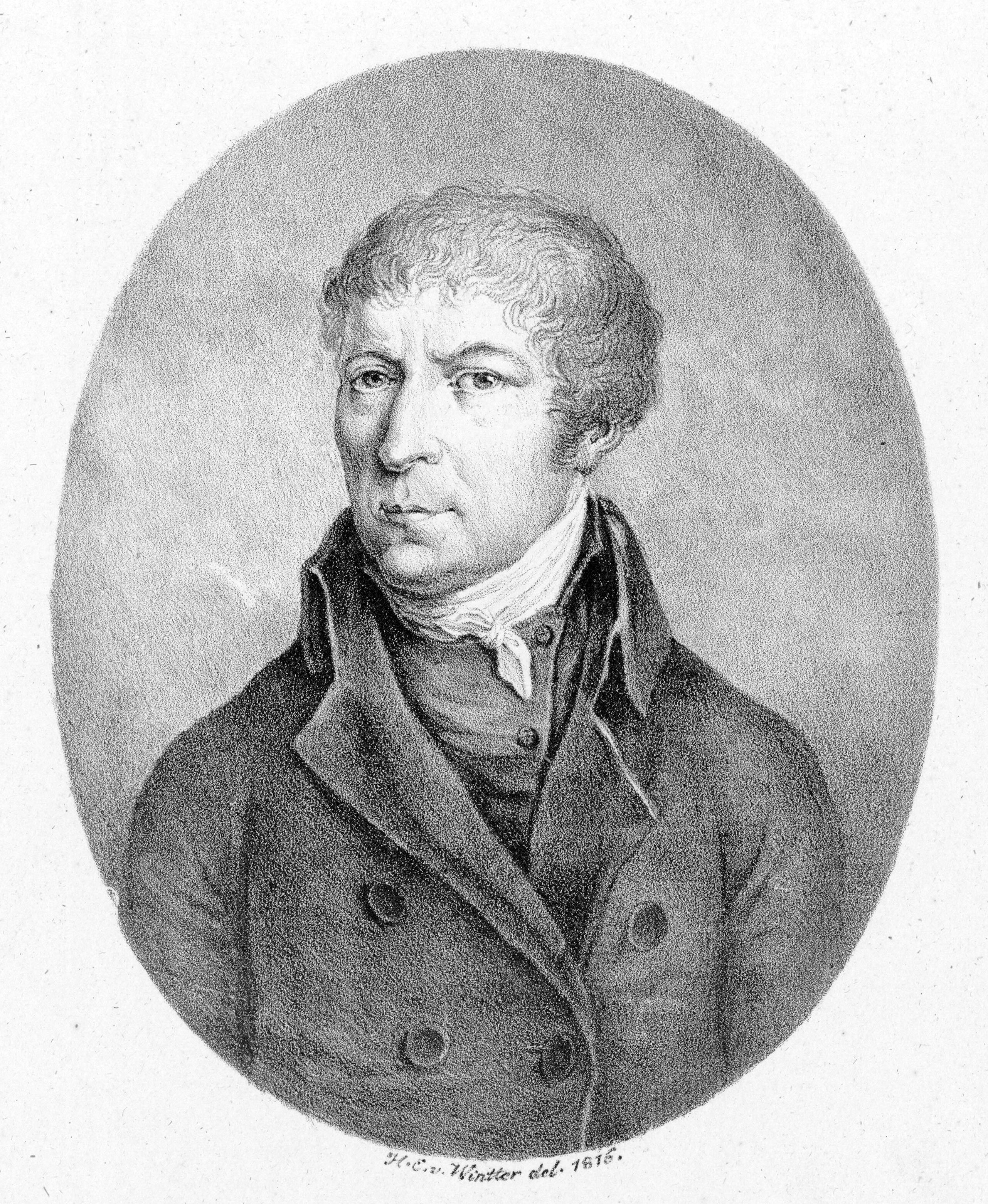
Johann Franz Xaver Sterkel.

Johann Franz Xaver Sterkel (3 December 1750 in Würzburg – 12 October 1817 in Würzburg) was a German composer and pianist in the 18th and early 19th centuries.

He was educated at the University of Würzburg and in 1778 he became chaplain and musician at the court in Mainz. He lived in Regensburg (from 1802 to 1810), then in Aschaffenburg, and finally retired to Würzburg in 1815.

At first Sterkel was an organist in Neumünster. In 1774 he was ordained a priest. He moved to Mainz and became court chaplain, but toured Italy as a pianist from 1779 to 1782. After a visit to Italy in 1782, where he met Padre Martini, he returned to Mainz, becoming music director to the Electoral orchestra in 1793.

From 1793 to 1797 he was court Kapellmeister at Mainz. When the capella was disbanded, he went to Würzburg, Regensburg and later Aschaffenburg, where he served the Grand Duke of Frankfurt.

From 1810 to 1814, as a prolific and successful composer he wrote mostly instrumental music, including symphonies and concertos, chamber works with keyboard solo, piano sonatas and piano duets.

Many of the sonatas have a lyricism and loose-knit structure pointing towards Franz Schubert. Among his vocal works are the Italian opera Farnace (Naples, 1782), Italian arias, songs and ensembles and German lieder. His works as well as his distinctive playing style (which impressed Beethoven in 1791) contributed to the development of a pianistic idiom.

== Works ==
- opera Farnace (Naples, 1782);
- 24 symphonies, two overtures for orchestra;
- six piano concertos;
- string quintet, piano quartet, six string trios, six duos for violin and viola;
- sonatas for piano solo and duet, piano pieces, variations;
- German songs, Italian canzonets; vocal duets.

== Bibliography ==
- A. Scharnagl, Johann Franz Xaver Sterkel, Würzburg, 1943.
- Joann Élart, " Circulation des quatre symphonies oeuvre VII de Johann Franz Xaver Sterkel de l'Allemagne à Rouen : un itinéraire singulier du goût musical entre 1770 et 1825 ", Studien zu den deutsch-französischen Musikbeziehungen im 18. und 19. Jahrhundert, bericht über die erste gemeinsame Jahrestagung der Gesellschaft für Musikforschung und der Société française de musicologie Saarbrücken 1999 (Hildesheim : Georg Olms Verlag, 2002), pp. 266–281.
- Joachim Fischer, Johann Franz Xaver Sterkel 1750-1817, Thematisch-bibliographisches Werkverzeichnis Sterkel-Gesellschaft e.V., 2014. www.sterkel-gesellschaft.org
