= Royal chapel (disambiguation) =

Royal chapel or Chapel Royal may refer to:

- Capela Real, Portugal
- Capilla flamenca, Spanish royal court
- Chapel Royal, royal chapels in the British Commonwealth:
  - Chapel Royal, Brighton, former Chapel Royal, United Kingdom
  - Chapel Royal (Dublin Castle), former Chapel Royal, United Kingdom
  - Chapel Royal (Hampton Court Palace), United Kingdom
  - Chapel Royal (St. James's Palace), United Kingdom
  - Christ Church Royal Chapel, Deseronto, Canada
  - Church of St Peter ad Vincula, London, United Kingdom
  - Mohawk Chapel, Her Majesty's Royal Chapel of the Mohawks, Brantford, Canada
  - Queen's Chapel, St. James's Palace, United Kingdom
  - Royal Chapel of St Katherine-upon-the-Hoe, Plymouth, United Kingdom
  - Savoy Chapel, London, United Kingdom
  - St John's Chapel, London, United Kingdom
- Chapel Royal of Naples, Italy
- Chapelle royale, France
- La Capella Reial de Catalunya, Catalan music ensemble
- Royal Chapel of Granada, Spain Capilla Real
- Royal Chapel (Sweden) Slottskyrkan

== See also ==
- Capilla Real (disambiguation)
- Court chapel (disambiguation)
