= Johannes Pauli =

German Franciscan writer

Johannes Pauli (about 1455 – after 1530 at Thann in Alsace) was a German Franciscan writer.

== Life ==
What little is known of his life rests upon unreliable information. Ludwig von Pastor rejected the story that he was of Jewish descent, and had been baptised at an early age, taking the name of Johannes Pauli from his godfather.

Pauli became Master of Arts in Strasbourg, entered the Franciscans (the "Barefooted"), and delivered his first sermon in Thann in 1479. Two years later, he was sent to the convent at Oppenheim; in 1504 the conventual monastery at Bern desired him as a guardian. He held the same office in Strasbourg 1506-10; in 1516 he is mentioned as preacher in Sélestat; later in Villingen in the Black Forest, and finally in Thann.

== Works ==
Prompted by his acquaintance with Geiler of Kaisersberg, he published in 1515 "Das Evangelienbuch"; in 1516 "Die Emeis, Buch von der Omeissen"; in 1517 "Die Brösamlin Geilers"; in 1520 "Das Narrenschiff, aus dem Latein ins Deutsch gebracht".

His own work, which assured him a lasting place in German literature, is the collection of farces and humorous stories "Schimpf (Scherz) und Ernst". This a genuine "folk book", written in an easy and plain style, filled with humour and pointed satire, intended to instruct while it amused. "He did not desire," as Georg Rollenhagen says in his preface to "Froschmäusler", "to make people laugh without teaching them something; his book was like the old legends and sagas, full of fabulous happenings and incidents, but written so that in them, as in a comedy, there are combined with poetry and imagination the plain, unvarnished, bitter truths of life, worded so as to tell serious things in a jocular manner, with a laugh and a smile."

Pauli drew his information from a variety of sources, and his farces became the inspiration of the later German poets, especially for Hans Sachs. He exercised a wide influence upon the culture of the whole century.
