= Oppenheim =

- Town
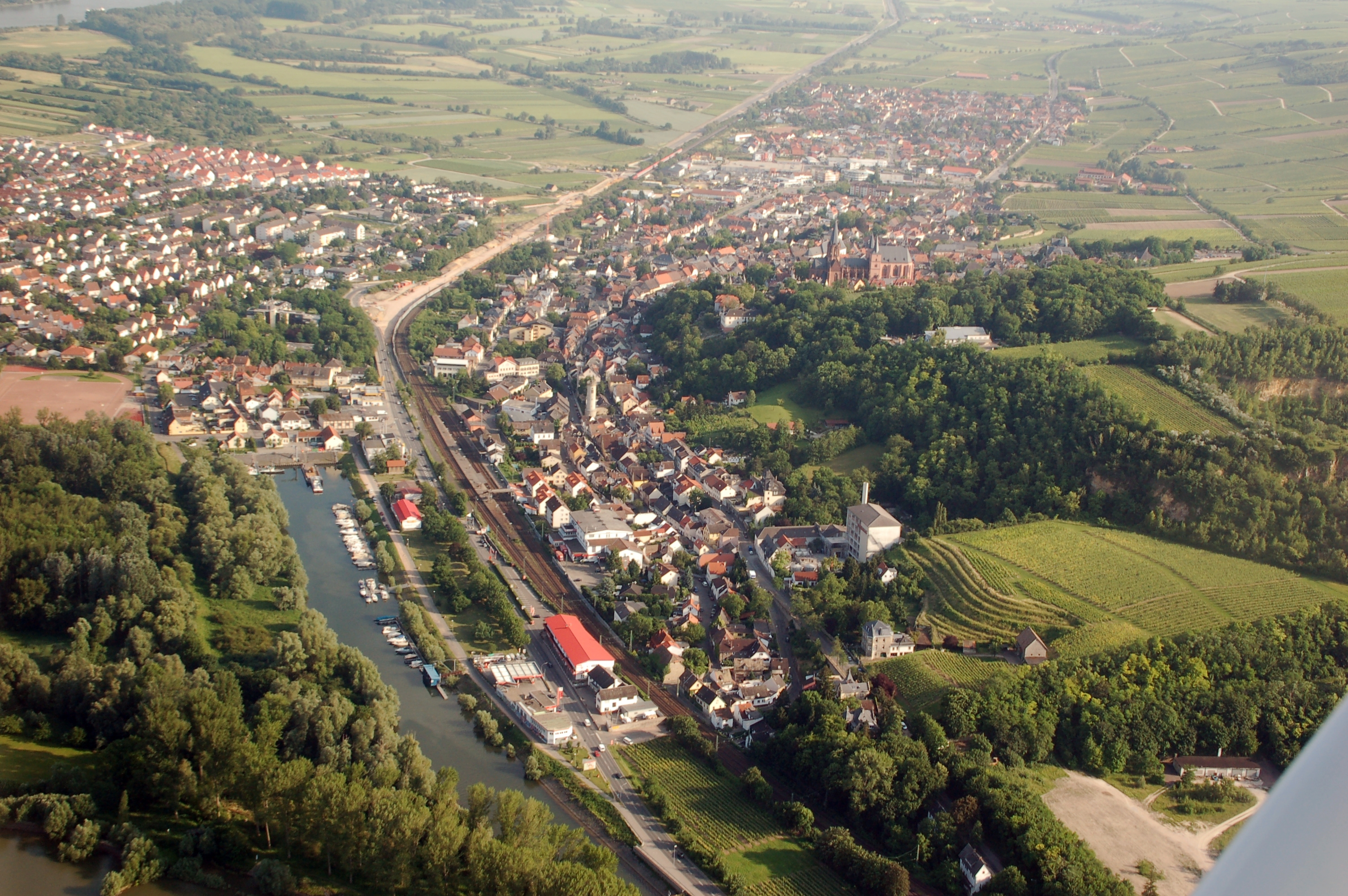
- Aerial view 2007

- Coat of arms

- Location of Oppenheim within Mainz-Bingen district
- Interactive map of Oppenheim
- Location within Germany Location within Rhineland-Palatinate
- Coordinates: 49°51′20″N 08°21′37″E
- Country: Germany
- State: Rhineland-Palatinate
- District: Mainz-Bingen
- Municipal assoc.: Rhein-Selz

Government
  - Mayor (2019–24): Walter Jertz

Area
  - Total: 7.1 km^{2} (2.7 sq mi)
- Elevation: 100 m (330 ft)

Population (2025-12-31)
  - Total: 7,153
  - Density: 1,000/km^{2} (2,600/sq mi)
- Time zone: UTC+01:00 (CET)
  - Summer (DST): UTC+02:00 (CEST)
- Postal codes: 55276
- Dialling codes: 06133
- Vehicle registration: MZ
- Website: www.stadt-oppenheim.de

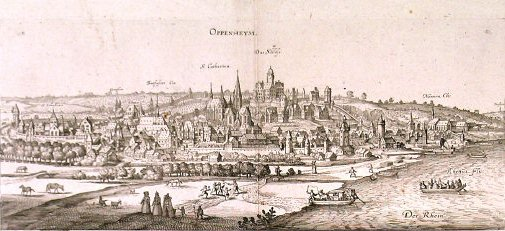
By Joannes Janssonius, c. 1682

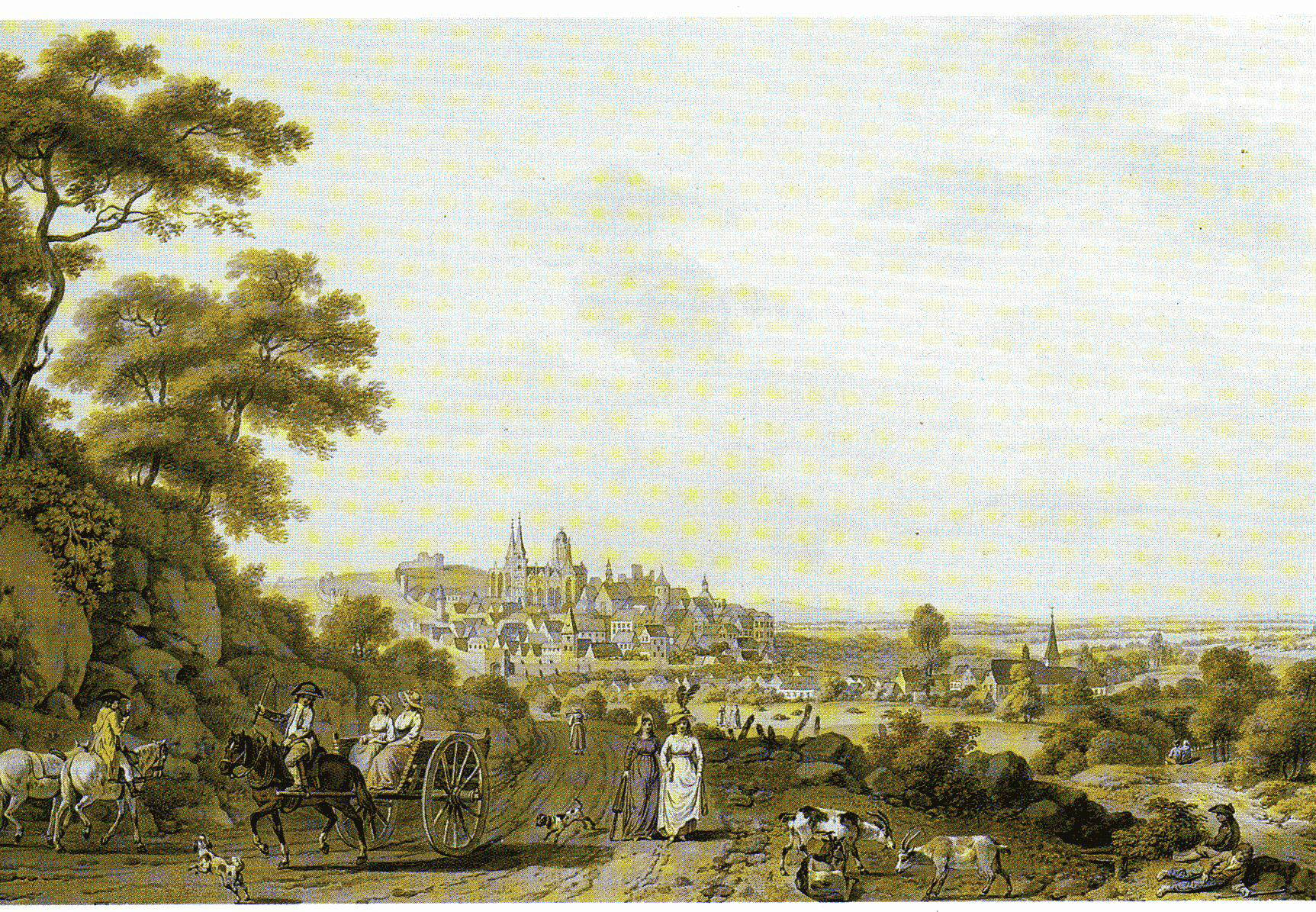
Oppenheim about 1800

Oppenheim (German: [ˈɔpn̩haɪm] or [ˈɔpm̩haɪm]) is a town in the Mainz-Bingen district of Rhineland-Palatinate, Germany.

== Geography ==
=== Location ===
The town lies on the Upper Rhine in Rhenish Hesse between Mainz and Worms. It is the seat of the Verbandsgemeinde (special administrative district).

== History ==
In 765, the first documented mention of the Frankish village was recorded in the Lorsch Codex, in connection with an endowment by Charlemagne to the Lorsch Abbey. Further portions of Oppenheim were added to the endowment in 774. In 1008, Oppenheim was granted market rights. In October 1076 Oppenheim gained special importance in the Investiture Controversy. At the princely session of Trebur and Oppenheim, the princes called on King Henry IV to undertake the "Walk to Canossa". After Oppenheim was returned to the Empire in 1147, it became a Free Imperial City in 1225, during the Staufer Emperor Frederick II's reign. At this time, the town was important for its imperial castle and the Burgmannen who lived there.

In the 14th century, the town was pledged to the Electorate of Mainz and beginning in 1398, it belonged to the territory of the Electoral Palatinate.

In 1621, the Oppenheim town chronicle reports a great fire in which the Oppenheim Town Hall was almost completely destroyed. The Electoral Oberamt archive, too, was lost in the fire, and so it was moved to Mainz.

On 14 September 1620, Spanish troops overran the town in the Thirty Years' War. The Spaniards occupied Oppenheim until 1632. In 1688, French troops overran the town in the Nine Years' War (1688–1697). On 31 May 1689, Landskrone Castle and the town were utterly destroyed by the French under General Mélac. Until 1797, Oppenheim remained an Electoral Palatinate holding. After being in French hands, Oppenheim passed, in 1816, to the Grand Duchy of Hesse-Darmstadt. It remained Hessian until 1945.

In March 1945, troops of the 3rd Army under General George S. Patton managed to build a crossing over the Rhine near Oppenheim and to occupy it.

== Twin cities ==
- Givry, Saône-et-Loire, France
- Adnet, Salzburg, Austria
- (Germany) Werder, Potsdam-Mittelmark, Brandenburg
- Calp, Alicante, Spain
- Sant'Ambrogio di Valpolicella, Province of Verona, Veneto, Italy

== Coat of arms ==
The town's arms might be described thus: Or an eagle displayed sable.

All town seals up until 1925 showed a crowned king's head, but for one, from 1266, that showed the Emperor on his throne. Nevertheless, the town adopted arms with this composition while still using the king's head seal. The arms have not changed since their adoption.

The arms have been borne since 1609.

== Culture ==
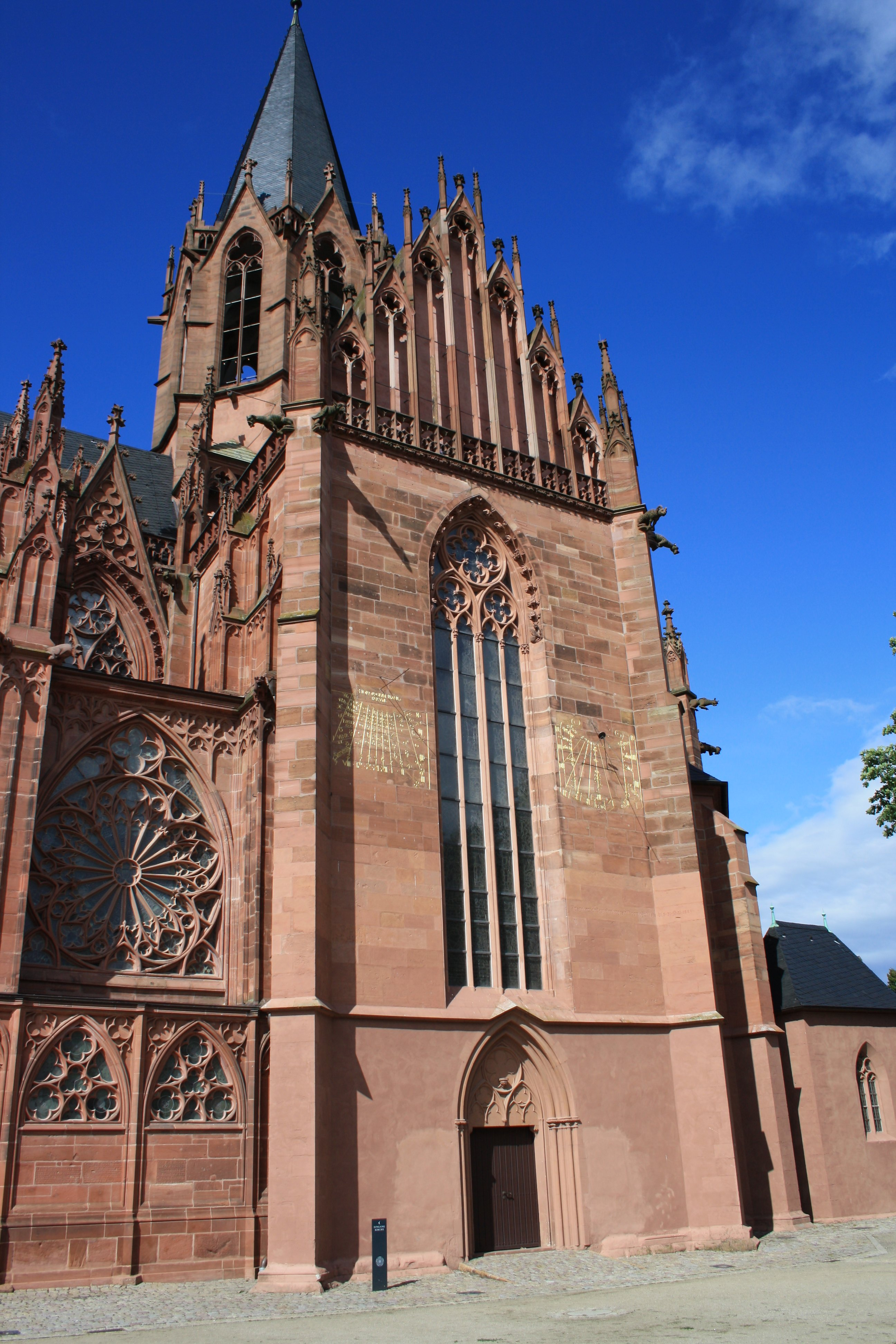
Katharinenkirche

- Katharinenkirche is a Gothic church.

== Economy and infrastructure ==
=== Public institutions ===
The administration of the Verbandsgemeinde of Nierstein-Oppenheim is based in Oppenheim.

== Notable people ==
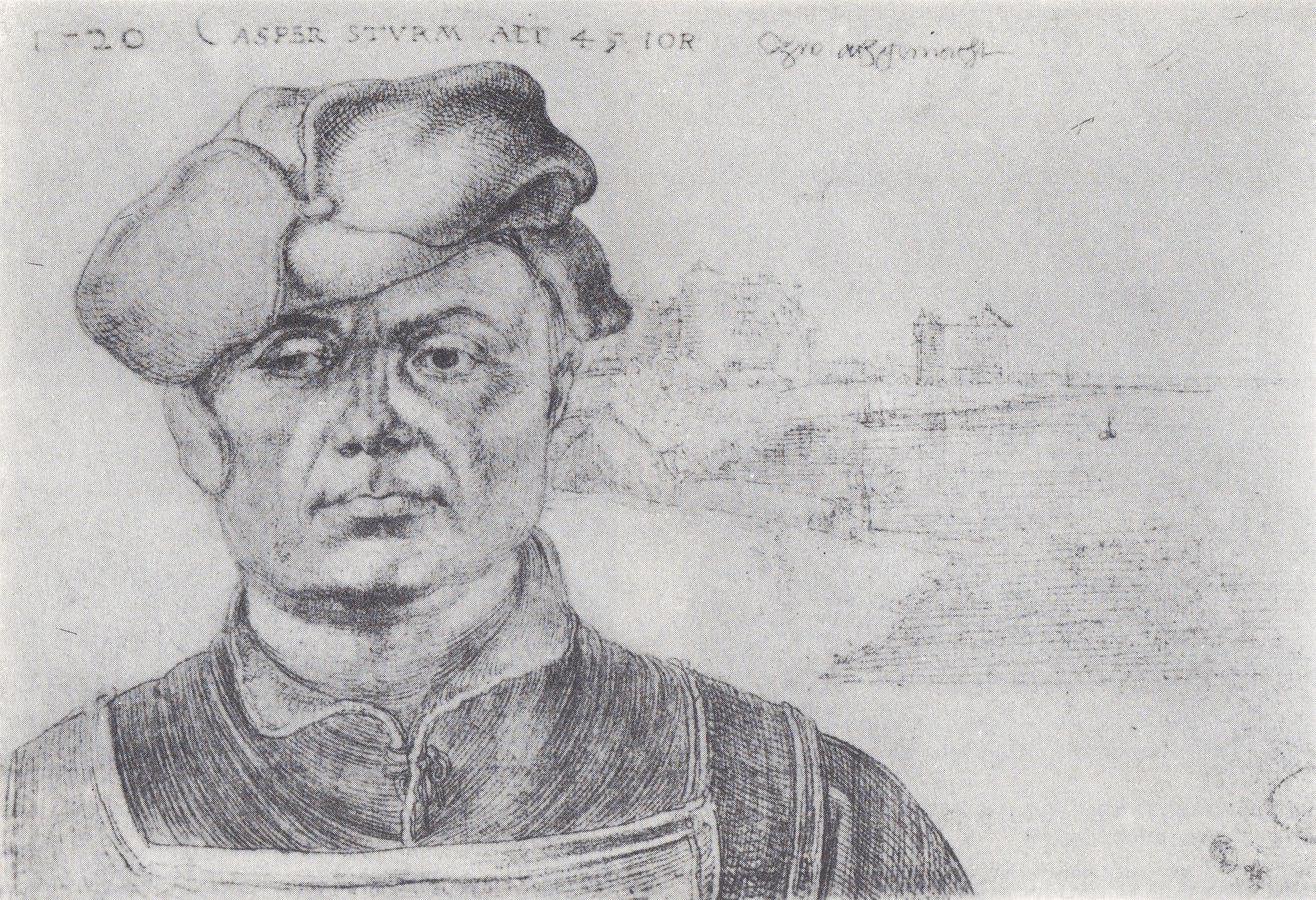
Kaspar Sturm guided Martin Luther to the Diet of Worms

- Johann von Dalberg (1455–1503), bishop and politician.
- Kaspar Sturm (1481–1523), herald who guided Martin Luther to the Diet of Worms and back.
- Christoph Abeck (died after 1607), bass and court singer who flourished in the late 16th and early 17th centuries
- Paul Wallot (1841–1912), German architect, designer of the Reichstag building in Berlin.
- Johanna Senfter (1879–1961), 20th century composer

=== People who have worked there ===
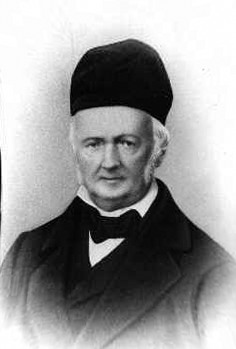
Friedrich Koch, (1786–1865), apothecary, inventor of industrial quinine manufacture.

- Madern Gerthener (b. about 1360; d. 1430), City master builder, sculptor
- Johannes Pauli (b. 1450/54; d. after 1530), friar, writer.
- Jakob Köbel (1460–1535), publisher and quiet.
- Anton Praetorius (1560–1613), clergyman, fighter against witch trials and torture.
- Johann Theodor de Bry (1561–1623), publisher, Matthäus Merian's father-in-law.
- Matthäus Merian (1593–1650), copper engraver.
