= Die Geisterinsel (Zumsteeg) =

Die Geisterinsel is a Singspiel in 3 acts by Johann Rudolf Zumsteeg for Stuttgart, but premiered in 1805 in Dresden. A recording featuring Christiane Karg, Falko Hönisch, Benjamin Hulett, Sophie Harmsen, Patrick Pobeschin, Christian Immler, Kammerchor Stuttgart, Hofkapelle Stuttgart, Frieder Bernius was issued on Carus in 2011.
