= Paul Klengel =

German musician

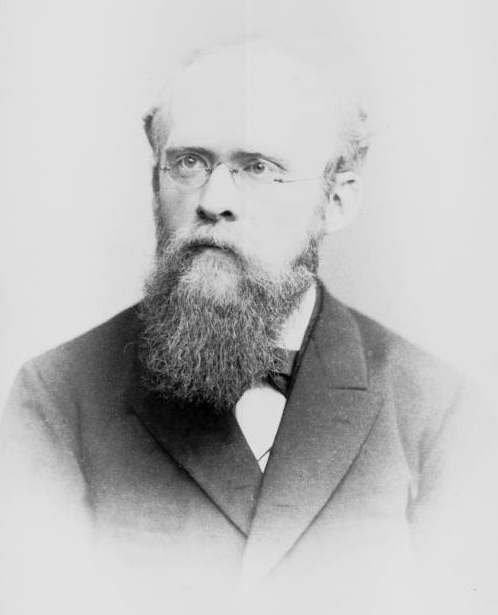
Paul Klengel, 1885

Paul Klengel (13 May 1854 – 24 April 1935) was a German violinist, violist, pianist, conductor, composer, editor and arranger. He was the brother of cellist Julius Klengel.

== Biography ==
Klengel was born and died in Leipzig, where he studied at the Leipzig Conservatory of Music and the University of Leipzig receiving his doctorate in 1886 with the dissertation Zur Ästhetik der Tonkunst (The Aesthetic of Music). From 1881 to 1886 he was choral conductor for the Euterpe Music Society in Leipzig and from 1888 to 1891 he worked at the Hofkapelle Stuttgart. He conducted for the German choral societies in New York City from 1898 to 1902. Klengel then returned to Leipzig to conduct the Arion Society and later joined the Leipzig Conservatory as professor of violin and piano.

Klengel was a versatile musician; he was an accomplished violinist and pianist who sought a career as a concert musician and soloist. He composed works for violin, viola, and piano, as well as many songs and choral works. Klengel was a "house arranger" for Simrock publishing house. He is noted for his artistic arrangements for violin and viola, many of which are still used for teaching.

== Original compositions ==
Chamber music

- Fünf Stücke (5 Pieces) for 2 violins, Op. 9 (published 1888)

1. Romanze
2. Humoreske
3. Menuett
4. Ständchen
5. Scherzo

- Fünf Characterstücke (5 Character Pieces) for violin and piano, Op. 11 (1894); Nos 3 and 5 also for cello and piano

1. Sérénade mélancolique
2. Tempo di minuetto
3. Élégie in E minor
4. Caprice in E major
5. Nocturne in F major

- Pastorale for violin and organ (or piano), Op. 17 (1901)
- Zwei Stücke (2 Pieces) for violin and piano, Op. 19 (1901)

2. An der Wiege

- Sechs Vortragsstücke for 2 violins, Op. 31 (published 1903)
- Fünf lyrische Tonstücke (5 Lyric Tone Pieces) for violin and piano, Op. 34 (1904)
- Suite No. 1 in D minor for violin and piano, Op. 38 (1909)

1. Präludium
2. Courante
3. Menuetto
4. Bourrée
5. Air
6. Tambourin

- Sechs Stücke (6 Pieces) for viola and piano, Op.39 (1910)

1. Klage (Lament; Plainte)
2. Und meine Seele spannte weit ihre Flügel aus (And My Soul Spread Out Its Wings; Et mon âme ouvrait ses ailes)
3. Erhebung und Trost (Elevation and Consolation; Éspoir et consolation)
4. Eine Erinnerung (A Recollection; Un souvenir)
5. Valse Impromptu
6. Schlummerlied (Lullaby; Berceuse)

- Sechs lyrische Stücke (6 Lyric Pieces) for violin and piano, Op. 42 (1910)
- Zwei Charakterstücke (2 Character Pieces) for violin and piano, Op. 44 (1909)
- Serenade in D minor for violin and viola, Op.45 (1911)
- Drei Romanzen (3 Romances) for viola and piano, Op.46 (1912)
- Vier Phantasiestücke (4 Fantasy Pieces) for viola and piano, Op.48 (1912)

1. Spielmannsweise
2. Capriccio
3. Gruss in die Ferne
4. Reigen

- Schumanniana for violin, viola and piano (1919); based on themes of Robert Schumann
- Vierzehn Präludien (14 Preludes) for violin solo, Op. 62 (1932)

Cadenzas

- Kadenzen zum Viotti-Konzert Nr. 23, G Dur (Cadenzas to Violin Concerto No. 23 in G major by Giovanni Battista Viotti) (published 1930)
- Cadenza to Viola concerto D major op. 1 by Carl Stamitz

Piano

- Sechs Phantasiestücke (6 Fantasy Pieces), Op. 5 (1879)
- Drei Mazurkas (3 Mazurkas), Op. 7 (1879)
- Zwei Romanzen (2 Romances), Op. 8 (published 1891)

1. in A♭ major
2. in F♯ major

- Sechs Clavierstücke (6 Piano Pieces), Op. 10 (1886 or 1887); revised version published in 1899 as Sechs kleine Vortragsstücke (6 Little Concert Pieces)

1. Frühlingsgruß
2. Blatt im Winde
3. Abendstimmung
4. Mazurka (A♭ major)
5. Albumblatt
6. Alla Tarantella

- Acht Fantasiestücke (8 Fantasy Pieces), Op. 12 (1893)
- Fünf Stücke (5 Pieces), Op. 23 (1901)
- Vier Stücke (4 Pieces), Op. 37 (1907)

1. Abendstimmung (At Eventide)
2. Humoreske
3. Ein Lied vom Scheiden (At Parting)
4. Barcarole

- Sechs Fantasiestücke (6 Fantasy Pieces), Op. 47 (1914)
- Fünf Fantasiestücke (5 Fantasy Pieces), Op. 49 (1917)
- Fünf Klavierstücke (5 Piano Pieces), Op. 54 (1922)
- Elegie – "Eigentum von Lisbeth Holzheu" (owned by Lisbeth Holzheu)
- Sehr ruhig – "Eigentum von Lisbeth Holzheu" (owned by Lisbeth Holzheu)

Vocal

- Sechs zweistimmige Lieder (6 Two-Voice Songs) for 2 voices and piano, Op. 3 (1885)

1. Ich weiss ja nicht, was kommen wird; words by A. Aar
2. Dein Bild; words by Hoffmann von Fallersleben
3. Ergebung; words by Paul Heyse
4. Brautlied; words by Paul Heyse
5. Du bist so weit; words by A. Aar
6. Treueste Liebe; words by Paul Heyse

- Trauungslied (Wedding Song) for voice and piano, Op. 6 (published 1900); words by Karl Johann Philipp Spitta
- Drei Lieder (5 Songs) for alto and piano, Op. 13 (1894)

1. Abendlied: Ruhe umhüllt; words by Franz Grillparzer
2. Deinem Blick mich zu bequemen; words by Johann Wolfgang von Goethe
3. Wenn deine Arme halten; words by Karl Vohsen

- Fünf Lieder (5 Songs) for mezzo-soprano or alto and piano, Op. 14 (1894)

1. Lass die wilden Wogen toben; words by Hoffmann von Fallersleben
2. Georgia's Hügel ruh'n; words by Friedrich von Bodenstedt
3. An dich verschwendet; words by Paul Heyse
4. Du mit den schwarzen Augen; words by Emanuel Geibel

- Vier Lieder (4 Songs) for voice and piano, Op. 15 (1900)

1. Über die Haide geht sausend des Herbstes Wind
2. Serenade: Die Sterne blinken in Silberpracht
3. Leid: Drunten im Grunde, ihr Blümelein blau
4. Des Abends: Die Abendglocken läuten

- Drei duette (3 Duets) for mezzo-soprano, baritone and piano (1903); words by Julius Gersdorff; English words by Alice Mattulath

1. Denkst Du der Stunden (Dost Thou Remember)
2. Ihr Sterne und ihr Blumen (I See the Stars above Me)
3. Wenn die Rosen blühn (Love, When the Roses Bloom)

- Fünf elegische Gesänge (5 Elegiac Songs) for mezzo-soprano or alto and piano, Op. 53 (1918); words by Alexandra Rafaele

1. Sonnenwende
2. In der Stille
3. Nun gehn die Stürme schlafen
4. Die Felder rauschen
5. Bitte

- Vier Lieder (4 Songs) for medium voice with violin and piano, Op. 59 (1924)

1. Vor Tagesgrauen
2. Im Mittagsschweigen
3. Wilde Rose und erste Liebe
4. Tanzlied im Mai

Choral

- Die deutsche Mutter for alto, female chorus and piano, Op. 50 (1918); words by Isolde Kurz
- Lagarde (11. August 1914) for male chorus a cappella, Op. 51 (1918); words by Albert Korn

== Sources ==
- Forbes, Watson, "Klengel, Paul", The New Grove Dictionary of Music and Musicians, Volume 10, page 108 (London: Macmillan, 1980), 20 vols. ISBN 0-333-23111-2
