= Das Pfauenfest =

- Singspiel by Johann Rudolf Zumsteeg
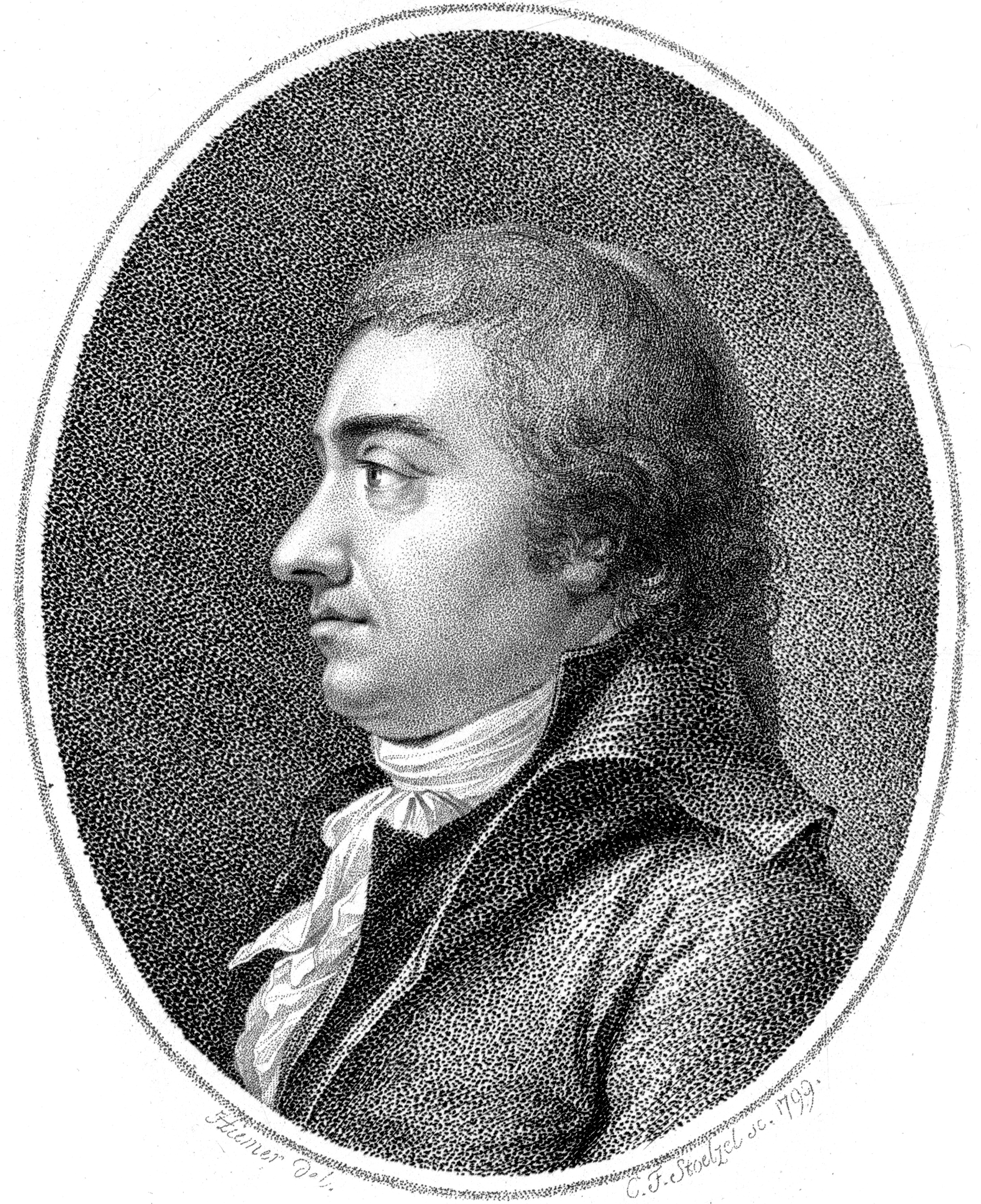
- The composer in 1799
- Librettist: F. A. C. Werthes
- Language: German
- Premiere: 24 February 1801 court theatre, Stuttgart

Das Pfauenfest is a singspiel in two acts by composer Johann Rudolf Zumsteeg. The opera has a German libretto by F. A. C. Werthes and premiered at the court theatre in Stuttgart on 24 February 1801.

== Synopsis ==
The fairy Morgana wickedly conspires against Lenore; spreading malicious lies about her. As a result, Lenore loses the love of Karados, a knight, and is banished from King Arthur's court. The King encourages a romantic attachment between Karados and his niece. The two are scheduled to be betrothed at the Feast of the Peacock, and King Arthur orders that Lenore be brought back to court to witness the event. Meanwhile, Lenore is ministered to by a guardian spirit who weaves her a beautiful new gown. Lenore arrives at the court along with the guardian spirit who is in the guise of a minstrel. The guardian spirit has brought the gown he weaved to the court proclaiming to the men that it will only fit a man of great virtue and the women that it will only fit the most beautiful woman. He has also brought a drinking-horn which only a true knight can empty. To the chagrin of the knights, Queen Ginevra proclaims that she will try on the gown first. When she approaches the gown, it flies away from her. All the other ladies of the court attempt to try on the gown with the same result. When Lenore reaches for the gown it stays still and fits her perfectly. Similarly, none of the knights can empty the drinking-horn except for Karados. Seeing that Karados and Lenore have been honored in this way, the King accepts Lenore back into the court and they are betrothed.

== Sources ==
- Casaglia, Gherardo (2005)."Das Pfauenfest". L'Almanacco di Gherardo Casaglia (in Italian).
- Thomas Bauman. The New Grove Dictionary of Opera, edited by Stanley Sadie (1992), ISBN 0-333-73432-7 and ISBN 1-56159-228-5
