= Christoph Abeck =

Christoph Abeck, sometimes given as Christoph van Beck or Christoph von Beck, was a German bass who flourished during the late 16th and early 17th centuries.

== Biography ==
Christoph Abeck was the son of Hans von Beck and was born in Oppenheim. He began his career as a court musician of the Heidelberger Hofkapelle (English: Heidelberg Court Chapel) where he served until 1584 when he was appointed to a post as a musician at the Hofkapelle Stuttgart. While serving there he married Anna Maria Zerrer, the daughter of hofmeister Cyriakus Zerrer, on January 7, 1589. He continued to serve at the Stuttgart court until 1596. He had been dismissed from this post and made an unsuccessful appeal to be reinstated in November 1596 but did receive a severance payment of 4 florins.

Abeck most likely was in Darmstadt in Hessian service immediately following his dismissal from the Stuttgart court. From 1599 until as late as 1607 he was a court musician in Darmstadt. Nothing is known of the singer after August 1607.
