= Frieder Bernius =

German conductor

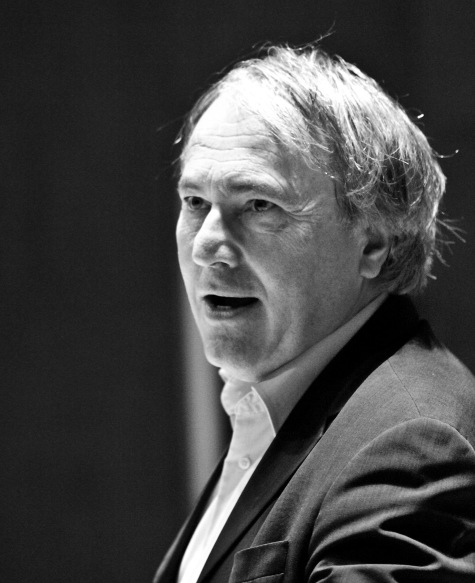
- Frieder Bernius in 2014
- Born: 22 June 1947 (age 79); Ludwigshafen
- Education: Musikhochschule Stuttgart; University of Tübingen
- Occupations: Choral conductor; Conductor
- Organizations: Kammerchor Stuttgart; Internationale Festtage Alter Musik; Hofkapelle Stuttgart
- Awards: Edison Award; Diapason d'Or; Order of Merit of the Federal Republic of Germany

Frieder Bernius (born 22 June 1947) is a German conductor, the founder and director of the chamber choir Kammerchor Stuttgart, founded in 1968. They became leaders for historically informed performances. He founded the Stuttgart festival of Baroque music, Internationale Festtage Alter Musik, in 1987, and is a recipient of the Edison Award (1990), Diapason d'Or (1990) and the Order of Merit of the Federal Republic of Germany (1993).

== Career ==
Frieder Bernius was born in Ludwigshafen-Oppau, the second child of the Protestant minister Helmut Bernius and his wife Inge, a church musician. After his Abitur at the Karl-Friedrich-Gymnasium in Mannheim he studied music and musicology at the Musikhochschule Stuttgart and at the University of Tübingen. In 1968, his first year at the Musikhochschule, he founded the Kammerchor Stuttgart (Stuttgart chamber choir). They first concentrated on a cappella music of the 19th and 20th century, but expanded their repertoire.

Since 1977, Bernius has collaborated with leading German orchestras and conducted the choirs of broadcasters, such as the SDR and WDR, the NDR Chor and the RIAS Kammerchor.

In 1985 the choir decisively turned to early music, and Bernius became known as a conductor of historically informed performance. He has continued in Bach's music the several-voice-to-a-part approach, as opposed to the one-voice-per-part approach advocated by Andrew Parrott and Joshua Rifkin. The Historical Dictionary of Choral Music says that it the choir is "recognized for high musical standards and stylistic flexibility, winning many international awards." Classical cites Bernius as leading "lively and intelligent performances." He has collaborated with the Musica Fiata of Cologne, the La Grande Écurie et la Chambre du Roy of Paris and the Tafelmusik of Toronto.

In 1985/1987, he was instrumental in founding the Barockorchester Stuttgart and the Stuttgart festival of Baroque music, Internationale Festtage Alter Musik (now "Stuttgart Barock"). In 1988, Bernius, the Kammerchor Stuttgart and the Barockorchester Stuttgart performed the first concert of the first season of the Rheingau Musik Festival at Eberbach Abbey. On 23 June they performed two works by C. P. E. Bach, his Magnificat and the oratorio Die Israeliten in der Wüste, with soloists Nancy Argenta, Lena Lootens, Mechthild Georg, Howard Crook and Stephen Roberts. Bernius and the choir toured the Far East in 1988 and the USA in 1989.

Bernius began recording with Sony Classical in 1989. In 1992 he recorded Gluck's opera Orfeo ed Euridice with Nancy Argenta and Michael Chance. In May 1990 he was awarded the Dutch Edison Award for his recording of Symphoniae Sacrae III by Heinrich Schütz with the Musica Fiata, and in November 1990 he was awarded the French Diapason d'Or for his recording of Missa Dei Filii by Jan Dismas Zelenka with the Tafelmusik.

In 1991 he founded the orchestra Klassische Philharmonie Stuttgart. In 2002, he became musical director of the ensemble Hofkapelle Stuttgart. On 10 July 2005, he conducted at the Rheingau Musik Festival Penderecki's Polish Requiem with the Kammerchor Stuttgart and the Sinfonia Varsovia at Eberbach Abbey. In 2006 he released a CD of Symphonies No. 5 and No. 6 by Johann Wenzel Kalliwoda on the Orfeo label, and also recorded Handel's Messiah (2009), Cherubini's Requiem (2010), and Johann Rudolph Zumsteeg's opera Die Geisterinsel (2011).

In 2009 he was honoured with the Bach Medal of the City of Leipzig. Bernius has been teaching numerous workshops.

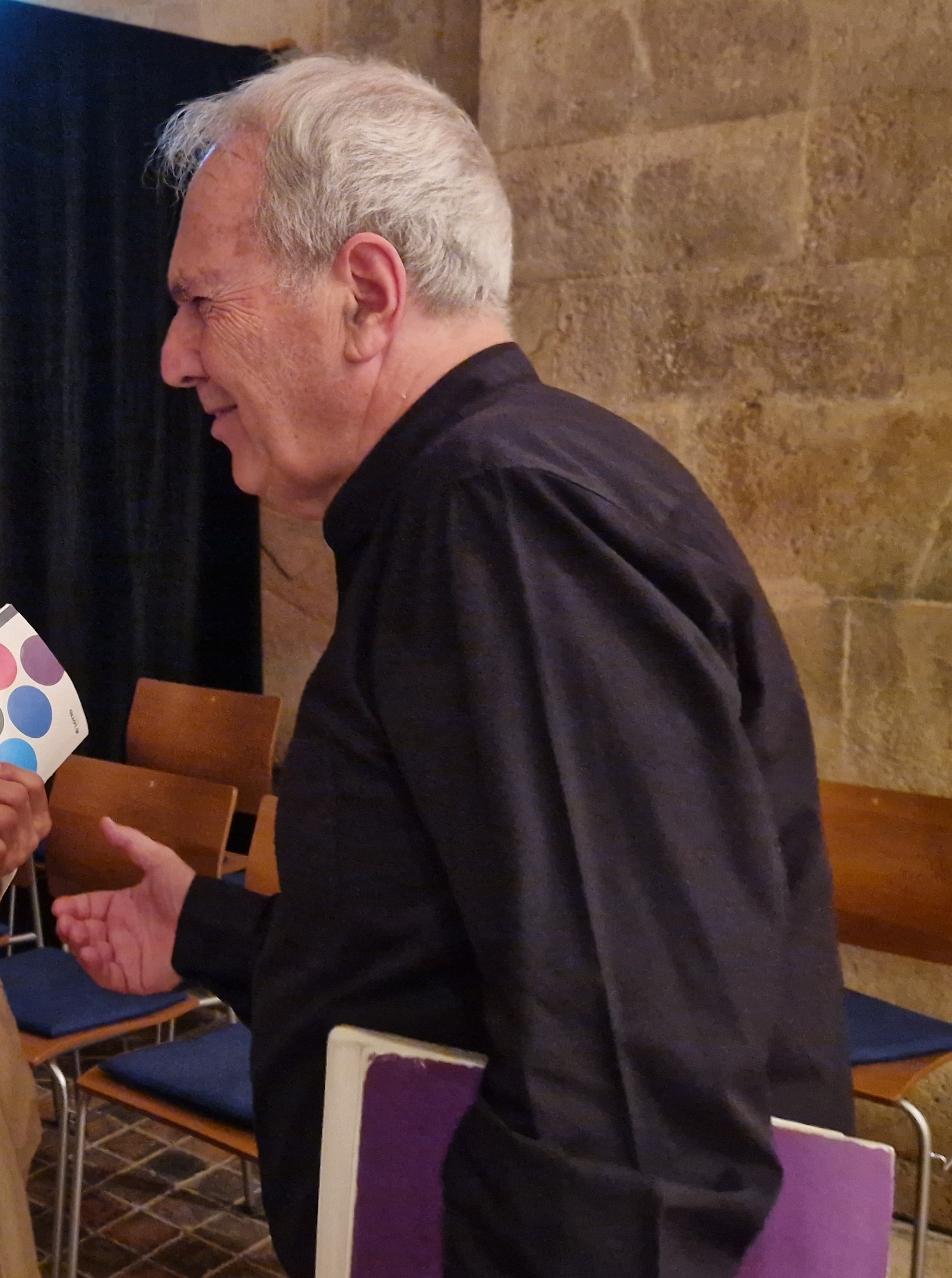
Bernius after a performance, 2026

In 2012, he and the Kammerchor Stuttgart were among the "Wegbegleiter" ("Companions along the way") of the Rheingau Musik Festival in its 25th anniversary season, artists who had appeared regularly from the beginning. They performed at Eberbach Abbey Schubert's "Gesang der Geister über den Wassern", and Ein deutsches Requiem by Brahms, with the Klassische Philarmonie Stuttgart.

== Discography ==
Opera

- Hasse: Attilio Regolo, L'Olimpiade
- Jommelli: Il Vologeso, Orfeo
- Johann Rudolph Zumsteeg: Die Geisterinsel after "The Tempest" of William Shakespeare. Carus

Sacred music

- Works of Heinrich Schütz (5CD), Sony Vivarte
- Mendelssohn: church music (10CD)
- Cherubini: Requiem in C minor, Carus
- Zelenka: Missa Votiva, Kammerchor Stuttgart, Barockorchester Stuttgart, Carus 2010
- Hohes Lied, works by Jean-Yves Daniel-Lesur, Debussy, C. F. C. Fasch, Ravel and Schumann. Kammerchor Stuttgart
- Handel: Messiah HWV 56

Orchestral

- Norbert Burgmüller: Sinfonien Nr. 1 & 2, Hofkapelle Stuttgart

== Awards ==
- 1990: Edison Award
- 1990: Diapason d’Or
- 1993: Bundesverdienstkreuz am Bande
- 2001: Robert-Edler-Preis
- 2002: Verdienstmedaille des Landes Baden-Württemberg
- 2004: Preis der Europäischen Kirchenmusik
- 2009: Bach-Medaille der Stadt Leipzig (Bach medal of the City of Leipzig)
- Preis der deutschen Schallplattenkritik
  - Bestenliste 2001/1 – Chorwerke. For Jan Dismas Zelenka: Missa Dei Patris
  - Bestenliste 2001/3 – Chorwerke. For Lux aeterna.... (Works by Domenico Scarlatti, Gustav Mahler, György Ligeti and Anne Boyd)
  - Bestenliste 2005/1 – Chorwerke. For Gottfried August Homilius: Sehet, welch eine Liebe. (Motetten).
  - Bestenliste 2005/4 – Chorwerke. For Johann Sebastian Bach: Oster-Oratorium BWV 249; Carl Philipp Emanuel Bach: Danket dem Herrn; Heilig
  - Bestenliste 2006/3 – Chorwerke. For Felix Mendelssohn Bartholdy: Hebe deine Augen auf. (Kirchenwerke VII).
  - Bestenliste 2010/3 – Alte Musik. For Jan Dismas Zelenka: Missa votiva
