= Sigmund Hemmel =

Sigmund Hemmel (1520–1565) was a German composer, tenor, and Kapellmeister in Stuttgart, Württemberg. He was said to have used a "large polished slate stone for composing." He was director of the Hofkapelle Stuttgart from 1552 to 1554. He is perhaps best known for his Das Ganz Psalter Davids, a "collection of four-voiced settings of chorales with melody in the tenor voice according to the old custom" published posthumously by Osiander in Tübingen in 1569.
