= Hofkapelle Stuttgart =

Hofkapelle Stuttgart, historically the Württemberg Hofkapelle is a German orchestra based in Stuttgart which has existed since the 16th century. It was the band of the House of Württemberg. Since 2002, it is an orchestra founded by Frieder Bernius to play Baroque music in historically informed performance.

In 1617 it consisted of 50 "excellent singers" and was affiliated with the royal chamber music ensemble. In 1699, eleven "Kapellknaben" (chapel boys) performed. From 1736 to 1750, the chapel made singers and Kapellknaben available for opera performances, the chapel choir was transformed to the opera choir, while an orchestra took the name Hofkapelle.

In 1818, Johann Nepomuk Hummel introduced subscription concerts, promoting the development of the orchestra to a modern symphony orchestra.

== History ==
The Hofkapelle (court chapel) of Württemberg was established in 1496 by Duke Eberhard II for the playing of religious music at court. At that time, it was made up by a boys' choir and vocal and musical instrumentalists.

In 1498, Eberhard II was deposed by Maximilian I, Holy Roman Emperor at the request of the Estates of Württemberg, and the Hofkapelle was suspended. He was replaced as Duke with his nephew, Ulrich. Ulrich reestablished the Hofkapelle, but also opened a school for the boys' choir and lavished money on benefices for the Hofkapelle's members. This and other extravagant expenditures and Ulrich's methods of supporting them made him extremely unpopular. He was expelled in 1519 by the military might of the Swabian League, who then sold the Duchy of Württemberg to Charles V, Holy Roman Emperor. The Hofkapelle continued to play at court while the Duchy was controlled by the House of Habsburg.

=== Hofkapelle Stuttgart ===
In 2002, conductor Frieder Bernius founded an orchestra to play Baroque music in historically informed performance and took the historic name.

== Hofkapellmeister ==
Notable musicians and directors of the Hofkapelle Stuttgart were:

- 1552–1554 Sigmund Hemmel (from 1544 tenor, later until his death in 1565 as composer)
- 1572–1589 Ludwig Daser
- 1589–1594 Balduin Hoyoul (from 1561 "Diskantist", from 1565 altus and composer)
- 1594–1606 Leonhard Lechner (from c. 1585 tenor)
- 1621–1637 Basilius Froberger (father of Johann Jakob Froberger)
- 1657–1665 Samuel Capricornus
- 1700v1704 Johann Sigismund Kusser
- 1706–1716 Johann Christoph Pez ("Oberkapellmeister")
- 1717–1737 Giuseppe Antonio Brescianello
- 1738–1744 Johann Daniel Hardt, Oberkapellmeister
- 1744–1755 Giuseppe Antonio Brescianello (again)
- 1750–1753 Ignaz Holzbauer, Oberkapellmeister
- 1753–1768 Niccolò Jommelli (also opera composer for the court)
- 1770–1777 Antonio Boroni
- 1779–1781 Ferdinando Mazzanti
- 1783–1792 Agostino Poli
- ?–1796 Johann Georg Distler (1781–1796 at the Hofkapelle, finally as "Kapelldirektor"
- 1792–1802 Johann Rudolph Zumsteeg (1781–1791 as cellist)
- 1803–1806? Johann Friedrich Kranz
- 1806–1808 Justin Heinrich Knecht
- 1807–1812 Franz Danzi
- 1812–1816 Conradin Kreutzer
- 1816–1818 Johann Nepomuk Hummel
- 1819–1856 Peter Joseph von Lindpaintner
- 1851–1861 Friedrich Wilhelm Kücken
- 1861–1867? Karl Anton Eckert
- 1865–1898 Karl Doppler
- 1867–1888 Johann Joseph Abert (1853–1867 as double bassist)
- 1888–1891? Paul Klengel
- 1891–1895 Hermann Zumpe
- 1895–1900 Aloys Obrist
- 1898–1903 Hugo Reichenberger
- 1900–1907 Karl Pohlig
- c. 1904? Schinte
- 1905–1908? Erich Band
- until 1908 Matthäus Pitteroff
- 1908–1918 Max von Schillings (Generalmusikdirektor)

== Musicians ==
- Christoph Abeck (1584–1596 singer)
- Philipp Friedrich Böddecker (seit 1639)
- Johann Michael Nicolai (1655–1685 violinist)
- Pietro Nardini (1763–1765 concert master)
- Josef Rudolf Lewy (1819–1826 hornist and violist)
- Wenzel Neukirchner (1829–1889 bassoonist)
- Carl Maria von Weber (1806–1807 artistic director)
- Ludwig Abeille (from 1802 concert master, 1815 court organist)
- Joseph Huber (from 1865 violinist and composer)
- Hugo Wehrle, from 1868 for 30 years Musikdirektor, with Edmund Singer
