= Capilla Real =

Capilla Real may refer to:

- One of the Chapels Royal serving the king of Spain
  - Capilla Real de Granada, or its choir
  - Capilla Real de Madrid, or its choir
