= Attilio Regolo (Hasse) =

Opera by Johann Adolph Hasse

- Opera seria by Johann Adolph Hasse
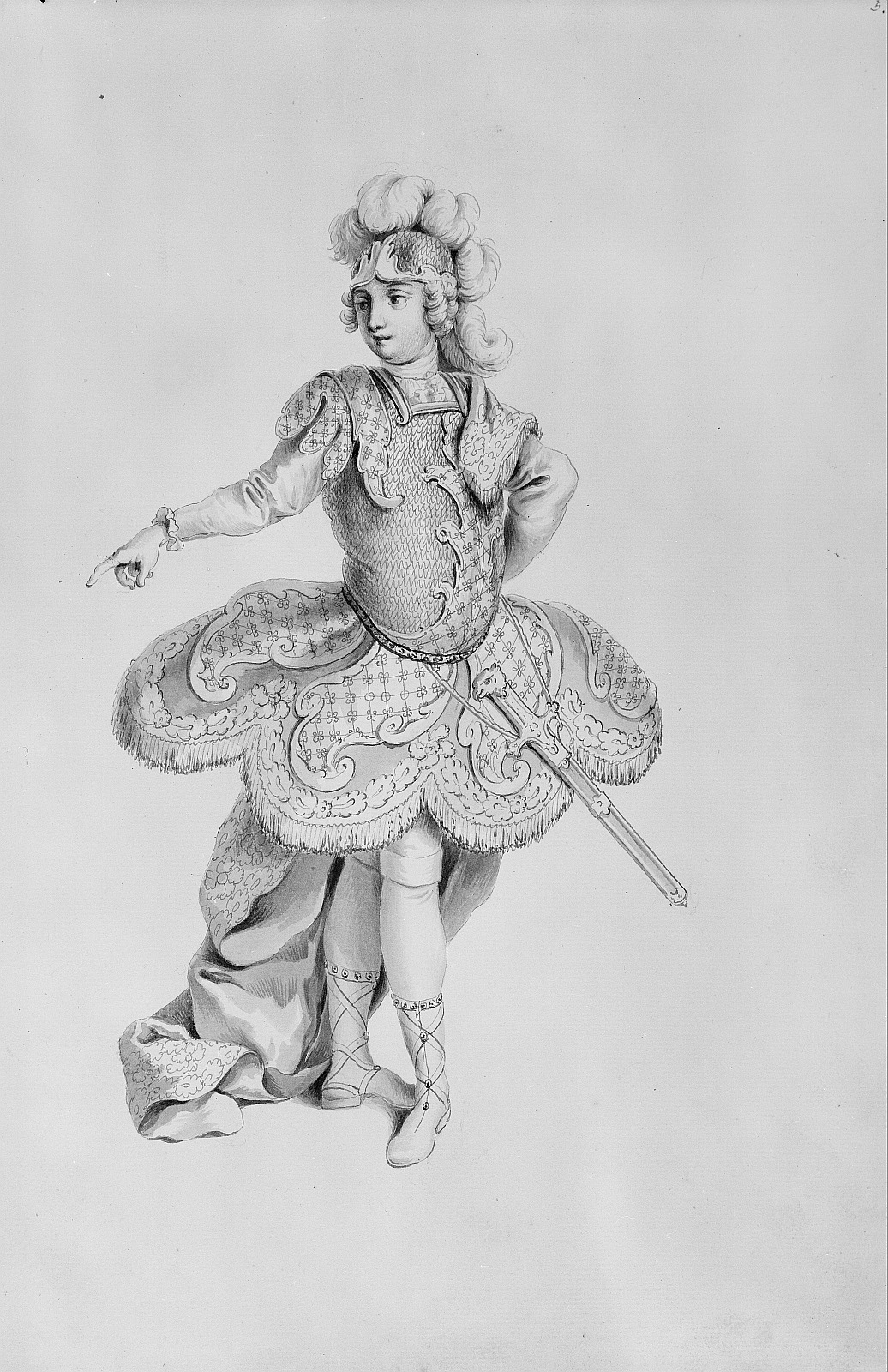
- Domenico Annibali in title role as Attilio Regolo
- Librettist: Pietro Metastasio
- Premiere: 12 January 1750; Opernhaus am Zwinger, Dresden

Attilio Regolo is an Italian-language opera seria by Johann Adolph Hasse based on the story of Marcus Atilius Regulus, a Roman general taken prisoner in Carthage who elects death rather than ransom. It has been acknowledged as a masterpiece of libretto writing, and is a paragon for the genre of opera seria. Pietro Metastasio wrote the libretto in 1740 for the name day of the emperor Charles VI, but the emperor's illness, then death, prevented the opera from being performed.

Metastasio continued to work on the libretto intermittently over the next nine years, having it performed several times under Empress Maria Theresa as a spoken play. In 1749, at the request of King Frederick Augustus II of Saxony, Metastasio famously supplied exacting notes to Hasse for its setting in music, despite the composer's having set several Metastasio librettos before. Hasse completed the score within three months of these instructions. It was not until 12 January 1750 that the premiere took place, at the Opernhaus am Zwinger in Dresden. The role of Regolo was taken by the castrato Domenico Annibali, while the role of Attilia was composed for Hasse's wife Faustina Bordoni.

== Roles ==
Roles, voice types, premiere cast
Role	Voice type	Premiere cast, 12 January 1750 Opernhaus am Zwinger, Dresden
Regolo	alto castrato	Domenico Annibali
Manlio, consul	tenor	Angelo Amorevoli
Attilia, daughter of Regolo	soprano	Faustina Bordoni-Hasse
Publio, son of Regolo	soprano (en travesti)	Regina Mingotti
Barce, noble African slave girl of Publio	soprano	Maria Rosa Negri
Licinio, tribune of the plebeians, lover of Attilia	bass	Giuseppe Schuster
Amilcare, ambassador of Carthage, lover of Barce	soprano	Venturo Rocchetti

== Synopsis ==
The action takes place outside Rome, near the temple of Bellona. Regolo has been sent back to Rome by the Carthaginians to negotiate peace, under oath to return under chains if unsuccessful. Upon returning to Rome, he instead argues against peace, urging continued war for the honour of Rome.

Despite the tears of his children, the prayers of his relatives, the entreaties of his friends, of the senate and of the people, the oath-bound Regolo refuses to remain in safety and returns to Carthage, where he faces certain torture and death.

=== Act I ===
In the atrium of Consul Manlio's palace, Attilia, daughter of the captive Regolo, resolves to confront Manlio publicly for neglecting her father's release, despite her lover Licinio's pleas for caution. Their exchange contrasts Attilia's sense of duty with Licinio's personal devotion, culminating in Licinio's aria asking for her to think of him too (aria 1. Tu sei figlia e lodo anch'io). Attilia confronts Manlio, denouncing Rome's ingratitude for leaving her father Regolo to languish in Carthaginian captivity despite his past heroism. Although touched, Manlio insists his duty as consul is to uphold Rome's honour rather than act out of pity, and he departs conflicted (aria 2. Mi crederai crudele).

Attilia, having lost hope in the consuls, learns from Barce and Publio that her father Regolo has returned to Rome as a captive accompanying the Carthaginian envoy. As the city of Rome rejoices, she yearns to share her newfound happiness with Licinio (aria 3. Goda con me s'io godo). Publio bids farewell to Barce, but when he learns that the Carthaginian envoy is Amilcare, he notices her sudden distress and realizes she may love him. Fearing confirmation of his suspicions, Publio stops her confession, choosing the comfort of uncertainty over an uncomfortable truth (aria 4. Se più felice oggetto). Alone, Barce rejoices at the thought of soon seeing her beloved (aria 5. Sol può dir che sia contento).

In the Temple of Bellona, Regolo, returned to Rome as a captive, delivers Carthage’s offer of peace but heroically urges the Senate to reject peace and the offer of prisoner exchange, declaring that Rome must never bargain with its honour (the accompanied recitative Ah questo oltraggio). Manlio and the senators defer their decision, torn between admiration for Regolo's courage and fear of losing so great a Roman (aria 6. Tu sprezzator di morte). Regolo, still bound, reaffirms that he will keep his promises to Carthage: he will return as a captive without negotiating exchanges, preserving Rome’s honour. Attilia and Licinio attempt to follow him and kiss his hand, but Regolo refuses any personal favours, declaring that his virtue remains intact even in chains (aria 7. Non perdo la calma).

Amilcare sees Barce, who expresses her distress to him. Torn between duty and love, Amilcare laments having to leave her (aria 8. Ah se ancor mia tu sei). Attilia and Barce discuss the political situation. Barce urges Attilia to use every possible means to intervene before the senators reconvene, but Attilia fears that her efforts may be in vain (aria 9. Mi parea del porto in seno). Barce is left alone, fearing that Amilcare might return to Carthage without her. Though she is troubled, she sings that anticipating an imagined disaster is mere folly (aria 10. Sempre è maggior del vero).

=== Act II ===
At the palace for the Carthaginian delegation, Regolo urges his son Publio to uphold the honour of Rome above personal feelings, emphasising that duty to the state outweighs individual safety. Publio admires his father's reasoning but struggles with the conflict between filial love and civic duty (aria 11. Ah se provar mi vuoi). Manlio meets with Regolo, who pledges to honour Regolo's guidance and defend his counsel in the Senate. Regolo accepts Manlio's friendship on the condition that both make sacrifices for Rome, and they affirm their mutual dedication to the state (aria 12. Oh qual fiamma di gloria, d'onore).

Licinio tells Regolo that both he and Attilia have worked tirelessly to sway the Senate to save Regolo, filling him with astonishment and gratitude. Yet, when Attilia approaches him, Regolo sternly reproaches both Licinio and Attilia, insisting that true Romans must act with virtue, and that their actions, though loving, cannot override the demands of public duty (aria 13. Taci; non è romano). Attilia laments her misfortune in risking her father’s displeasure by acting for his benefit. Licinio reassures her that her actions are virtuous, not blameworthy, and that Regolo will ultimately be grateful (aria 14. Da voi cari lumi). Attilia, now alone, prays for herself to be struck in her father’s stead, asking the gods to spare her father, and to honour his soul and the example he leaves (aria 15. Se più fulmini vi sono).

In the gallery, Regolo reflects on the mix of fear and anticipation stirring within him, despite having faced countless dangers before, and contemplates the supreme value of glory in human life (accompanied recitative: Tu palpiti o mio cor!). Publio informs Regolo that the Senate has rejected all offers, confirming that Regolo’s mission for Rome has succeeded. Regolo prepares to leave, entrusting Publio with the care of Attilia (aria 16. Non tradir la bella speme). Publio braces himself to uphold his duty, informing Attilia and Barce that Regolo will leave despite their distress. He then grants Barce her freedom, allowing her to go with Amilcare. Licinio and Amilcare set out to save Regolo, leaving Attilia and Barce with instructions to act wisely and courageously (aria 17. Se minore è in noi l'orgoglio).

Attilia and Barce discuss their fears and uncertainty over the dangers surrounding Regolo and the political turmoil; Attilia sings of a bright glimmer of hope (aria 18. Non è la mia speranza), after which Barce reflects on the danger of venturing into an unstable sea, recognising that true peril lies near the shore (aria 19. S'espone a perdersi).

=== Act III ===
In a large room in view of the gardens, Regolo entrusts Publio and Attilia to the care of Manlio, who promises to honour Regolo's legacy (aria 20. Fidati pur; rammento). Publio expresses his inner conflict of having great filial love for his father while facing the duty to obey him (aria 21. Sì, lo confesso). Amilcare offers to help Regolo escape from Rome, risking his own safety in Carthage, revealing his determination to act decisively when the moment comes hidden beneath an outward calm (aria 22. Fa' pur l'intrepido). Both Attilia and Publio plead with their father, but Regolo rebuffs them both; his aria reflects on the responsibility of a father to set a good example of courage for his children (aria 23. Io son padre e no 'l sarei).

Attilia expresses her admiration for her father's unwavering courage, comparing the passing of her emotional storm to the way the sky clears after rain (aria 24. Vuol tornar la calma in seno). Barce, alone, remarks on the strangeness of the ambitions and emotions in Rome (aria 25. Ceder l'amato oggetto).

On the banks of the Tiber, Manlio unsuccessfully attempts to clear the way for Regolo to board the departing ships, but Licinio and the people of Rome block him, asserting that Rome does not want Regolo to leave. In a series of accompanied recitatives in the final scene (of which there are three: "Regolo resti! Ed io l'ascolto?", then "No; possibil non è. De' miei romani", and finally "Romani addio. Siano i congedi estremi"), Regolo bids farewell to Rome while entrusting its people to uphold constancy, justice, and glory. The chorus of Romans bids its final farewell to this 'father of Rome' (final chorus: Onor di questa sponda).

== Recordings ==
- Attilio Regolo Axel Köhler (Regolo), Markus Schäfer (Manlio), Martina Borst (Attilia), Sibylla Rubens (Publio), Carmen Fuggiss (Barce), Michael Volle (Licinio), Randall Wong (Amilcare), Cappella Sagittariana Dresden, Frieder Bernius. concert performance 1997, Profil 2018

== Legacy ==
The verse dramatist Hannah More based her play, The Inflexible Captive (1774) on Metastasio's libretto. As she wrote in the introduction, 'In this, as well as in the general conduct of the story, she [More] has followed the Italian poet Metastasio, in his opera on this subject.'
