= Emilie Zumsteeg =

German composer (1796–1857)

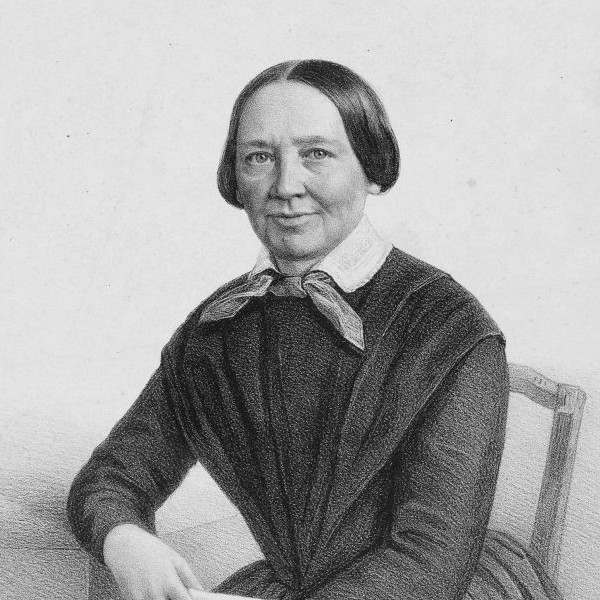
Among the songs composed by Zumsteeg was Morgenfreude (1:31)

Emilie Zumsteeg (9 December 1796 – 1 August 1857) was a German choral conductor, singer, composer, and pianist.

== Biography ==
Zumsteeg was born in Stuttgart (then in the Holy Roman Empire) where she lived for her whole life. She was one of seven children of the composer Johann Rudolf Zumsteeg and his wife Luise Andreä (1760–1837). Her father died when Emilie was just six years old. Her mother then ran a music store, which furthered her daughter's musical interest.

As a child, Zumsteeg took piano lessons with Gottlob Schick (1776–1812) and studied music theory with Wilhelm Sutor. She showed a facility at sight-reading. Gifted with a fine alto voice, she soon began singing and performing on the piano at the Stuttgart Museumskonzerte. As an adult she cultivated a circle of talented musicians and leading poets. The literary ties reflected her interest in the lied, which formed the basis of her composition.

In 1830, Zumsteeg founded the first women's choir in Württemberg. As a teacher of voice and piano, she made a living through music lessons and also as a leading member of the Verein für Klassische Kirchenmusik.

She died in Stuttgart at age 60.

== Compositions ==
Her compositions include about sixty songs, an overture, piano compositions, and three polonaises. She wrote several piano works, such as the early Trois Polonaises published in 1821 and favorably reviewed in the Allgemeine musikalische Zeitung; and sacred choral music. She was perhaps best known for her songs, which became popular in her homeland and beyond. One song in particular was later used by the Russian Baptist leader Ivan Prokhanov, and became widely known as the "Prisoners' Song". In 1842, she gained national press coverage for her composition Lieder, Op. 6, which received a brief but laudatory notice in the Allgemeine musikalische Zeitung

Zumsteeg's work was considered very innovative and creative for her time. The quality of her voice was reflected in the adventurousness of her compositions, sometimes requiring a larger vocal range than usual. An earlier collection of her work, Sechs Lieder, Op. 4, includes mainly simple, strophic songs, but occasionally reveals an Italianate flair, as in the second song, Morgenständchen. Zumsteeg's originality further surfaces in Neun Lieder for example, the hint of fantasy in Ich denke Dein and the chamber-like setting of Des Freundes Wunsch. Two of her lieder appear in the series Frauen komponieren

Her work has since been closely examined, praised for its creative liberties, and has been considered as possible influence for other leading composers such as Franz Schubert. "Her "Sehnsucht der Liebe", Op. 6 No. 4 for mezzo-soprano or contralto is considered a lovely song within modest boundaries well worthy of revival. The song is split into adagio first half and allegro vivace second half, demonstrating the coexistence of nocturnal peace and wakeful human passion. "The music she devised for this strophic song was clearly conceived with the first two verses in mind, as the details of word-painting and melodic design correspond exactly to those words and less aptly to the succeeding stanza." In the refrain she used "heartbeat" chordal figuration, and the simplicity is known to be particularly effective in the two-against-three rhythmic patterns of the preceding phrase."

A full evaluation of compositions must await further research into her life and the republication of more of her music.
