= Chapel (music) =

In music, chapel refers to a group of musicians.

== Origin: religious service ==
In European Christian tradition, church buildings had a body of clergymen responsible for the religious services, including the singing in these services. The group of performers could include instrumentalists. For the larger church buildings, like cathedrals, an apse chapel was used for rehearsing. That was also the place where choirbooks, instruments, and robes were kept. The name chapel transferred to the musical ensemble, and their director was known as chapel master.

The musicians of the Sistine Chapel and the Capella Julia were among the most famous of such groups of performers in the 16th century. Other examples of such chapels with a history going back to the Middle Ages include the Music Chapel of the Cathedral of Pamplona.

The genesis, development and organisation of such a musical chapel is documented for the Basilica of Tongeren, at the time one of the towns in the Prince-Bishopric of Liège: in the 15th century twenty canons are responsible for musical accompaniment of the religious services. By the end of the 16th century, the chapter expanded the chapel to a group of over twenty musicians, mostly singers, but by the end of the 17th century, also four to six instrumentalists. By that time, the canon-cantor (precentor) supervises three groups of musicians: the first is a fixed set of six vicars (here understood as spiritual musicians). These vicars have, by papal bull from 1444, six altars exclusively reserved for them, where they have to celebrate mass at least once a week. The succentor (singing-master) is the most important among them, needing to consecrate two more masses per week, and instructs the choristers. In order of importance, the succentor is followed by the organist and the bass, then the ordinary vicars. Somewhere in the 17th century, these last three vicars became expected to play an instrument too, usually a violin or a cello. In the 16th and 17th centuries, vicars were replaced after a few months or years, but after shorter intervals than they were in the 18th century. As exams to appoint a new vicar were open to candidates of a larger area, it follows that musicians often travelled from one region to another for their next employment.

The second group consisted of around seven or eight secular musicians, singers, and instrumentists, hired for short-term assignments depending on financial possibilities. The instruments include violin, cello, bassoon, trumpet and zink. About half of these musicians had an established connection to the chapter, in a role as sacristan, sexton, adult acolyte, or, exceptionally, former choristers who became chaplain. The others were often itinerant musicians additionally employed for some days in periods of high feasts. The third group was up to twelve choristers, modelled on the group of twelve choristers employed in the cathedral at Liège. These boys were educated from a very young age (sometimes only six years when starting) in a dedicated room above the ambulatory. The best of them stayed some time after voice change, as an instrumentist, or attending a position as vicar or adult musician.

== Worldly variants ==
From the 15th century, worldly rulers like the dukes of Burgundy and their Imperial successors tried to stabilise itinerant musicians into court chapels, for regularity in worship, and showing off splendour, which in the 16th century led to a network of musicians throughout Europe. Eventually, such chapels could become "a group of musicians that is not explicitly linked to regular worship, but to public feasts and functions".

Civic authorities would often employ a band for public functions: the term Alta cappella indicates such a 15th-16th century European town wind band.

== Later developments ==
Eventually, "Chapel", or one of its equivalents in other languages, became part of the name of diverse associations of musicians. Sometimes with a link to official instances:

- Queen Elisabeth Music Chapel (Belgium), primarily an institute for the formation of young musicians
- Staatskapelle, several orchestras in Germany
- Koninklijke muziekkapellen van Defensie (literally, "Royal Music Chapels of Defense"), a series of military bands in Belgium

Many private ensembles, where "chapel" often indicates the preference for a pre-classical music repertoire:

- Capilla Flamenca (Belgium)
- Capella Cracoviensis, Kraków
- Capella Savaria, Szombathely
- Capella Istropolitana, Bratislava
- La Capella Reial de Catalunya
- Capella Agostino Steffani, founded 1981, and fifteen years later renamed to Hannoversche Hofkapelle.
- Hofkapelle München, new formation in 2009, referring to a prior orchestra
- Neue Hofkapelle Graz, a new ensemble in the 2010s, with a name referring to a court chapel founded in 1564.

== See also ==
- a cappella
