= Mannheim Palace Church =

Building in Baden-Württemberg, Germany

Coordinates: 49°29′04″N 8°27′42″E

The Mannheim Palace Church (German: Mannheimer Schlosskirche), founded as a court chapel, was built in the 18th century and is part of the Mannheim Palace. The church served as court chapel for the prince-electors of the Electorate of the Palatinate between 1731 and 1777 and belongs to the oldest parish churches of the Old Catholic diocese in Germany.

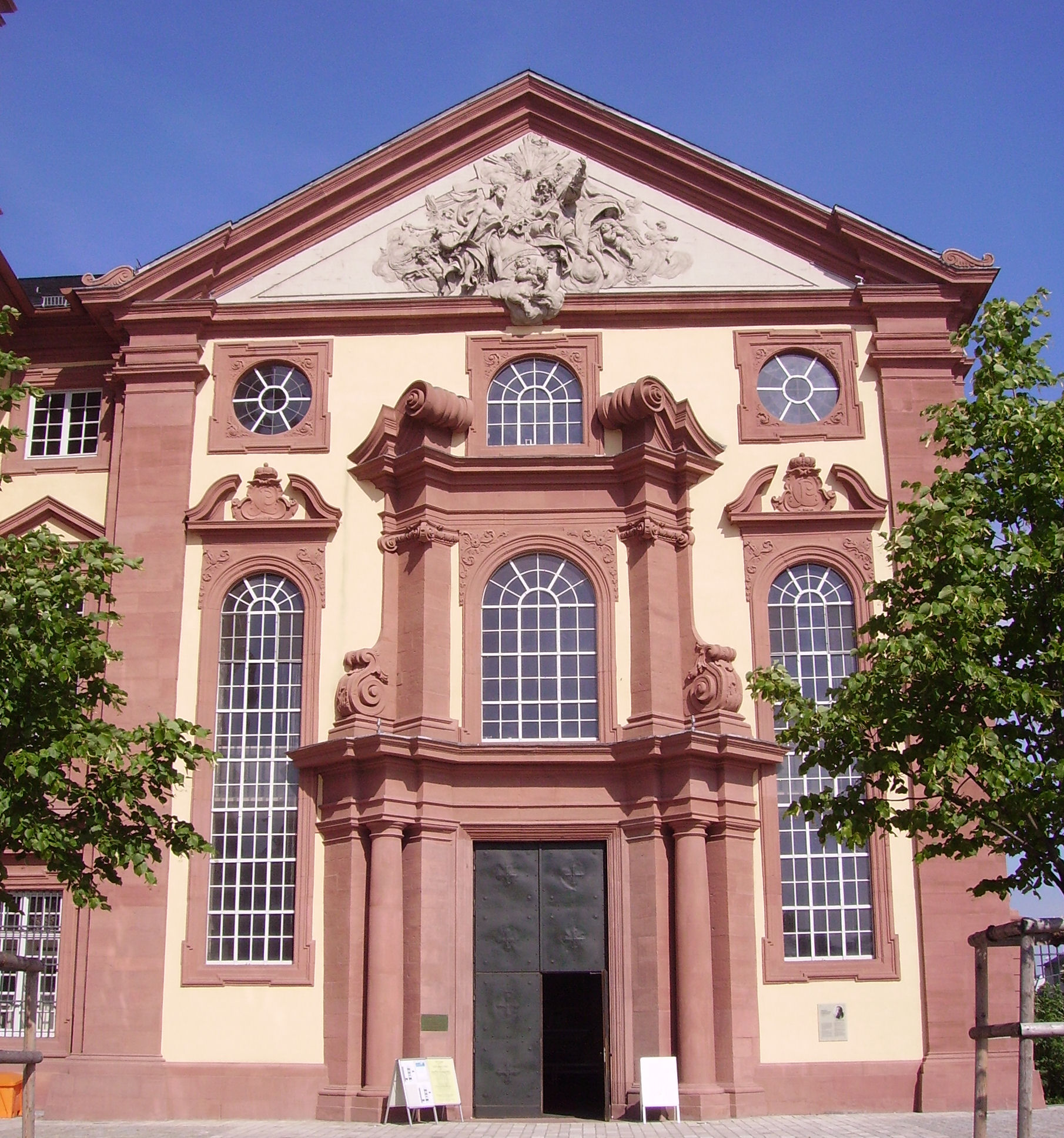
The Mannheim Palace Church - front view

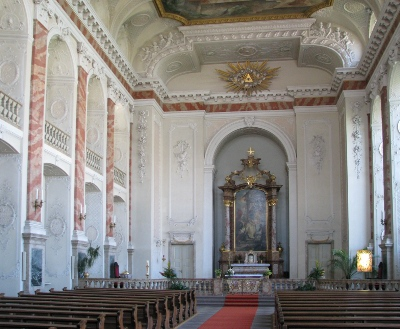
The Mannheim Palace Church - inside view

== Organ (music) ==
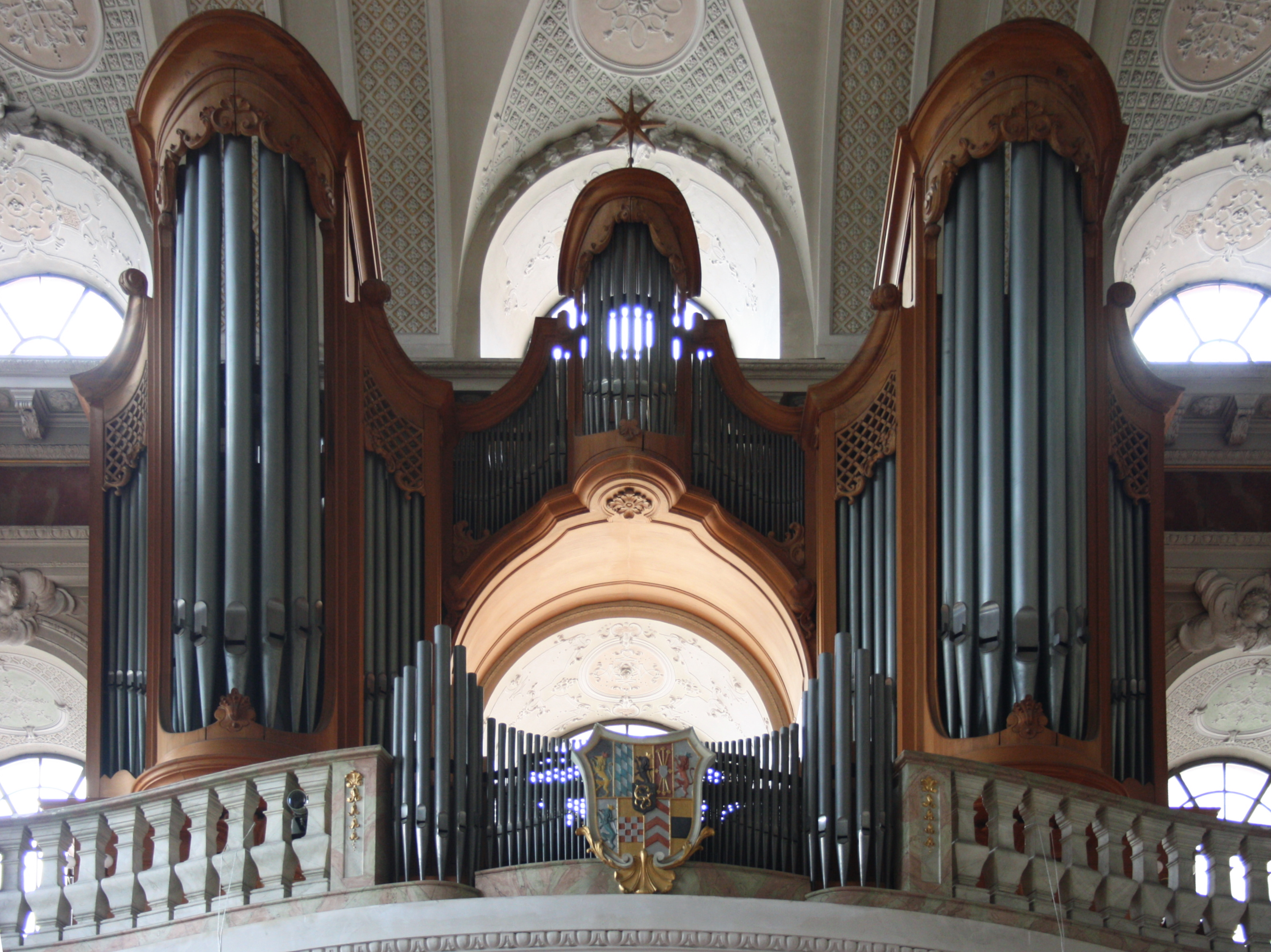
Mannheim's organ

The organ was built by the company Steinmeyer (Oettingen) in 1956 and is a musical keyboard instrument with 34 organ stops (3 transmissions in the pedal) and an electro-pneumatic tracker (Taschenladen). At the balustrade is the Rückpositiv located that carries ornaments with the seal of Charles Philip III .

I Hauptwerk C–g^{3}
1.	Principal	8′
2.	Gemshorn	8′
3.	Octave	4′
4.	Kleingedeckt	4′
5.	Octave	2′
6.	Mixture IV-VI	1^{1}/_{3}′
7.	Trumpet	8′

II Choir Division C–g^{3}
8.	Reed Pipe	8′
9.	Nachthorn	4′
10.	Principal	2′
11.	Fifth	1^{1}/_{3}′
12.	Oktävlein	1′
13.	Cromorne	8′
	Tremulant	

III Swell Organ C–g^{3}
14.	Pommer	16′
15.	Salicional	8′
16.	Gedeckt	8′
17.	Principal	4′
18.	Koppel Flute	4′
19.	Schwiegel	2′
20.	Nasard	2^{2}/_{3}′
21.	Third	1^{3}/_{5}′
22.	Scharff IV	1′
23.	Oboe	8′
	Tremulant	

Pedal C–f^{1}
24.	Principalbass	16′
25.	Subbass	16′
26.	Gedeckt (Nr. 14)	16′
27.	Oktavbass	8′
28.	Salicet (Nr. 15)	8′
29.	Choralbass	4′
30.	Rauschpfeife II	2^{2}/_{3}′
31.	Trombone	16′
32.	Trumpet	8′
33.	Basson (Nr. 23)	8′
34.	Clarion	4′

- Koppeln: II/I, III/I, III/II, I/P, II/P, III/P
- Spielhilfen: two free combinations, a free pedal combination, crescendo pedal

== Bells ==
There are three bells in the belfry, two of them are baroque bells that have their origins in the building time of the Mannheim Palace.

The sound of the bells during the Sunday church service

- Bell 1 h^{1}, diameter 814 mm, 319 kg, cast in 1731 by Mannheim's official bell caster Blasius Sattler
- Bell 2 dis^{2}, diameter 640 mm, 141 kg, cast in 1731 by Blasius Sattler
- Bell 3 fis^{2}, diameter 546 mm, 113 kg, cast in 1956 by Friedrich Wilhelm Schilling in Heidelberg

== See also ==
- Mannheim Palace
- Mannheim
- University of Mannheim

== Literature ==
- Hans Huth: Die Kunstdenkmäler des Stadtkreises Mannheim I. Munich 1982, ISBN 3-422-00556-0.
- Friedhelm Herborn: Schlosskirche Mannheim. 2. Auflage. Munich 1988.
- Alt-Katholische Kirchengemeinde Mannheim (Hrsg.): 120 Jahre Alt-Katholische Gemeinde in der Schlosskirche Mannheim. Mannheim 1994.
- Ferdinand Werner: Die kurfürstliche Residenz zu Mannheim. Worms 2006, ISBN 3-88462-235-8.
- Johannes Theil: … unter Abfeuerung der Kanonen: Gottesdienste, Kirchenfeste und Kirchenmusik in der Mannheimer Hofkapelle nach dem Kurpfälzischen Hof- und Staatskalender. Norderstedt 2008, ISBN 978-3-8370-2545-3.
- Reiner Albert, Günther Saltin: Katholisches Leben in Mannheim: Bd. 1, Von den Anfängen bis zur Säkularisation (1803). Ostfildern 2009, ISBN 978-3-7995-0908-4.
- Stadt Mannheim, Michael Caroli, Ulrich Nieß (Hrsg.): Geschichte der Stadt Mannheim: Bd 1 1607–1801. Ubstadt-Weiher 2007, ISBN 978-3-89735-470-8.
- Hartmut Ellrich, Alexander Wischniewski: Barockschloss Mannheim - Geschichte und Geschichten. Karlsruhe 2013, ISBN 978-3-7650-8629-8
