= Staatskapelle =

Staatskapelle is a denomination used by several German symphony and theatre orchestras. In the alphabetical order of their hometowns, they are:

- Staatskapelle Berlin
- Sächsische Staatskapelle Dresden
- Staatskapelle Halle
- Badische Staatskapelle (Karlsruhe)
- Mecklenburgische Staatskapelle (Schwerin)
- Staatskapelle Weimar.

== See also ==
- Court chapel (disambiguation)
