= Johann Rudolf Zumsteeg =

German composer and conductor (1760–1802)

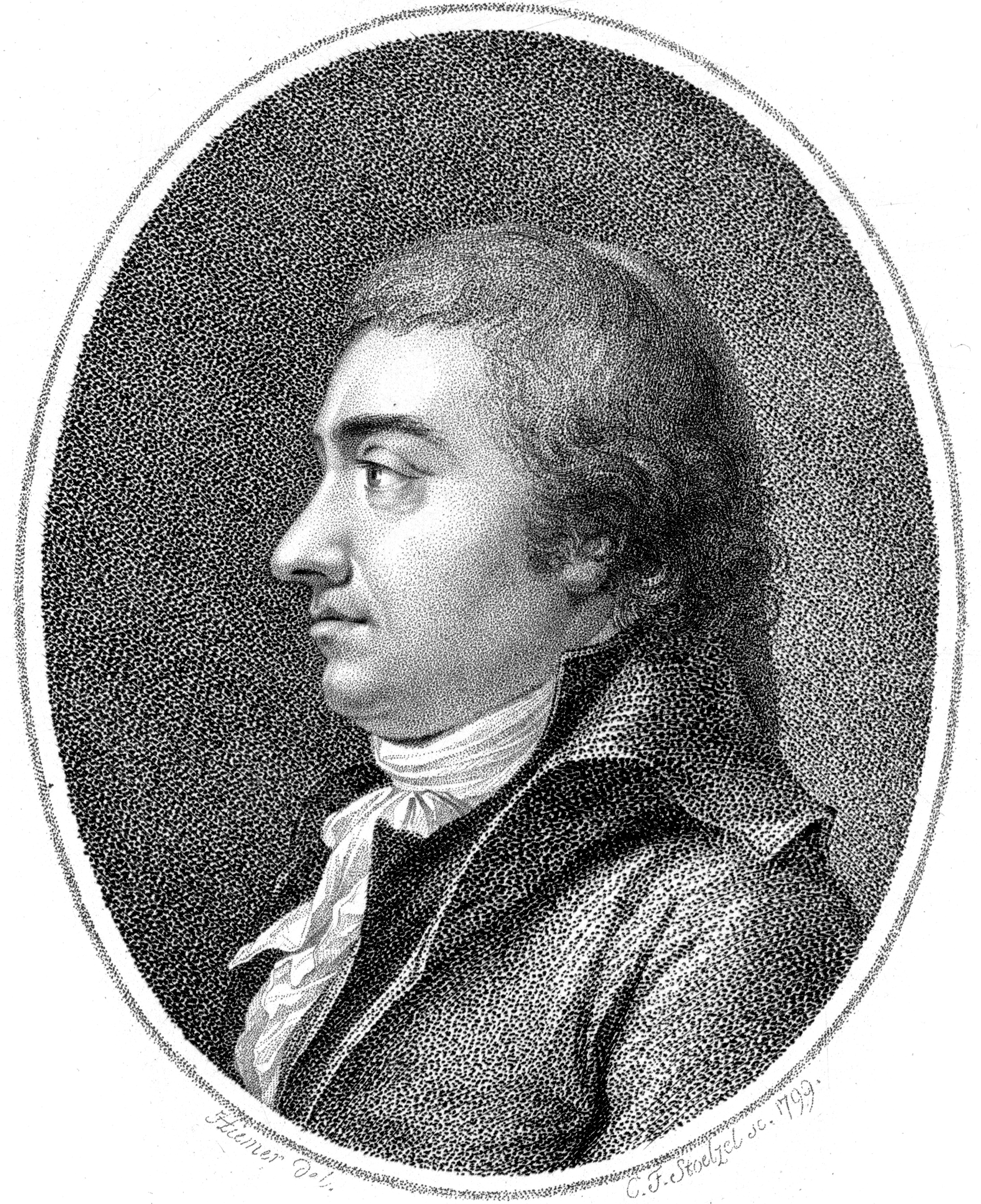
- Johann Rudolf Zumsteeg
- Born: 10 January 1760; Sachsenflur, Lauda-Königshofen, Baden-Württemberg, Germany
- Died: 27 January 1802 (aged 42)
- Occupations: Composer and conductor
- Spouse: Luise Andreae
- Children: 7, incl. Emilie Zumsteeg

Johann Rudolf Zumsteeg (10 January 1760 – 27 January 1802) was a German composer and conductor from the Classical period.

Zumsteeg championed the operas of Mozart in Stuttgart, staging the first performances there of Die Zauberflöte, Don Giovanni, and Così fan tutte. He also was a prolific composer of Lieder and ballads. His ballads had a great influence on the young Franz Schubert, who imitated a number of Zumsteeg's as studies (some even in exactly the same keys) while he was a teenager.

== Life and early career ==
Zumsteeg was born in Sachsenflur, Lauda-Königshofen, in a military camp to his father Rudolph Zum Steeg. He received an education at the Karlsschule Stuttgart after the death of both parents. Zumsteeg was initially admitted as a stucco worker, however his musical aptitude soon allowed him transfer to the music department. There Zumsteeg became intimate friends with Friedrich Schiller. A setting for Schiller's drama, Die Räuber (1782) is an example of the type of close collaboration that Zumsteeg undertook with prominent poets.

Zumsteeg showed promise as a virtuoso cellist, and in 1778 claimed the highest award in the performance division of the Karlsschule for the sixth time. Needless to say, when Zumsteeg began to try his hand at composing, his first works were for cello. Zumsteeg composed many smaller chamber works for cello and other instruments, but he held them in no high regard later in life. Zumsteeg studied cello with Eberhard Malterre and Agostino Poli, the later also instructed Zumsteeg in composition.

Zumsteeg's seven-volume composition Kleine Lieder und Balladen was published by Breitkopf & Härtel between 1800 and 1805. The volumes were highly popular in Germany, remaining well-known until the 1830s. According to Schubert's friend Joseph von Spaun, Schubert discovered them while at seminary. "He had several of Zumsteeg's songs in front of him and told me that these songs moved him profoundly...He said he could revel in these songs for days on end. And to this youthful predilection of his we probably owe the direction Schubert took."

In 1783, Zumsteeg married Luise Andreae with whom he had seven children. His daughter Emilie Zumsteeg became a composer too. Luise Andreae remained supportive of her husband in his tumultuous life as a musician.

== Musical style ==
Zumsteeg's ballads and lieders were creative. As a composer he was able to make the melodic line of his music follow the overarching mood that he was trying to portray through the lyrics. One of the ways he accomplished this was by not adjusting or manipulating the tempo of the piece. On the other hand, when the lyrics consisted of long poems, Zumsteeg experimented with changing the character and moods throughout his music to create drama and contrast. He often wandered in his music by going to relative and mediant keys as well as using enharmonic progressions. Zumsteeg was willing to explore new avenues of harmony in order to depict the mood he was trying to portray.

=== Musical influence ===
Franz Schubert admired Zumsteeg's lieder and ballads. Zumsteeg greatly influenced the early writings of Schubert. According to Schubert's friend Josef von Spaun, Schubert spent most of his days studying and analyzing Zumsteeg's works. In the years 1811 to 1816, Schubert's ballads closely resembled those of Zumsteeg. The similarities between Zumsteeg and Schubert's writings included: having a rhapsodic form, clear depiction of mood, and the utilization of recitative in their works. Six of Schubert's songs are closely based on Zumsteeg's settings of the same exact texts: "Hagars Klage" (D5), "Lied der Liebe" (D109), "Nachtgesang" (D314), "Ritter Toggenburg" (D397), "Die Erwartung" (D159), and "Skolie" (D507). In addition, there are close similarities between Zumsteeg and Schubert's choice in melodic structure, form, and selection of key and meter in these pieces.

== Later career ==
During most of his career, Zumsteeg was closely connected to the Swabian court, and in 1791 he was appointed to fill the vacancy left by C. F. D. Schubart's death at the Mimik-Institut. In 1792 Zumsteeg became concert master and subsequently director of music at the Wurttemberg court.

In this capacity, Zumsteeg championed the works of German composers, countering the dominant Italian influence at the court. He premiered Mozart's Die Zauberflöte in 1794. Following their successes, he staged performances of Don Giovanni and Così fan tutte.

Zumsteeg never ventured from his home in Stuttgart, and in his later life seldom left his house for anything other than his duties, but he provided accommodations to intellectuals travelling through Stuttgart. He was also well known as a scholar and spent much of his time studying French, Italian, and German literature. Zumsteeg died of a stroke at age 42 in Stuttgart.

=== Legacy ===
Zumsteeg had a profound effect on Franz Schubert, many of the latter's work took heavy inspiration from Zumsteeg. Zumsteeg's other works never brought him to celebrity, however some works continued to be performed after his death. His opera from Shakespeare's The Tempest, Die Geisterinsel, remained in the repertory for almost twenty years after its premiere in 1798 and has recently been recorded. After Johann's death, his wife Luise opened a music shop in his honour.

== Works ==
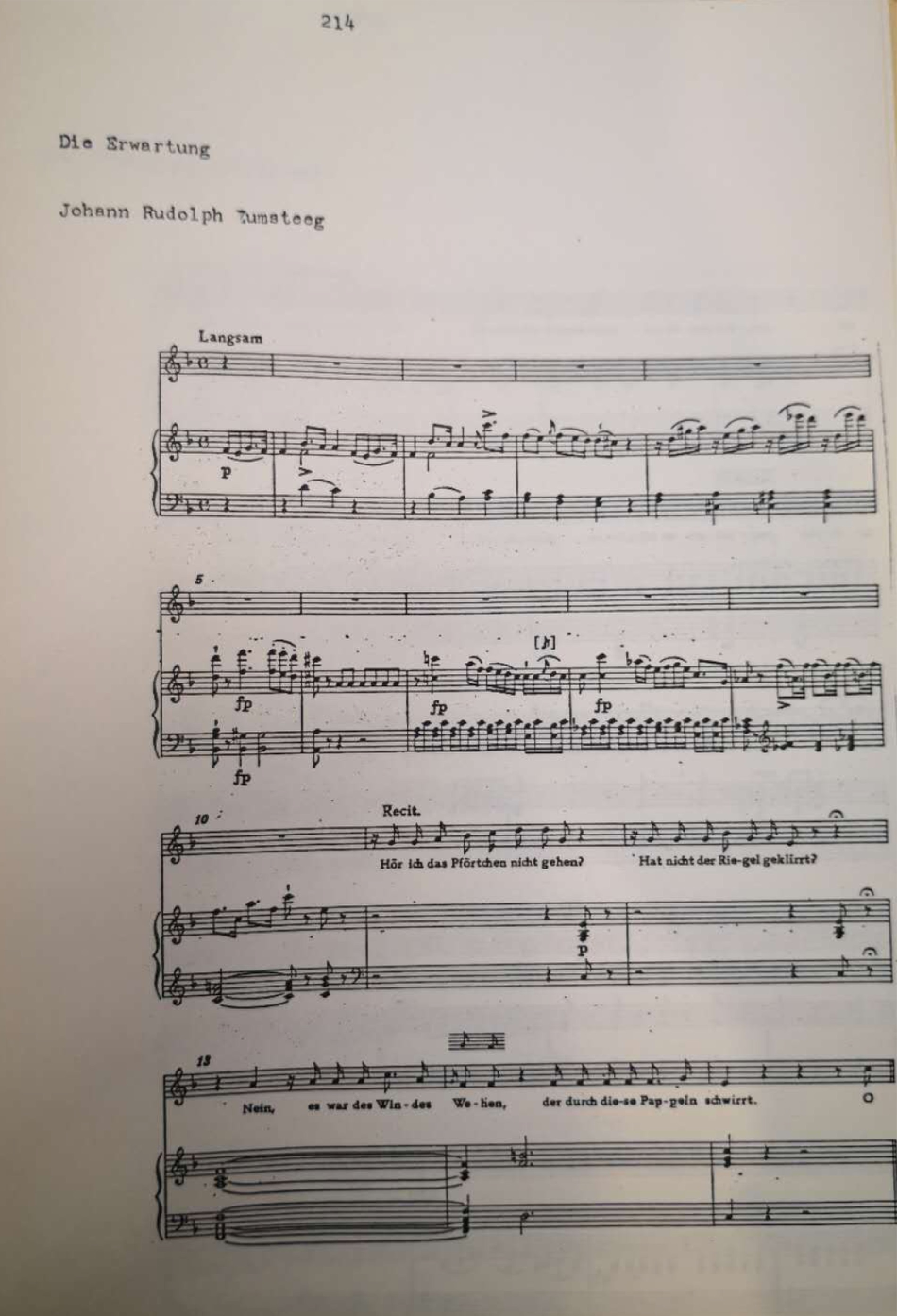
Opening of "Die Erwartung"

- Operas
  - Das tatarische Gesetz (1780)
  - Zalaor (1787)
  - Die Geisterinsel (1798) (premiered in 1805 in Dresden)
  - Das Pfauenfest (1801)
  - Elbondocani (1803)
- Duodrama
  - Tamira (1788)
- Ballads
  - Lenore
  - Des Pfarrers Tochter von Taubenhain
  - Die Büßende
  - Die Entführung
  - Das Lied von der Treue
  - Ritter Toggenburg
