= Benda (surname) =

Benda (feminine: Bendová) is a Czech and Slovak surname. The name originated as a pet form of the given name Benedikt. The surname is also widespread in German-speaking countries. Notable people with the surname include:

== Members of Benda family of musicians ==
- Christian Benda (born 20th century), Czech cellist, composer and conductor
- Franz Benda (1709–1786), violin virtuoso and composer
- Friedrich Benda (1745–1814), German violinist, pianist and composer
- Friedrich Ludwig Benda (1746–1792), German composer and violinist
- Georg Benda (1722–1795), Czech kapellmeister, violinist and composer
- Hans von Benda (1888–1972), German conductor
- Johann Friedrich Ernst Benda (1749–1785), German violinist and harpsichordist
- Johann Georg Benda (1713–1752), Czech violinist and composer
- Joseph Benda (1724–1804), Czech violinist and composer
- Juliane Reichardt, née Benda (1752–1783), German singer, pianist and composer
- Karl Hermann Heinrich Benda (1748–1836), German violinist and composer
- Louise Reichardt (1779–1826), German songwriter and composer
- Maria Carolina Wolf, née Benda (1742–1820), singer, pianist and composer

== Other people ==
- Adolf Benda (1845–1878), Czech regional historian and jewelry craftsman
- Alice Bendová (born 1973), Czech actress and model
- Andrej Benda (born 1975), Slovak bobsledder
- Antal Benda (1910–1997), Hungarian field handball player
- Arthur Benda (1885–1969), German photographer
- Břetislav Benda (1897–1983), Czech sculptor
- Ernst Benda (1925–2009), German politician and jurist
- Felix Benda (1708–1768), Czech composer
- Friederike Benda (born 1987), German politician
- Harry J. Benda (1919–1971), American political scientist
- Jan Benda (born 1972), Belgian-German ice hockey player
- Jaroslav Benda (1882–1970), Czech artist
- John Benda (born 1947), American golfer
- Julien Benda (1867–1956), French philosopher and novelist
- Kenneth Benda (1902–1978), English actor
- Karol Benda (1893–1942), Polish actor and director
- Krista Bendová (1923–1988), Slovak writer and poet
- Marek Benda (born 1968), Czech politician
- Nancy Tribble Benda (1930–2015), American actress and educator
- Petr Benda (born 1982), Czech basketball player
- Steven Benda (born 1998), German footballer
- Václav Benda (1946–1999), Czech political activist and mathematician
- Willy Benda (1870–1929), German cellist and conductor
- Władysław T. Benda (1873–1948), Polish-American painter and illustrator

== See also ==
- Franz von Benda-Beckmann (1941–2013), German legal anthropologist
