= Karl Hermann Heinrich Benda =

German violinist and composer

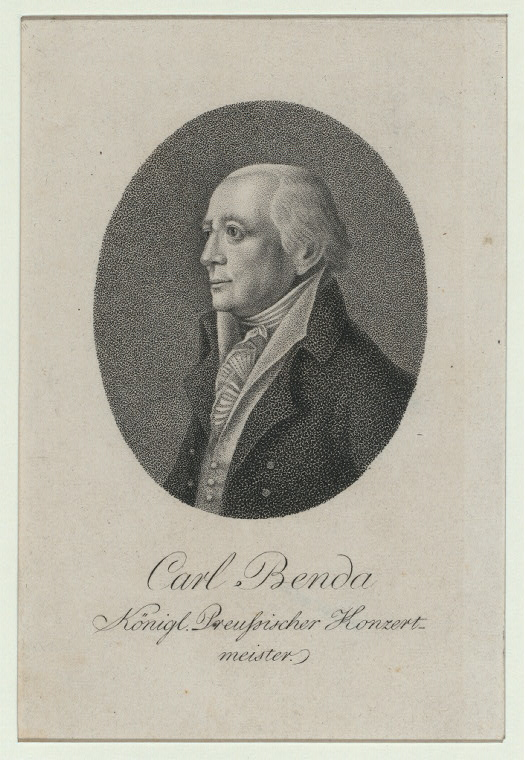
Karl (Carl) Hermann Heinrich Benda

Karl Hermann Heinrich Benda (also Carl Benda), (baptised 2 May 1748 – 15 March 1836) was a German violinist and composer of Bohemian origin.

== Life ==
Karl Benda was the younger of two sons of the violinist and composer Franz Benda. His godparents were the margraves Friedrich Heinrich (Brandenburg-Schwedt) and Karl Friedrich Albrecht von Brandenburg-Schwedt as well as the Russian envoy Hermann Carl von Keyserlingk. Like his sisters Wilhelmine, Maria Carolina, Sophie Anna Henriette, Juliane and his brother Friedrich, he received music lessons from his father Franz Benda. In 1766, Karl was accepted in the Hofkapelle.

As a violin virtuoso, especially in his performance of adagios, Karl Benda closely resembled his father. They were also said to be similar in character, stature and physiognomy. He was also a prized piano teacher; among his students were King Friedrich Wilhelm III as well as his brother Ludwig, who gave him a lifelong patronage. Other students of Karl Benda were Carl Friedrich Rungenhagen, the actor and singer Friedrich Ludwig Seidel and the singer Luise Rudorff, whom he saw performing in the Weimarer Hoftheater in 1792, when he was visiting his sisters Wilhelmine and Maria Carolina. Karl Benda was also accompanist at the Royal Opera in Berlin. In 1802, he became successor to his deceased uncle Joseph Benda, who was a concertmaster at the Hofkapelle in Berlin.

=== Descendants ===
In 1777, Karl Benda married a daughter of the war minister Friedrich August Barth, with whom he had a son August Wilhelm Heinrich Ferdinand (1779–1861). On 28 April 1825, while employed as Kammerdirektor for the princes of Thurn und Taxis, he was raised to the nobility by the Bavarian King. Descendants of Wilhelm von Benda's include the MP and landlord Karl Friedrich Wilhelm Robert von Benda (1816–1899), the officer Hans Robert Heinrich von Benda (1856–1919) as well as the officer and conductor Hans Gustav Robert von Benda (1888–1972), who was assigned to write Franz Lorenz's biography Die Musikerfamilie Benda with documents and photos from his private collection.

After the death of his first wife, Karl Benda married the daughter of Freytag, a renowned cloth maker from Potsdam, with whom he had a son Friedrich August Benda (1786–1854). The latter also pursued a career in higher civil service and was a committed patron of music on the board of several societies, including the Sing-Akademie zu Berlin.

== See also ==
- Benda (surname)
- Benda

== Works ==
- Concerto in F major for viola, strings and continuo
- Sonata in E-flat major for violin and continuo (dated April 1, 1785)
- Sonata in F major for violin and continuo (dated †February 16, 1785)
- Sechs Adagios für das Pianoforte nebst Bemerkungen über Spiel und Vortrag des Adagio von Carl Benda pensionirtem Königl. Preuß. Kapellmeister
