= List of compositions by Franz Benda =

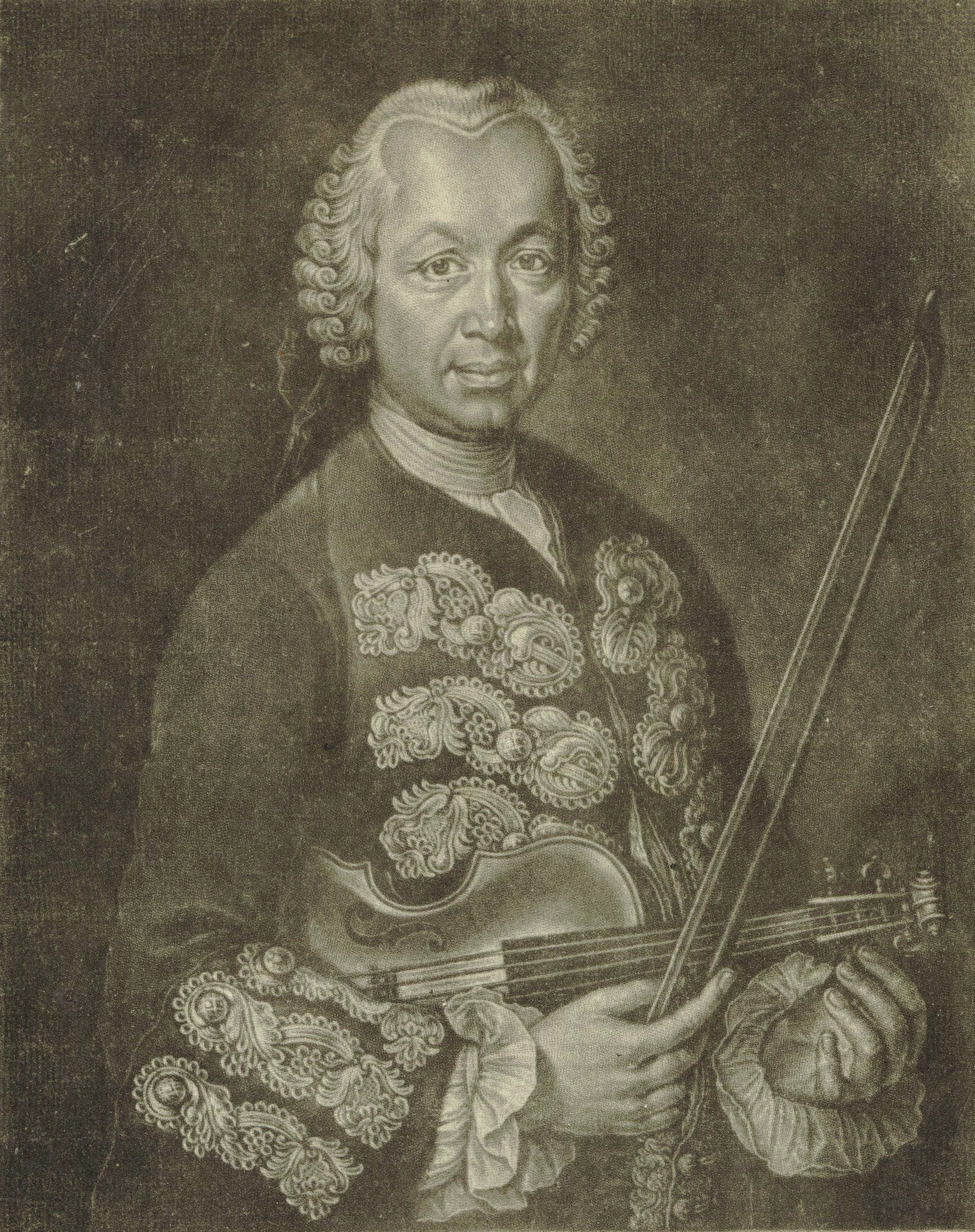
Franz Benda

This is a list of compositions by Franz Benda (1709–1786). They are classified by "L" numbers according to the catalogue of Douglas A. Lee.

== Symphonies ==
- L I:1 – Symphony No. 1 in C major
- L I:2 – Symphony No. 2 in C major
- L I:3 – Symphony No. 3 in D major
- L I:4 – Symphony No. 4 in D major
- L I:5 – Symphony No. 5 in F major
- L I:6 – Symphony No. 6 in G major
- L I:7 – Symphony No. 7 in G major
- L I:8 – Symphony No. 8 in A major
- L I:9 – Symphony No. 9 in B♭ major
- L I:10 – Symphony No.10 in B♭ major
- L I:11 – Symphony No.11 in E♭ major
- L I:12 – Symphony No.12 in F major
- L I:13 – Symphony No.13 in G major
- L I:14 – Symphony No.14 in A major
- L I:15 – Symphony in C major
- L I:16 – Symphony in F major
- L I:17 – Symphony in G major

== Concertos ==
- L II:1 – Violin Concerto in C major
- L II:2 – Violin Concerto in D major
- L II:3 – Violin Concerto in D major
- L II:4 – Violin Concerto in D minor
- L II:5 – Violin Concerto in E♭ major
- L II:6 – Violin Concerto in E major
- L II:7 – Violin Concerto in E major (mostly lost)
- L II:8 – Violin Concerto in E major
- L II:9 – Violin Concerto in F major
- L II:10 – Violin Concerto in G major
- L II:11 – Flute Concerto in G major
- L II:12 – Violin Concerto in A♭ major
- L II:13 – Violin Concerto in A major
- L II:14 – Violin Concerto in A major
- L II:15 – Violin Concerto in A major
- L II:16 – Flute Concerto in A minor
- L II:17 – Violin Concerto in B♭ major
- L II:18 – Violin Concerto in B♭ major
- L II:19 – Violin Concerto in C major (Georg Benda)
- L II:20 – Violin Concerto in B♭ major (Joseph Riepel)
- L II:21 – Violin Concerto in B♭ major (Johann Benda)
- L II:22 – Violin Concerto in G major (Johann Gottlieb Graun)
- L II:23 – Violin Concerto in E major (lost)
- L II:24 – Violin Concerto in E minor (lost)
- L II:25 – Violin Concerto in G major (lost)
- L II:26 – Violin Concerto in B♭ major (lost)
- L II:27 – Violin Concerto in B♭ major (lost)
- L II:28 – Violin Concerto in B minor (lost)

== Sonatas for instrument & basso continuo ==
- L III:1 – Violin Sonata Op. 1 No.3 in C major
- L III:2 – Violin Sonata in C major
- L III:3 – Violin Sonata in C major
- L III:4 – Violin Sonata in C major
- L III:5 – Violin Sonata in C major
- L III:6 – Flute Sonata in C major
- L III:7 – Violin Sonata in C major
- L III:8 – Violin Sonata in C minor
- L III:9 – Violin Sonata in C minor
- L III:10 – Violin Sonata in C minor
- L III:11 – Violin Sonata in C minor
- L III:12 – Violin Sonata in C minor
- L III:13 – Violin Sonata in C minor
- L III:14 – Violin Sonata in C minor
- L III:15 – Violin Sonata in C minor
- L III:16 – Violin Sonata in D major
- L III:17 – Violin Sonata in D major
- L III:18 – Violin Sonata in D major
- L III:19 – Violin Sonata in D major
- L III:20 – Violin Sonata in D major
- L III:21 – Violin Sonata in D major
- L III:22 – Flute Sonata in D major
- L III:23 – Violin Sonata in D major
- L III:24 – Flute Sonata in D major
- L III:25 – Violin Sonata in D major
- L III:26 – Violin Sonata in D major
- L III:27 – Violin Sonata in D major
- L III:28 – Violin Sonata in D major
- L III:29 – Violin Sonata in D minor
- L III:30 – Violin Sonata in D minor
- L III:31 – Violin Sonata in D minor
- L III:32 – Violin Sonata in D minor
- L III:33 – Violin Sonata in E♭ major
- L III:34 – Violin Sonata in E♭ major
- L III:35 – Violin Sonata in E♭ major
- L III:36 – Violin Sonata in E♭ major
- L III:37 – Violin Sonata in E♭ major
- L III:38 – Violin Sonata in E♭ major
- L III:39 – Violin Sonata in E♭ major
- L III:40 – Violin Sonata in E♭ major
- L III:41 – Violin Sonata in E♭ major
- L III:42 – Violin Sonata in E♭ major
- L III:43 – Violin Sonata in E♭ major
- L III:44 – Violin Sonata in E major
- L III:45 – Violin Sonata in E major
- L III:46 – Violin Sonata in E major
- L III:47 – Violin Sonata Op. 1 No.1 in E major
- L III:48 – Violin Sonata in E major
- L III:49 – Violin Sonata in E major
- L III:50 – Violin Sonata in E major
- L III:51 – Violin Sonata Op. 1 No.5 in E major
- L III:52 – Violin Sonata in E major
- L III:53 – Violin Sonata in E major
- L III:54 – Violin Sonata in E major
- L III:55 – Violin Sonata in E major
- L III:56 – Flute Sonata in E minor
- L III:57 – Flute Sonata in E minor
- L III:58 – Violin Sonata in E minor
- L III:59 – Violin Sonata in E minor
- L III:60 – Violin Sonata in E minor
- L III:61 – Violin Sonata in E minor
- L III:62 – Violin Sonata in F major
- L III:63 – Violin Sonata in F major
- L III:64 – Violin Sonata in F major
- L III:65 – Violin Sonata in F major
- L III:66 – Violin Sonata in F major
- L III:67 – Violin Sonata in F major
- L III:68 – Violin Sonata in F major
- L III:69 – Violin Sonata in F major
- L III:70 – Violin Sonata in F major
- L III:71 – Violin Sonata in F major
- L III:72 – Violin Sonata in F major
- L III:73 – Violin Sonata in F minor
- L III:74 – Violin Sonata in G major
- L III:75 – Violin Sonata in G major
- L III:76 – Violin Sonata in G major
- L III:77 – Violin Sonata in G major
- L III:78 – Violin Sonata in G major
- L III:79 – Violin Sonata in G major
- L III:80 – Violin Sonata in G major
- L III:81 – Violin Sonata in G major
- L III:82 – Violin Sonata in G major
- L III:83 – Violin Sonata in G major
- L III:84 – Violin Sonata in G major
- L III:85 – Violin Sonata in G major
- L III:86 – Violin Sonata in G major
- L III:87 – Violin Sonata in G major
- L III:88 – Violin Sonata in G major
- L III:89 – Violin Sonata in G minor
- L III:90 – Violin Sonata in G minor
- L III:91 – Violin Sonata in G minor
- L III:92 – Violin Sonata in A♭ major
- L III:93 – Violin Sonata in A major
- L III:94 – Violin Sonata in A major
- L III:95 – Violin Sonata Op. 1 No.6 in A major
- L III:96 – Violin Sonata in A major
- L III:97 – Violin Sonata in A major
- L III:98 – Violin Sonata Op. 1 No.2 in A major
- L III:99 – Violin Sonata in A major
- L III:100 – Violin Sonata in A major
- L III:101 – Violin Sonata in A major
- L III:102 – Violin Sonata in A major
- L III:103 – Violin Sonata in A major
- L III:104 – Violin Sonata in A major
- L III:105 – Violin Sonata in A major
- L III:106 – Violin Sonata in A major
- L III:107 – Violin Sonata in A major
- L III:108 – Violin Sonata in A major
- L III:109 – Violin Sonata in A major
- L III:110 – Violin Sonata in A major
- L III:111 – Violin Sonata in A major
- L III:112 – Violin Sonata in A major
- L III:113 – Violin Sonata in A major
- L III:114 – Violin Sonata in A major
- L III:115 – Violin Sonata in A major
- L III:116 – Violin Sonata in A minor
- L III:117 – Violin Sonata in A minor
- L III:118 – Violin Sonata in A minor
- L III:119 – Violin Sonata in A minor
- L III:120 – Violin Sonata in A minor
- L III:121 – Violin Sonata Op. 1 No.4 in A minor
- L III:122 – Violin Sonata in A minor
- L III:123 – Violin Sonata in B♭ major
- L III:124 – Violin Sonata in B♭ major
- L III:125 – Violin Sonata in B♭ major
- L III:126 – Violin Sonata in B♭ major
- L III:127 – Violin Sonata in B♭ major
- L III:128 – Violin Sonata in B♭ major
- L III:129 – Violin Sonata in B♭ major
- L III:130 – Violin Sonata in B♭ major
- L III:131 – Violin Sonata in B♭ major
- L III:132 – Violin Sonata in B♭ major
- L III:133 – Violin Sonata in B♭ major
- L III:134 – Violin Sonata in B♭ major
- L III:135 – Violin Sonata in B♭ major
- L III:136 – Violin Sonata in B♭ major
- L III:137 – Violin Sonata in B♭ major
- L III:138 – Violin Sonata in B♭ minor
- L III:139 – Violin Sonata in B minor
- L III:140 – Violin Sonata in C major
- L III:141 – Violin Sonata in D major
- L III:142 – Flute Sonata in D major
- L III:143 – Violin Sonata in D major
- L III:144 – Violin Sonata in E♭ major
- L III:145 – Violin Sonata in E♭ major
- L III:146 – Violin Sonata in E major
- L III:147 – Violin Sonata in F major
- L III:148 – Violin Sonata in G major
- L III:149 – Violin Sonata in G major
- L III:150 – Violin Sonata in G minor
- L III:151 – Violin Sonata in G minor
- L III:152 – Violin Sonata in A major
- L III:153 – Violin Sonata in A major
- L III:154 – Violin Sonata in A major
- L III:155 – Violin Sonata in A major
- L III:156 – Oboe Sonata in B♭ major
- L III:157 – Violin Sonata in B♭ major
- L III:158 – Violin Sonata in B♭ major
- L III:159 – Violin Sonata in B♭ major
- L III:160 – Sonata for keyboard & flute Op. 5 No.2 in C major
- L III:161 – Sonata for keyboard & flute Op. 5 No.3 in E major
- L III:162 – Sonata for keyboard & flute Op. 5 No.1 in F major
- L III:163 – Violin Sonata in G major (Friedrich Ludwig Benda)
- L III:164 – Violin Sonata in A major (Joseph Benda)
- L III:165 – Violin Sonata in F major (lost)
- L III:166 – Violin Sonata in A major (lost)
- L III:167 – Violin Sonata in A minor (lost)
- L III:168 – Violin Sonata in C minor (lost)
- L III:169 – Violin Sonata in D major (lost)
- L III:170 – Flute Sonata in D major (lost)
- L III:171 – Violin Sonata in D major (lost)
- L III:172 – Oboe Sonata in D minor (lost)
- L III:173 – Violin Sonata in E♭ major (lost)
- L III:174 – Bassoon Sonata in F major (lost)
- L III:175 – Violin Sonata in A major (lost)
- L III:176 – Violin Sonata in A major (lost)
- L III:177 – Violin Sonata in A major (lost)
- L III:178 – Violin Sonata in A major (lost)
- L III:179 – Violin Sonata in A minor (lost)
- L III:180 – Oboe Sonata in B♭ major (lost)
- L III:181 – Bassoon Sonata in B♭ major (lost)
- L III:182 – Bassoon Sonata in B♭ major (lost)

== Trio sonatas ==
- L IV:1 – Sonata for 2 flutes & continuo in G major
- L IV:2 – Sonata for 2 violins & continuo in A major
- L IV:3 – Sonata for 2 violins & continuo in D major (Graun)
- L IV:4 – Sonata for 2 violins & continuo in G major (Graun)
- L IV:5 – Sonata for violin, keyboard & continuo in D major (lost)
- L IV:6 – Sonata for violin, bassoon & continuo in F major (lost)
- L IV:7 – Sonata for flute & keyboard obligato in G major
- L IV:8 – Sonata for violin, flute & continuo in G major (lost)
- L IV:9 – Sonata for 2 violins & continuo in B♭ major (lost)
- L IV:10 – Sonata for violin & keyboard in B♭ major (lost)

== Duets for 2 violins ==
- L V:1 – Violins Duet No. 1 in C major
- L V:2 – Violins Duet No. 5 in C major
- L V:3 – Violins Duet No. 2 in C major
- L V:4 – Violins Duet No. 8 in C major
- L V:5 – Violins Duet No.11 in C major
- L V:6 – Violins Duet No. 4 in C major
- L V:7 – Violins Duet No. 9 in C major
- L V:8 – Violins Duet No. 3 in C major
- L V:9 – Violins Duet No.22 in C minor
- L V:10 – Violins Duet No.21 in C minor
- L V:11 – Violins Duet No.19 in D major
- L V:12 – Violins Duet No.20 in D major
- L V:13 – Violins Duet No.18 in D minor
- L V:14 – Violins Duet No.13 in E minor
- L V:15 – Violins Duet No.17 in F major
- L V:16 – Violins Duet No.10 in G major
- L V:17 – Violins Duet No.16 in G major
- L V:18 – Violins Duet No.12 in G major
- L V:19 – Violins Duet No. 6 in G major
- L V:20 – Violins Duet No. 7 in G major
- L V:21 – Violins Duet No.14 in A minor
- L V:22 – Violins Duet No.15 in A minor
- L V:23 – Violins Duet in C major
- L V:24 – Violins Duet in C major
- L V:25 – Violins Duet in C major
- L V:26 – Violins Duet in E♭ major
- L V:27 – Violins Duet in E minor
- L V:28 – Violins Duet in F major
- L V:29 – Violins Duet in F major
- L V:30 – Violins Duet in G major
- L V:31 – Violins Duet in A minor

== Solo violin pieces ==
- L VI:1 – Violin Capriccio No.62 in C major
- L VI:2 – Violin Capriccio No. 1 in C major
- L VI:3 – Violin Capriccio No.39 in C major
- L VI:4 – Violin Capriccio No.69 in C minor
- L VI:5 – Violin Capriccio No. 6 in C minor
- L VI:6 – Violin Capriccio No.48 in C minor
- L VI:7 – Violin Capriccio No.61 in C minor
- L VI:8 – Violin Capriccio No.70 in C minor
- L VI:9 – Violin Capriccio No.41 in C minor
- L VI:10 – Violin Capriccio No.18 in C♯ major
- L VI:11 – Violin Capriccio No.20 in D♭ major
- L VI:12 – Violin Capriccio No.15 in C♯ minor
- L VI:13 – Violin Capriccio No.42 in D major
- L VI:14 – Violin Capriccio No. 4 in D major
- L VI:15 – Violin Capriccio in D major (fragment)
- L VI:16 – Violin Capriccio No.92 in D major
- L VI:17 – Violin Capriccio No.94 in D major
- L VI:18 – Violin Capriccio No.25 in D minor
- L VI:19 – Violin Capriccio No.30 in E♭ major
- L VI:20 – Violin Capriccio No.28 in E♭ major
- L VI:21 – Violin Capriccio No.65 in E♭ major
- L VI:22 – Violin Capriccio No.91 in E♭ major
- L VI:23 – Violin Capriccio No. 7 in E♭ major
- L VI:24 – Violin Capriccio No.90 in E♭ major
- L VI:25 – Violin Capriccio No.64 in E♭ major
- L VI:26 – Violin Capriccio No.36 in E♭ minor
- L VI:27 – Violin Capriccio No.34 in E major
- L VI:28 – Violin Capriccio No.14 in E major
- L VI:29 – Violin Capriccio No.13 in E minor
- L VI:30 – Violin Capriccio No.71 in F major
- L VI:31 – Violin Capriccio No.33 in F major
- L VI:32 – Violin Capriccio No.24 in F major
- L VI:33 – Violin Capriccio No.29 in F major
- L VI:34 – Violin Capriccio No.95 in F major
- L VI:35 – Violin Capriccio No.72 in F major
- L VI:36 – Violin Capriccio No.27 in F minor
- L VI:37 – Violin Capriccio No.93 in F minor
- L VI:38 – Violin Capriccio No.96 in F minor
- L VI:39 – Violin Capriccio No.22 in F minor
- L VI:40 – Violin Capriccio No.17 in F♯ major
- L VI:41 – Violin Capriccio No.37 in G♭ major
- L VI:42 – Violin Capriccio No.16 in F♯ minor
- L VI:43 – Violin Capriccio in G major
- L VI:44 – Violin Capriccio No.51 in G major
- L VI:45 – Violin Capriccio No.11 in G major
- L VI:46 – Violin Capriccio No.12 in G major
- L VI:47 – Violin Capriccio in G major
- L VI:48 – Violin Capriccio No.35 in G major
- L VI:49 – Violin Capriccio No.89 in G minor
- L VI:50 – Violin Capriccio No.40 in G minor
- L VI:51 – Violin Capriccio No. 8 in G minor
- L VI:52 – Violin Capriccio No.38 in A major
- L VI:53 – Violin Capriccio No. 9 in A major
- L VI:54 – Violin Capriccio No.26 in A major
- L VI:55 – Violin Capriccio No.31 in A major
- L VI:56 – Violin Capriccio No.98 in A major
- L VI:57 – Violin Capriccio No.97 in A major
- L VI:58 – Violin Capriccio No.10 in A major
- L VI:59 – Violin Capriccio No. 3 in A minor
- L VI:60 – Violin Capriccio No.21 in A minor
- L VI:61 – Violin Capriccio No. 2 in A minor
- L VI:62 – Violin Capriccio No.23 in B♭ major
- L VI:63 – Violin Capriccio No.32 in B♭ major
- L VI:64 – Violin Capriccio No.57 in B♭ major
- L VI:65 – Violin Capriccio No.47 in B♭ major
- L VI:66 – Violin Capriccio No.19 in B♭ minor
- L VI:67 – Violin Capriccio No. 5 in B minor
- L VI:68 – Violin Capriccio in G major
- L VI:69 – Violin Capriccio in G major
- L VI:70 – Violin Capriccio No.59 in C major (lost)
- L VI:71 – Violin Capriccio No.84 in C major (lost)
- L VI:72 – Violin Capriccio No.75 in C major (lost)
- L VI:73 – Violin Capriccio No.68 in C major (lost)
- L VI:74 – Violin Capriccio No.83 in C major (lost)
- L VI:75 – Violin Capriccio No.60 in C major (lost)
- L VI:76 – Violin Capriccio No.55a in D major (lost)
- L VI:77 – Violin Capriccio No.81 in D major (lost)
- L VI:78 – Violin Capriccio No.80 in D major (lost)
- L VI:79 – Violin Capriccio No.74 in D major (lost)
- L VI:80 – Violin Capriccio No.78 in D major (lost)
- L VI:81 – Violin Capriccio No.56 in D major (lost)
- L VI:82 – Violin Capriccio No.66 in D minor (lost)
- L VI:83 – Violin Capriccio No.58 in E♭ major (lost)
- L VI:84 – Violin Capriccio No.67 in E minor (lost)
- L VI:85 – Violin Capriccio No.53 in E minor (lost)
- L VI:86 – Violin Capriccio No.63 in F major (lost)
- L VI:87 – Violin Capriccio No.50 in F minor (lost)
- L VI:88 – Violin Capriccio No.82 in G major (lost)
- L VI:89 – Violin Capriccio No.79 in G major (lost)
- L VI:90 – Violin Capriccio No.73 in G major (lost)
- L VI:91 – Violin Capriccio No.76 in G major (lost)
- L VI:92 – Violin Capriccio No.52 in G minor (lost)
- L VI:93 – Violin Capriccio No.54 in G minor (lost)
- L VI:94 – Violin Capriccio No.44 in A major (lost)
- L VI:95 – Violin Capriccio No.49 in A major (lost)
- L VI:96 – Violin Capriccio No.88 in A major (lost)
- L VI:97 – Violin Capriccio No.43 in A major (lost)
- L VI:98 – Violin Capriccio No.46 in A minor (lost)
- L VI:99 – Violin Capriccio No.55 in B♭ major (lost)
- L VI:100 – Violin Capriccio No.77 in B♭ major (lost)
- L VI:101 – Violin Capriccio No.86 in B♭ major (lost)
- L VI:102 – Violin Capriccio No.87 in B♭ major (lost)
- L VI:103 – Violin Capriccio No.85 in B♭ major (lost)
- L VI:104 – Violin Capriccio No.45 in B minor (lost)
- L VI:105 – Violin Capriccio in D major (lost)
- L VI:106 – Violin Capriccio in E♭ major (lost)
- L VI:107 – Violin Capriccio in A major (lost)
- L VI:108 – Violin Capriccio in A major (lost)
- L VI:109 – Violin Capriccio in B♭ major (lost)
- L VI:110 – Violin Capriccio in B♭ major (lost)

== Miscellaneous works ==
- L VII:1 – Dragonermarsch in D major
- L VII:2 – Piece for mechanical clock in G major
- L VII:3 – 3 Odes
- L deest – Harp Sonata in D major
