= Benda =

Benda may refer to:

== Places and jurisdictions ==
- Benda, Albania, a region, ancient city, former bishopric in Epirus Novus and present Latin Catholic titular see
- Benda, Brebes, a village in Brebes, Central Java, Indonesia
- Benda, Sirampog, a subdistrict of Sirampog, Central Java, Indonesia
- Benda, Tangerang, a subdistrict of Tangerang, Banten, Indonesia
- Benda, Guinea
- Qulbəndə (Gyul'benda, Gülbəndə, Qulbəndə), a village and municipality in the Agdash Rayon, Azerbaijan
- Benda, Santrampur, in Gujarat, India

== Other ==
- Benda (surname), for people including composers of Franz Benda's Czech dynasty
- Benda Chamber Orchestra, a Czech amateur music ensemble, named after that musical family
- 734 Benda, a minor planet
- Prachum Benda or Pchum Ben, ancestors' day in Cambodia
- Staff Benda Bilili, a group of Congolese street musicians living around the zoo in Kinshasa
- "The Prisoner of Benda", an episode of Futurama
