= Christian Benda =

Czech musician

Christian Benda (born 1 July 1959 in Salvador) is a conductor, composer and cellist, descended from the eighteenth-century Benda family of composers. He performs worldwide both as a soloist and a conductor. His numerous recordings include many classical standards such as Mozart, Rossini and Schubert overtures (notably, performances of Boccherini cello sonatas, with his brother accompanying on the fortepiano, for the Naxos label) as well as the compositions of his ancestors Georg Anton (Jiří Antonín) Benda, František Benda and Jan Jiří Benda. (Another ancestor of his was the conductor Hans von Benda, who was particularly active between the 1930s and the 1950s.) He is chief conductor and artistic director of the Prague Sinfonia.

Between 2012 and 2014 he recorded a four-volume cycle of Gioacchino Rossini's complete operatic overtures for Naxos Records with the Prague Sinfonia Orchestra.

He was a Climate Ally in the "Tck Tck Tck: Time for Climate Justice" campaign.
