= Johann Friedrich Ernst Benda =

German musician and composer

Johann Friedrich Ernst Benda (also Ernst Friedrich Johann Benda or Ernst Benda; baptized 10 October 1749 – 24 February 1785) was a German musician and composer of Czech origin.

== Life ==
Johann Friedrich Ernst Benda was the eldest son of the court musician and Kapellmeister Joseph Benda. He was baptized on 10 October 1749 in Berlin. From an early age, he received instruction on piano and violin from hs father, and in 1766 at the age of 19, was employed in the royal Hofkapelle of Frederick the Great in Berlin as Kammermusikus. In 1770, together with the violist Carl Ludwig Bachmann, he founded the so-called Liebhaberkonzerte, which he directed until his death. These performances, which continued until 1797, took place in the Corsicaischen Saale opposite Monbijou Palace (today Oranienburger Straße) and were mostly subscription events with his own orchestra and choir. One notable guest soloist was Johann Friedrich Reichardt, who later married Juliane Benda (d. 1785) and then Minna Brandes (daughter of actor and poet Johann Christian Brandes).

Wilhelm Otto Gottlieb Benda (1775–1832), one of three sons of Johann Friedrich Ernst Benda became Kriminalrat and mayor of Landsut, Silesia (today Kamienna Góra, Poland) and made a name for himself as a translator and writer.

== Works ==
- Minuetto per il Cembalo con Variazioni in F major, 1768 listed in Breitkopf
- Concerto in G major for violin, strings and continuo (listed in MGG)

== See also ==
- Benda (surname)

== Bibliography ==
- Ernst Ludwig Gerber: Historisch-Biographisches Lexicon der Tonkünstler. Leipzig 1790, Page 130.
- Robert Eitner: Biographisch-bibliographisches Quellen-Lexikon der Musiker und Musikgelehrten der christlichen Zeitrechnung bis zur Mitte des neunzehnten Jahrhunderts. Band 1, Breitkopf & Härtel, Leipzig 1900, page 432.
- Musikalisches conversations-lexikon. L. Heimann 1870, page 406.
- Carl Freiherrn von Ledebur: Tonkünstler-Lexicon Berlin's von den ältesten Zeiten bis auf die Gegenwart. 1861, page 38
- Franz Lorenz: Die Musikerfamilie Benda. Band 1: Franz Benda. Wilhelm de Gruyter, Berlin 1967, pages 74–76.
- Die Musik in Geschichte und Gegenwart (MGG), Zweite, neubearbeitete Ausgabe, edited by Ludwig Finscher Personenteil 2, Bag–Bi, Bärenreiter, Kassel 1999, Spalte 1072.
- Marion Fürst: Maria Theresia Paradis: Mozarts berühmte Zeitgenossin. Band 4, Böhlau Verlag, Köln Weimar 2005, ISBN 3-412-19505-7, ISBN 978-3-412-19505-2, page 134.
- Hans Erich Bödeker e. a.: Le concert et son public: mutations de la vie musicale en Europe de 1780 à 1914 (France, Allemagne, Angleterre). Verlag Les Editions de la MSH, 2002, ISBN 2735109143, page 168.
- Arrey von Dommer (1875). "Benda". Allgemeine Deutsche Biographie (in German). Vol. 2. Leipzig: Duncker & Humblot. pp. 314–318. (Familienartikel)
- Werner Bollert (1955). "Benda, Franz". Neue Deutsche Biographie (in German). Vol. 2. Berlin: Duncker & Humblot. p. 35. (full text online).
