= Psalm 97 =

97th psalm of the book of Psalms

- "The Lord is King"
- Hymn psalm
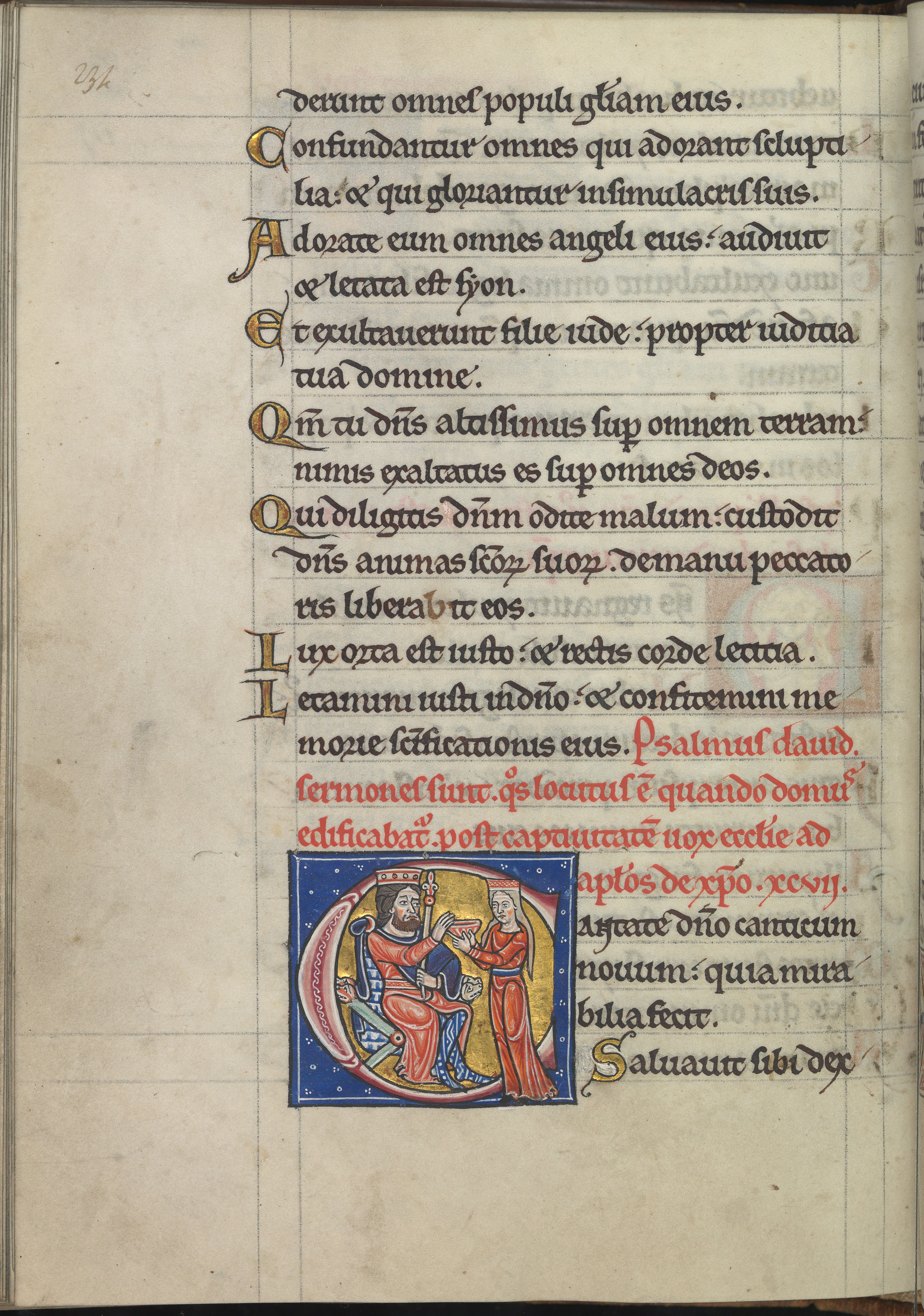
- Psalm 97 in the Psalter of Eleanor of Aquitaine (ca. 1185)
- Other name: Psalm 96 (Vulgate); "Dominus regnavit exultet terra"
- Language: Hebrew (original)

Psalm 97
- ← Psalm 96 Psalm 98 →
- Book: Book of Psalms
- Hebrew Bible part: Ketuvim
- Order in the Hebrew part: 1
- Category: Sifrei Emet
- Christian Bible part: Old Testament
- Order in the Christian part: 19

Psalm 97 is the 97th psalm of the Book of Psalms, beginning in the English of the King James Version: "The Lord reigneth; let the earth rejoice", also as "The Lord is King". The Book of Psalms is part of the third section of the Hebrew Bible, and a book of the Christian Old Testament. In Latin, it is known as "Dominus regnavit exultet terra". The psalm is a hymn psalm; the Jerusalem Bible calls it an "eschatological hymn".

The slightly different numbering system in the Greek Septuagint version of the Hebrew Bible and the Latin Vulgate version of the Bible makes this psalm Psalm 96.

The psalm forms a regular part of Jewish and Catholic, Lutheran, Anglican, and other Christian liturgies. It has often been set to music, notably by Otto Nicolai as a German motet, and by Antonín Dvořák, who set it in Czech in his Biblical Songs.

== Textual witnesses ==
Some early manuscripts containing the text of this chapter in Hebrew are of the Masoretic Text tradition, which includes the Aleppo Codex (10th century), and Codex Leningradensis (1008).

The extant palimpsest Aq^{Taylor} includes a translation into Koine Greek by Aquila of Sinope in c. 130 CE, containing verses 1–12.

== Themes ==
Psalm 97 foreshadows the messianic era when God will reign supreme over the earth. Its verses reference God's sovereignty, his enactment of justice, and the widespread rejoicing that will ensue.

== Uses ==
=== New Testament ===
In the Letter to the Hebrews in the New Testament, Hebrews 1:5–13 relates a number of scriptural proofs that "the Son is greater than the angels", including at verse 6, And let all the angels of God worship him. The Masoretic Text version of Psalm 97:7 reads worship him, all ye gods but the Septuagint equivalent reads "προσκυνήσατε αὐτῷ πάντες οἱ ἄγγελοι αὐτοῦ", worship him, all ye his angels. Biblical commentator A. F. Kirkpatrick suggests that the Hebrews quotation may have come from Psalm 97:7 or alternatively from the Septuagint expansion of Deuteronomy 32:43.

=== Judaism ===
Psalm 97 is the third of six psalms recited during the Kabbalat Shabbat (Welcoming the Shabbat) service in Ashkenazic, Hasidic and some Sephardic communities.. These six psalms represent the six days of the week, with Psalm 97 corresponding to the third day (Tuesday).

Verse 11 of the psalm, "Light is sown for the righteous...", is recited by Eastern Ashkenazi Jews at the start of the Kol Nidre service on Yom Kippur.

Verse 11 is also one of the verses which the Shulchan Aruch (Code of Jewish Law) advises a person to say if he is having trouble falling asleep.

=== Coptic Orthodox Church ===
In the Agpeya, the Coptic Church's book of hours, this psalm is prayed in the office of None. It is also in the prayer of the Veil, which is generally prayed only by monks.

== Musical settings ==
Heinrich Schütz set the psalm in German as part of his setting of the Becker Psalter, which he published in 1628. Titled "Der Herr ist König überall" (The lord is King everywhere), it is catalogued as SWV 195. Henry Desmarest composed one grand motet "Dominus regnant" (unknown date). Jean-Joseph Cassanéa de Mondonville composed one grand motet "Dominus regnavit" in 1734. Johann Sebastian Bach based the first movement of a wedding cantata, Dem Gerechten muß das Licht, BWV 195, on Psalms 97:11–12 in possibly in 1727. Friedrich Ludwig Benda set the psalm in German as a cantata for three soloists, choir and orchestra in 1786. Otto Nicolai set Psalm 97 in German as a psalm motet for choir a cappella with solo passages, "Der Herr ist König" (The Lord is King) in 1832, published by Bote & Bock in Berlin in 1977. Antonín Dvořák set verses 2–6 in Czech to music in No. 1 of his Biblical Songs, Op. 99, in 1894.

Works for Anglican services include a setting by Joseph Barnby, The Lord is King.

== Text ==
The following table shows the Hebrew text of the Psalm with vowels, alongside the Koine Greek text in the Septuagint and the English translation from the King James Version. Note that the meaning can slightly differ between these versions, as the Septuagint and the Masoretic Text come from different textual traditions. (Note: A 1917 translation directly from Hebrew to English by the Jewish Publication Society can be found here or here, and an 1844 translation directly from the Septuagint by L. C. L. Brenton can be found here. Both translations are in the public domain.) In the Septuagint, this psalm is numbered Psalm 96.

#	Hebrew	English	Greek
1	יְהֹוָ֣ה מָ֭לָךְ תָּגֵ֣ל הָאָ֑רֶץ יִ֝שְׂמְח֗וּ אִיִּ֥ים רַבִּֽים׃	The Lord reigneth; let the earth rejoice; let the multitude of isles be glad thereof.	Τῷ Δαυΐδ, ὅτε ἡ γῆ αὐτοῦ καθίσταται. - Ο ΚΥΡΙΟΣ ἐβασίλευσεν, ἀγαλλιάσθω ἡ γῆ, εὐφρανθήτωσαν νῆσοι πολλαί.
2	עָנָ֣ן וַעֲרָפֶ֣ל סְבִיבָ֑יו צֶ֥דֶק וּ֝מִשְׁפָּ֗ט מְכ֣וֹן כִּסְאֽוֹ׃	Clouds and darkness are round about him: righteousness and judgment are the habitation of his throne.	νέφη καὶ γνόφος κύκλῳ αὐτοῦ, δικαιοσύνη καὶ κρίμα κατόρθωσις τοῦ θρόνου αὐτοῦ.
3	אֵ֭שׁ לְפָנָ֣יו תֵּלֵ֑ךְ וּתְלַהֵ֖ט סָבִ֣יב צָרָֽיו׃	A fire goeth before him, and burneth up his enemies round about.	πῦρ ἐναντίον αὐτοῦ προπορεύσεται καὶ φλογιεῖ κύκλῳ τοὺς ἐχθροὺς αὐτοῦ·
4	הֵאִ֣ירוּ בְרָקָ֣יו תֵּבֵ֑ל רָאֲתָ֖ה וַתָּחֵ֣ל הָאָֽרֶץ׃	His lightnings enlightened the world: the earth saw, and trembled.	ἔφαναν αἱ ἀστραπαὶ αὐτοῦ τῇ οἰκουμένῃ, εἶδε καὶ ἐσαλεύθη ἡ γῆ.
5	הָרִ֗ים כַּדּוֹנַ֗ג נָ֭מַסּוּ מִלִּפְנֵ֣י יְהֹוָ֑ה מִ֝לִּפְנֵ֗י אֲד֣וֹן כׇּל־הָאָֽרֶץ׃	The hills melted like wax at the presence of the Lord, at the presence of the Lord of the whole earth.	τὰ ὄρη ὡσεὶ κηρὸς ἐτάκησαν ἀπὸ προσώπου Κυρίου, ἀπὸ προσώπου Κυρίου πάσης τῆς γῆς.
6	הִגִּ֣ידוּ הַשָּׁמַ֣יִם צִדְק֑וֹ וְרָא֖וּ כׇל־הָעַמִּ֣ים כְּבוֹדֽוֹ׃	The heavens declare his righteousness, and all the people see his glory.	ἀνήγγειλαν οἱ οὐρανοὶ τὴν δικαιοσύνην αὐτοῦ, καὶ εἴδοσαν πάντες οἱ λαοὶ τὴν δόξαν αὐτοῦ.
7	יֵבֹ֤שׁוּ ׀ כׇּל־עֹ֬בְדֵי פֶ֗סֶל הַמִּֽתְהַלְלִ֥ים בָּאֱלִילִ֑ים הִשְׁתַּחֲווּ־ל֝֗וֹ כׇּל־אֱלֹהִֽים׃	Confounded be all they that serve graven images, that boast themselves of idols: worship him, all ye gods.	αἰσχυνθήτωσαν πάντες οἱ προσκυνοῦντες τοῖς γλυπτοῖς, οἱ ἐγκαυχώμενοι ἐν τοῖς εἰδώλοις αὐτῶν· προσκυνήσατε αὐτῷ, πάντες οἱ ἄγγελοι αὐτοῦ.
8	שָׁמְעָ֬ה וַתִּשְׂמַ֨ח ׀ צִיּ֗וֹן וַ֭תָּגֵלְנָה בְּנ֣וֹת יְהוּדָ֑ה לְמַ֖עַן מִשְׁפָּטֶ֣יךָ יְהֹוָֽה׃	Zion heard, and was glad; and the daughters of Judah rejoiced because of thy judgments, O Lord.	ἤκουσε καὶ εὐφράνθη ἡ Σιών, καὶ ἠγαλλιάσαντο αἱ θυγατέρες τῆς ᾿Ιουδαίας ἕνεκεν τῶν κριμάτων σου, Κύριε·
9	כִּֽי־אַתָּ֤ה יְהֹוָ֗ה עֶלְי֥וֹן עַל־כׇּל־הָאָ֑רֶץ מְאֹ֥ד נַ֝עֲלֵ֗יתָ עַל־כׇּל־אֱלֹהִֽים׃	For thou, LORD, art high above all the earth: thou art exalted far above all gods.	ὅτι σὺ εἶ Κύριος ὕψιστος ἐπὶ πᾶσαν τὴν γῆν, σφόδρα ὑπερυψώθης ὑπὲρ πάντας τοὺς θεούς.
10	אֹֽהֲבֵ֥י יְהֹוָ֗ה שִׂנְא֫וּ־רָ֥ע שֹׁ֭מֵר נַפְשׁ֣וֹת חֲסִידָ֑יו מִיַּ֥ד רְ֝שָׁעִ֗ים יַצִּילֵֽם׃	Ye that love the LORD, hate evil: he preserveth the souls of his saints; he delivereth them out of the hand of the wicked.	οἱ ἀγαπῶντες τὸν Κύριον, μισεῖτε πονηρά· φυλάσσει Κύριος τὰς ψυχὰς τῶν ὁσίων αὐτοῦ, ἐκ χειρὸς ἁμαρτωλῶν ῥύσεται αὐτούς.
11	א֭וֹר זָרֻ֣עַ לַצַּדִּ֑יק וּֽלְיִשְׁרֵי־לֵ֥ב שִׂמְחָֽה׃	Light is sown for the righteous, and gladness for the upright in heart.	φῶς ἀνέτειλε τῷ δικαίῳ καὶ τοῖς εὐθέσι τῇ καρδίᾳ εὐφροσύνη.
12	שִׂמְח֣וּ צַ֭דִּיקִים בַּיהֹוָ֑ה וְ֝הוֹד֗וּ לְזֵ֣כֶר קׇדְשֽׁוֹ׃	Rejoice in the Lord, ye righteous; and give thanks at the remembrance of his holiness.	εὐφράνθητε, δίκαιοι, ἐν τῷ Κυρίῳ, καὶ ἐξομολογεῖσθε τῇ μνήμῃ τῆς ἁγιωσύνης αὐτοῦ.

=== Verse 8 ===
Zion hears and is glad,
And the daughters of Judah rejoice.

'Zion' means Jerusalem, the 'daughters of Judah' the other towns in Judah.
