= Joseph Benda =

Czech violinist and composer (1724–1804)

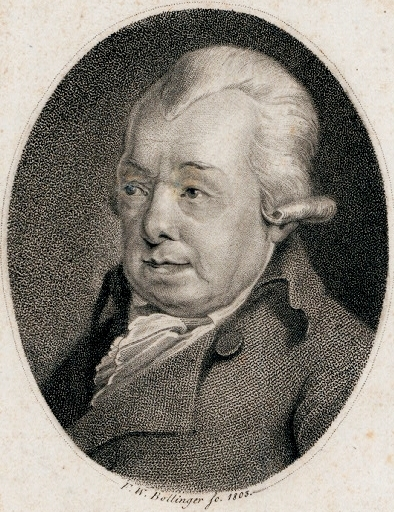
Joseph Benda

Joseph Benda (Czech: Josef Benda; c. 7 May 1724 – 22 February 1804) was a Czech violinist and composer active in the Kingdom of Prussia.

== Life ==
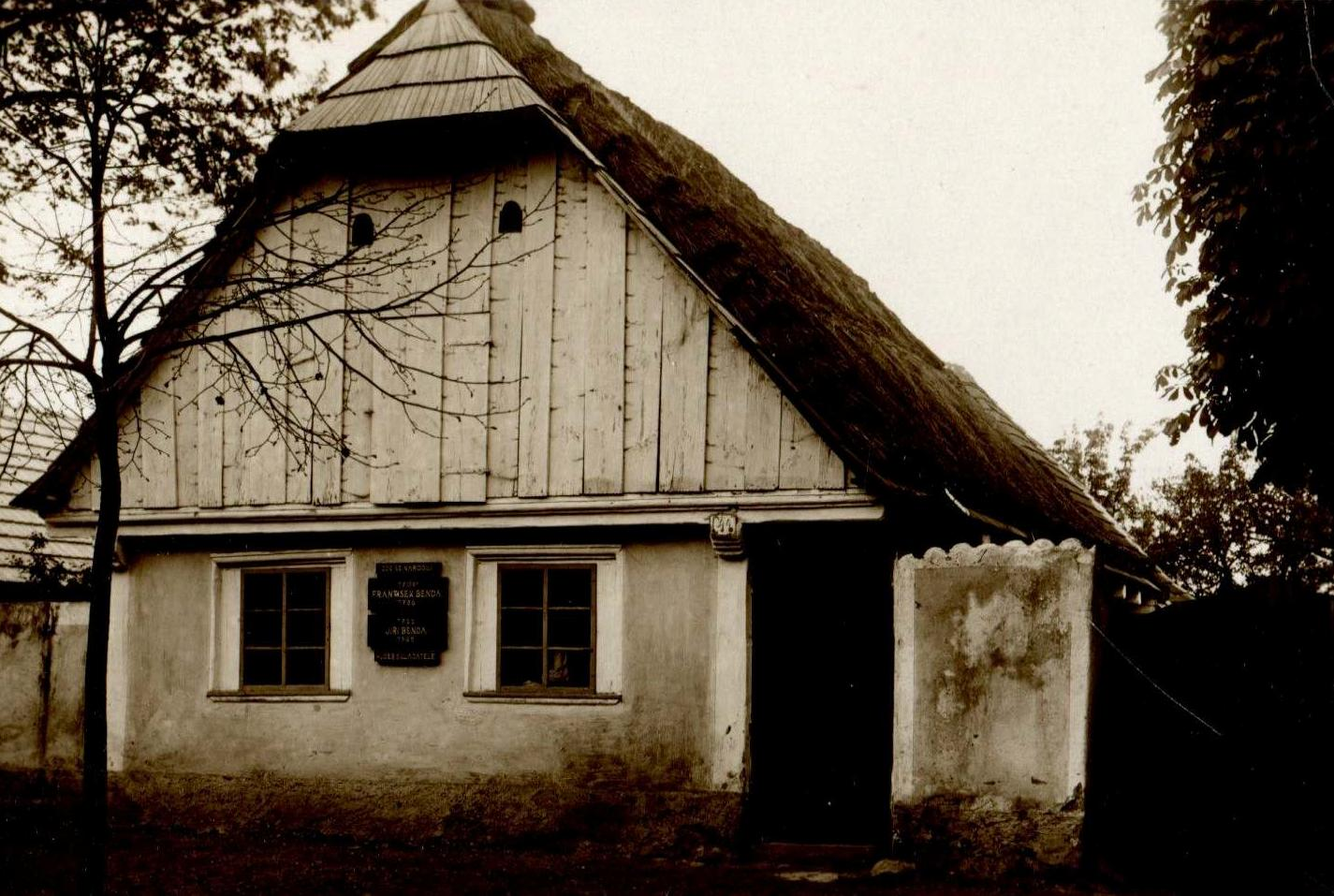
Benda family house in Benátky nad Jizerou, built 1706–1707, demolished 1936

Joseph Benda was baptised on 7 May 1724. He was born in Benátky nad Jizerou, the son of a weaver Jan Jiří Benda and his wife Dorota Brixi, daughter of the village cantor from Skalsko and member of the large Czech musical family. Five of Joseph's siblings achieved success as musicians; older brothers František, Jan Jiří and Jiří Antonín as violinist composers, and younger sister Anna Franziska as an operatic soprano.

In 1742, during the First Silesian War, Joseph was presented before Frederick II of Prussia, who was stationed at his winter quarters at Schloss Lissa. Upon hearing the 18-year-old Joseph, the King immediately sent him to Potsdam where he was to finalise his training as a violinist with his brother František, who was already a violinist in Frederick's Hofkapelle along with Jan Jiří. Benda's remaining family in Benátky nad Jizerou were also invited by Frederick to take up residence in Potsdam. Joseph's parents, along with their children Jan Jiří, Anna Franziska and Viktor settled in the Bohemian quarter of Potsdam called Nowawes (now Babelsberg) where his father and brother Viktor opened a weaving mill. Later that year, Joseph had already achieved a position in Frederick's Hofkapelle.

The English music journalist Charles Burney recorded two meetings with Joseph Benda in 1775. On the first occasion, on 29 September, Joseph performed a "pleasing solo, composed by his brother, which he executed with great neatness and delicacy". With the ailing health of his older brother František, Joseph became his amanuensis and assistant concert master. He succeeded his brother as concert master after his death in 1786.

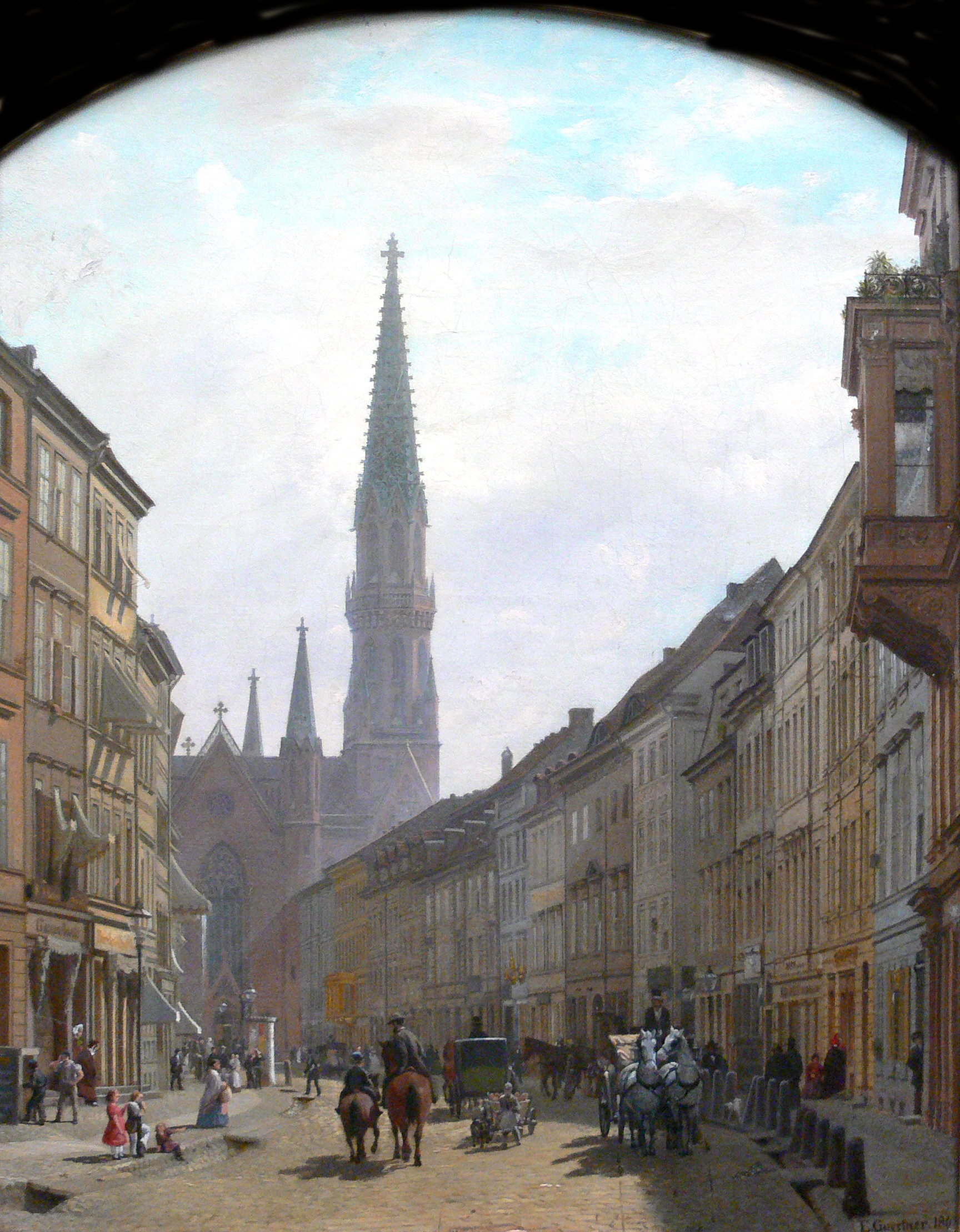
Cölln: Brüderstraße and Petrikirche in the 19th century, by Eduard Gaertner

Joseph was active into old age, participating in the so-called Liebhaberkonzerte founded by his son. He also organised a performance on 22 December 1793 as part of the extensive celebrations upon the arrival of Crown Princess Luise in the Corsicaischen Saale, opposite Monbijou Palace. He remained concertmaster following the accession of King Frederick William II of Prussia in 1786 but was placed into retirement by the following king, Frederick William III of Prussia in 1798 with a pension of 800 Thaler. He lived with his family at Brüderstraße 19 (cnr Breiterstraße) and his death was recorded in the church records of the nearby Petrikirche. Upon his death in 1804, he was succeeded by his nephew (the son of Franz), Karl Hermann Heinrich. He died on 22 February 1804 in Berlin.

Joseph's two sons, Johann Friedrich Ernst Benda (1749–1785) and Carl Friedrich Franz Benda (1754–1816), were both violinists in the Hofkapelle.

== Works ==
There are only two surviving works by Joseph Benda. It seems likely that many pieces have been lost or misattributed to other members of the Benda family.

- Sonata in A major for violin and continuo
- Cappricio in E major for solo violin
- Sonata per il Cembalo (lost?; manuscript previously in Dresden)
- 12 Caprices for solo violin in Etudes pour le Violon ou Caprices Oeuvre posthume de François & Joseph Benda Maitres de Concert du Roi de Prusse (Livre II)
