= Benda Chamber Orchestra =

Benda Chamber Orchestra is a Czech amateur music ensemble in Ústí nad Labem, Czech Republic. It is named after the renowned Czech family of musicians and composers of the 18th century - the Bendas (František Benda or Franz Benda, Jiří Antnonín Benda or Georg Anton Benda).

== History ==
The orchestra was founded in 1956 in Ústí nad Labem, Czechoslovakia. It focuses on performing (often unknown) pieces of Czech classical and baroque music.

Benda Chamber Orchestra co-operates with outstanding professional musicians. Currently it is led by Jiri Havlik, a member of the Czech Philharmonic.

== Discography ==
- Benda: Sinfonias Nos 7-12 (1995)
