= Felix Benda =

Czech composer and organist (1708–1768)

Felix Benda (25 February 1708 – 1768) was a Czech composer and organist. He was not a member of the Benda musical family.

Benda was born in Skalsko, Bohemia. He was a student of Bohuslav Matěj Černohorský. In 1726, he became an organist at the Michaelskirche in Prague (succeeding Šimon Brixi). His works, not published during his lifetime, demonstrate his profound knowledge in counterpoint. They include a requiem mass, organ masses, two oratorios, and other church music.

Benda's students included Josef Mysliveček and Josef Seger.

He died in Prague in 1768.
