= Jablonec nad Nisou =

- Statutory city
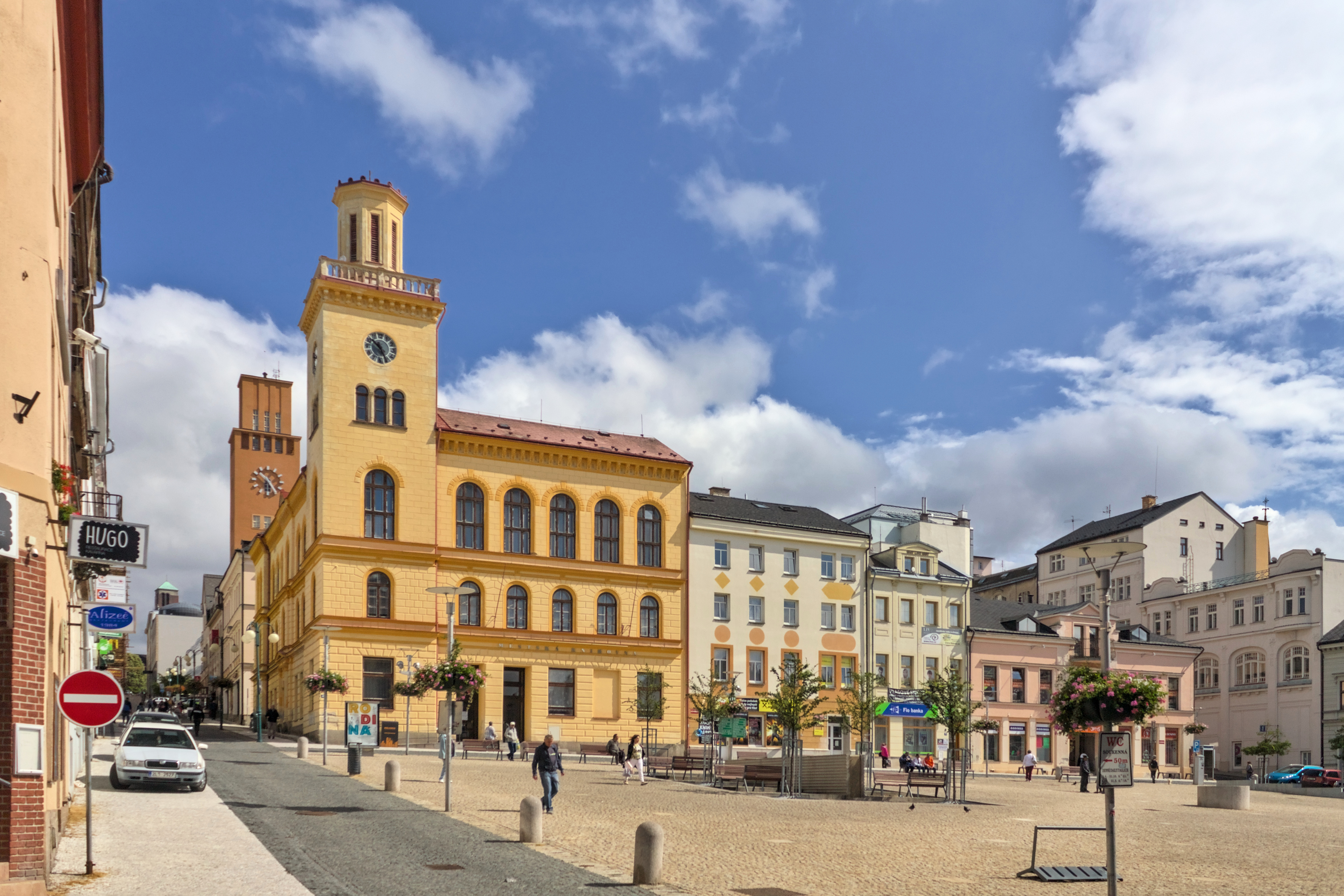
- The square Dolní náměstí

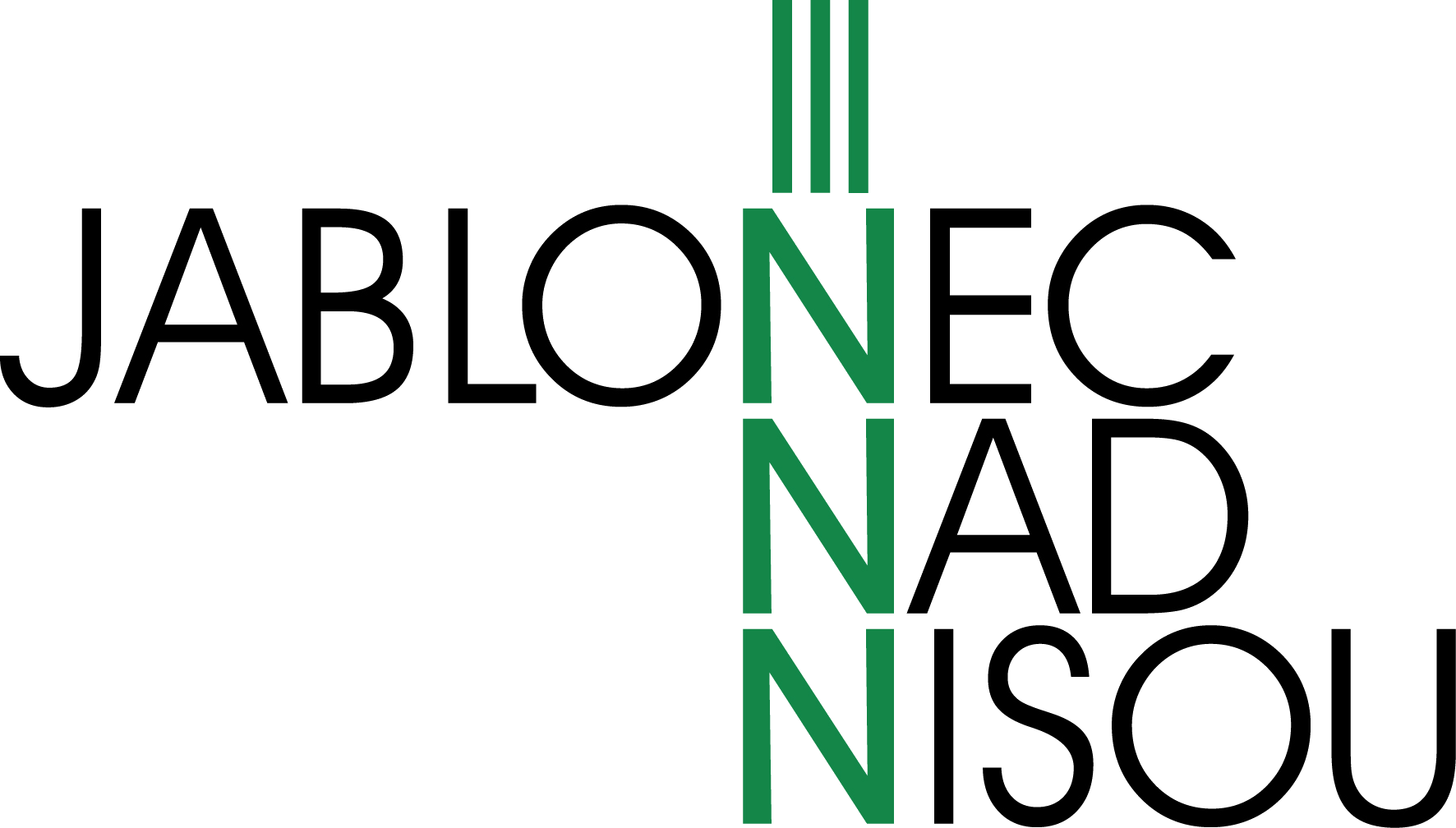
- Flag Coat of arms Wordmark

- Location in the Czech Republic
- Coordinates: 50°43′28″N 15°10′5″E
- Country: Czech Republic
- Region: Liberec
- District: Jablonec nad Nisou
- First mentioned: 1356

Government
  - Mayor: Miloš Vele (ODS)

Area
  - Total: 31.38 km^{2} (12.12 sq mi)
- Elevation: 475 m (1,558 ft)

Population (2026-01-01)
  - Total: 46,206
  - Density: 1,472/km^{2} (3,814/sq mi)
- Time zone: UTC+1 (CET)
  - Summer (DST): UTC+2 (CEST)
- Postal code: 466 01
- Website: www.mestojablonec.cz

Jablonec nad Nisou (Czech pronunciation: [ˈjablonɛts ˈnad ɲɪsou]; German: Gablonz an der Neiße) is a city in the Liberec Region of the Czech Republic. It has about 46,000 inhabitants. It is the second-largest city in the region and forms a conurbation with the neighbouring city of Liberec. The city is located on the Lusatian Neisse River, in a basin surrounded by the Jizera Mountains.

Jablonec nad Nisou was founded in the 14th century, but it only became a town in 1866. From the 18th century, it is known for its glass and costume jewelry production, especially for bijou. The historic town centre is well preserved and is protected as an urban monument zone. The most architecturally valuable building is the New Town Hall, protected as a national cultural monument.

== Administrative division ==
Jablonec nad Nisou consists of eight municipal parts (in brackets population according to the 2021 census):

- Jablonec nad Nisou (25,274)
- Jablonecké Paseky (2,550)
- Kokonín (1,985)
- Lukášov (272)
- Mšeno nad Nisou (8,428)
- Proseč nad Nisou (2,056)
- Rýnovice (2,540)
- Vrkoslavice (1,381)

== Etymology ==
The name Jablonec is of Czech origin and means 'little apple tree' (jablonče was a diminutive of the old Czech word jabloň – 'apple tree'), for the village was founded on a place where an apple tree grew. German-speaking settlers who came to the village during the 16th century adjusted the name to Gablonz. During the 19th century, the prefix "German" was often added to the name (like in the 1848 Jablonec německý, German: Deutsch-Gablonz). In 1904, the official suffix in both Czech and German became 'on the Neisse', which described the location of the city upon the Lusatian Neisse River.

== Geography ==
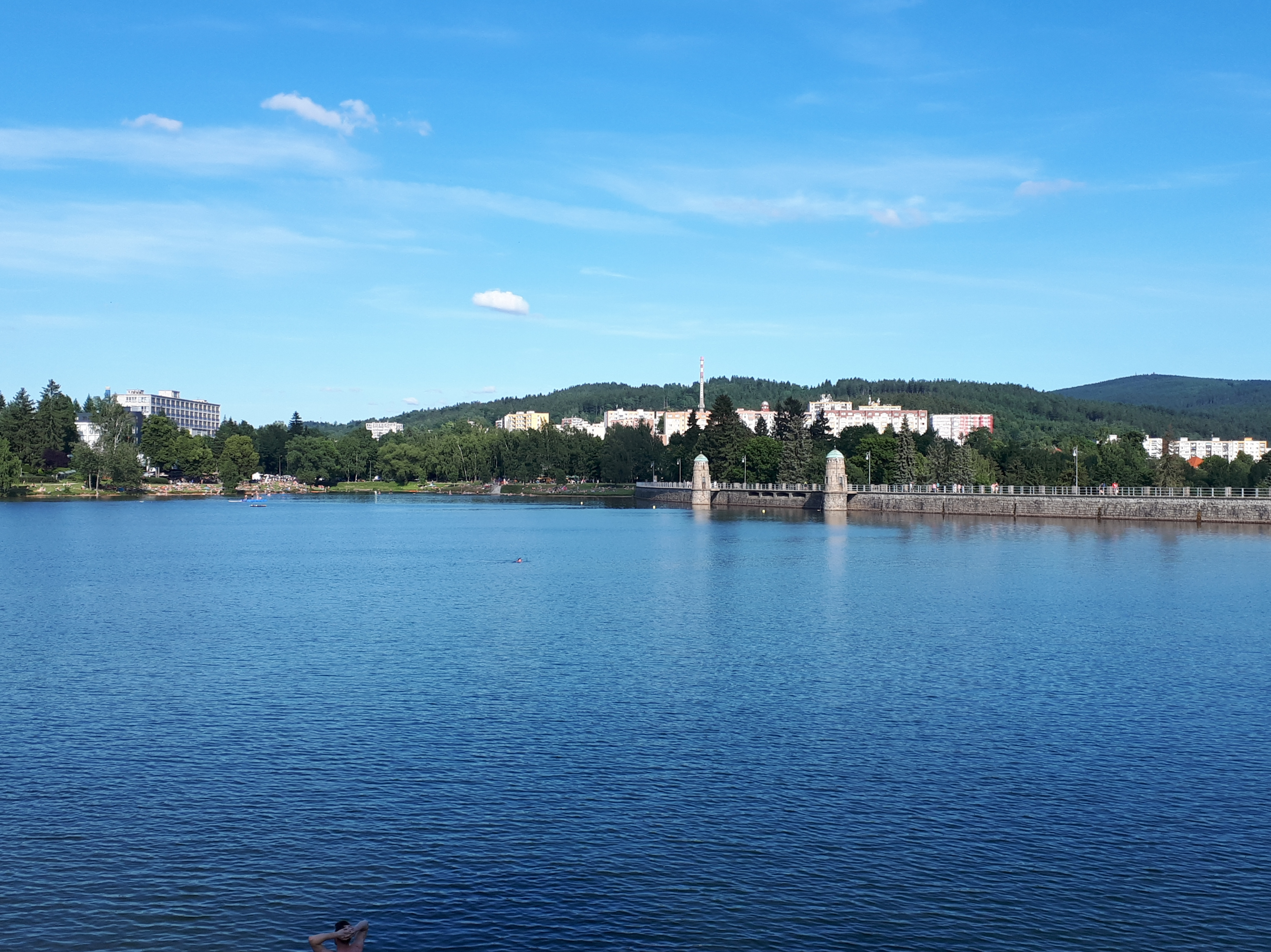
Jablonec nad Nisou as viewed across the Mšeno Reservoir

Jablonec nad Nisou is located about 7 kilometres (4 mi) southeast of Liberec and 83 km (52 mi) northeast of Prague. Most of the built-up area lies in the eastern tip of the Zittau Basin and is surrounded with the Jizera Mountains in the north, east and south. The northern part of the municipal territory also belongs into the Jizera Mountains Protected Landscape Area. The highest point of Jablonec nad Nisou is located on the slopes in the southeastern part of the territory, with an altitude of 758 m (2,487 ft).

Jablonec nad Nisou is situated at the confluence of the rivers Lusatian Neisse and Bílá Nisa. The Mohelka River originates in Jablonec nad Nisou-Kokonín. The Mšeno Reservoir in the city belongs to the largest inner city areas in Europe. It was built in 1906–1909 and has an area of around 42 ha (100 acres).

== History ==
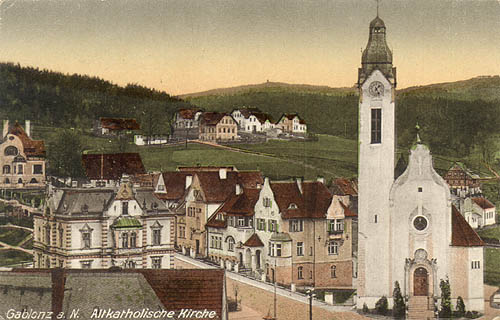
Old Catholic parish church

The first written mention of Jablonec was in a Latin document from 1356 as Jablonecz. According to this document, Jablonec was founded in the 14th century. In August 1469, the village was burned to the ground by troops of rebelling Lusatians in the war between them and King George of Poděbrady. The village was then resettled in the 1530s and 1540s by mostly German-speaking colonists.

In the first half of the 17th century, Jablonec was owned by Albrecht von Wallenstein, who sold it to the Desfours family. In 1643, during the Thirty Years' War, Jablonec was burned down for the second time. Glass production began to flourish in the second half of the 17th century and Jablonec began to develop rapidly. In the 18th century, the first bijou was produced and the first exporter, J. F. Schwann, spread the villages's name throughout Europe. Jablonec was promoted to a market town by Emperor Francis II on 21 April 1808.

Further development followed the construction of the road in the 1840s. Jablonec was then promoted to a town by Emperor Franz Joseph I on 28 March 1866. Franco-Prussian War in 1870–1871 damaged competitors in the production of glass and jewelry, and the Jablonec traders seized the foreign markets. A steady supply of a wide range of glass and artificial jewellery products flowed out of the town. This industrial advancement also improved the quality of life, and Jablonec's appearance changed dramatically.

Historian Peter Hinks, writing about the various types of Late Victorian jewellery sold by British and American companies at the turn of the 20th century, noted that "The Bohemian garnet jewellery sold by Moore and Evans [in Chicago] was the product of an industry based in the town of Gablonz, now Jablonec. These very effective jewels were set with locally mined garnets, rose cut and set in gold mounts of very formal design."

However, the worldwide economic crisis resulting from the Wall Street crash of 1929 damaged the glass and jewellery industry and the crisis of the 1930s began. Changing trends and the growth of foreign competition also hurt the local industry. In October 1938, Jablonec was annexed to Nazi Germany after the Munich Agreement, and was administered as a part of Reichsgau Sudetenland until 1945.

Between 1945 and 1949, most of the Germans were expelled under the terms of Beneš decrees. After the war, some of the expelled German-speaking citizens of Jablonec founded a new settlement in Bavaria and called in remembrance of their hometown Neugablonz ('new Jablonec'). Today, it is one of the districts of the city of Kaufbeuren.

== Demographics ==
Historical population

Year	Pop.	±%
1869	12,785	—
1880	15,644	+22.4%
1890	22,911	+46.5%
1900	32,087	+40.1%
1910	43,331	+35.0%

Year	Pop.	±%
1921	39,147	−9.7%
1930	50,203	+28.2%
1950	32,749	−34.8%
1961	36,116	+10.3%
1970	36,679	+1.6%

Year	Pop.	±%
1980	42,179	+15.0%
1991	45,937	+8.9%
2001	45,266	−1.5%
2011	44,567	−1.5%
2021	44,486	−0.2%

Source: Censuses

== Economy ==
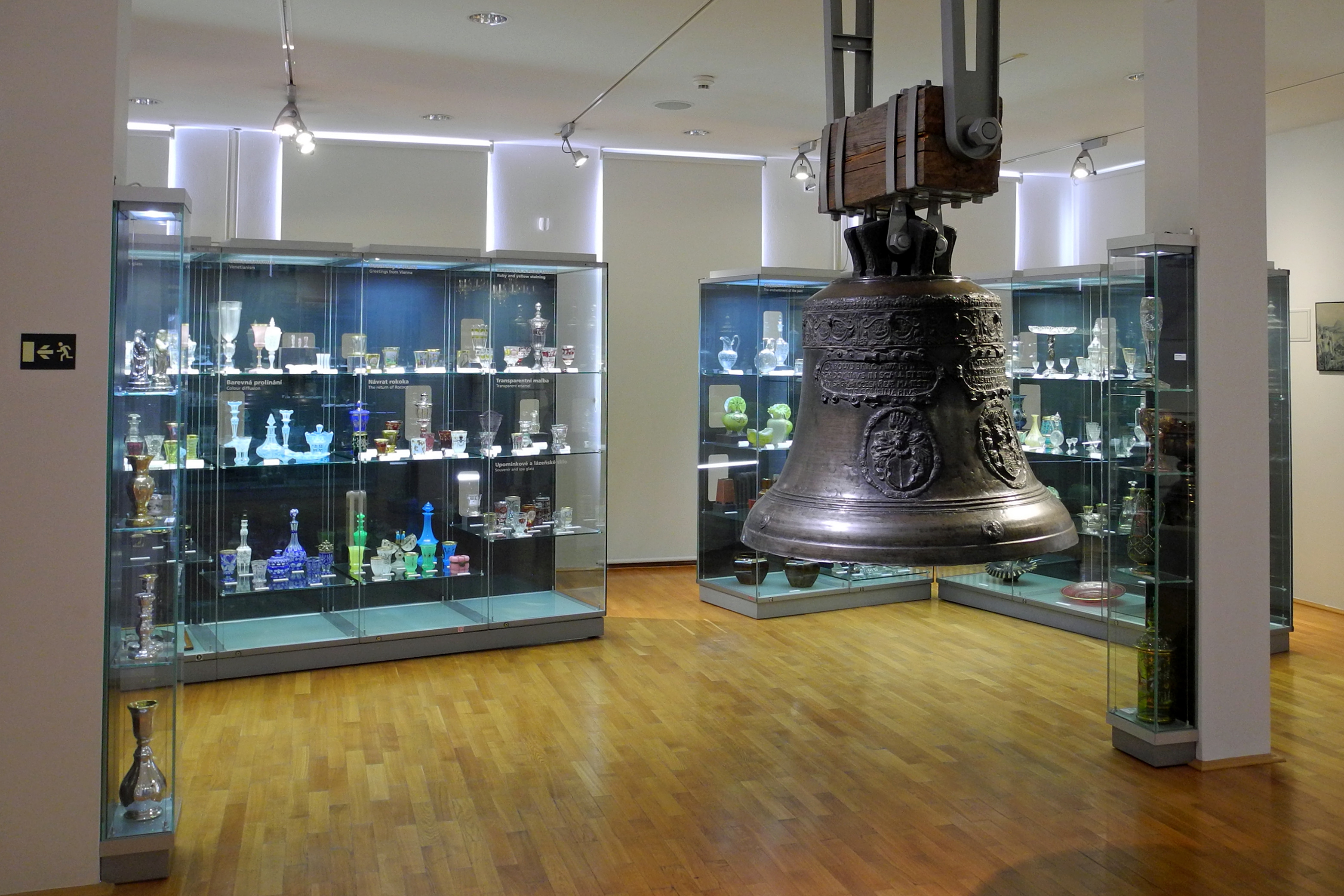
Museum of Glass and Costume Jewelry in Jablonec nad Nisou

Jablonec nad Nisou holds the Czech Mint after Czechoslovakia split into the Czech Republic and Slovakia (the Czechoslovak mint, also known as the Kremnica Mint, is now in Slovakia).

The city has a long tradition of costume jewelry and beads production.

The biggest industrial employers with headquarters in the city are Preciosa (glass products manufacturer) and TI Automotive AC (production of car air conditioners).

The city is also home to Jablotron, a developer and manufacturer of electronic security systems founded in 1990.

The Liberec-Jablonec agglomeration was defined as a tool for drawing money from the European Structural and Investment Funds. It is an area that includes the cities of Liberec and Jablonec nad Nisou and their surroundings, linked to the cities by commuting and migration. It has about 227,000 inhabitants.

== Transport ==
Jablonec nad Nisou shares the tramway line that connects it to the neighbouring city of Liberec.

The city is located on the railway line from Liberec to Szklarska Poręba in Poland. The city's territory is served by six train stations and stops: Jablonec nad Nisou, Jablonec nad Nisou centrum, Jablonec nad Nisou zastávka, Jablonec nad Nisou dolní nádraží, Nová Ves nad Nisou and Jablonecké Paseky.

== Sport ==
Jablonec has a swimming pool, three football and athletic stadiums, and an ice hockey arena.

The city is represented by FK Jablonec in the Czech First League. The club has been a stable member of the league since 1994.

Before the World War II, a number of ethnic German football clubs existed in Gablonz, Fortuna, DSK and BSK. These were merged into NSTG Gablonz in 1939 by the Nazis, NSTG standing for Nationalsozialistische Turngemeinde. NSTG played in the Gauliga Sudetenland but disappeared with the end of the war. BSK however was reformed in 1950 in Bavaria, under the name of BSK Neugablonz.

== Sights ==
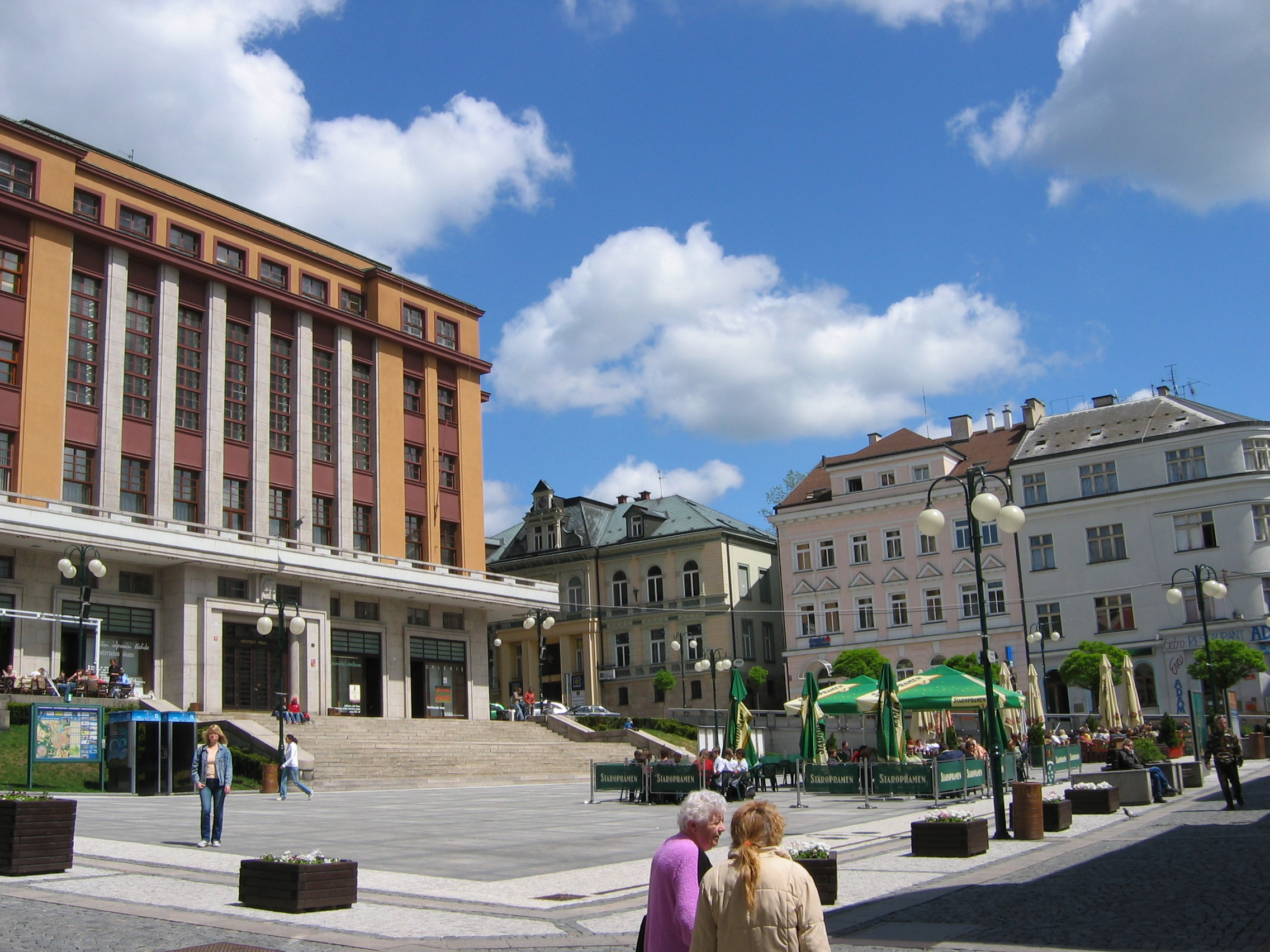
Mírové náměstí with the New Town Hall (left)

The historical city centre is formed by squares Dolní náměstí, Mírové náměstí, Horní náměstí, and Anenské náměstí, which lies close to each other, and their surroundings. The Old Town Hall with a typical square tower was built on Dolní náměstí in 1867–1869. Today it serves as a library.

The current city hall (called New Town Hall), is located on Mírové náměstí. Built in the functionalist style in 1930–1933, it is an excellent example of interwar modern architecture and has been protected as a national cultural monument since 2024.

There are several churches in the city: Church of Saint Anne (built in the Baroque style in 1865–1867), Church of the Most Sacred Heart of Jesus (a brick building, built in 1930–1931), Church of the Exaltation of the Holy Cross (built in the Art Nouveau style in 1900–1902; one of the most important sacral Art Nouveau buildings in Europe), and Protestant Dr. Farský Church (a pseudo-Gothic building from 1892).

The tradition of costume jewellery production is presented in the Museum of Glass and Costume Jewellery. It was founded in 1904 and it is located in an Art Nouveau building.

== Notable people ==
- Adolf Benda (1845–1878), historian
- Gustav Leutelt (1860–1947), writer and poet
- Reinhold Hanisch (1882–1937), Austrian businessman and painter
- Konrad Henlein (1898–1945), Nazi politician
- Peter Herman Adler (1899–1990), conductor
- Ute de Lange Nilsen (1931–2024), Czech-Norwegian artist
- Jiří Moskal (born 1949), rally raid driver
- Ivan Bartoš (born 1980), politician
- Jakub Čutta (born 1981), ice hockey player
- Barbora Špotáková (born 1981), javelin thrower
- Radka Vodičková (born 1984), triathlete
- Daniel Špaček (born 1986), ice hockey player
- Gabriela Koukalová (born 1989), biathlete
- Jessica Jislová (born 1994), biathlete
- Markéta Davidová (born 1997), biathlete

== Twin towns – sister cities ==
Jablonec nad Nisou is twinned with:

- Bautzen, Germany
- Beihai, China
- Jelenia Góra, Poland
- Kaufbeuren, Germany
- Marsciano, Italy
- Ronse, Belgium
- Zwickau, Germany
