= Joseph Barnby =

English composer and conductor (1838–1896)

Sir Joseph Barnby
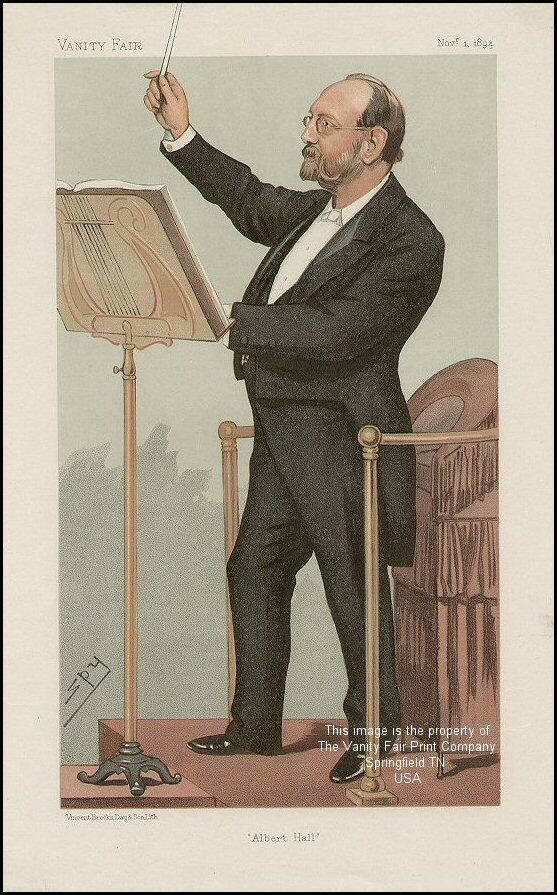
- Sir Joseph Barnby, caricature by "Spy"
- Born: 12 August 1838; York, England
- Died: 28 January 1896 (aged 57)
- Occupations: English composer and conductor

Sir Joseph Barnby (12 August 1838 – 28 January 1896) was an English composer and conductor.

== Life ==
Barnby was born at York, as a son of Thomas Barnby, who was an organist. Joseph was a chorister at York Minster from the age of seven. His voice broke at the age of fifteen and he studied for two to three years at the Royal Academy of Music under Cipriani Potter and Charles Lucas. He was narrowly beaten by Arthur Sullivan in competition for the Mendelssohn Scholarship. In 1862 he was appointed organist of St Andrew's, Wells Street, London, where he raised the services to a high degree of excellence. It was at St Andrew's that in 1864, Barnby and the choir performed two anthems by Alice Mary Smith; this is believed to be the first time that liturgical music composed by a woman was performed in the Church of England.

He was conductor of "Barnby's Choir" from 1864, at first giving concerts at St James's Hall and afterwards at Exeter Hall. In 1871 he was appointed, in succession to Charles Gounod, conductor of the Royal Albert Hall Choral Society, a post he held till his death. Meanwhile, he had left St Andrew's for a similar position at St Anne's, Soho. In 1875, he was precentor and director of music at Eton College, and in 1892 became principal of the Guildhall School of Music, receiving the honour of knighthood in July of that year. His works include an oratorio Rebekah, The Lord is King (Psalm 97), many services and anthems, and 246 hymn tunes (published in 1897 in one volume), as well as some partsongs and songs (among them, Now The Day Is Over, and the popular lullaby using Alfred, Lord Tennyson's words Sweet and Low) and some pieces for the pipe organ.

Barnby was an advocate of J.S. Bach's music, and proposed to Dean Stanley the 1870 performance of St John's Passion, with full orchestra and choir of 500 voices. He was largely instrumental in stimulating the love for Gounod's sacred music among the less educated part of the London public, although he displayed little practical sympathy with opera. On the other hand, he organized a remarkable concert performance of Parsifal at the Royal Albert Hall in London in 1884. He conducted the Cardiff Festivals of 1892 and 1895. He died in London and, after a special service in St Paul's Cathedral was buried in West Norwood Cemetery.

Discussing English composers, Barnby said: "Sullivan, of course, has done his work in a straightforward way, and gained all the success he could have hoped for. With regard, however, to men bitten with a desire to produce advanced music, the result so far has been scarcely so satisfactory."

A possibly apocryphal story about him got as far as New Zealand: A young contralto at the end of a Handel solo put in a high note instead of the less effective note usually sung. The conductor, Barnby, was shocked, and asked whether Miss – thought she was right to improve on Handel. "Well, Sir Joseph, said she, I’ve got an 'E' and I don’t see why I shouldn’t show it off". "Miss –," rejoined Barnby, "I believe you have two knees, but I hope you won’t show them off here".

== Bibliography ==
- Edwards, Frederick George (1901). "Barnby, Joseph" . In Lee, Sidney (ed.). Dictionary of National Biography (1st supplement). London: Smith, Elder & Co.
- Gatens, William J. 1986. Victorian Cathedral Music in Theory and Practice. New York: Cambridge University Press. ISBN 978-0-521-26808-0. See especially chapter 9.
- Palmer, Fiona M. 2017. Conductors in Britain 1870-1914: Wielding the Baton at the Height of Empire. Music in Britain, 1600-2000 (Book 15). Woodbridge, UK: Boydell & Brewer. ISBN 978-1-783-27145-0. See chapter 3.
- Woolacott, J.E. (1895). "Interviews with Eminent Musicians. No. 6 – Sir Joseph Barnby". The Strand Musical Magazine. Vol. 2, no. 1. London: George Newnes. pp. 3–7.
