= Adolf Benda =

Czech historian, council administrator and craftsman

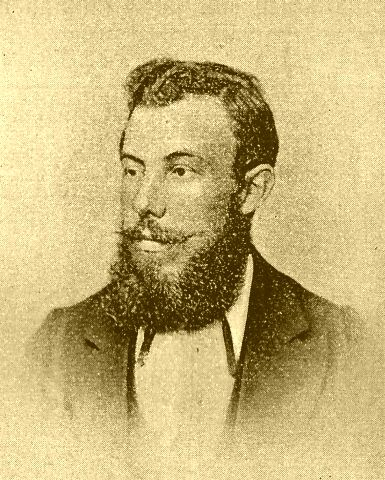
Adolf Benda, in c. 1870s

Adolf Benda (27 November 1845 – 12 November 1878) was a Czech regional historian, council administrator and glass and jewelry craftsman. A glass engraver by trade, he was also a prominent figure in public and social life in Jablonec. He served on the board of directors of the council and the Duchcov-Podmokly Railway. Benda is best known as the author of the Geschichte der Stadt Gablonz und ihrer Umgebung (History of the City of Jablonec nad Nisou), which was published in 1876–1877.

== Biography ==
Benda was born on 27 November 1845 in Jablonec nad Nisou, Bohemia, Austrian Empire (now in the Czech Republic). Most sources indicate he was born in 1845 and died in 1878 but several sources say he was born in 1841 and died in 1876.

He was the last of a notable family of Jizera glass engravers in the region, going back several centuries. His father, Edward Benda (1819-1901), was a member of the Rifle Brigade Jablonec (Schützenkorps). Benda attended the local school and was then taught the glass family trade. In 1866, he was sent with the Imperial Army to participate in the Austro-Prussian War. After returning, he began extensive research in local historical studies.

Benda became a prominent figure in public and social life in Jablonec, a member of several associations and served on the council. He was particularly involved in the Industrial and Educational Support Association (Industrieller Bildungs und Unterstützungsverein) and saw the importance of education in promoting economic development. From 1872, he was responsible for the federal library and in 1875 he became president of the Pindter Heinrich Association, until his death. Well connected politically, Benda was a noted liberal activist in the region and also served on the board of directors of the Duchcov-Podmokly Railway along with Herbert Gutman, Dr. Moriz Aron, and Richard Lederer.

He is best known as the author of the Geschichte der Stadt Gablonz und ihrer Umgebung which was published in 1876–77, shortly before his death. The book was the first complete history of the town, and took the perspective of the Jablonec craftsman, with attention to the social and economic life of the town, history and business development and civil society. In his work, Benda reported that in 1865 there were only 69 people in Jablonec, in comparison to 1876 when there were 145 in the whole district. The third section of the book is devoted to the Hussite Wars of the Prussian-Austrians; Benda, like his father, was interested in the military and weaponry. The fourth section is dedicated to local administration and the court and district affairs; and the fifth section, on industry, covers the important local industries including linen, cloth, manufacture of paper boxes, oil paintings and glass. The book also covers the ethnographic history of the city including its superstitions, tales and legends.

In the autumn of 1878 Benda contracted typhoid and died, on 12 November 1878, at almost 33 years of age. Today, Benda's book on the history of Jablonec is permanently on public display in the reading room of the Museum of Glass and Jewellery in Jablonec nad Nisou.
