= Maria Carolina Wolf =

German pianist, singer and composer (1742–1820)

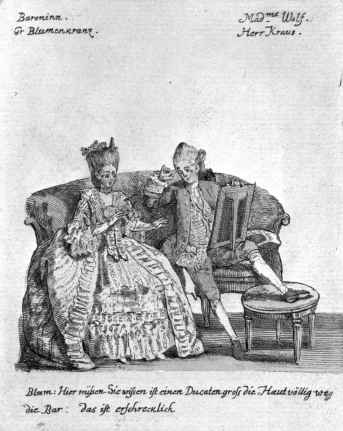
Benda, Maria Carolina.jpg

Maria Carolina Wolf, née Benda, (1742 – 2 August 1820) was a German pianist, singer and composer.

== Life ==
Maria Carolina Wolf's father was Franz Benda, first violinist and composer at the court of Frederick II, her aunt Anna Franziska Hattasch was a chamber singer and her uncle Georg Benda was conductor, both with appointments at the court of the Duke of Gotha. Wolf received piano and singing lessons from her father.

Before her appointment at the court, Benda had looked after her father's household because of the death of her mother in 1758. However, in 1761 she went on a concert tour with her father to Gotha, Weimar and Rudolstadt, during which her father remarried. At the Weimar court, Maria Benda met the Hofkonzertmeister Ernst Wilhelm Wolf, who received an appointment at the Duchess' court in 1768. Two years later the couple were married.

In 1775 Anna Amalia handed over the business of government to her son Carl August. Ernst Wilhelm Wolf remained as conductor under his reign, and Maria continued working as a singer. The Duchess developed an interest in theater, introduced in 1776 by Johann Wolfgang von Goethe. Maria Wolf worked in the plays as an actress and singer and with her husband composed songs with piano accompaniment. These were published in the Der Teutsche Merkur journal as 51 Lieder der besten deutschen Dichter mit Melodien (51 Best Songs of the German Poets with Melodies) and Mildheimischen Liederbuch (The Mild Homely Songbook).

Maria Wolf's husband died in 1792, and she continued to live in Weimar until she died on August 2, 1820.
