= Benda, Brebes =

Coordinates: 7°13′00″S 109°01′59″E

Benda is a village in the Brebes regency of Central Java, with 4,000 inhabitants.

There are seven neighborhoods in Benda: Benda I, Benda II, Karang Tengah, Karang Mulya, Kratagan, Bulawungu, and Jetak.

Benda is about 400 meters above sea level and lies alongside a valley, which means that the climate in the village is a little cooler than the lowland cities along the coast of Java.

Most of the villagers are farmers or small vendors, and rice fields extend on all sides of the village proper. More than 5% of the adult population has gone to the major cities to find work, but most people earn their living by providing food and services to the santri who go to school in Benda.
