= Friedrich Ludwig Benda =

German musician

Friedrich Ludwig Benda (Czech: Bedřich Ludvík Benda; baptized 4 September 1746 in Gotha – 20 or 27 March 1792 in Königsberg) was a German violinist and composer.

Benda was the eldest son of Georg Anton Benda. He was appointed concert director at Königsberg in 1789.

== Selected works ==
- Der Barbier von Sevilla, Singspiel in 4 acts (1776–1779); libretto by Friedrich Wilhelm Großmann after Beaumarchais
- Die Verlobung, Singspiel (1790); libretto by Friedrich Ernst Jester
- Louise, Singspiel in 3 acts (1791); libretto by Friedrich Ernst Jester
- Mariechen, Singspiel in 3 acts (1791–1792); libretto by Friedrich Ernst Jester
- Der Herr ist König, Psalm 97, Cantata
