= Hans von Benda =

German conductor

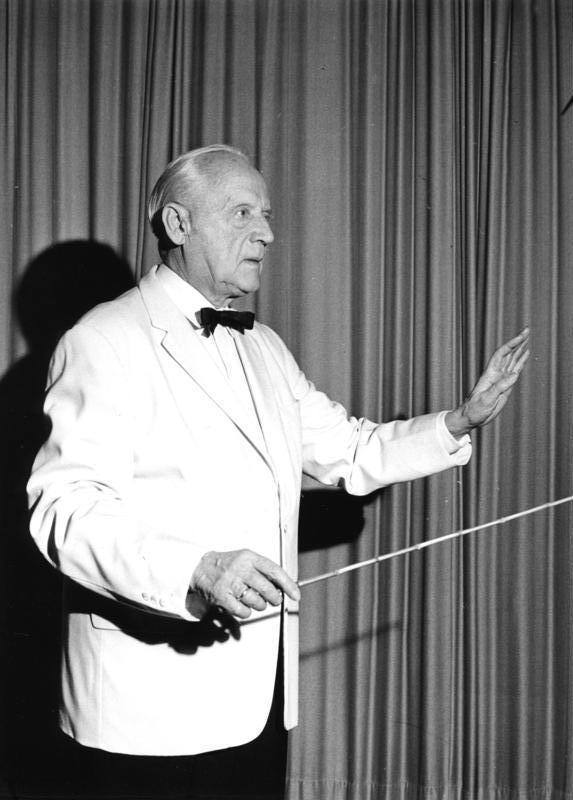
Hans von Benda in 1961

Hans von Benda (22 November 1888, in Strasbourg – 13 August 1972, in Berlin) was a German conductor.

A direct descendant of the eighteenth-century composer Franz Benda, he operated in the shadow of better-known German maestri of his generation, notably Wilhelm Furtwängler, Otto Klemperer, and Hans Knappertsbusch. After serving as musical director of Berlin Radio from 1926 to 1934, Benda became (1935) artistic director of the Berlin Philharmonic Orchestra, during Furtwängler's tenure as chief conductor. He held this post until 1939. Meanwhile, he conducted the Berlin Chamber Orchestra, which he had founded in 1932, and with which he toured Australia, South America and Asia as well as Europe. He was married to Karin Rosander, a Finnish violinist.

Unlike Furtwängler and Knappertsbusch (or Klemperer, who had fled Germany shortly after Hitler gained power), Benda joined the Nazi Party , possibly through fear that the regime would regard his Czech lineage as insufficiently Aryan. That his party card brought a certain amount of foreign obloquy on his head is indicated by the fact that (according to John L. Holmes' Conductors on Record) a pre-war recording Benda conducted of music by Gluck was issued in America without his name on the label. After World War II, Benda gave evidence during Furtwängler's denazification proceedings, avowing that Furtwängler had protected Jews from official persecution. Having worked in Spain from 1948 to 1952, Benda was subsequently employed at Radio Free Berlin (1954–1958).

Benda had a long recording career, lasting from the 1930s until 1968. Composers in his large discography include Bach, Vivaldi, Handel, Haydn, Mozart père and fils, Schubert, Dvořák, Respighi, C. P. E. Bach, Frederick the Great, Johann Adolf Hasse, Johann Joachim Quantz, Carl Heinrich Graun, and his own collateral ancestor Georg Benda. His conducting on disc tended towards a hefty, straightforward style wholly at odds with Furtwängler's and Knappertsbusch's improvisational unpredictability.

== See also ==
Hans Gustav Robert von Benda (1888–1972), conductor
