= Franz von Benda-Beckmann =

Legal anthropologist

- Born: 29 November 1941; Greifswald
- Died: 7 January 2013 (aged 71); Amsterdam
- Occupations: Legal anthropologist, University Privatdozent, professor and researcher

Franz von Benda-Beckmann (Greifswald, 29 November 1941 – Amsterdam, 7 January 2013) was a legal anthropologist who published many scholarly books and articles on legal anthropological theory and on property rights, social (in)security, and legal pluralism in developing countries. He held academic positions at the University of Zurich, Leiden University, Wageningen University & Research, and the Martin Luther University Halle-Wittenberg.

== Biography ==
Von Benda-Beckmann studied law at Kiel University, LMU Munich, and the University of Lausanne. He then wrote his Kiel doctoral thesis Geschichtliche Entwicklung und heutige Problematik des pluralistischen Rechtssystems eines ehemals britischen Kolonialgebiets based on 11 months of field work in Malawi. After an assistantship at the Ethnological Seminar of the University of Zurich and habilitation there in general ethnology in 1979, he taught as a Privatdozent in Zurich and as a privaatdocent in Leiden.

From 1981 to 2000, he was Professor of Law in Developing Countries at Wageningen Agricultural University. His wife Keebet von Benda-Beckmann and he jointly became research directors of the Legal Pluralism Project Group (German: Projektgruppe Rechtspluralismus) at the Max Planck Institute for Social Anthropology in Halle (Saale) in 2000, where he facilitated the establishment of the third Department of Law and Ethnology (Recht und Ethnologie).

Franz von Benda-Beckmann published 29 books and 266 articles, in part in co-authorship with his wife Keebet von Benda-Beckmann. He was active in national and international committees, such as the International Commission on Legal Pluralism of the International Union of Ethnological and Anthropological Sciences which he co-founded with his wife.

== Honours ==
Leipzig University appointed him Honorary Professor of Ethnology in 2002. In 2004, he became Honorary Professor of Legal Pluralism at the Martin Luther University Halle-Wittenberg.

== Publications ==
Von Benda-Beckmann published many scholarly books and articles, including:

- von Benda-Beckmann, Franz (1970). Rechtspluralismus in Malawi : Geschichtliche Entwicklung und heutige Problematik d. pluralistischen Rechtssystems e. ehemals britischen Kolonialgebiets. Afrika-Studien, Nr. 56. München: Weltforum Verlag. ISBN 9783803900401. OCLC 883357867. Juridical PhD dissertation, Kiel 1970.
  - Translated as von Benda-Beckmann, Franz (2007). Legal pluralism in Malawi : historical development 1858-1970 and emerging issues. Kachere monograph, no. 24. Zomba, Malawi: Kachere Series. JSTOR 10.1163. OCLC 162127181.
- von Benda-Beckmann, Franz (1979). Property in social continuity : continuity and change in the maintenance of property relationships through time in Minangkabau, West Sumatra. Verhandelingen van het Koninklijk Instituut voor Taal-, Land- en Volkenkunde, 86. The Hague: Martinus Nijhoff. ISBN 9789024721979. OCLC 781039509. Habilitation thesis, Koninklijk Instituut voor Taal, Land- en Volkenkunde, Leiden, 455 pages.
- von Benda-Beckmann, Franz (1988). Between kinship and the state : social security and law in developing countries. Dordrecht: Foris. ISBN 9789067653800. OCLC 19732799. 495 pages.
- von Benda-Beckmann, Franz (2002). "Who's afraid of legal pluralism?". Journal of Legal Pluralism and Unofficial Law. 47: 37. ISSN 0732-9113. OCLC 210803585.
- von Benda-Beckmann, Franz; von Benda-Beckmann, Keebet (2004). Struggles over communal property rights and law in Minangkabau, West Sumatra. Max-Planck-Institut für Ethnologische Forschung, No. 64. Halle/Saale: Max Planck Inst. for Social Anthropology. OCLC 76651075.
- von Benda-Beckmann, Franz; von Benda-Beckmann, Keebet (2007). Gesellschaftliche Wirkung von Recht: rechtsethnologische Perspektiven. Kulturwissenschaften (in German). Berlin: Reimer. ISBN 9783496028048. OCLC 255605341.
- von Benda-Beckmann, Franz; von Benda-Beckmann, Keebet (1 September 2008). "Social Security between Past and Future: Ambonese Networks of Care and Support". The Journal of Sociology & Social Welfare. 35. doi:10.15453/0191-5096.3377. OCLC 9883385322.
- von Benda-Beckmann, Franz; von Benda-Beckmann, Keebet (2009). Rules of law and laws of ruling : on the governance of law. Translated by Eckert, Julia M. Farnham, Surrey, England: Ashgate Pub. ISBN 9780754672395. OCLC 271812375.
- von Benda-Beckmann, Franz; von Benda-Beckmann, Keebet (2013). Political and legal transformations of an Indonesian polity : the Nagari from colonisation to decentralisation. Cambridge studies in law and society. Cambridge: Cambridge University Press. ISBN 9781107416925. OCLC 858861821.

== Secondary literature ==
- Beyer, Judith; Weilenmann, Markus (2013). "Franz von Benda-Beckmann 1941–2013". Zeitschrift für Ethnologie (in German). 138 (1): 105–110. JSTOR 24364892. OCLC 5558087706.
- Turner, Bertram (2 September 2015). "Exploring avenues of research in legal pluralism: forward-looking perspectives in the work of Franz von Benda-Beckmann". The Journal of Legal Pluralism and Unofficial Law. 47 (3): 375. doi:10.1080/07329113.2015.1113690. ISSN 0732-9113. OCLC 5997469501.
