= Skalsko (Mladá Boleslav District) =

- Municipality
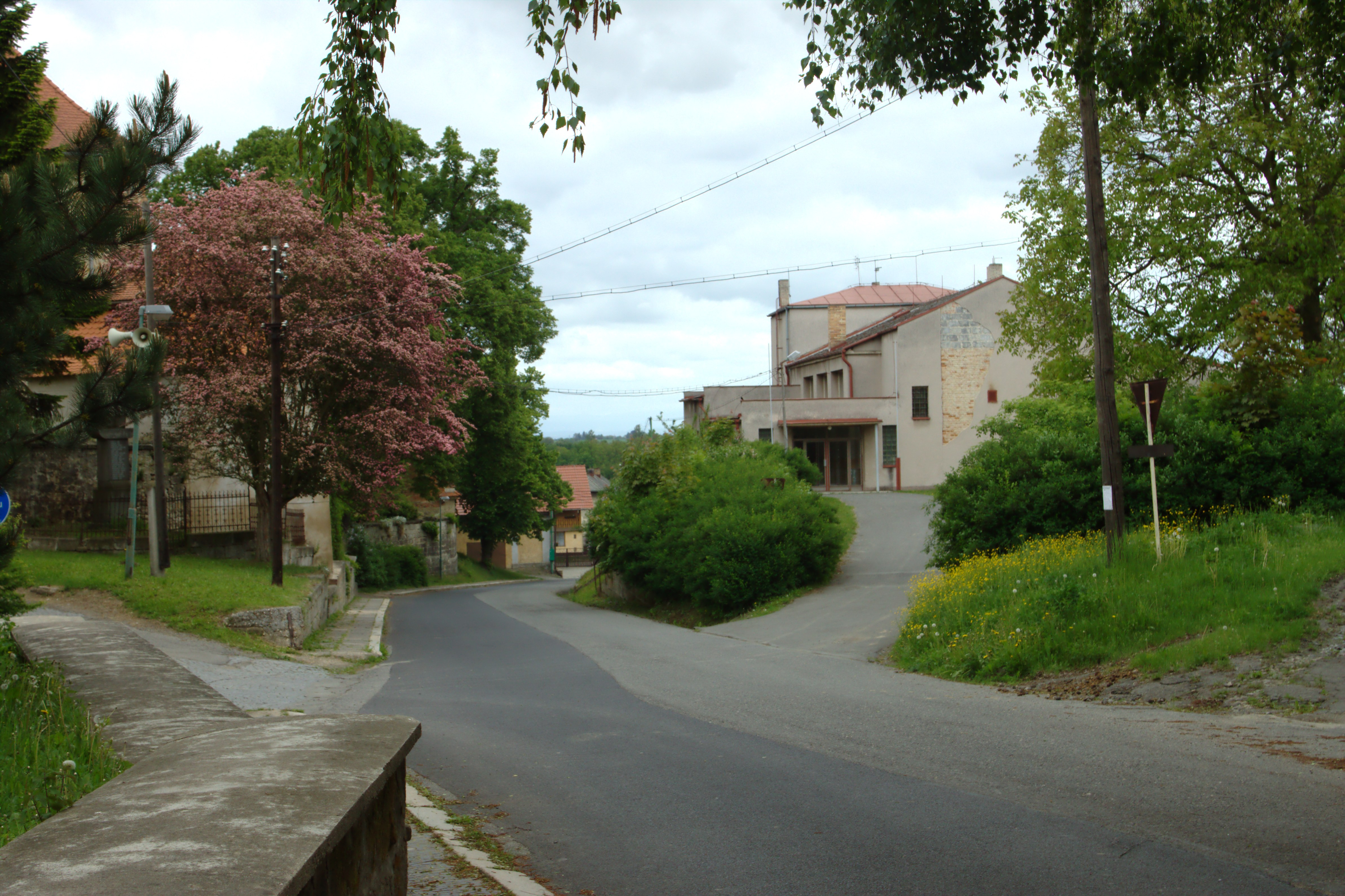
- Main road

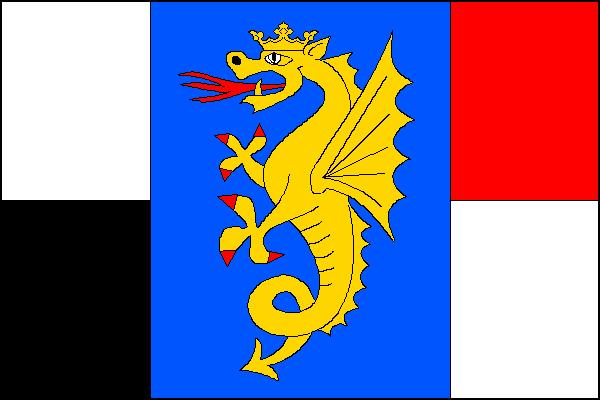
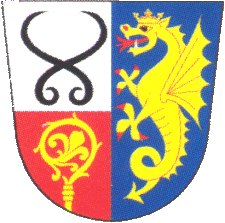
- Flag Coat of arms

- Location in the Czech Republic
- Coordinates: 50°25′38″N 14°45′33″E
- Country: Czech Republic
- Region: Central Bohemian
- District: Mladá Boleslav
- First mentioned: 1352

Area
  - Total: 4.97 km^{2} (1.92 sq mi)
- Elevation: 312 m (1,024 ft)

Population (2026-01-01)
  - Total: 389
  - Density: 78.3/km^{2} (203/sq mi)
- Time zone: UTC+1 (CET)
  - Summer (DST): UTC+2 (CEST)
- Postal code: 294 26
- Website: www.skalsko.cz

Skalsko is a municipality and village in Mladá Boleslav District in the Central Bohemian Region of the Czech Republic. It has about 400 inhabitants. Most of the village has well preserved character and is protected as a village monument zone.

== Etymology ==
The name is derived from the Czech word skála ('rock'). The suffix -sko indicates that the village may have been founded on the site on an abandoned village (called Skála or Skály) and partially took its name.

== Geography ==
Skalsko is located about 10 kilometres (6 mi) west of Mladá Boleslav and 39 km (24 mi) northeast of Prague. It lies in the Jizera Table, on an elevated plateau above the stream Strenický potok.

== History ==
The first written mention of Skalsko is from 1352. From 1632 to 1785, the village was property of the Servite Order. The Servits had built here a castle as their summer residence. From 1809 to 1843, Skalsko was owned by Count Karel of Rohan. The last noble owners of the village before the establishment of an independent municipality were the Thurn und Taxis family.

== Demographics ==
Historical population

Year	Pop.	±%
1869	558	—
1880	562	+0.7%
1890	554	−1.4%
1900	588	+6.1%
1910	650	+10.5%

Year	Pop.	±%
1921	572	−12.0%
1930	556	−2.8%
1950	378	−32.0%
1961	367	−2.9%
1970	337	−8.2%

Year	Pop.	±%
1980	298	−11.6%
1991	310	+4.0%
2001	371	+19.7%
2011	397	+7.0%
2021	382	−3.8%

Source: Censuses

== Transport ==
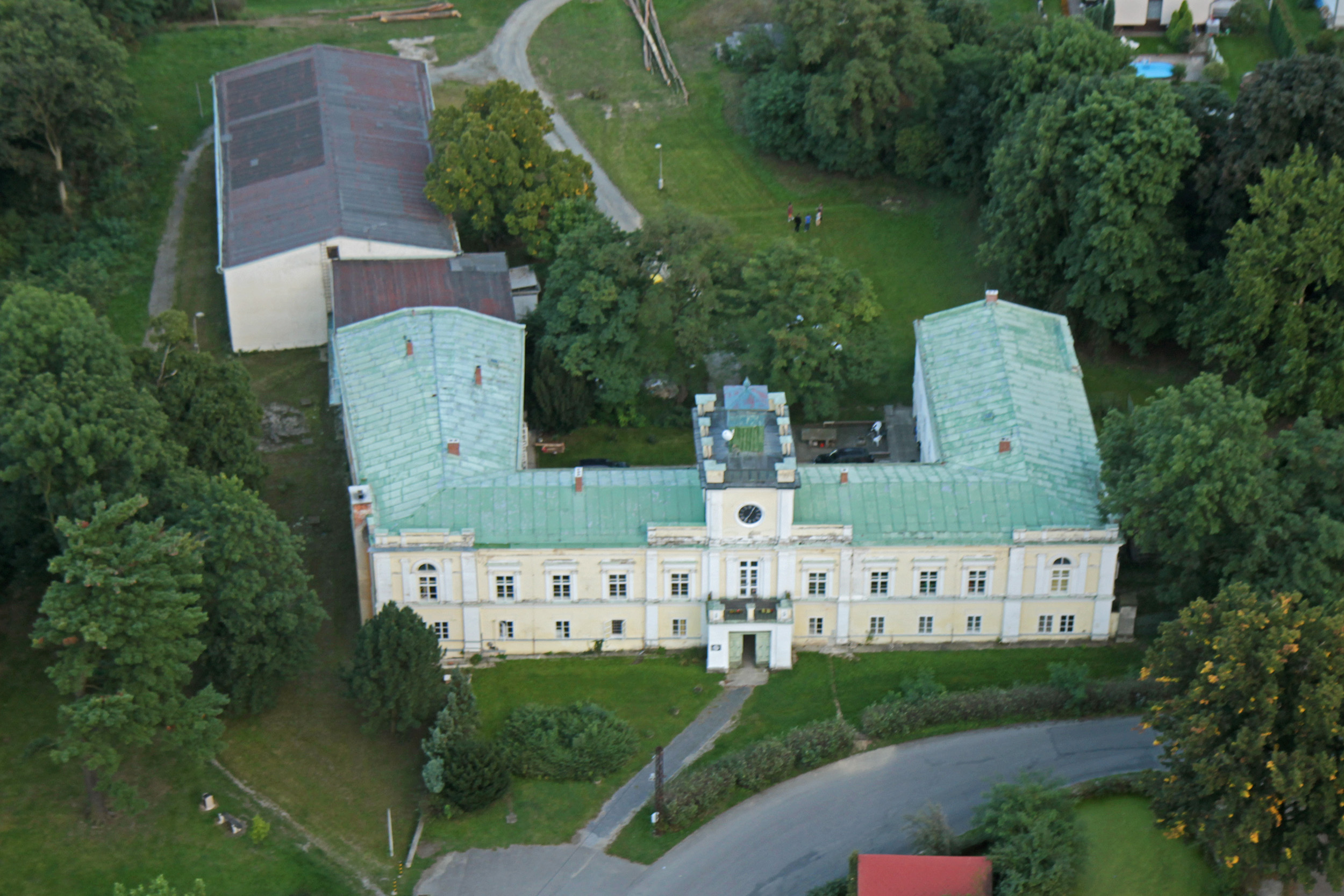
Skalsko Castle

Skalsko is located on the railway line Mladá Boleslav–Mladějov.

== Sights ==
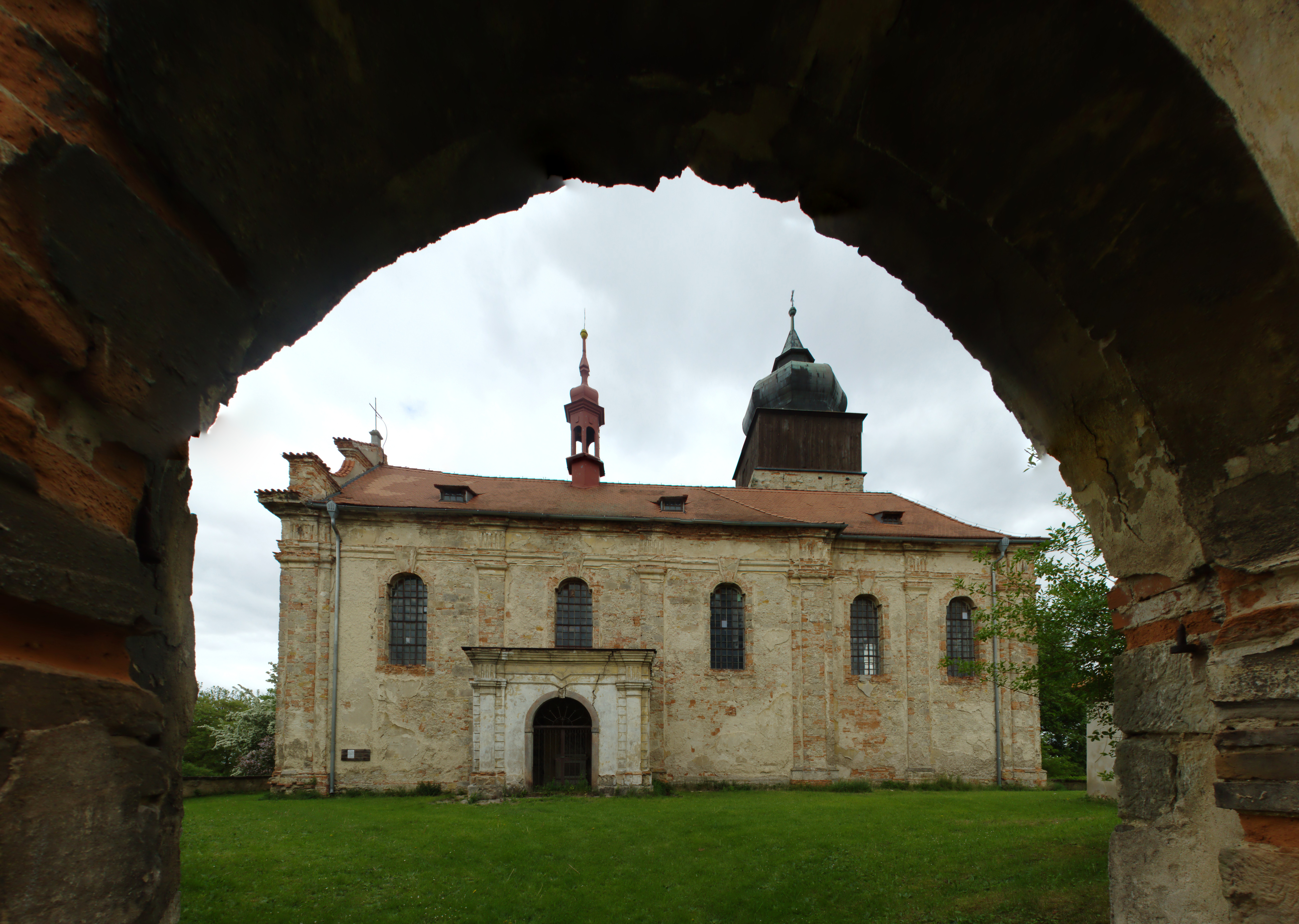
Church od Saint Gall

The main landmark of Skalsko is the Church of Saint Gall. It was built in the 14th century and rebuilt in the Baroque style in the first half of the 18th century.

The Skalsko Castle was originally a Baroque building from the 17th century, rebuilt in the Neoclassical style in 1878. Today it houses a secondary school.

Most of the village is protected as a village monument zone for its set of timber buildings dating from the 18th to the beginning of the 19th century, supplemented by other valuable buildings from the first half 19th century.

== Notable people ==
- Felix Benda (1708–1768), composer and organist
