= Nancy Tribble Benda =

Actress, educator, and a pioneer of early educational television

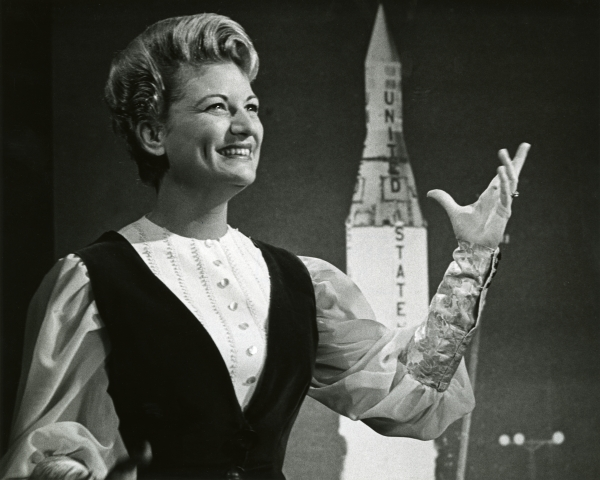
- Scene from "Miss Nancy's Store"
- Born: April 2, 1930; Deland, Florida
- Died: July 28, 2015 (aged 85); Tallahassee, Florida
- Education: Florida State University
- Occupation: Educator
- Known for: Miss Nancy's Store

Nancy Tribble Benda (April 2, 1930 – July 28, 2015) was an actress, educator, and a pioneer of early educational television with her show Miss Nancy’s Store.

== Early years ==
As a teenager, Nancy Tribble was one of the first mermaids at Weeki Wachee Springs. Her swimming status got her a trip to Hollywood to be Ann Blyth's swimming double in the 1948 film Mr. Peabody and the Mermaid. She was fitted for a mermaid costume for the movie which cost $18,000 to create. As a result of the publicity generated by the movie and her performance, she received a key to the city of Tampa, Florida.

She was a member of the Alpha Xi Delta sorority and also participated in the Tarpon Club. After Miss Nancy’s Store, Benda went on to work for the Florida Department of Education. She received recognition for her work by governor, Lawton Chiles as well as receiving the Rosa Parks Award for Leadership from Florida State University.

== Miss Nancy's Store ==
Miss Nancy’s Store was syndicated from WFSU-TV and was one of the earliest children's television shows, a precursor to Mister Rogers' Neighborhood. Benda, a school teacher at the time, took a summer school class learning about educational television. She and other school teachers created a curriculum for a fifth grade social studies class to be broadcast on television. Benda was selected to be the on-air teacher. The first course of the history-themed puppet show, called "Our Nation’s Story," first aired on February 1, 1962.

Benda's role shifted from classroom teaching to being a "television teacher" through a Florida programming initiative called Through the TV Tube, offering telecourses for school credit. In 1965, the Florida Department of Education and WFSU-TV created, Miss Nancy’s Store, an educational puppet show designed to improve childhood literacy. The show appeared on all six public TV stations in Florida five nights per week at 5:00 p.m.

== Personal life ==
Nancy Tribble was born in DeLand, Florida, in 1930 to Lewis and Hillis Tribble. Her family moved to Tallahassee in 1939. She was educated at Leon High School and Florida State University, where she received a BA and a master’s in elementary education supervision via correspondence graduate courses. She married architect Charles Benda in 1950. She died of cancer in 2015. Her papers are held by the State Archives of Florida.
