= Friedrich Benda =

German musician

Friedrich Wilhelm Heinrich Benda (15 July 1745 in Potsdam – 19 June 1814 in Potsdam) was a German violinist, pianist and composer of the classical era.

Benda was the son of violin virtuoso and composer Franz Benda, from whom he received his first musical lessons. Later he studied music theory and composition with Johann Kirnberger in Berlin. In addition to his compositional achievements, he was an accomplished pianist and violinist. In the years 1765–1810, Benda was a chamber musician at the Prussian Court in Potsdam where his compositions found much acceptance.

Benda composed concertos, operas, and chamber music.

== Selected works ==
- Pygmalion, Cantata (1784)
- Alceste, Singspiel (1785)
- Orpheus, Singspiel (1787)
- Das Blumenmädchen, Singspiel (1806)
- Die Grazien, Cantata

== Selected recordings ==
- Viola Concertos Nos. 1-3, Jean-Éric Soucy, SWR Sinfonieorchester Baden-Baden und Freiburg, Bernard Labadie, cpo 2018
