= Franz Benda =

Czech violinist and composer (1709–1786)

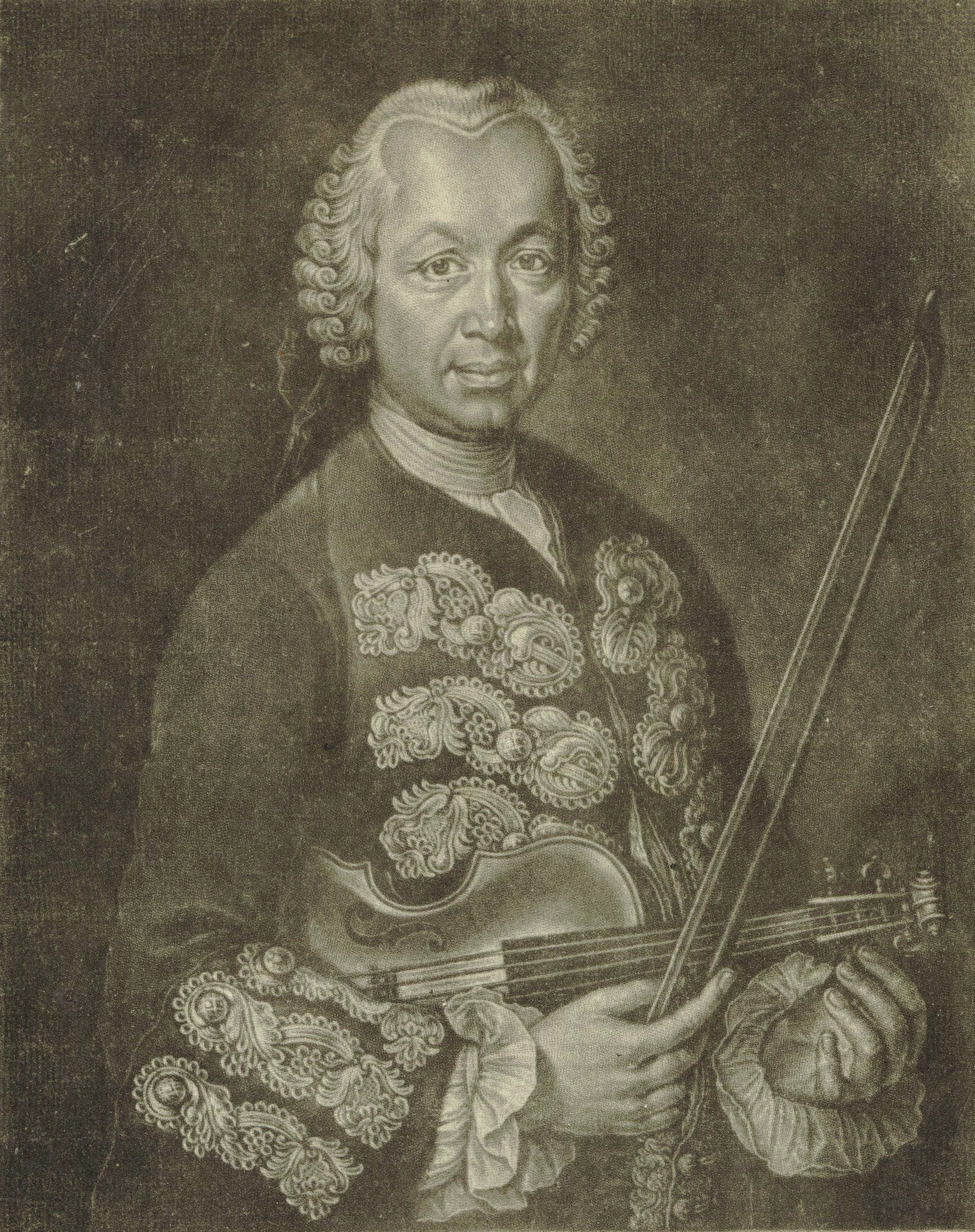
Franz Benda

Franz Benda (Czech: František Benda; c. 22 November 1709 – 7 March 1786) was a Czech violinist and composer. He was active in the Kingdom of Prussia and worked for much of his life at the court of Frederick the Great.

== Life ==
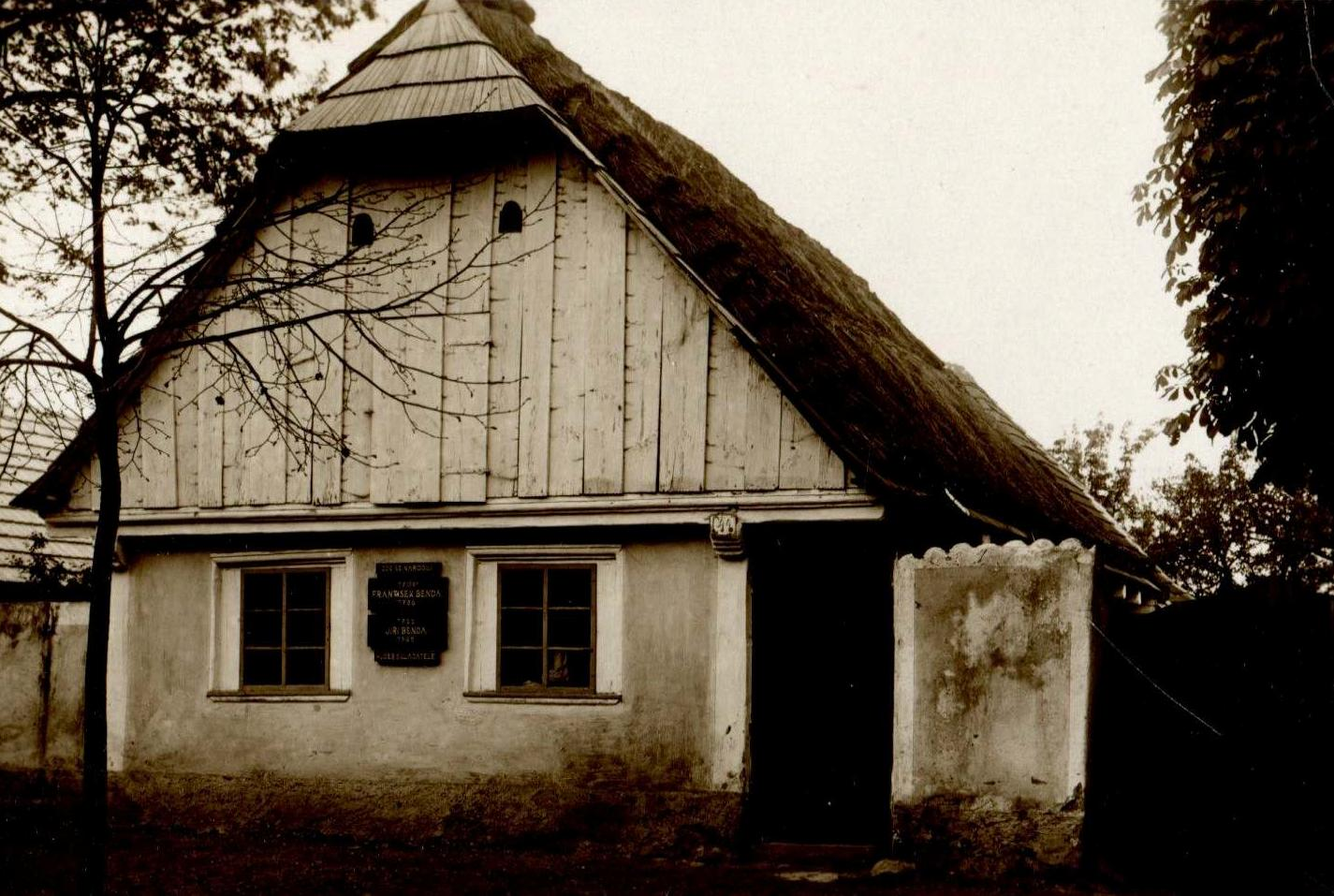
Benda family house in Benátky nad Jizerou, built 1706–1707, demolished 1936

Benda was baptised on 22 November 1709. He was born in Benátky nad Jizerou in Bohemia, the son of Jan Jiří Benda. His brother was the composer Georg Benda. Many of Benda's offspring (Maria Carolina Wolf (1742–1820), Friedrich Benda (1745–1814), Karl Hermann Heinrich Benda (1748–1836), Juliane Reichardt (1752–1783)) and his granddaughter (Louise Reichardt (1779–1826)) were also composers. Benda wrote his autobiography in 1763: it not only gives a detailed account of his own life, but also a valuable record of the lives of other musicians whom he encountered during his career.

In his youth Benda was a chorister in Prague and afterward in the Chapel Royal at Dresden. At the same time he began to study the violin, and soon joined a company of strolling musicians who attended fetes, fairs, etc. At eighteen years of age Benda abandoned this wandering life and returned to Prague, going to Vienna, where he pursued his study of the violin under Johann Gottlieb Graun, a pupil of Tartini. After two years he was appointed chapel master at Warsaw. In 1732, he entered the service of Frederick the Great, then crown prince of Prussia, with whom he remained the rest of his life. He was a member of the crown prince's orchestra, and later became concertmaster to the king. He played about 50,000 concertos over a period of forty years. At Benda's request, Frederick allowed his parents and siblings to move to Potsdam when, as Protestants, they suffered religious persecution in Bohemia.

Benda was a master of all the difficulties of violin playing, and the rapidity of his execution and the mellow sweetness of his highest notes were unequalled. He had many pupils and wrote a number of works, chiefly exercises and studies for the violin.

Benda died in the Nowawes, a small colony near Potsdam set up by Frederick the Great to house Protestant refugees fleeing religious persecution in Bohemia.

== Legacy ==
Descendants of Benda also continue in the same musical line. In the 20th century, František Benda was a composer of film scores and other works. The Benda Chamber Orchestra, which carries and honours the name of the Benda musical family, was founded in 1956 in Ústí nad Labem, Czechoslovakia (now the Czech Republic).

One of his descendants, Jean Sebastian Benda, acclaimed Swiss pianist, lived in Brazil, having married the pianist Luzia Benda. After his return to Europe, in 1981, along with his wife and children born in Brazil, his family follows the musical tradition of their ancestors.

== Compositions ==
Benda composed 17 symphonies, numerous concerti and sonatas for violin, and other chamber works.
