= Georg Benda =

Czech composer and violinist (1722–1795)

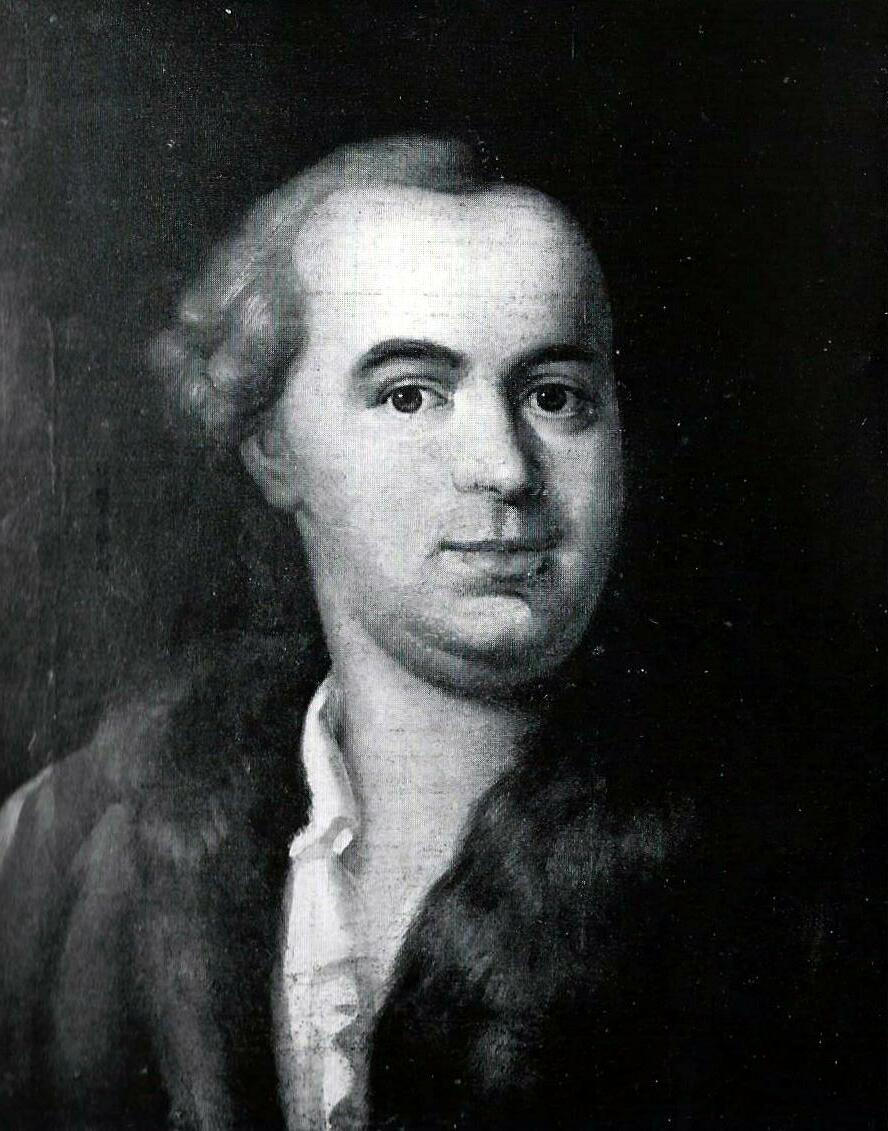
Benda in c. 1752

Georg Anton Benda (Czech: Jiří Antonín Benda; 30 June 1722 – 6 November 1795) was a Czech composer, violinist and Kapellmeister of the classical period. He was active mostly in German-speaking lands during the Sturm und Drang era.

== Biography ==
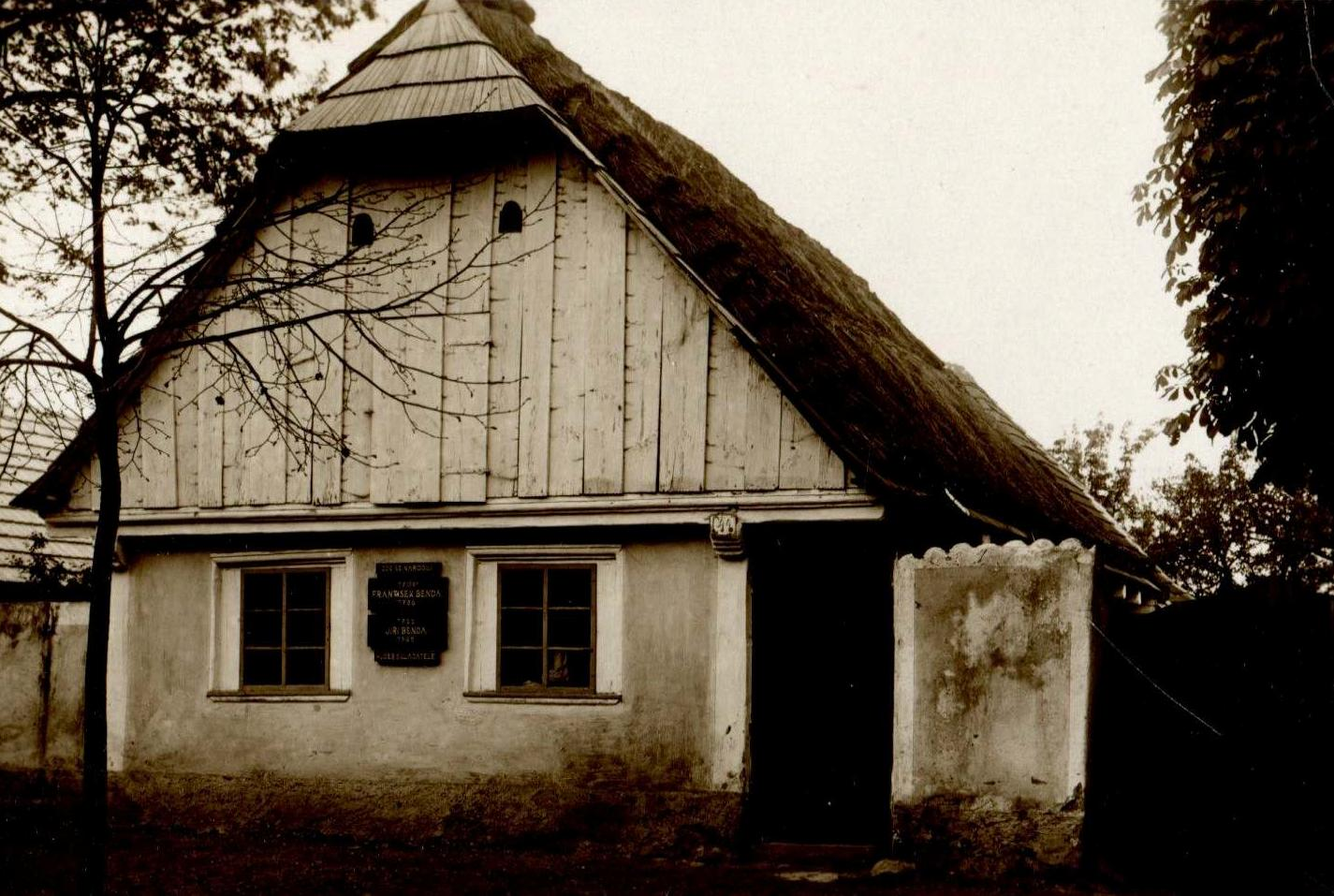
Benda family house in Benátky nad Jizerou, built 1706/07, demolished 1936

Born into a family of notable musicians in Staré Benátky (today Benátky nad Jizerou), Bohemia, he studied at the Piarist Gymnasium (grammar school) in Kosmonosy and at the Jesuit Gymnasium in Jičín from 1735 to 1742. Benda was 19 when Frederick the Great bestowed upon him in 1741 the position of second violinist in the chapel of Berlin. The following year Benda was summoned to Potsdam as a composer and arranger for his older brother Franz, himself an illustrious composer and violinist. Seven years later, in 1749, he entered the service of the Duke of Gotha as Kapellmeister, where he constantly cultivated his talents for composition, specializing in religious music.

A stipend from the duke allowed Benda to take a study trip to Italy in 1764. He returned to Gotha in 1766, and devoted himself to composition. In all, he wrote about ten operas, several operettas, and the melodramas Ariadne auf Naxos, Medea and Almansor und Nadine. In 1778 he resigned his position and visited Hamburg, Vienna and other cities, and finally settled at the little hamlet of Köstritz.

Sonatina in A minor for Piano

Benda's most important contribution lies in the development of the German melodramas, a form of musical stage entertainment which influenced Mozart. In 1774, the Swiss-born director Abel Seyler's theatrical company arrived in Gotha, and Seyler commissioned Benda to write several successful melodramas, including Ariadne auf Naxos, Medea and Pygmalion. Ariadne auf Naxos is generally considered his best work. At its debut in 1775, the opera received enthusiastic reviews in Germany and afterwards, in the whole of Europe, with music critics calling attention to its originality, sweetness, and ingenious execution. Besides that he wrote many instrumental pieces including many sinfonias, keyboard sonatas, keyboard concertos, violin concertos and a smaller number of trio sonatas, violin sonatas and flute sonatas.

Benda also wrote music for masonic rituals.

Benda died in Köstritz, Saxe-Gotha-Altenburg, at the age of 73, leaving his son, Friedrich Ludwig Benda (1752–1796), who briefly carried on the family musical tradition, serving as a music director in Hamburg and later at Ludwigslust Castle in Mecklenburg, before finally becoming the concertmaster in Königsberg. He died less than a year after his father.

Benda's Harpsichord Concerto in C was featured in Apple Computer's 1987 Knowledge Navigator concept video.

== Operas and melodramas ==
- Xindo riconosciuto (libretto by Giovanni Andrea Galletti, opera seria, 1765, Gotha)
- Il buon marito (libretto by Galletti, Intermezzo, 1766, Gotha)
- Il nuove maestro di capella (Intermezzo, 1766, Gotha)
- Ariadne auf Naxos (libretto by Johann Christian Brandes, melodrama, 1775, Gotha)
- Der Jahrmarkt (Der Dorfjahrmarkt/Lukas und Bärbchen) (libretto by Friedrich Wilhelm Gotter, Singspiel, 1775, Gotha)
- Medea (libretto by Gotter, melodrama, 1775, Leipzig)
- Walder (libretto by Gotter, Singspiel, 1776, Gotha)
- Romeo und Julie (libretto by Gotter, Singspiel, 1776, Gotha)
- Der Holzhauer oder Die drey Wünsche (libretto by Gotter, Singspiel, 1778, Gotha)
- Pygmalion (libretto by Gotter, melodrama, 1779, Vienna)
- Philon und Theone, revised as Almansor und Nadine (1791), (unknown librettist, melodrama, 1779, Vienna)
- Das tartarische Gesetz (libretto by Gotter, Singspiel, 1787, Mannheim)
