= Die Geisterinsel =

Die Geisterinsel (German for The Enchanted Island) may refer to:

- Die Geisterinsel (libretto)
- Die Geisterinsel (Reichardt)
- Die Geisterinsel (Fleischmann)
- Die Geisterinsel (Zumsteeg)

== See also ==
- Enchanted Island (disambiguation)
