= Die Geisterinsel (libretto) =

1797 opera libretto by Friedrich Wilhelm Gotter

Die Geisterinsel (German for The Enchanted Island) is an opera libretto written by German poet and dramatist Friedrich Wilhelm Gotter (1746–1797), based on a 1778 version by his friend Friedrich von Einsiedel. The libretto is based on Thomas Shadwell's operatic adaptation of Dryden's The Enchanted Island, which in turn is inspired by Shakespeare's The Tempest. Following Gotter's death, his widow was persuaded by Schiller to publish the late husband's libretto in his Die Horen, appearing in issues 8 and 9 of 1797.

The libretto was initially set to music by Friedrich Fleischmann for a Singspiel that premiered in 1798 in Weimar under Goethe's direction. However, Fleischmann's setting did not achieve significant success and was overshadowed by Johann Friedrich Reichardt's second setting of Die Geisterinsel, which premiered in Berlin in 1798. Subsequently, five more musical adaptations of the libretto were composed in 1879, and another version by Johann Rudolf Zumsteeg premiered in Dresden in 1805.
