= Nannette Streicher =

German piano maker and composer (1769–1833)

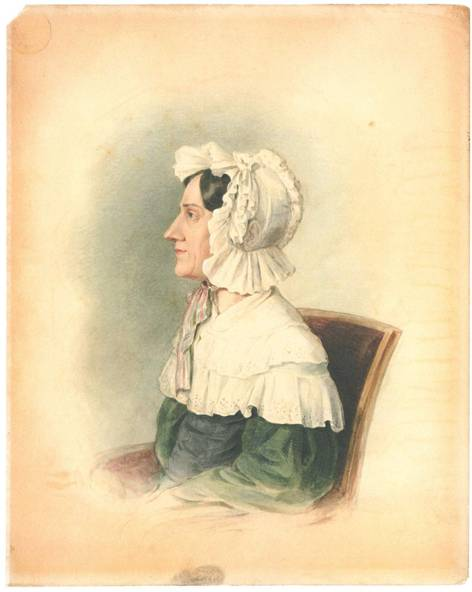
Nanette Streicher – ink drawing by Ludwig Krones, 1836

Nannette Streicher (née Anna-Maria Stein; 2 January 1769, Augsburg – 16 January 1833, Vienna) was a German piano maker, composer, music educator, writer and a close friend of Ludwig van Beethoven.

== Life ==
Nannette Streicher was the sixth child of the organ and piano maker Johann Andreas Stein in Augsburg (1728–1792) and his wife Maria Regina Stein née Burkhart. Early on, she received piano lessons from her father, who was influenced by his friend Ignaz von Beecke. In Augsburg Nannette Stein played piano at concerts, sometimes with her friend Nanette von Schaden. In 1787 she sang "some minor arias" in a concert. The musicologist Johann Friedrich Reichardt visited the Stein family in 1789, and after hearing Nannette play piano, commented that. . . “she has a complete orchestra under her two hands.” She had to give up singing later for health reasons. After her father's death on 29 February 1792, she continued the piano workshop independently.

== Building pianos ==
In 1793 she married the musician Johann Andreas Streicher (1761–1833) and moved with him to Vienna in 1794. She took over her father's business, which was called J.A. Stein. Initially she partnered with her 16-year-old younger brother Matthias Andreas Stein (1776-1842) under the business name Geschwister Stein. After 1802, she and her brother parted company, and she continued building pianos under her name (Nannette Streicher née Stein). With the support of her husband and from 1824 to 1825 with their son, Johann Baptist (1796–1871) as a partner, the business became an important piano manufacturer. They produced 50 to 65 grand pianos each year. Johann Baptist Streicher was the sole owner of the factory, which under his leadership acquired many patents and became world famous. The company was sold in 1896 to the brothers Stingl. Two fine instruments by Streicher are in the collection of Scenkonstmuseet (earlier known as Musikmuseet) in Stockholm, Sweden. They are numbered M266 & F332.

A grand piano by Nannette Streicher née Stein (Vienna, 1823, serial no. 1756), commissioned by King George IV and on loan from the Royal Collection, is held at Hatchlands Park in Surrey as part of the Cobbe Collection, the world's largest collection of composer-associated historic keyboard instruments.

== Concerts ==
Nannette and Andreas Streicher were not just piano makers. The concerts she organised were an important contribution to Viennese musical life, first in her apartment, then from 1812 in a piano salon she organized next-door to the Streicher showrooms. This seated 300, and offered young artists welcome opportunities for performance. The friends and customers of the couple included Ludwig van Beethoven and Johann Wolfgang von Goethe.

== Social circle ==
Nannette sometimes played in private before the friends and visitors of the music circle, sometimes together with her daughter Sophie (1797–1840), an equally gifted piano player. Her circle included many great musicians of Vienna, and her friendship with Beethoven was such that for eighteen months beginning in 1817 she assumed considerable responsibility for his domestic arrangements. This is documented in more than sixty letters, in which the composer sought advice and assistance in household and educational questions, after he was granted custody of his nephew Karl.

== Death ==
Nanette Streicher died on 16 January 1833 after two months of illness.

== Selected works ==
- Klage über den frühen Tod der Jungfer Ursula Sabina Stage. Für eine Singstimme und Klavier (c-Moll), Augsburg 1788.
- Marche à huit Instruments à vent. N. Simrock, Bonn & Cologne, 1817.
- Deux Marches pour le Piano Forte. Composées par Madame Nannette Streicher née Stein. Prix 75 Cs. Bonn et Cologne chez N. Simrock. Propriété de l‘Editeur 1378. [1827.]

Recordings made with instruments by Nannette Streicher

- Ines Schüttengruber. Ludwig van Beethoven, Johann Nepomuk Hummel, Franz Schubert, Ignaz Moscheles, Jan Václav Voříšek, Nannette Streicher. The Nannette Streicher Fortepiano. Label: Gramola. Played on a fortepiano by Nannette Streicher (1813).
- Hans Jorg Mammel, Arthur Schoonderwoerd. Franz Schubert. Die schöne Müllerin. Label: Alpha. Played on a Nannette Streicher fortepiano (1814).
- Tobias Koch. Nannette Streicher, Andreas Streicher. Works for Piano. Label: CPO. Played on fortepianos by Nannette Streicher (1814) and Johann Andreas Stein (1784).
- Tobias Koch. Ludwig van Beethoven. In Search of New Paths: Piano Sonatas Nos. 8-18. Label: Avi-Music. Played on fortepianos by Johann Gottlieb Fichtl (1803), Nannette Streicher (1816) and Michael Rosenberger (1810).
- Tobias Koch. Daniel Gottlob Türk, Johann Friedrich Reichardt, Carl Loewe. Haendeliana Hallensis 2. Label: Querstand. Played on clavichord Carl Gottlob Sauer (1805) and fortepianos by Johann Evangelist Schmidt (1786), Anton Walter & Sohn (1820) and Nannette Streicher (1820).
- Tobias Koch. Ludwig van Beethoven. Complete Piano Pieces. Label: Avi-Music. Played on fortepianos by Michael Rosenberger (1810), Conrad Graf (1827), Nannette Streicher & Sohn (1825), orphica (ca. 1800) and tangent piano by Späth und Schmahl (1790) and Nannette Streicher fortepiano (1816).
- Tobias Koch. Ludwig van Beethoven. The New Complete Edition. Labels: Deutsche Grammophon & Decca. Played on a Nannette Streicher & Sohn fortepiano (1832).
- Tobias Koch. Franz Schubert. Schubertiade. Label: Kempen Klassik. Played on a Nannette Streicher & Sohn fortepiano (1832).
- Gerrit Zitterbart. Franz Schubert. Sonate B-Dur D 960, Scherzi D 593, Diverse Tänze. Label: Clavier. Played on a down-striking Nannette Streicher & Sohn fortepiano (1829).
- Gerrit Zitterbart. Felix Mendelssohn, Franz Schubert. "1829": Claviermusik um 1829 von Schubert und Mendelssohn. Label: Clavier. Played on a down-striking Nannette Streicher & Sohn fortepiano (1829).
- Stig Ribbing. Johann Gottlieb Naumann, Johann Martin Kraus, Johan Wikmanson, Johan Agrell, Olof Ahlström. Gustavian Klaviermusik. Label: Sterling: News. Played on a down-striking Nannette Streicher fortepiano (1825), and instruments by Johann Andreas Stumpff and others.
- Dmitry Ablogin. Ludwig van Beethoven. Diabelli Variations. Label: Organum Classics. Played on pianos by Johann Nannette Streicher & Sohn (1825) and Fazioli (2018).
- Jan Vermeulen. Franz Schubert. Works for fortepiano. Vols. 1-6. Label: Etcetera. Played on a Nannette Streicher fortepiano (1826).
- Ludwig Sémerjian. Wolfgang Amadeus Mozart. Les dernières sonates, Vol. 6. Label: ATMA Classique. Played on a Nannette Streicher fortepiano (1804).

Recordings made with copies of instruments by Nannette Streicher

- Nancy Argenta, Melvyn Tan, Eric Hoeprich. Franz Schubert. Der Hirt auf dem Felsen, 22 Lieder. Label: EMI. Fortepiano by Derek Adlam (Weldbeck, 1983) after Nannette Streicher (Vienna, 1814).
- Lambert Orkis. Franz Schubert. 3 Klavierstücke D946, 6 Moments Musicaux D780. Label: Virgin Classics. Fortepiano by Thomas and Barbara Wolf (Washington, 1990) after Nannette Streicher.
- Michael Tsalka. Ferdinand Ries. Romantic Variations, Fantasies and a Rondo. Label: Naxos. Fortepianos by Thomas and Barbara Wolf after Johann Schanz (c. 1800, replica: 1997) and Nannette Streicher (c. 1815, replica: 1994) and by R. J. Reiger (Freeport, 1993) after Conard Graf (c. 1824).
- Malcolm Bilson. Franz Schubert. Piano Sonatas. Label: Hungaroton. Fortepiano by Thomas and Barbara Wolf (1998) after Nannette Streicher (Vienna, 1814).
- Randall Love. Fortepiano Music of Jan Voříšek. Jan Václav Voříšek. Label: Titanic. Fortepiano by Thomas and Barbara Wolf (1989) after Nannette Streicher (1815).
- L'Orfeo Barockorchester, Michi Gaigg. Felix Mendelssohn. String Symphonies, Vol. 2. Label: CPO. Fortepiano by Karl-Heinz Hug (Bergdietikon) after Nannette Streicher (Vienna, 1819).
