= Bernhard Flies =

German composer

Bernhard Flies (born about 1770 in Berlin) was a German amateur composer and a doctor of medicine.

Little is known about Flies. He composed some piano pieces and songs. He is best known for the romantic music to the lullaby Schlafe, mein Prinzchen, schlaf ein, (Sleep, my little prince, go to sleep) attributed to him, also known as Das Wiegenlied (the Cradle Song), from the theatre play "Esther" written by Friedrich Wilhelm Gotter (1746–1797). Recent research suggests that the song was originally composed by Johann Friedrich Anton Fleischmann. For a long time, the composition was mistakenly attributed to Wolfgang Amadeus Mozart (K. 350 in the Köchel-Verzeichnis).
