= Nancy B. Reich =

American musicologist (1924–2019)

Nancy Bassen Reich (July 3, 1924 in New York City - January 31, 2019 in Ossining, NY) was an American musicologist, most renowned for her 1985 biography of Clara Schumann.

== Biography ==
She attended the High School of Music and Art, where she played viola and violin. She obtained a bachelor's degree in music in 1945 at Queens College, and a master's degree in 1947 at Columbia University's Teachers College. She received her PhD in 1972 from New York University.

In the 1960s she studied application of computers to music making, music reading, and music pedagogy. At NYU she worked at the Institute for Computer Research in the Humanities, and released an early catalog of composer William Jay Sydeman's compositions (Sydeman lived until 2021); this was a notable early effort in creating a machine-readable document. A 2nd edition was released in 1968. 35 years later, in 2001, she would write the Grove Dictionary of Music's entry for Sydeman. She investigated music notation digitization and replay on early IBM 1130 computers.

Reich taught at NYU, Queens College, and Manhattanville College. While at Manhattanville, she discovered the first four pages of a Franz Liszt composition (Introduction and Variations on a March from Rossini's Siege of Corinth) previously thought lost, and subsequently researched its provenance.

She was a visiting professor at Bard and Williams, and was a visiting scholar at the Center for Research on Women at Stanford University. She was heavily involved in advancing feminist musicology studies, including chairing the College Music Society's Committee on the Status of Women in Music, and editing its major bibliographic report CMS Report No. 5: Women's Studies/Women's Status. She contributed the chapter European composers and musicians, ca. 1800-1890 to the college textbook Women & Music, A History. Joan Tower, who joined the faculty of Bard College in 1972, credits Reich's course on the history of women in music with changing her life.

In 1985 she published her seminal biography Clara Schumann: The Artist and the Woman, the first scholarly biography of a woman composer. The first half of the book is a straightforward chronological treatment; the second half a thematic treatment. This book established Clara as an important musical figure independent of her husband, the composer Robert Schumann. Her research in the early 1980s took her behind the Iron Curtain. She also collaborated with psychoanalyst Anna Burton, who had been analyzing Clara Schumann since 1968. The success of the book, which was translated into several languages, is credited with significantly increasing and re-evaluating female subjects in musicology. A revised 2nd edition was published in 2001. She was asked to review others' works about or inspired by Clara Schumann, and authored the New Grove Dictionary of Music's Clara Schumann entry.

Further areas of study included Fanny Hensel, Ernst Rudorff, Juliane Reichardt, Louise Reichardt, Helene Liebmann, Maria Carolina Wolf, and Rebecca Clarke.

In June 2019, a few months after her death, the Women's Philharmonic Advocacy established the Nancy B. Reich fund to support orchestras in the performance of major works by women composers.

She is the dedicatee of John C. Tibbetts' book Composers in the Movies: Studies in Musical Biography.

== Prizes and awards ==
- 1986: Deems-Taylor Award of the American Society of Composers, Authors and Publishers (ASCAP)
- 1996: Robert Schumann Prize of the City of Zwickau
- 2012: Women's Philharmonic Advocacy's AMY Award for Lifetime Achievement in Music Scholarship

== Essays and books ==
- Catalog of the works of William Sydeman; a machine-readable pilot project in information retrieval (1966, 2nd edition 1968) published by New York University Division of Music Education
- The Rudorff Collection, in Notes: The Quarterly Journal of the Music Library Association, volume 31 (1974), p. 247–261
- Louise Reichardt, in Ars musica, musica scientia. Festschrift Heinrich Hüschen zum fünfundsechzigsten Geburtstag am 2. März 1980, published by Detlef Altenburg, Cologne 1980, p. 369–377
- Die schöpferische Partnerschaft Clara und Robert Schumanns, in 9. Robert-Schumann-Tage, 1984, p. 43–52
- Clara Schumann and Johannes Brahms, in Brahms and his World, Princeton University Press, 1990, p. 37–47
- Die Lieder von Clara Schumann, in Brahms-Studien, volume 11 (1997), p. 97–106
- Clara Schumann: The Artist and the Woman, revised edition, Ithaca, N.Y.: Cornell University Press, 2001
- Robert Schumann's Music in New York City, 1848–1898, in Schumanniana nova. Festschrift Gerd Nauhaus zum 60. Geburtstag, Sinzig 2002, p. 569–595
- The Power of Class: Fanny Hensel and the Mendelssohn Family, in Women's Voices Across Musical Worlds, ed. Jane A. Bernstein, Northeastern University Press, 2004, p. 18-35.
