= Pygmalion (Benda) =

Opera by composer Georg Benda

- Monodrama by Georg Benda
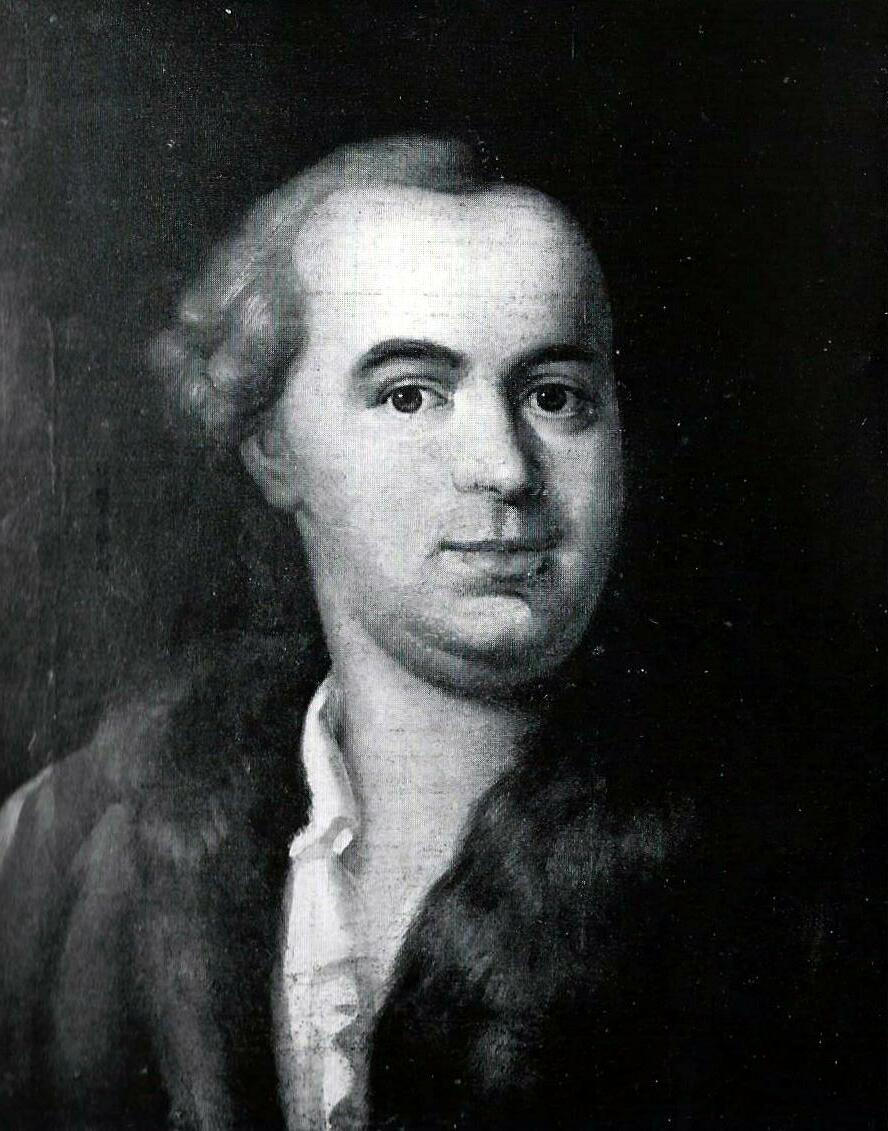
- Georg Benda in 1751
- Librettist: Friedrich Wilhelm Gotter
- Language: German
- Based on: Rousseau's Pygmalion
- Premiere: 20 September 1779; Ekhof-Theater, Gotha

Pygmalion is a monodrama in one act by composer Georg Benda with a German libretto by Friedrich Wilhelm Gotter. The work's first performance was at the Ekhof-Theater, the court theatre in Gotha, on 20 September 1779. Pygmalion was the fourth of the five theatrical collaborations of Benda and Gotter. Gotter based his text on Jean-Jacques Rousseau's 1762 play Pygmalion. As was typical of this genre of musical theater, Benda's melodrama has no singing roles. Two of the three characters, Pygmalion and Galatea, are spoken roles; the other, Venus, is silently acted on stage.

== Synopsis ==
Pygmalion, having renounced women, is in love with the statue he has made, his Galatea. Venus allows her to come to life, giving him final happiness.

== Discography ==
- Benda Melodramas: Ariadne auf Naxos/Pygmalion with conductor Christian Benda and the Prague Chamber Orchestra. Cast: Brigitte Quadlbauer (Ariadne) and Peter Uray (Pygmalion). Released in 1996 on the Naxos label.
