= Maud Cunitz =

Maud Cunitz (April 3, 1911 – July 22, 1987) was an English-born German soprano. After spending the first three years of her life in London, she moved to Nuremberg, Germany where she was trained as an opera singer and dancer. She had a career in European theaters from the 1930s into the early 1970s. She was particularly active at the Vienna State Opera and the Bavarian State Opera.

== Life and career ==
Maud Cunitz was born in London, England on April 3, 1911. She moved with her family to Nuremberg, Germany at the age of three. In Nuremberg she studied singing with soprano Stoja von Milinković, and was also trained as a dancer. In 1931 she joined the opera chorus at the Staatstheater Nürnberg. She made her debut in a leading role in 1934 at the Vereinigte Bühnen Gotha-Sondershausen in Thuringia, Germany; portraying Agathe in Der Freischütz. She also performed at the Landestheater Gotha in 1934. She was a resident soprano at first the Landestheater Coburg (1935-1938), and then Stadttheater Lübeck (1939-1940), Stadttheater Magdeburg (1939-1940), and the Staatsoper Stuttgart (1940-1944).

Cunitz becaome a member of the Bavarian State Opera in 1946; remaining there until her retirement in the early 1970s. She was concurrently active as a guest artist at a variety of European theatres; among them the Opernhaus Düsseldorf, La Monnaie, Paris Opera, and the Teatro dell'Opera di Roma. In 1943 she gave her first performance at the Salzburg Festival (SF) as the First Lady in Mozart's The Magic Flute. She also portrayed Donna Elvira in Don Giovanni at the SF in 1943 and 1946. She sang in several operas by Richard Strauss at the SF; including Zdenka in Arabella (1943), Semele in the world premiere of Die Liebe der Danae (1944), (Note: Die Liebe der Danae was given in a public dress rehearsal but the official premiere was canceled due to World War II events.) and Octavian in Der Rosenkavalier (1946).

In 1944 she made her debut at the Vienna State Opera (VSO) as Elisabeth in Richard Wagner's Tannhäuser where she was later a resident soprano from 1949 to 1949. She continued to appear as a recurring guest artist at the VSO until 1960; portraying such roles as the Empress in Die Frau ohne Schatten, Pamina in The Magic Flute, Sieglinde in Die Walküre, and the title role in Aida. In 1951 she portrayed the title role in Robert Schumann's Genoveva at the Maggio Musicale Fiorentino. In 1953 she had a great success in her debut at the Royal Opera House (ROH) in London as the Countess in Capriccio; also singing the title role in Arabella at the ROH that same year.

Some of the other roles in Cunitz's repertoire included Acanta in Eduard Künneke's Die große Sünderin, Alice Ford in Falstaff, Antonia in The Tales of Hoffman, Countess Almaviva in The Marriage of Figaro, Desdemona in Otello, Diemut in Feuersnot, Elsa in Lohengrin, Fiordiligi in Così fan tutte, Leonora in both Il trovatore and La forza del destino, Liu in Turandot, the Marshallin in Der Rosenkavalier, Micaëla in Carmen, Rosalinde in Die Fledermaus, and the title roles in Ariadne auf Naxos, Jenůfa, and Madame Butterfly. On the concert stage she appeared as the soprano soloist in Verdi's Requiem. Elizabeth Forbes stated she was "a reliable if not particularly colourful singer".

Cunitz was married to baritone Peter Albrecht. In her later life she lived in retirement in Marbella, Spain for a period before returning to Germany. She died in Munich on July 22, 1987.

== Recordings ==
Cunitz's voice is preserved on complete opera recordings made on the Telefunken, Decca Records, and HMV labels. For Decca she recorded the role of Agathe in Der Freischütz with the VSO and conductor Otto Ackermann in 1951. She also recorded a highlights version of The Gypsy Baron with the Bavarian Radio Symphony Orchestra which was released as a LP by Mercury Records in 1951. She recorded the role of Marie/Marietta in Die tote Stadt with the Bayerischer Rundfunk in 1952.

For HMV Cunitz recorded the role of Elsa in Lohengrin in 1954 with the North German Radio Symphony Orchestra. A 1958 live recording of her performances as Diemut in Feuersnot at the Bavarian State Opera was released on disc in 1999 on the Orfeo D'Or label.

== Note and references ==
=== Bibliography ===
- Kennedy, Michael; Kennedy, Joyce; Rutherford-Johnson, Tim, eds. (2013). "Cunitz, Maud". The Oxford Dictionary of Music. Oxford University Press. ISBN 9780199578542.
- Kutsch, K. J.; Riemens, Leo (2003). "Cunitz, Maud". In Rost, Hansjörg (ed.). Grosses Sängerlexikon. K. G. Saur Verlag. ISBN 9783598440885.
- Sackville-West, Edward; Shawe-Taylor, Desmond (1953). The Record Year: A Guide to the Year's Gramophone Records, Including a Complete Guide to Long Playing Records. Collins.
