= Die Geisterinsel (Reichardt) =

1798 German opera by J. F. Reichardt

Die Geisterinsel is a singspiel in 3 acts by Johann Friedrich Reichardt to a libretto by Friedrich Wilhelm Gotter based on The Tempest by William Shakespeare.

The libretto by Gotter, after an earlier version by his friend Friedrich von Einsiedel, had already been hailed as a masterpiece by Goethe and first set by Friedrich Fleischmann in May 1798 for the Ducal Court Theatre in Weimar. Goethe also promoted Fleischmann's setting, but the opera was not a success. The years 1798 to 1799 saw six more operas based on The Tempest, of which Reichardt's, commissioned by August Wilhelm Iffland for the Nationaltheater, Berlin, was both the most successful and the most successful of Reichardt's operas as a whole. It was premiered 6 July 1798.
