= List of works for the stage by Johann Friedrich Reichardt =

This is a list of works for the stage by Johann Friedrich Reichardt (1752–1814).

== List ==
Title	Genre	Subdivisions	Libretto	Première date	Place, theatre
Hänschen und Gretchen	Operette	1 act	Johann Christoph Bock after Michel-Jean Sedaine's Rose et Colas	composed 1771–72, unperformed	
Amors Guckkasten	Operette	1 act	Johann Benjamin Michaelis	composed 1772, unperformed	
Le feste galanti (La gioja dopo il duolo, ò Le feste superbe)	opera seria	3 acts	Leopoldo de Villati after Joseph-François Duché de Vancy	1775	Potsdam, Hof
Der Holzhauer, oder Die drei Wünsche	komische Oper	1 act	Friedrich Wilhelm Gotter and J. G. von Wulff, after Nicolas Castet and Jean-François Guichard's Le bûcheron	composed circa 1775, unperformed	
Cephalus und Prokris	Melodram	1 act	Karl Wilhelm Ramler	7 July 1777	Hamburg, Theater am Gänsemarkt
Ino	musikalisches Drama	1 act	Johann Christian Brandes	4 August 1779	Leipzig
Liebe nur beglückt	Schauspiel mit Zwischenmusik und Gesang	3 acts	Reichardt	autumn 1781	Dessau, Hof
Tamerlan	tragédie lyrique	4 acts	Étienne Morel de Chédeville, after Voltaire's L'orphelin de la Chine	16 October 1786	Berlin, Königliche Opernhaus
Panthée	tragédie lyrique	4 acts	Giovanni Berquin	1786	Paris, Opéra
Andromeda	opera seria	3 acts	Antonio de' Filistri da Caramondani	11 January 1788	Berlin, Königliche Opernhaus
Orpheus (composed with Bertoni)		3 acts	Ranieri de' Calzabigi	31 January 1788	Berlin, Königliche Opernhaus
Protesilao (Act 1 only; Act 2 by Naumnann)	opera seria	2 acts	Gaetano Sertor	26 January 1789	Berlin, Königliche Opernhaus
Claudine von Villa Bella	Singspiel	3 acts	Johann Wolfgang von Goethe	29 July 1789	Charlottenburg, Schloss
Brenno	opera seria	3 acts	Antonio de' Filistri da Caramondani	16 October 1789	Berlin, Königliche Opernhaus
L'Olimpiade	dramma per musica	3 acts	Metastasio	2 October 1791	Berlin, Königliche Opernhaus
Lila	Singspiel		Johann Wolfgang von Goethe	1791, music lost	
Erwin und Elmire	Singspiel	2 acts	Johann Wolfgang von Goethe after Oliver Goldsmith	early 1793 (concert performance)	Berlin
Macbeth	tragedy	3 acts	Gottfried August Bürger after William Shakespeare	spring 1795	Munich, Hoftheater
Die Geisterinsel	Singspiel	3 acts	Johann Friedrich Wilhelm Gotter after The Tempest by William Shakespeare	6 July 1798	Berlin, Nationaltheater
Lieb' und Treue (Lieb' und Frieden)	Liederspiel	1 act	Reichardt	31 March 1800	Berlin, Nationaltheater
Der Jubel, oder Juchhei	Liederspiel	1 act	Reichardt	21 June 1800	Berlin, Nationaltheater
Rosmonda	tragedia per musica	3 acts	Antonio de' Filistri da Caramondani	6 February 1801	Berlin, Nationaltheater
Jery und Bätely	Singspiel	1 act	Johann Wolfgang von Goethe	30 March 1801	Berlin, Nationaltheater
Das Zauberschloss	Singspiel	3 acts	August von Kotzebue	2 January 1802	Berlin, Nationaltheater
Herkules Tod	Melodram	1 act	after Sophocles	10 April 1802	Berlin, Nationaltheater
Kunst und Liebe	Liederspiel	1 act	Reichardt	30 November 1807	Berlin, Nationaltheater
L’heureux naufrage	comedy	1 act		autumn 1808	Kassel, Hof
Bradamante		4 acts	Heinrich Joseph von Collin after Ludovico Ariosto	3 February 1809	Vienna
Der Taucher	Singspiel	2 acts	Samuel Gottlieb Bürde, after Friedrich Schiller	18 March 1811	Berlin, Nationaltheater
