= Romeo und Julie =

1776 opera by Georg Benda based on Romeo and Juliet

- Singspiel by Georg Benda
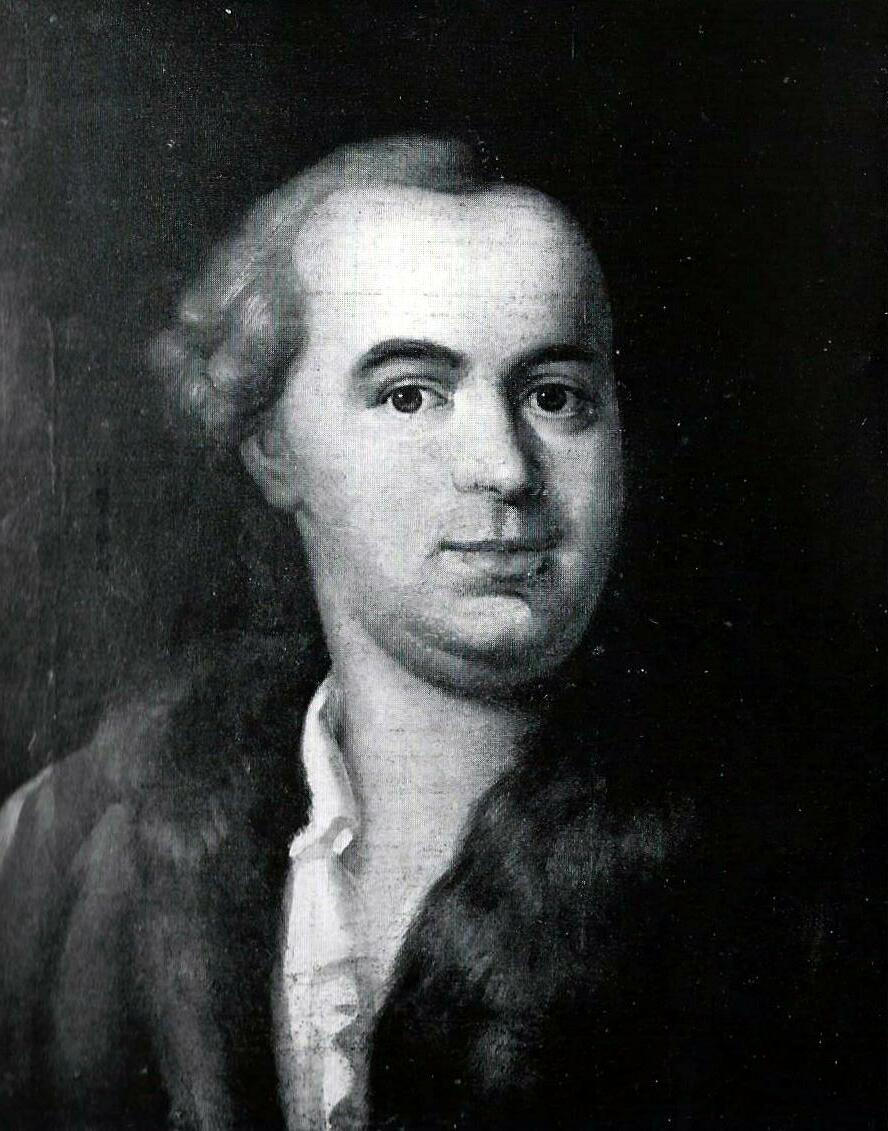
- Georg Benda in 1751
- Librettist: Friedrich Wilhelm Gotter
- Language: German
- Based on: Romeo and Juliet by Shakespeare
- Premiere: 25 September 1776; Ekhof Theatre, Gotha

Romeo und Julie is a singspiel in three acts by composer Georg Benda. The opera has a German libretto by Friedrich Wilhelm Gotter that is based upon Christian Felix Weiße's translation of Shakespeare's Romeo and Juliet.

Gotter's libretto eliminates many of Shakespeare's characters and most of the original play's comedic elements. It does, however, adhere to unities of time and place. Gotter's text also makes Julie the strongest and most important character in the opera, which is further reflected in Benda's score. Gotter also gave his version of Romeo and Juliet a happy ending, in accordance with operatic tradition at that time.

== Performance history ==
The opera was first performed on 25 September 1776 at the Ekhof Theatre in the Friedenstein Palace, Gotha. The UK première was given in 2007 by Bampton Classical Opera, in English.

== Roles ==
Roles, voice types
Role	Voice type
Capellet, a Veronan	tenor
Julie, the daughter of Capellet	soprano
Romeo Montecchi, the secret lover of Julie	tenor
Francesco, Romeo's friend	speaking role
Laura, a close friend of Julie	soprano
Pater Lorenzo, a chaplain in the Capellet's house	speaking role
a female speaking part, mourners, servants, messengers

== Synopsis ==
Deep rivalry and animosity exists between the Montagues and the Capulets, two noble families of Verona. Romeo Montague sneaks into the Capulet's palace to attend their masked ball in disguise. He meets Julie Capulet and the two fall in love. They decide to get married in the hopes that it will bring the family feud to an end. Friar Laurence, the Capulet family chaplain, marries them in secret. Soon after the wedding a street brawl results in the murder of Romeo's friend Mercutio. Angry, Romeo attacks and kills his murderer, Tybalt Capulet who is Julie's cousin. Romeo is banished to Mantua by the Duke of Verona.

=== Act 1 ===
Midnight in Julie's chambers at the Capulet palace

Julie is impatiently awaiting for Romeo to meet her in her rooms. She is fearful that he may have already left for exile without seeing her. Julie's friend, Laura, waits with her trying to provide comfort. Julie worries about the motives of her aunt Camilla, whom she suspects is working against Romeo. Julie unkindly suggests that Laura may also be untrustworthy. Laura defends herself and Julie retracts. Romeo arrives soon after telling Julie he must leave for Mantua soon. Julie is unhappy at the situation and has premonitions of death. Romeo tells her to have hope, but Julie is inconsolable and says it would be better for them to commit suicide together than be apart. Romeo calms her and the arrival of dawn forces them to part.

=== Act 2 ===
Dawn in Julie's chambers at the Capulet palace

Laura watches over Julie as she sleeps. Julie's father, Capulet, enters and he orders Laura to wake Julie up and then leave. He is suspicious that Julie's emotional behavior may not be over her cousin's death but Romeo's departure and is fearful that the two may be in love. Capulet informs his daughter that he has arranged her to marry Count Paris. Julie is dismayed and refuses to marry Paris outright. Enraged, Capulet threatens to disown her.

Laura returns and warns her of a plot hatched by Camilla which could result in her incarceration and forced marriage. Friar Laurence arrives and suggests a solution to Julie's dilemma: a sleeping draught will make her appear dead and, once laid in the family vault, Romeo will be able to rescue her and take her away forever. Left alone, Julie has visions of the horrors of the tomb and of Tybalt's vengeful ghost. Nevertheless, for Romeo's sake, she drinks Laurence's potion.

=== Act 3 ===
The Capulet Mausoleum

The Capulet Family mourns over the body of Julie and she is laid in the mausoleum close to the corpse of Tybalt. Meanwhile, Romeo is greeted by his servant Francesco who has followed him on the road to Mantua to tell him of Julie's death. Romeo resolves to enter the tomb to bid a final farewell to his bride, and then to kill himself. As he is about to stab himself, Julie revives and they sing a rapturous duet of joy. They are overheard by Laurence, who warns them to stay hidden in the tomb. He persuades Capulet to swear that he would accept Romeo Montague as his son-in-law if only his daughter could be restored to life. Immediately the fiction is revealed to be truth. True to his word, Capulet embraces Romeo amidst general rejoicing.

== Discography ==
- Romeo und Julie with conductor Hermann Breuer and the Thüringen Philharmonie Gotha-Eisenach. Cast includes: Claudia Taha (Julie), Joachim Keuper (Romeo), Andreas Näck (Capulet), Marisca Mulder (Laura), Theo Pfeifer (Francesco and Pater Lorenzo), and the Gotha Concert Choir. Released September 1, 1998.
