= Ekhof-Theater =

Theatre in Friedenstein Palace in Gotha, Germany

- View to the stage
- Interactive map of Ekhof-Theater
- Location: Gotha, Thuringia, Germany
- Coordinates: 50°56′42″N 10°42′15″E
- Capacity: 165

Construction
- Opened: 1683

The Ekhof-Theater in Gotha, Thuringia, Germany, is one of the oldest Baroque theatres, with working stage machinery from the 17th century, which is still controlled manually. It is located in the western tower of Schloss Friedenstein. Directed by Conrad Ekhof from 1775, it was an early theatre with an ensemble of paid actors and access for citizens to performances. It is used for the Ekhof-Festival of Baroque plays and operas.

== History ==
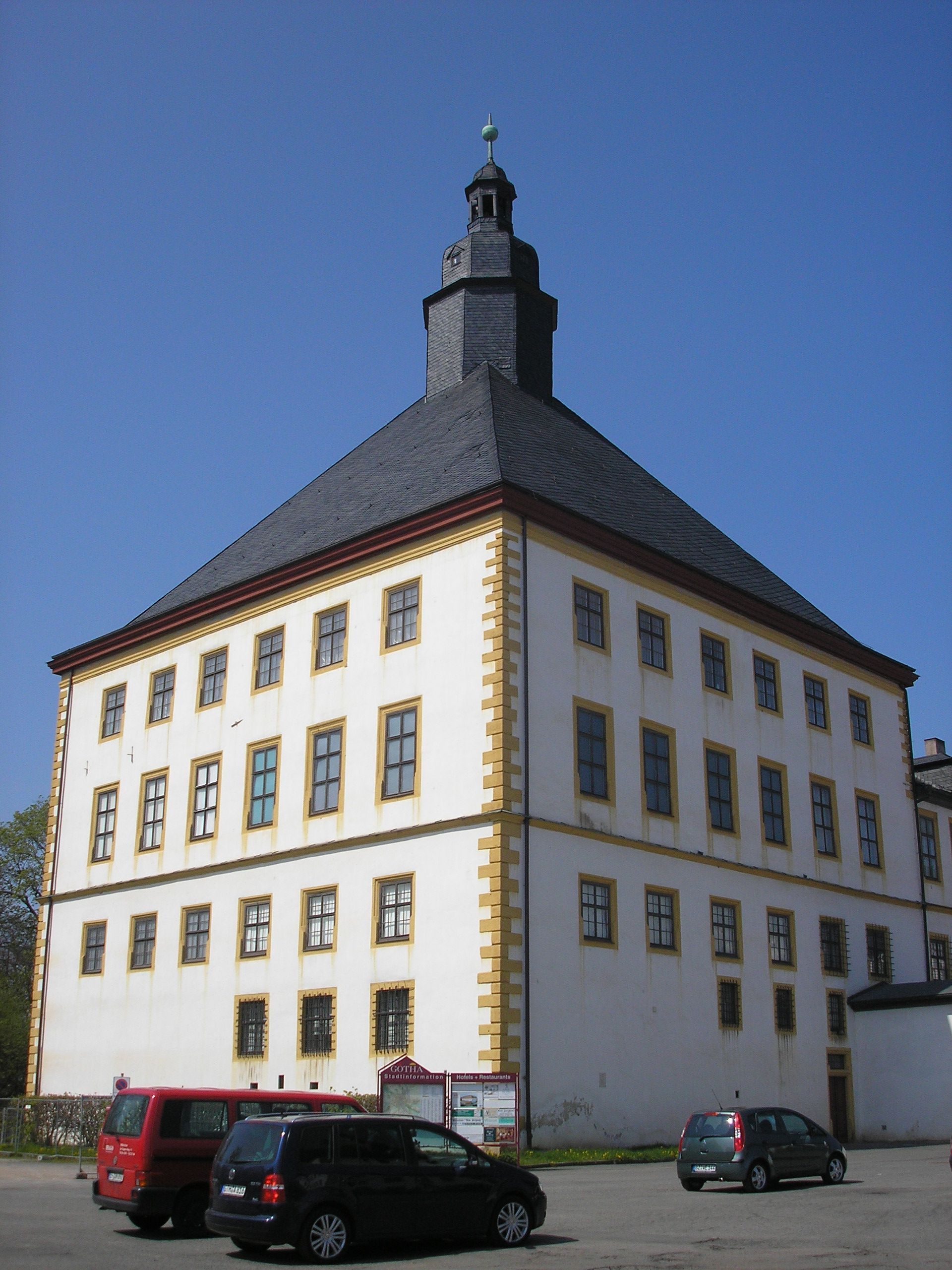
The theatre in the tower

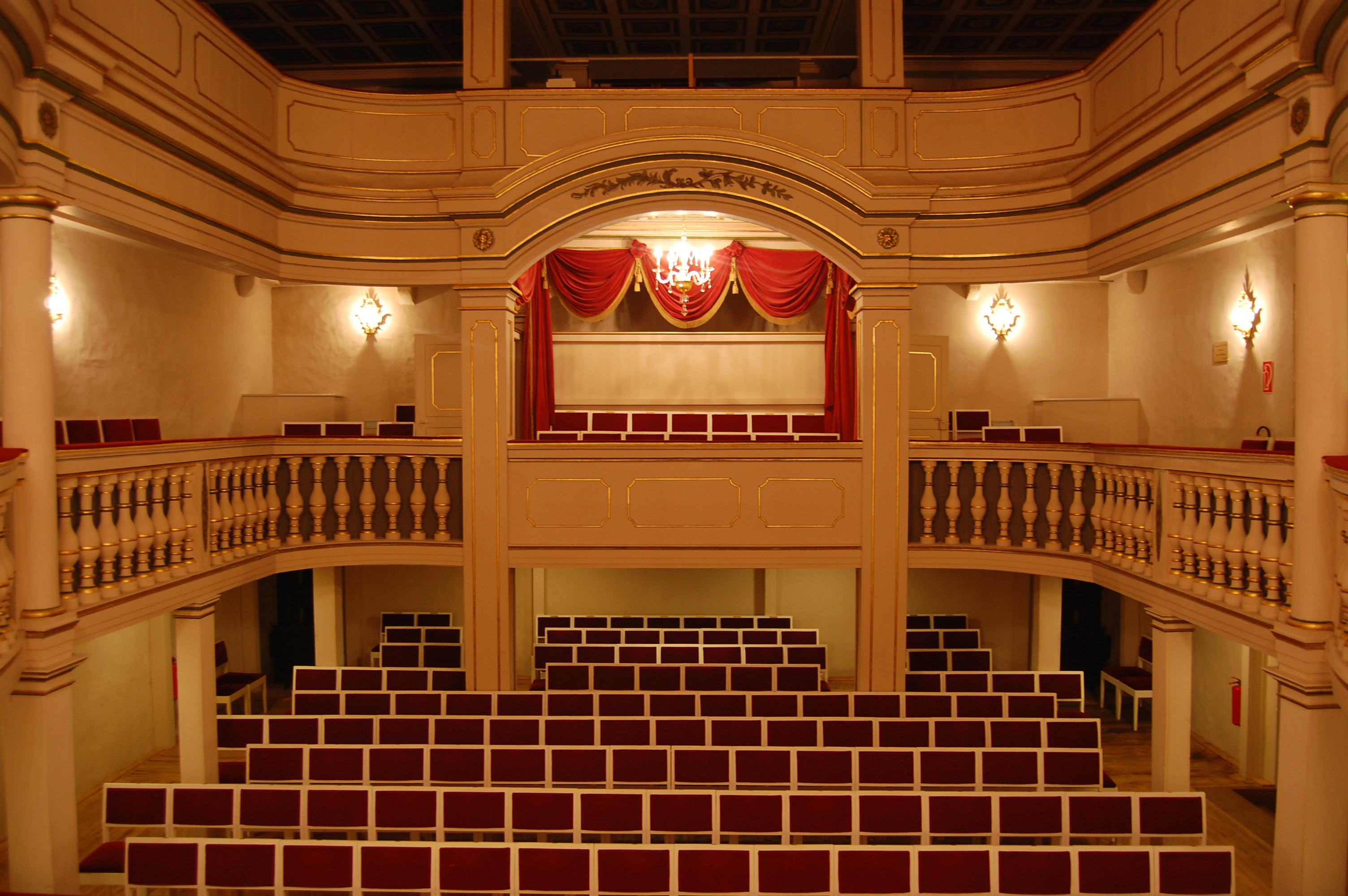
The hall

The theatre was established as a court theatre for Frederick I of Saxe-Gotha-Altenburg in several stages between 1681 and 1683, installed in the former hall for ball games of Schloss Friedenstein. The first actors were members of the noble family and higher civil servants of the court, with the intention to teach the young family members to move freely in front of an audience and to expose them to classical literature. The stage had modern technical equipment based on designs by Giacomo Torelli.

From 1775, under Ernest II of Saxe-Gotha-Altenburg, the theatre had its own ensemble, making it one of the first court theatres. The actors were engaged and paid, and even a pension fund was established, which was unusual at the time. The director was Conrad Ekhof, until 1778, who presented spectacular productions, which made the theatre a centre of the Deutsche Theaterlandschaft. They performed plays by Shakespeare, Goldoni, Molière, Voltaire, Diderot, Lessing, Gotter and Brandes. Paying citizens could then attend the performances. One of the principal actors was August Wilhelm Iffland. The singspiel Romeo und Julie by the court composer Georg Benda had its world premiere at the theatre on 25 September 1776.

Wellbaum under the stage

With the building of a municipal theatre, Neues Theater, completed in 1840, the court theatre was no longer used for public performances. It was restored to its original state from 1966 to 1968.

The theatre is now mostly a museum, open to visitors and also part of tours of the Schloss. In 1996, the Ekhof-Festival was established to present plays and operas from the 17th and 18th centuries in historic productions, and also offers related readings and concerts. It has been run by the Stiftung Schloss Friedenstein Gotha since 2010. The stage is also used for the Pfingstfestival of the Thüringen Philharmonie Gotha-Eisenach and for the "Woche der historischen Theater", a week of historic theatre. The hall seats 165 spectators, while the second tier is closed to the public.

250 years after its premiere, Benda's Romeo und Julie was performed in September 2026, with Michael Hofstetter conducting the Thüringen Philharmonie.

== Stage machinery ==
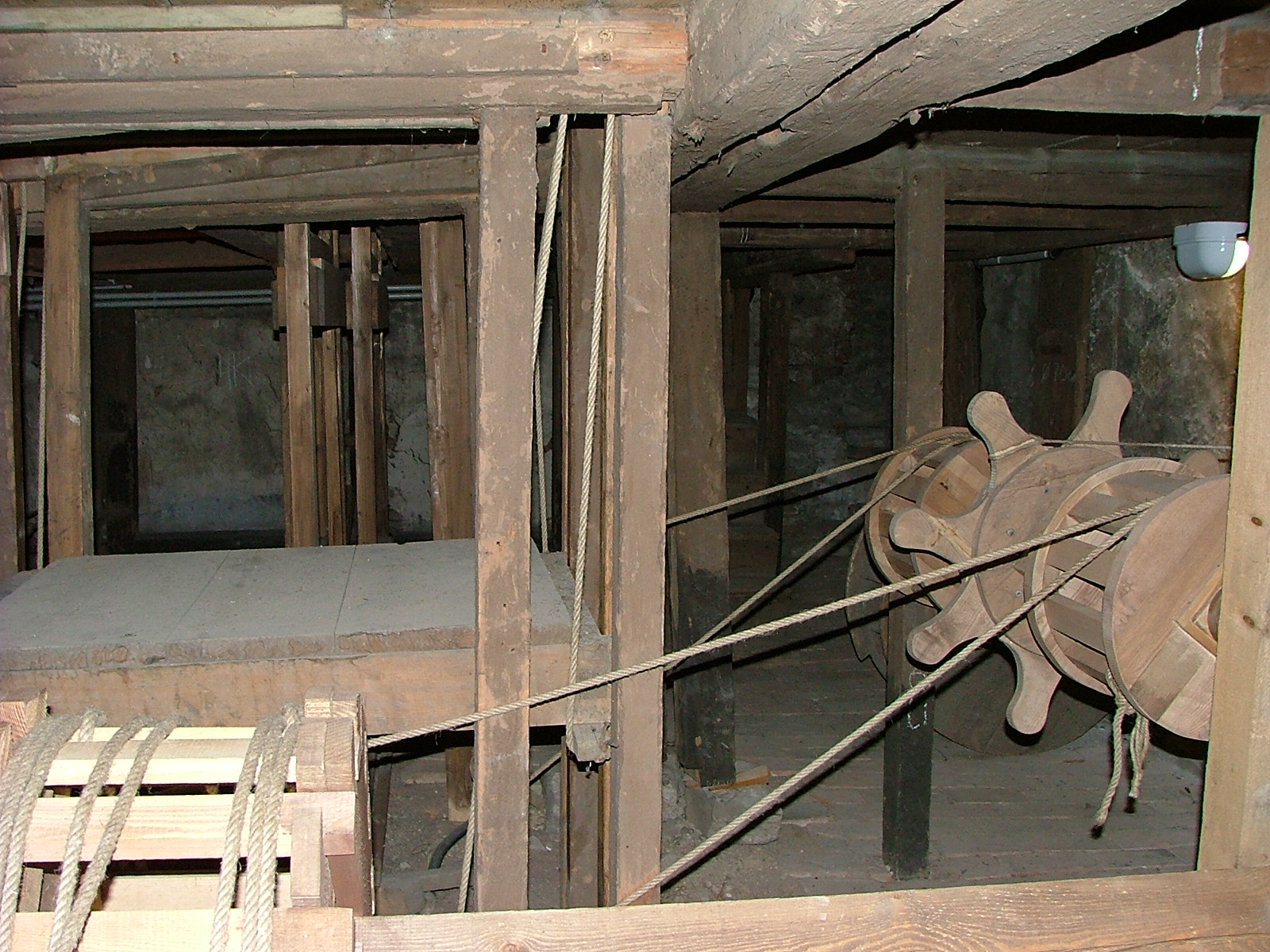
So-called Hamletversenkung

The Ekhof-Theater is one of the oldest Baroque theatres, with working stage machinery from the 17th century, which is still controlled manually. It has a stage with a Kulissenbühne, the most popular kind of stage during the Baroque period. It is a mechanism for fast changes of the scene, first designed by Giacomo Torelli in 1641 and used at the Ekhof-Theater from 1681. On both sides of the stage are six aisles, each with three set wagons below the stage that can move hanging scenic images. The wagons are moved by ropes via three fly bars (Wellbäume) and corresponding pulleys in the understage area. A system of rope hoists allows the soffits, which complement the scene from above, as well as the rear backdrop, to be lowered into place and pulled out again. This makes it possible to operate all the scenery synchronously, enabling rapid scene changes involving up to three sets whilst the curtain is open. Nine to twelve people are required for a scenery change. The stage floor also features two intact trapdoors through which people and props could be made to disappear downwards and reappear. A flying apparatus made it possible to make people float across the stage, but it is no longer in operation. To create both acoustic and visual effects, indispensable for a Baroque play, there was a series of sophisticated mechanisms, of which the reconstructed wind and thunder machines are still in use.
