= Franz Gareis =

German painter

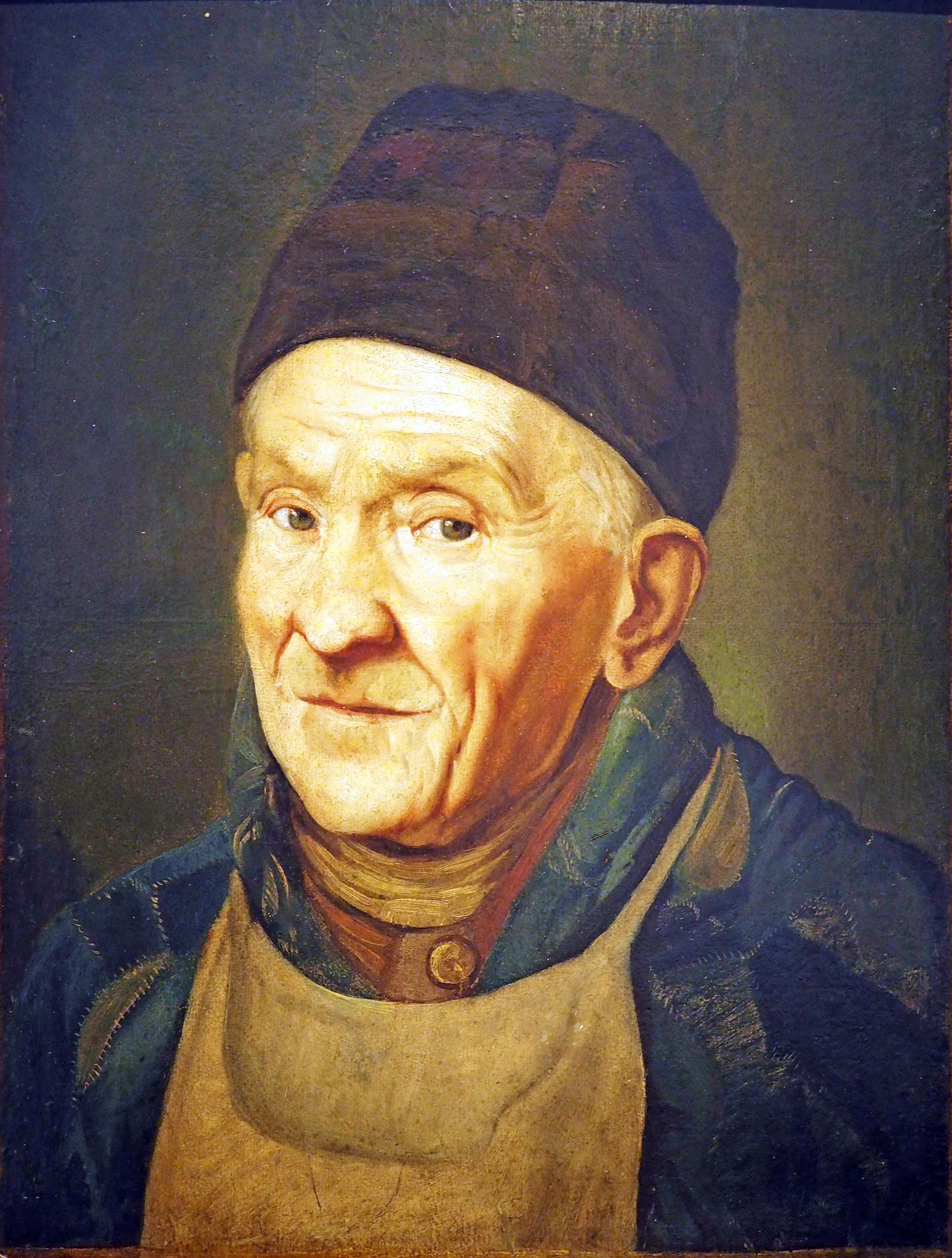
Portrait of the Artist's Father

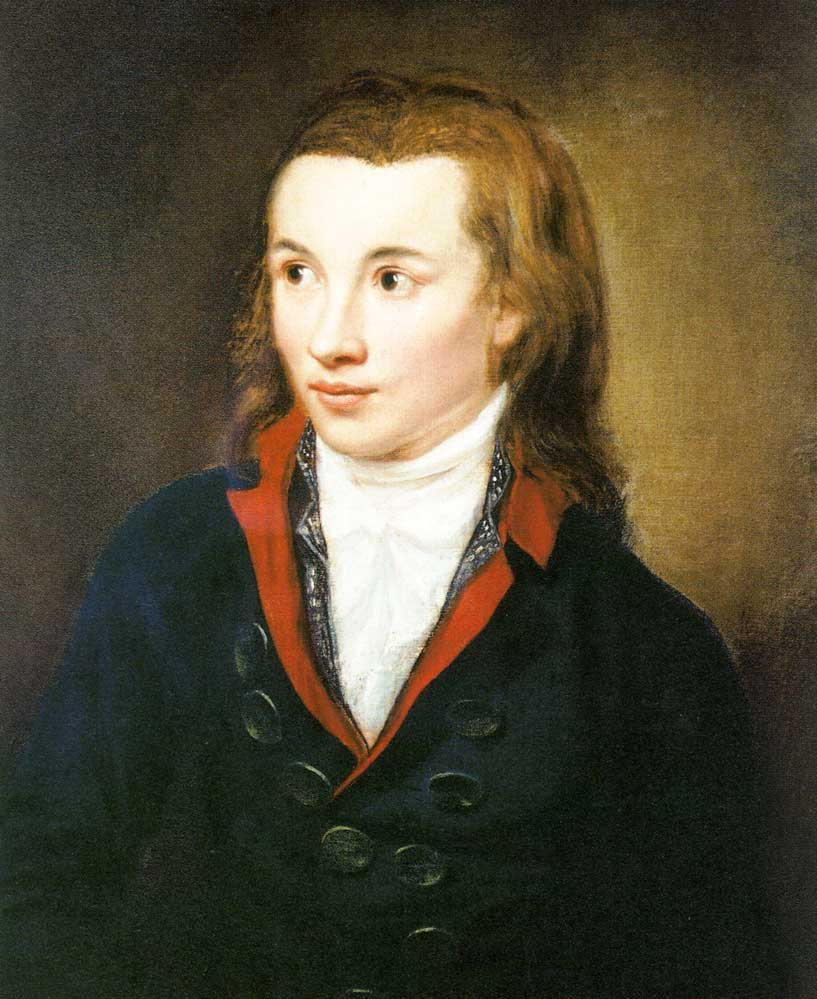
Portrait of the Poet, Novalis

Johann Franz Peter Paul Gareis (28 June 1775 – 31 May 1803) was a German portrait painter and illustrator.

== Life and work ==
He was born in Ostritz. At the age of sixteen, he went to Dresden to inquire about the possibility of being admitted to the Academy of Fine Arts. After some preparatory studies and submissions, he became a student of the academy's Director, Giovanni Battista Casanova, a brother of the famous adventurer, Giacomo Casanova. His first exhibit at the academy, in 1794, drew much positive attention.

He completed his work there shortly after and went on a study trip to Danzig, Narva and Memel, then back through Berlin to Dresden. In 1796, he was awarded an annual government pension of 100 Thalers. From 1798, he moved frequently, to Halle (1798), Leipzig (1799), Vienna (1799), Berlin (1800), Paris (1801) and finally to Rome (1803), painting numerous portraits all along the way. Shortly after arriving in Rome, however, he fell ill with typhus and died. He was interred near the Pyramid of Cestius at the Protestant Cemetery.

At the time of his death, he was engaged to the singer and composer, Louise Reichardt; daughter of the composer, Johann Friedrich Reichardt.

His works include an altarpiece at the church in Reichenau (1798) and the canvas "Orpheus – Lament Before the God of the Underworld", which he had sent to Dresden for an exhibition, shortly before his death. The largest collection of his works is at the Kulturhistorisches Museum Görlitz. A sketch book from his trip to Russia is preserved at the Kupferstichkabinett Dresden.
