= Louise Reichardt =

German composer and choral conductor

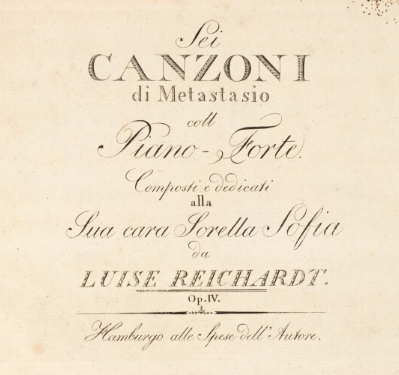
L(o)uise Caroline Reichardt's music

Louise Reichardt or Luise Reichardt (11 April 1779 – 17 November 1826) was a German composer and choral conductor. Her German songs, or Lieder, were written in an accessible style akin to folk music and were popular. Louise Reichard was known for composing in the style of “romantic songs,” which are based on poetic settings. Additionally, she was influential in the musical life of Hamburg, Germany, where she lived from 1809.

== Biography ==
=== Early life ===
She was born in Berlin. She was the daughter of composers Juliane Reichardt (1752–1783) and Johann Friedrich Reichardt (1752–1814) and the granddaughter of Franz Benda (1709–1786). Her grandfather and father were, respectively, Konzertmeister and Kapellmeister at the court of Frederick the Great. After Juliane Reichardt died when Louise was only four years old, the family moved from Berlin to Halle. Louise Reichardt took music lessons from her father, and in 1800 four of her songs were published in a collection of his songs. The Reichardt family entertained literary figures such as Goethe, Ludwig Tieck, Novalis, Clemens Brentano, and Phillip Ludwig Achim von Arnim. She befriended many of these literary figures, and would later use von Arnim's poetry in a collection of twelve songs. She also assisted in writing music for a large collection of 380 volumes, called The Hebbe Collection. It comprises 890 titles worth of piano music that many composers, including Reichardt, contributed to. Wolfgang Amadeus Mozart and Ludwig van Beethoven also contributed greatly to the collection.

=== Hamburg ===
In 1809 she moved to Hamburg, where she studied with Johann Frederich Clasing. She taught music, instructed choruses, and composed. She did not rely on royalty or wealthy patrons to hear her music. Nor did she rely on her family for financial stability. During her time in Hamburg, from 1809 until 1826, she composed the majority of her Lieder. She reached the public by writing in an easily accessible, folksy style, combining memorable melodies with simple piano accompaniments.

Reichardt was also active as a choral conductor and established a Gesangverein choral society in Hamburg. She would help the choir practice for concerts through her conducting. However, due to the prevailing sexism of the times, she was never allowed to conduct them in public. "Despite these gender restrictions, Reichardt strongly influenced musical life in Hamburg through her composing, teaching, and behind-the-scenes conducting." She also went on to translate the Latin works of Hasse and Graun into German.

=== Personal life ===
Reichardt’s husband-to-be, the writer Friedrich August Eschen, suddenly died before their wedding. Her second husband-to-be, the painter Franz Gareis, also died before their wedding. From then on, Reichardt dedicated herself to her students in Hamburg, and toward the end of her life, she became intensely religious, composing two books of sacred songs.

== Works ==
Individual songs by Reichardt include:

- Giusto Amor
- Notturno
- Vanne felice rio (Metastasio) (1806)
- Bergmannslied (Novalis)
- Heimweh (attributed to Wetzel)
- Die Blume der Blumen (Runge)
- Duettino (1802) (Brentano) (two tenors)
- From Des Knaben Wunderhorn: Hier liegt ein Spielmann begraben
- Betteley der Vögel
- The Hebbe Collection

Contemporary collected publications of Reichardt include:

- Zwölf deutsche Lieder von Johann Freidrich Reichardt und dessen Tochter Luise Reichardt (Twelve German songs by Johann Freidrich Reichardt and his daughter, Luise Reichardt) (Zerbst: C. C. Menzel, 1800)
- XII Deutsche und italiänische romantische Gesänge (Twelve German and Italian Romantic Songs) (Berlin: Realschul-Buchhandlung, 1806), Decidated to Anna Amalia. (Song 1: "Frühlingslied")
- Zwoelf Gesänge mit Begleitung des Piano-Forte (Twelve Songs with Piano Accompaniment), Op. 3 (Hamburg: Böhme, [1811]), dedicated to Louise Sillem. (Song 1: "Frühlingsblumen")
- Sechs Lieder von Novalis mit Begleitung des Piano-Forte (Six Novalis songs with Piano Accompaniment), Op. 4 (Hamburg: Böhme, [1819]). (Song 1: "Sehnsucht nach dem Vaterlande")
- Zwölf Gesänge mit Begleitung des Piano-Forte (Twelve Songs with Piano Accompaniment), [no opus] (Hamburg: Böhme [1820]), dedicated to her sister Friederika. (Song 1: "Erinnrung am Bach")

As arranger:

- Christliche Liebliche Lieder Gesammlet und herausgegeben von Louise Reichardt (Hamburg: A. Cranz, [c. 1820]) for one to four voices. (Song 1: Schifferlied)

Later editions:

- Luise Reichardt: Ausgewählte Lieder (Selected Songs), ed. Gerty Rheinhardt (Munich, 1922), with introduction, biography, and works list. (Song 1: Kriegslied des Mays)
- Louise Reichardt: Sechs geistliche Lieder (Six Sacred Songs), for treble chorus (SSAA) with piano accompaniment, ed. Carolyn Raney (New York: Broude Bros, 1979)
- Louise Reichardt: Songs, ed. Nancy B. Reich (New York, 1981)

== Reception ==
Reichart's life and music were of interest continually throughout the nineteenth century. She was the subject of a full-monograph biography (with collected writings) by 1858 with a second edition in 1865. Her most notable scholar in the twentieth century was Nancy B. Reich.
