= Jay Sydeman =

American composer (1928–2021)

William Jay Sydeman (May 8, 1928 – May 27, 2021) was a prolific American composer. He was born in New York. He studied at Duke University, and received a B.S. degree in 1955 from the Mannes School of Music, having studied with Felix Salzer, Roy Travis, and Roger Sessions. He received his master's in music from the Hartt School in 1958, studying under Arnold Franchetti and Goffredo Petrassi. From 1959 to 1970 he joined the composition faculty at his alma mater Mannes School of Music.

In 1951 he married Hope Millholland, a pianist and fellow student at Mannes.

Winning early acclaim for his avant-garde music (principally published by C. F. Peters), he felt trapped by the prevailing orthodoxies and moved to California in 1970, beginning a period of wandering during which he also studied Buddhism and Anthroposophy. He joined ASCAP in 1975. From 1980 to 1982 he taught at Rudolph Steiner College in Fair Oaks. In 1981 he settled in Sacramento and resumed composition at his former prolific rate, having newly embraced a neotonal musical language. He later moved to Mendocino.

In 1966, his catalog (nearly 75 works by this date) was edited by Nancy B. Reich and published as an early exercise in machine-readable catalogs. A 2nd edition, published by NYU Department of Music Education, was released in 1968. 35 years later she would write his entry for Grove Dictionary of Music.

His music was commissioned from many leading institutions and performers. He won awards from the Boston Symphony Orchestra, the Pacifica Foundation, and the National Institutes of Arts and Letters.

== Selected works ==
Opera

- Aria da Capo
- The Odyssey

Orchestral

- Mosey'n Along for string orchestra with oboe
- Lyric Piece for chamber orchestra
- Miniatures
- Orchestral Abstractions
- Study No. 1 (1959)
- Study No. 2
- Study No. 3 (1965), premiered by the Boston Symphony Orchestra
- Study No. 4 "The 4 Seasons"
- In Memoriam: J. F. Kennedy for narrator and orchestra (1966)
- Texture Studies (1969)
- Oecumenicus

Band

- Movements for concert band
- Five Movements for wind symphony

Concertante

- Largo for cello and string orchestra (1959)
- Concert Piece for horn and string orchestra
- Concertino for oboe, piano and string orchestra (1967)
- Concerto da Camera [No. 1] for solo violin, flute, clarinet, bassoon, horn, viola and cello (1959)
- Concerto da Camera No. 2 for solo violin, oboe, clarinet, viola and cello (1960), premiered at the 92nd Street Y
- Concerto da Camera No. 3 for solo violin, winds and percussion (1965)
- Concerto da Camera for viola and chamber ensemble (1968)
- Concerto for Piano Four Hands (1965), premiered by the Chorale Symphony Society in New York's Town Hall.
- Music for viola, winds and percussion (1971)
- Reflections for violin, cello and string orchestra

Chamber music

- String Quartet No. 2 (1954)
- Quintet No. 1 for woodwinds (1955)
- Sonata for violin and piano (1955)
- Music for brass ensemble and percussion (1955)
- Quartet for violin, clarinet, cello and piano (1955)
- Quartet for violin, clarinet, trumpet and double bass (1955)
- Music for 10 woodwinds (1956)
- Study for 2 flutes and piano (1956)
- Seven Movements for Septet (1958), premiered at Carnegie Recital Hall
- Tower Music for brass quintet (1959)
- Duo for cello and piano (1963)
- Duo for violin and piano (1963)
- Trio for flute, double bass and percussion (1963)
- Duo for trumpet and percussion (1965)
- The Affections, suite for trumpet and piano (1965), written for and premiered by his student Charles Morrow.
- Sonata for violin solo (1966)
- Duo for viola and harpsichord (or piano) (1967)
- Sonata for cello solo (1967)
- Trio for bassoon, bass clarinet and piano (1968)
- Duo for xylophone and double bass (1969)
- Duo for trumpet and amplified double bass (1969)
- Duo for horn and piano (1970)
- Music for xylophone solo (1975)
- Trio for viola, cello and piano (1985)
- Auld Lang Sydeman for violin and viola
- Duo for flute and viola
- Duo [No. 1] for violin and viola
- Duo No. 2 for violin and viola
- A New Wedding March for violin and viola
- Prelude for viola and cello
- Sonata for viola and piano
- Song for double bass and piano
- Trio for 3 violas
- Variations for viola and bassoon

Piano

- Variations (1958)
- Sonata (1962), commissioned by and premiered at Carnegie Recital Hall by his Mannes College colleague Jack Chaikin.

Choral

- Prometheus, cantata for soloist, chorus and orchestra (1957)
- Lament of Electra for alto solo, large chorus and chamber orchestra

Vocal

- The Place of Blue Flowers for narrator and viola
- Songs on Elizabethan Texts for soprano and flute
- 3 Songs after Emily Dickinson for soprano and cello
- Jabberwocky for soprano, flute and cello
- Five Short Songs for soprano and piano (1978)
- 4 Japanese Songs for soprano and 2 violins
- Cradle Song for mezzo-soprano and piano
- Japanese Love Poems for mezzo-soprano and piano
- La Jour de la Mère for mezzo-soprano and piano
- Moon Over Mountain for mezzo-soprano and piano
- The Fence for mezzo-soprano and piano
- The Foundation Stone for mezzo-soprano and piano
- I Sing the Praises for mezzo-soprano and piano
- A Prayer for alto, viola and piano
- Malediction for tenor, string quartet and tape (1970). Commissioned by the Chamber Music Society of Lincoln Center, premiered at Tully Hall in 1971. Inspired by Tristam Shandy.
- It Seems for baritone and piano
- Upon Julia's Clothes for baritone and piano
- A Spider for baritone and piano
- 4 Psalms for bass and piano
  Other
  - Fantasy Piece for Harpsichord and Tape (1965)
  - Score to the 1985 TV film Comet Halley

== Bibliography ==
- ASCAP. ASCAP Biographical Dictionary, 4th ed. Jaques Cattell Press, R.R. Bowker Company, 1980, p. 496, ISBN 0-8352-1283-1, (entire page 496, just Sydeman entry, copyright page)
- Vinton, John ed. Dictionary of Contemporary Music, E.P. Dutton & Co., 1974, p. 725-726, ISBN 0-525-09125-4
