= Anna von Schaden =

Austrian composer and pianist (1763–1834)

Anna Leopoldine Theresia Elisabetha Nanette von Stadler von Pranck von Schaden (January 1763 – January 1834) was an Austrian composer and pianist who was known for her improvisational skills but left only three written compositions for piano. She published and performed under the names Anna von Schaden and Nanette von Schaden.

Von Schaden’s parents were Salzburg Court War Council Director Leopold Graf Pranck and Walburga Stadler. Because her parents were unmarried, Schaden used the name “von Stadler von Pranck.” In 1774, she moved into the household of Imperial Court Councilor Friedrich von Mauchart. She studied music with Franz Ignaz von Beecke, and in 1779 she married the Wallerstein privy councilor Joseph Wilhelm von Schaden. They had two daughters, Maria Anna Antonia and Josepha Amalia.

The von Schadens moved to the court of Oettingen-Wallerstein, where von Schaden met court musician Antonio Rosetti, who later helped orchestrate her two piano concerti. In 1781 she began receiving an annual pension of 200 guilders for her musical contributions at court, including her 1786 performance of a piano concerto by Beecke. Von Schaden also became friends with piano maker Nanette Streicher. They played four hand piano works and performed together.

In 1787, the von Schadens moved when Joseph von Schaden became the Imperial City Council Consultant in Augsburg. Later that year, Ludwig van Beethoven stopped to visit them, and they gave him money so he could visit his sick mother in Bonn. In 1789, the musicologist Johann Friedrich Reichardt also visited, and later wrote in a letter, “. . . Ms von Schaden – who is by far the greatest piano player of all the musical women I know, including the Parisians; yes, in skill and security possibly unsurpassed by any virtuoso; she also sings with great expression and performance, and is in every respect a pleasant, interesting woman. . . “ In 1793, the von Schadens divorced, and von Schaden and her daughters moved to Regensburg to live with her father.

Von Schaden dedicated her Concerto in Bb Major to Madame la Baronne de Schlammersdorf nee Baronne de Lentersheim, and her Concerto in G Major to Madame la Comtesse de Taufkirchen. At least two works were dedicated to her: Johann Franz Xaver Sterkel’s Keyboard Concerto in Bb Major StWV 152, and Heinrich Marchaud’s Ten Variations for Piano in Bb Major Opus 1.

Although von Schaden is reported to have composed piano sonatas and other pieces, only three remain today, all published by Speier:

- Piano Concerto in Bb Major (with Antonio Rosetti)
- Piano Concerto in G Major (with Antonio Rosetti)
- Rondo in C Major
