= Antonio Rosetti =

C18 Czech composer and double bass player

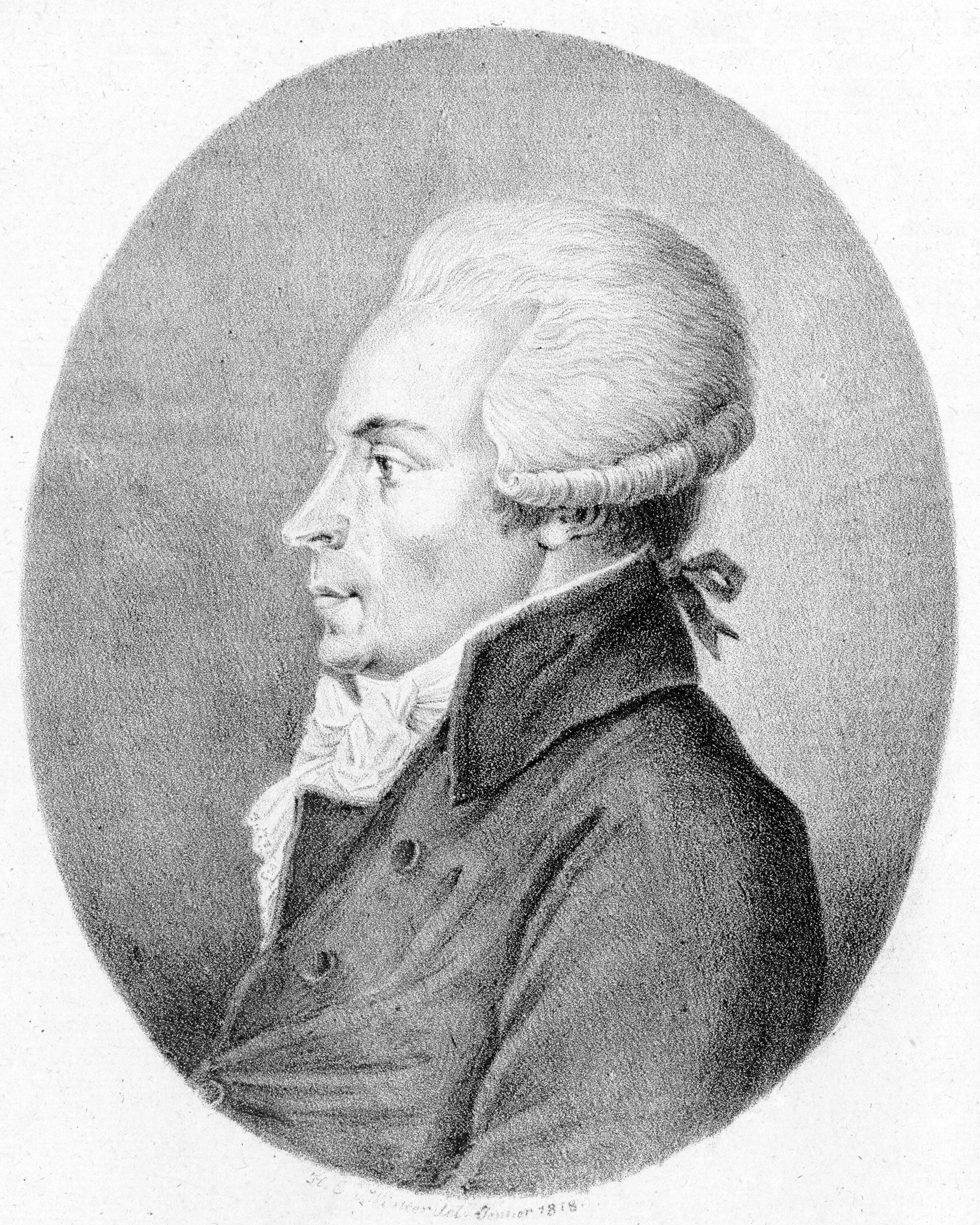
Antonio Rosetti

Francesco Antonio Rosetti (c. 1750 – 30 June 1792) was a classical era composer and double bass player, and was a contemporary of Haydn and Mozart. There is considerable confusion regarding his name. The occasional mention of a supposed, but non-existent, "Antonio Rosetti born 1744 in Milan", is due to an error by Ernst Ludwig Gerber in a later edition of his Tonkünstler-Lexikon having mistaken Rosetti for an Italian in the first edition of his own Lexikon, and therefore including Rosetti twice - once as an Italian, once as a German-Czech. Many sources claim that he was born Franz Anton Rösler, and changed his name to an Italianate form by 1773, but according to a 1792 article by Heinrich Phillip Bossler, who knew Rosetti personally, he was named Rosetti from his birth.

== Life and career ==
Rosetti was born about 1750 in Litoměřice, a town in Northern Bohemia. He is believed to have received early musical training from the Jesuits in Prague. In 1773, Rosetti left his native country and found employment in the Hofkapelle of Prince Kraft Ernst of Oettingen-Wallerstein, whom he served for sixteen years, becoming Kapellmeister in 1785. While there, he orchestrated two piano concerti by Anna von Schaden. In July 1789 Rosetti left Wallerstein to accept the post of Kapellmeister to the Duke Friedrich Franz I of Mecklenburg-Schwerin in Ludwigslust where he died in service of the duke on 30 June 1792 at the age of 42 years. In 1777, he married Rosina Neher, with whom he had three daughters. In late 1781, he was granted leave to spend 5 months in Paris. Many of the finest ensembles in the city performed his works. Rosetti arranged for his music to be published, including a set of six symphonies published in 1782. He returned to his post, assured of recognition as an accomplished composer.

Rosetti wrote over 400 compositions, primarily instrumental music including many symphonies and concertos which were widely published. Rosetti also composed a significant number of vocal and choral works, particularly in the last few years of his life. Among these are German oratorios including Der sterbende Jesu and Jesus in Gethsemane (1790) and a German Hallelujah. The English music historian Charles Burney included Rosetti among the most popular composers of the period in his work A General History of Music. Rosetti is perhaps best known today for his horn concertos, which Mozart scholar H. C. Robbins Landon suggests (in The Mozart Companion) may have been a model for Mozart's four horn concertos. Rosetti is also known for writing a Requiem (1776) which was performed at a memorial for Mozart in December 1791.

Attributing some music to Rosetti is difficult because several other composers with similar names worked at the same time, including Franciscus Xaverius Antonius Rössler.

== Works list ==
Available recordings are listed.

=== Symphonies ===
Catalog Numbers		Name	Key	Recordings
Murray	Kaul	Name	Key	Recordings
A1	I:8	Symphony	C major	CPO 2017
A2	I:46	Symphony	C major	
A3	I:43	Symphony	C major	Deutsche Harmonia Mundi 2016
A4	I:4	Symphony	C major	
A5	I:6	Symphony	C major	
A6	I:11	Symphony	C major	Tacet 1999, Biva 2009, RecArt 2014
A7	I:17	Symphony	C major	
A8	I:26	Symphony	C major	Arte Nova 2000, RBM 1997
A9	I:21	Symphony	C major	Chandos 1997, Teldec 1997
A10	I:3	Symphony	D major	CAB 2003
A11	I:2	Symphony	D major	
A12	I:12	Symphony	D major	Chandos 1997, RecArt 2014
A13	I:30	Symphony	D major	Teldec 1997
A14	I:29	Symphony	D major	MDG 2001
A15	I:33	Symphony	D major	GZ Digital Media 2008
A16	I:7	Symphony	D major	CPO 2011
A17	I:15	Symphony	D major	
A18	I:47	Symphony	D major	
A19	I:13	Symphony	D major	Tacet 1999
A20	I:18	Symphony "La Chasse"	D major	Orfeo 1997, Teldec 1997, MDG 2003
A21	I:20	Symphony	D major	Arte Nova 2000, MDG 2001, Caro Mitis 2005
A22	I:28	Symphony	D major	MDG 2003
A23	I:5	Symphony	E♭ major	Ars Produktion 2011
A24	I:5a	Symphony	E♭ major	
A25	deest	Symphony	E♭ major	
A26	I:35	Symphony	E♭ major	
A27	I:32	Symphony	E♭ major	Arte Nova 2000, Teldec 1995
A28	I:23	Symphony	E♭ major (notated as D♯)	Teldec 1995
A29	I:9	Symphony	E♭ major	RBM 1997, CPO 2017
A30	I:34	Symphony	E♭ major	
A31	deest	Symphony	E♭ major	
A32	I:10 + I:55	Symphony	F major	CPO 2011
A33	I:24	Symphony	F major	Chandos 1997
A34	I:45	Symphony	F major	
A35	I:1	Symphony	F major	Deutsche Harmonia Mundi 2016
A36	I:41	Symphony	F major	
A37	I:37	Symphony	G major	
A38	I:40	Symphony	G major	
A39	I:16	Symphony	G major	CPO 2005
A40	I:22	Symphony	G major	Chandos 1997, Teldec 1997
A41	I:44	Symphony	G major	Deutsche Harmonia Mundi 2016
A42	I:27	Symphony	G minor	RBM 1994, Teldec 1995, Arte Nova 2000, Caro Mitis 2005, K&K 2006, RecArt 2014
A43	I:19	Symphony	B♭ major	MDG 2003
A44	I:38	Symphony	B♭ major	
A45	I:14	Symphony	B♭ major	CPO 2005
A46	I:39	Symphony	B♭ major	
A47	deest	Symphony	B♭ major	lost
A48	I:31	Symphony	B♭ major	RBM 1997
A49	I:25	Symphony	B♭ major	Teldec 1995
A50	deest	Symphony	A minor	lost
A51	I:49	Symphony	D major	

=== Wind ensembles ===
Catalog Numbers		Name	Key	Recordings
Murray	Kaul	Name	Key	Recordings
B1	II:9	Partita	D major	CPO 2004
B2	II:10	Partita	D major	Pan Classics 2006
B3	II:8	Partita	D major	CPO 2004
B4	II:11	Partita	D major	CPO 2004
B5	II:14	Partita	D major	CPO 2004
B6	II:17	Quintet	E♭ major	Deutsche Harmonia Mundi 2013, Ars Produktion 2013
B7	II:20	Partita	E♭ major	
B8	II:22	Partita	E♭ major	
B9	deest	Partita	E♭ major	
B10	II:6	Partita	E♭ major	
B11	II:1	Partita	E♭ major	
B12	deest	Partita	E♭ major	
B13	II:4	Partita	E♭ major	Pan Classics 2006
B14	II:7	Partita	E♭ major	
B15	II:3	Partita	E♭ major	
B16	II:5	Partita	E♭ major	Classico 2006
B17	deest	Quartet	E♭ major	Classico 2006
B18	II:13	Partita	F major	Accent 1989, Classico 2006, Pan Classics 2006, SWR Digital 2020
B19	II:16	Partita	F major	Aulia 2004
B20	II:15	Partita	F major	CPO 2004
B21	II:12	Partita	F major	Pan Classics 2006
B22	II:2	Sextet	B♭ major	Classico 2006
B23	II:23	Partita	B♭ major	
B24	II:19 + II:21	Notturno	D major	Deutsche Harmonia Mundi 2013
B25	I:56	Serenata	C major	
B26	II:18	Septet	E♭ major	Deutsche Harmonia Mundi 2013
B27	I:58	Notturno	E♭ major	CPO 2003, Deutsche Harmonia Mundi 2013
B28	I:60	6 Menuets		lost
B29	I:59	12 Menuets		

=== Concertos ===
Catalog Numbers		Name	Key	Recordings
Murray	Kaul	Name	Key	Recordings
C1	deest	Piano Concerto	E♭ major	
C2	III:1	Piano Concerto	G major	Tacet 1999, Capriccio 2002
C3	III:2	Piano Concerto	G major	Tacet 1999
C4	III:3	Piano Concerto	B♭ major	CPO 2017
C5	III:8	Violin Concerto	C major	CPO 2020
C6	III:9	Violin Concerto	D major	CPO 2005
C7	III:7	Violin Concerto	D major	CPO 2020
C8	deest	Violin Concerto	D major	
C9	III:5	Violin Concerto	D minor	CPO 2005, Caro Mitis 2005
C10	III:6	Violin Concerto	E♭ major	
C11	III:4	Violin Concerto	F major	CPO 2020
C12	deest	Violin Concerto	A major	partly lost
C13	III:10	Violin Concerto	A major	
C14	I:36	Symphonie Concertante for 2 Violins	D major	MDG 2001
C15	deest	Viola Concerto	G major	Sony Classical 2009
C16	III:14	Flute Concerto	C major	Orfeo 2003
C17	III:16	Flute Concerto	D major	Vars 2001
C18	III:12	Flute Concerto	D major	Supraphon 1956/2002
C19	III:23	Flute Concerto	E♭ major	Naxos 2008
C20	III:18	Flute Concerto	E♭ major	
C21	III:20	Flute Concerto	F major	Orfeo 2003
C22	III:13	Flute Concerto	G major	Alba 2003, Orfeo 2003
C23	III:11	Flute Concerto	G major	Vars 1997
C24	III:19	Flute Concerto	G major	Deutsche Harmonia Mundi 2016
C25	III:17	Flute Concerto	G major	Orfeo 2003
C26	III:24	Flute Concerto	G major	
C27	III:22	Flute Concerto	G major	Koch Schwann 2001
C28	III:21	Flute Concerto	G major	MDG 2003
C29	III:32	Oboe Concerto	C major	CPO 2011
C30	III:27	Oboe Concerto	C major	CPO 2011
C31	III:29	Oboe Concerto	C major	CPO 1991
C32	III:34	Oboe Concerto	C major	
C33	III:28	Oboe Concerto	D major	CPO 1991
C34	III:31	Oboe Concerto	F major	CPO 1991, Naxos 2002
C35	deest	Oboe Concerto	F major	
C36	III:30	Oboe Concerto	G major	MDG 2001
C37	III:25	Oboe Concerto	G major	
C38	III:43	Horn Concerto	D minor	Caro Mitis 2005, Hanssler 2001, Teldec 1994, Nimbus 1988, Rosa 1998, Supraphon 2010
C39	deest	Horn Concerto	D minor	Deutsche Harmonia Mundi 2016
C40	III:35	Horn Concerto	E♭ major	Arte Nova 2002
C41	III:39	Horn Concerto	E♭ major	ebs 1997, EMI Classics 1986, Pan Classics 1998
C42	III:41	Horn Concerto	E♭ major	
C43	deest	Horn Concerto	E♭ major	Arte Nova 2002
C44	III:48	Horn Concerto	E♭ major	lost
C45	III:46	Horn Concerto	E♭ major	lost
C46	III:47	Horn Concerto	E♭ major	lost
C47	III:40	Horn Concerto	E♭ major	Arte Nova 2002
C48	III:37	Horn Concerto	E♭ major	CPO 2009
C49	III:36	Horn Concerto	E♭ major	Hanssler 2001, Rosa 1998, ebs 1997, Zuk 2005, Supraphon 2010
C50	III:44	Horn Concerto	E major	CPO 2009, EMI Classics 1986
C51	III:42	Horn Concerto	E major	Hanssler 2001, Rosa 1998, EMI Classics 1986
C52	III:45	Horn Concerto	E♭ major	Arte Nova 2002
C53	III:38	Horn Concerto	F major	Hanssler 2001, Rosa 1998
C54	deest	Horn Concerto	E♭ major	
C55	III:54	Concerto for 2 Horns	E♭ major	Naxos 1991
C56	deest	Concerto for 2 Horns	E♭ major	CPO 2003; Aparte 2024
C57	III:53	Concerto for 2 Horns	E♭ major	CPO 2003
C58	III:51	Concerto for 2 Horns	E major	CPO 2003
C59	III:50	Concerto for 2 Horns	E major	lost
C60	III:52	Concerto for 2 Horns	E major and F major	CPO 1999
C61	III:49	Concerto for 2 Horns	F major	CPO 2009, ebs 1997, BVA 1992, Naxos 1991
C62	III:55	Clarinet Concerto	E♭ major	CPO 1999
C63	III:57	Clarinet Concerto	E♭ major	CPO 1999
C64	III:58	Clarinet Concerto	E♭ major	lost
C65	deest	Clarinet Concerto	E♭ major	lost
C66	III:65	Clarinet Concerto	E♭ major	lost
C67	deest	Bassoon Concerto	C major	CPO 2012
C68	III:64	Bassoon Concerto	E♭ major	CPO 2012
C69	III:60	Bassoon Concerto	B♭ major	CPO 2003, Naxos 2003
C70	III:67	Bassoon Concerto	B♭ major	lost
C71	III:65	Bassoon Concerto	B♭ major	lost
C72	III:66	Bassoon Concerto	B♭ major	CPO 2012
C73	III:61	Bassoon Concerto	B♭ major	CPO 2003, Naxos 2003
C74	III:62	Bassoon Concerto	B♭ major	CPO 2003, Naxos 2003, Hungaroton 2006
C75	III:63	Bassoon Concerto	F major	CPO 2003, Naxos 2003
C76	deest	Sinfonia Concertante for 2 Violins	E♭ major	

=== Chamber music ===
Catalog Numbers		Name	Key	Recordings
Murray	Kaul	Name	Key	Recordings
D1	IV:5.1	String Trio	C major	
D2	IV:5.2	String Trio	G major	
D3	IV:5.3	String Trio	D major	
D4	IV:5.4	String Trio	F major	
D5	deest	String Trio	C major	
D6	IV:1.1	String Quartet Op 4/1	A major	Gramola 2013
D7	IV:1.2	String Quartet Op 4/2	C major	
D8	IV:1.3	String Quartet Op 4/3	E♭ major	
D9	IV:2.1	String Quartet Op 6/1	A major	CPO 1995
D10	IV:2.2	String Quartet Op 6/2	E♭ major	CPO 1995, SWR Digital 2020
D11	IV:2.3	String Quartet Op 6/3	B♭ major	CPO 1995
D12	IV:2.4	String Quartet Op 6/4	C minor	CPO 1995
D13	IV:2.5	String Quartet Op 6/5	D major	CPO 1995
D14	IV:2.6	String Quartet Op 6/6	F major	CPO 1995
D15	IV:4.1	String Quartet	A major	
D16	IV:4.2	Flute Quartet	G major	Deutsche Harmonia Mundi 2013
D17	IV:4.3	String Quartet	F major	
D18	IV:3	Bassoon Quartet	B♭ major	
D19	IV:13.1	Violin Sonata	D major	Supraphon 2000, Arte Nova 2003
D20	IV:13.2	Violin Sonata	E♭ major	Supraphon 2000, Arte Nova 2003, Naxos 2003
D21	IV:13.3	Violin Sonata	B♭ major	Supraphon 2000, Arte Nova 2003
D22	IV:13.4	Violin Sonata	G major	Supraphon 2000, Arte Nova 2003
D23	IV:13.5	Violin Sonata	B♭ major	Supraphon 2000, Arte Nova 2003
D24	IV:13.6	Violin Sonata	C major	Supraphon 2000, Arte Nova 2003
D25	IV:14	Violin Sonata	F major	lost
D26	IV:7.1	Piano Trio Op 1/1	G major	
D27	IV:7.2	Piano Trio Op 1/2	F major	
D28	IV:7.3	Piano Trio Op 1/3	B♭ major	
D29	IV:8.1	Piano Trio Op 5/1	C major	
D30	IV:8.2	Piano Trio Op 5/2	E♭ major	
D31	IV:8.3	Piano Trio Op 5/3	D major	
D32	IV:8.4	Piano Trio Op 5/4	D major	
D33	IV:8.5	Piano Trio Op 5/5	A major	
D34	IV:8.6	Piano Trio Op 5/6	C major	
D35	IV:9.1	Piano Trio Op 7/1	G major	
D36	IV:9.2	Piano Trio Op 7/2	B♭ major	
D37	IV:9.3	Piano Trio Op 7/3	F major	
D38	IV:9.4	Piano Trio Op 7/4	C major	
D39	IV:12.1	Piano Trio	C major	lost
D40	IV:12.2	Piano Trio	C major	lost
D41	IV:12.3	Piano Trio	D major	lost
D42	IV:10.2	Piano Trio	F major	lost
D43	IV:6.1	Violin Duet	E♭ major	
D44	IV:6.2	Violin Duet	B♭ major	
D45	IV:6.3	Violin Duet	G major	
D46	IV:6.4	Violin Duet	A major	
D47	IV:6.5	Violin Duet	D major	
D48	IV:6.6	Violin Duet	C minor	
D49	II:24	Quartet for piccolo violin, 2 oboes & continuo	C major	lost
D50	II:25	Flute Quartet	C major	lost
D51	II:26	Cassation	D major	lost
D52	II:27	Cassation	E♭ major	lost

Note: The recordings of D19 through D24 above are arrangements for harp.

=== Piano ===
Catalog Numbers		Name	Key	Recordings
Murray	Kaul	Name	Key	Recordings
E1	V:6	Piano Sonata	F major	
E2	V:5	Piano Sonata	G major	
E3	V:3	Piano Sonata	B♭ major	
E4		Piano Sonata	F major	
E5		Anglaise	D major	
E6		Anglaise	F major	
E7		Anglaise	D major	
E8		Menuet	F major	
E9		Menuet	C major	
E10		Menuet	G major	
E11		Menuet	G major	
E12		Menuet	F major	
E13		Menuet	D major	
E14		Menuet	D major	
E15		Menuet	C major	
E16		Menuet	C major	
E17		Menuet	D major	
E18		Menuet	C major	
E19		Menuet	D major	
E20		Menuet	C major	
E21		Alla Polacca	C major	
E22		Schleifer	A major	
E23		Schleifer	G major	
E24		Schleifer	G major	
E25		Deutscher Walzer	F major	
E26		Deutscher Walzer	A major	
E27		Romance	E♭ major	
E28		Romance	A major	
E29		Romance	E♭ major	
E30		Romance	A major	
E31		Romance	B♭ major	
E32		Romance	B♭ major	
E33		Romance	B♭ major	
E34		Romance	G major	
E35		Romance	B♭ major	
E36		Romance	B♭ major	
E37		Rondo	B♭ major	
E38		Rondo	D major	
E39		Rondo	E♭ major	
E40		Rondo	G major	
E41		Rondo	A major	
E42		Rondeau	G major	
E43		Rondo	C major	
E44		Capriccio	C major	
E45		Capriccio	F minor	
E46		Capriccio	D major	
E47		Allegro	D major	
E48		Allegro assai	F major	
E49		Allegretto	A major	
E50		Allegretto non presto	D major	
E51		Allegro scherzante	G major	
E52		Allegretto scherzante	B♭ major	
E53		Allegro scherzante	G major	
E54		Allegro scherzando	E♭ major	
E55		Allegretto	A minor	
E56		Allegretto	G major	
E57		Andante	B♭ major	
E58		Andante	E minor	
E59		Grazioso	E minor	
E60		Moderato	D major	
E61		Non presto	A major	
E62		Presto non tanto	E♭ major	
E63	V:7.1	Piano Sonata	B♭ major	
E64	V:7.2	Piano Sonata	F major	
E65	V:7.3	Piano Sonata	G major	
E66	V:7.4	Piano Sonata	E♭ major	
E67		Variations (6)	G major	
E68		German Dances (4) for Piano 4-Hands		

=== Vocal works ===
Catalog Number	Type	Title	Text	Key	Recordings
Murray	Type	Title	Text	Key	Recordings
F1	Song	Abendgedanken eines Jüngling	Wie so schön der Sonne letzte Strahlen	E major	
F2	Song	Abschied an Theonen	Nun Theone naht die Stunde	B♭ major	
F3	Song	Acrostiche	Ce que j'aime, c'est ma Colette	G major	
F4	Song	Air de Monsieur le Chevalier de Rosetti	Les Dieux ne formèrent Lisette	F minor	
F5	Song	Als Dafne weinte	Wunderschön ist die Natur	D minor	
F6	Song	Am Fenster beim Mondschein	Nacht und still ist um mich her kaum	A major	
F7	Song	An den Frühling	Wilkommen schöner Jüngling, du Wonne der Natur	E♭ major	
F8	Song	An die Muse	Du, die voll Glut den Lorbeer einst besungen	F minor	
F9	Song	An ein junges Mädchen	Du kleine Blondine bezaubert ja schon	A major	
F10	Song	An ein kleines Mädchen	Tanze, liebe Kleine! hüpfe durch dies Leben	F major	
F11	Song	An einen Blumenstraus	Blumen die mit lieber Hand	B♭ major	
F12	Song	An einem heitern Frühlingsmorgen	Wilkommen mir, O Birkenhain	A major	
F13	Song	An einen Wassertrinker	Trink betrübter todtenblasser Wassertrinker	B♭ major	
F14	Song	An mein Täubchen	Geh trautes liebes Täubchen	G major	
F15	Song	An Mutter Natur	Mutter ist ein süsses Lied	B♭ major	
F16	Song	An Selindes Augen	O, wie leuchtest du so klar	E♭ major	
F17	Song	Der Apfel	Als jüngst Hänschen in dem Gras	D minor	
F18	Song	Aufmunterung zur Freude	Heitre dich mein Weibchen auf!	E minor	
F19	Song	Ballade	Ein troziger Ritter im fränkischen Land	D major	
F20	Song	Die Biene und der Rosskäfer	Ein Bienchen sass im sanften Schose	F major	
F21	Song	Blumenlied	Es ist ein halbes Himmelreich	G major	
F22	Song	Doris an das Klavier	Gefährte meiner Einsamkeit	F major	
F23	Song	Doris an Lotten	Du fliechst! umringt von Schmerzen	E♭ major	
F24	Song	Edgar an Psyche	Welch ein Leben kleine Psyche	B♭ major	
F25	Song	Ein Lied von der Liebe	Liebe, Liebe beseligt das Leben	B♭ major	
F26	Song	Ein Stückchen von meinem Bruder	Ich hab ein kleines Brüderchen	C major	
F27	Song	Eine sehr gewöhnliche Geschichte	Filink stand jüngst vor Babets Thür	G major	
F28	Song	Das eitle Mädchen	O, wie viel gebricht mir an Schönheit nicht!	B♭ major	
F29	Song	Frizchens Lob des Landlebens	Rühmt immer eure grosse Stadt	E major	
F30	Song	Der Garten des Lebens	Der Garten des Lebens ist lieblich	E minor	
F31	Song	Das Glück auf dem Lande	Unter diesem stillen Schatten	E major	
F32	Song	Der glückliche Bauer	Ihr, schwätz mir da von einem Bauer	D major	
F33	Song	Der glückliche Landmann	Heida, lustig! ich bin Hanns	C major	
F34	Song	Grethchens Lied	Seit in der Näh' ich mein Hänschen gesehn	A major	
F35	Song	Guter Muth	Und wenn ich auch kein König bin	C major	
F36	Song	Hannchen	Nachbar Veitens Hannchen ging neulich Gras zu	B♭ major	
F37	Song	Huldigung	Euch ihr Schönen! will ich fröhnen	F minor	
F38	Song	Jost mit der Schelle	Für'n armen Jost, sei mildreich Erden Sohn	A minor	
F39	Song	Der junge Baum	Das liebe, kleine Bäumchen hier	F minor	
F40	Song	Karlinchen ein Jahr alt	Sieh! er kommt im frohen Feierkleide	A major	
F41	Song	Das Klavier	Süss ertönendes Klavier, welche Freude schaffst du	A major	
F42	Song	Könnt ich mein Liebchen kaufen	Könnt ich mein Liebchen kaufen	A major	
F43	Song	Das Lamm	Wie nah, du armens Lämmchen	E♭ major	
F44	Song	Der Landmann hinter dem Pflug	Der war gewiss ein frommer Mann	D major	
F45	Song	Das Leben ist ein Traum	Das Leben ist ein Traum	E♭ major	
F46	Song	Liebe über Liebe	Mutter sieh den bösen Vogel	E♭ major	
F47	Song	Der Liebende	Beglückt, wer dich erblikt	E♭ major	
F48	Song	Liebestaumel	Was geht die ganze Welt mich an	F major	
F49	Song	Liebeserklärung	Ich liebe dich, ich darf es nur nicht	A major	Brilliant Classics 2008
F50	Song	Das Liebesgrab	Selmar war ein guter Junge jedem Menschen war	A♭ major	
F51	Song	Lied eines gemeinen Mannes	Ich will nicht sorgen mich, nicht kümmern	F major	
F52	Song	Lied in der Kurzeit	O, wer wollt so thörigt sein Martern sich	D major	
F53	Song	Liedchen	Ich hatt' einmal ein Mädchen	B♭ major	
F54	Song	Lob des Höchsten	Zu Sions Höhen hin erhebt	E major	
F55	Song	Das Mädchen bei der ersten Rotenzusammenkunft	Winter ist's drum ei'a nu Mädchen greift	A major	
F56	Song	Mailied	Gegrüsset Morgen Wolke!	E♭ major	
F57	Song	Mailied	Der Schnee zerinnt, der Mai beginnt	A major	
F58	Song	Mein Mädchen	Liebe, Liebe, welche Freuden	A major	
F59	Song	Der Mond	Wie süss und freundlich lacht des Mondes	G major	
F60	Song	Nachtigallenlied	Heut Morgen als ich lauschend schlich durch Büsch	G major	
F61	Song	Der Negersklave	Hintern Meeresstrande wo die Sonne	C♯ minor	
F62	Song	Die Nelke	Wor ihrer Hütte wom West umweht	B♭ major	
F63	Song	Pastorale	Rossignol dont la voix touchante	E♭ major	
F64	Song	Das Rothkehlchen	So seh ich euch denn all entweichen	B♭ major	
F65	Song	Rundgesang	Unsre Herzen zu erfreun gab uns Gott	C major	
F66	Song	Der Sonderling	Baut stolze Schlösser in die Luft	D major	
F67	Song	Die Sonne beim Aufgange	Sei mir gegrüsst zu meines Gottes	A major	
F68	Song	Der Traum	Ich träumt' ich war ein Vögelein und flog auf	A major	
F69	Song	Trinklied	Das Glas gefült der Norwind brült	D major	
F70	Song	Die Unschuld	O Unschuld weihe du mich ganz!	E♭ major	
F71	Song	Urians Reise um die Welt	Wenn jemand eine Reise thut	B♭ major	
F72	Song	Vergänglichkeit	Tausendmal hab ich's empfunden	G major	
F73	Song	Der verliebte Schäfer	Komm, sei mein Liebchen!schenke mir dein Herzchen	B♭ major	
F74	Song	Die Verschwiegenheit	Heimlich nur, doch inniglich	F minor	
F75	Song	Vor einer Reise im Winter	Morgen, Morgen geht es fort	B♭ major	
F76	Song	Vor einer Reise zu Liebchen	Bravo, bravo! iezt empfohl	G major	
F77	Song	Der wahre Reichtum	Warum durchirrt nach Gut und Geld	C major	
F78	Song	Wiegenlied	Schlaf Kind, sieh hier an meinem Herzen	E♭ major	
F79	Song	Winterlied	Kein Veilchen blüht, kein Röschen glüht	A major	
F80	Song	Der Winter	Nicht dir, O Lenz! will ich allein nur	A major	
F81	Song	Der Zufrieden	Ich gäbe nimmer zufrieden Sinn	B♭ major	
F82	Song	Der Zufrieden	Meine Wûnsche sind gestillt	F minor	
F83	Hymn	Ah chare, ah Jesu peccavi	Ah chare, ah Jesu peccavi	B♭ major	
F84	Antiphon	Salve Regina	Salve Regina Mater misericordiae	C major	
F85	Antiphon	Salve Regina	Salve Regina Mater misericordiae	E♭ major	Ars Produktion 2011
F86	Antiphon	Salve Regina	Salve Regina Mater misericordiae	E♭ major	CPO 2008
F87	Antiphon	Salve Regina	Salve Regina Mater misericordiae	G major	CPO 2008
F88	Antiphon	Salve Regina	Salve Regina Mater misericordiae	A major	CPO 2008
F89	Antiphon	Salve Regina	Salve Regina Mater misericordiae	B♭ major	CPO 2008
F90	Concert Aria	Tutta di sdegno armato	Tutta di sdegno armato	C major	
F91	Concert Aria	Wenn aus zerschmetternden Gewittern	Wenn aus zerschmetternden Gewittern	C major	
F92	Antiphon	Salve Regina	Salve Regina Mater misericordiae	F major	
F93	Hymn	Teomi Jesu adoro	Teomi Jesu adoro	C major	
F94	Hymn	Amavit eum Dominus amavit	Amavit eum Dominus amavit	C major	
F95	Hymn	Attendite vigilate et orate	Attendite vigilate et orate	G minor	
F96	Hymn	Diffusa est gratia	Diffusa est gratia in labiis	E♭ major	
F97	Hymn	Huc catastae	Huc catastae huc orci larvae	D major	
F98	Concert Aria	Non vidi alma	Non vidi alma che freme	F major	
F99	Hymn	Qua est ista	Qua est ista qua ascendit	G major	
F100	Antiphon	Salve Regina	Salve Regina Mater misericordiae	B♭ major	
F101	Antiphon	Parvulus filius	Parvulus filius hodie natus est	G major	
F102	Antiphon	Gaude Virgo Mater Christi	Gaude Virgo Mater Christi	E minor	
F103	Antiphon	De Beatissimae Virgine Maria	?	E♭ major	voice parts lost
F104	Concert Aria	Or che per te sospiro	Or che per te sospiro	A major	
F105	Concert Aria	Ariette	Que dans sa détresse, l'amant qui me blesse	F minor	
F106	Concert Aria	Rondeau	A mes voeux le ciel propice	C major	
F107	Concert Aria	Rondo	Vous prenez un air sévère	F major	
F108	Concert Aria	Scena e rondo	Calme ton âme...Mais par vengeance	C major	
F109	Antiphon	A periens os suum dixit	A periens os suum dixit	B♭ major	

=== Choral works ===
Catalog Number	Type	Name	Date	Author/Note	Recordings
Murray	Type	Name	Date	Author/Note	Recordings
G1	Oratorio	Der sterbende Jesu	1785	Karl Friedrich Bernhard Zinkernagel	
G2	Oratorio	Jesus in Gethsemane	1790	Heinrich Julius Tode	CPO 2008
G3	Cantata	Aufs Osterfest	c.1790	Parody of Mass Murray H4	
G4	Cantata	Aufs Deutschlands Genius oder Friedenfest	c.1790		
G5	Cantata	Dank Kantate	c.1790	Music entirely from Murray G1	
G6	Cantata	Ewiger dir singen wir	c.1790	Christian Gotthilf Tag	
G7	Cantata	Hallelujah	1791	Heinrich Julius Tode	CPO 2008
G8	Incidental Music	Das Winterfest der Hirten	1789		
G9	Vaudeville	La matinée des artistes		Voice parts lost	
G10	Ode	Gesegnet sei die Stunde	1790	Heinrich Julius Tode	
G11	Choral	O Segne sei, du Geber grosser Freuden	1789		
G12	Cantata	Al sospire		Possibly by Antonio Rosetti (b. 1744)	

=== Liturgical works ===
Catalog Number	Type	Name	Key	Date	Recordings
Murray	Type	Name	Key	Date	Recordings
H1	Mass	Mass	C major		
H2	Mass	Mass	C major	1782	
H3	Mass	Mass	C minor		
H4	Mass	Mass	D major	1787	
H5	Mass	Mass	D major		
H6	Mass	Mass	D major	1788	
H7	Mass	Mass	D minor		lost
H8	Mass	Mass	D minor		
H9	Mass	Mass	E♭ major		
H10	Mass	Mass	F major		
H11	Mass	Mass	F major	1784	
H12	Mass	Missa brevis	F major	c.1790	
H13	Mass	Mass	G minor		
H14	Requiem	Requiem	C minor		
H15	Requiem	Requiem	E♭ major	1776	Ars Produktion 2011
H16	Requiem	Requiem	E♭ major	c.1780	
H17	Requiem	Requiem	E♭ major		
H18	Requiem	Requiem	E♭ major		
H19	Requiem	Requiem	F major		
H20	Requiem	Requiem	G minor		
H21	Choral	Der Herr der aller Enden	B♭ major	c.1790	
H22	Choral	Ich habe nun den Grund gefunden	D major	c.1790	
H23	Gradual	Lauda O Sion	C major		
H24	Gradual	Venite ad me	E♭ major		Ars Produktion 2011
H25	Gradual	Viderunt omnes	B♭ major		Ars Produktion 2011
H26	Offertory	Ecce video caelos apertos	D major	c.1790	
H27	Offertory	Huc ad este pie mentes	E♭ major		
H28	Offertory	O felix Roma	E♭ major		
H29	Offertory	Laetare mater ecclesia	C major		
H30	Hymn	Pange lingua	E♭ major	1785	
H31	Hymn	Jesu, rex fortissime	B minor	c.1785	Ars Produktion 2011
H32	Psalm setting	Singet dem Herrn	C major	c.1790	
H33	Antiphon	Ave Maria	C major		
H34	Antiphon	Asperges me	C major		
H35	Antiphon	Salve Regina	E♭ major		
H36	Canticle	Te Deum	D major		
H37	Canticle	Litaniae	C major		
H38	Canticle	Litaniae	C major	1789	
H39	Canticle	Litaniae	D major	1790	
H40	Psalm setting	Miserere	D minor	c.1790	
H41	Psalm setting	Vesperae solemnes	C major		
