= Schlafe, mein Prinzchen, schlaf ein =

German Lullaby

Song
- Language: German
- English title: Sleep, my little prince, fall asleep
- Published: 1799
- Genre: Lullaby
- Composer: Bernhard Flies
- Lyricist: Friedrich Wilhelm Gotter

"Schlafe, mein Prinzchen, schlaf ein" ("Sleep, my little prince, fall asleep") is a German lullaby dating from the 18th century. Mostly it was used as a German Christmas song, around the holiday and it was mostly sung by young choirs.

== History ==
The words are by Friedrich Wilhelm Gotter. For many years, the common view was that the melody was composed by Wolfgang Amadeus Mozart and it was entered into the Köchel catalogue as K. 350. Attribution for the melody has since shifted to either Bernhard Flies or Friedrich Fleischmann, and it has been removed from the main body of the Köchel catalogue and put into the appendix for spurious or doubtful works as K. Anh. C 8.48.

== Lyrics ==
Schlafe, mein Prinzchen, schlaf ein,
Schäfchen ruhn und Vögelein,
Garten und Wiese verstummt,
auch nicht ein Bienchen mehr summt,
Luna mit silbernem Schein
gucket zum Fenster herein,
schlafe bei silbernem Schein,
schlafe, mein Prinzchen, schlaf ein,
schlaf ein, schlaf ein!

Auch in dem Schlosse schon liegt
alles in Schlummer gewiegt,
reget kein Mäuschen sich mehr,
Keller und Küche sind leer,
nur in der Zofe Gemach
tönet ein schmachtendes Ach!
Was für ein Ach mag das sein?
Schlafe, mein Prinzchen, schlaf ein,
schlaf ein, schlaf ein!

Wer ist beglückter als du?
Nichts als Vergnügen und Ruh!
Spielwerk und Zucker vollauf
und noch Karossen im Lauf,
Alles besorgt und bereit,
dass nur mein Prinzchen nicht schreit.
Was wird da künftig erst sein?
Schlafe, mein Prinzchen, schlaf ein,
schlaf ein, schlaf ein!

Sleep, my little prince, sleep,
The sheep and the birdies rest,
The garden and the meadow are quiet,
Not even a little bee buzzes anymore.
Luna, with a silverly glow
Looks in through the window,
Sleep by the silvery glow,
Sleep, my little prince, sleep,
Sleep, sleep!

By now, all are in bed in the castle,
All lulled into a slumber,
No more mice stir,
The basement and kitchen are empty.
Only in the maid's chambers
There sounds a languishing sigh!
What might this sigh be for?
Sleep, my little prince, sleep,
Sleep, sleep!

Who is happier than you?
Nothing but pleasure and peace!
All trinkets and sugar,
And a trotting stage-coach.
Everyone's anxious and ready
That my little prince will just not cry.
But what will the future bring?
Sleep, my little prince, sleep,
Sleep, sleep!

== Melody ==
Setting from Nottebohm, Gustav, ed. (1877). "Wiegenlied". Mozarts Werke. VII: Lieder und Kanons. Vol. 1. Leipzig: Breitkopf & Härtel. p. 20..
