= Alexej Barchevitch =

German Russian violinist

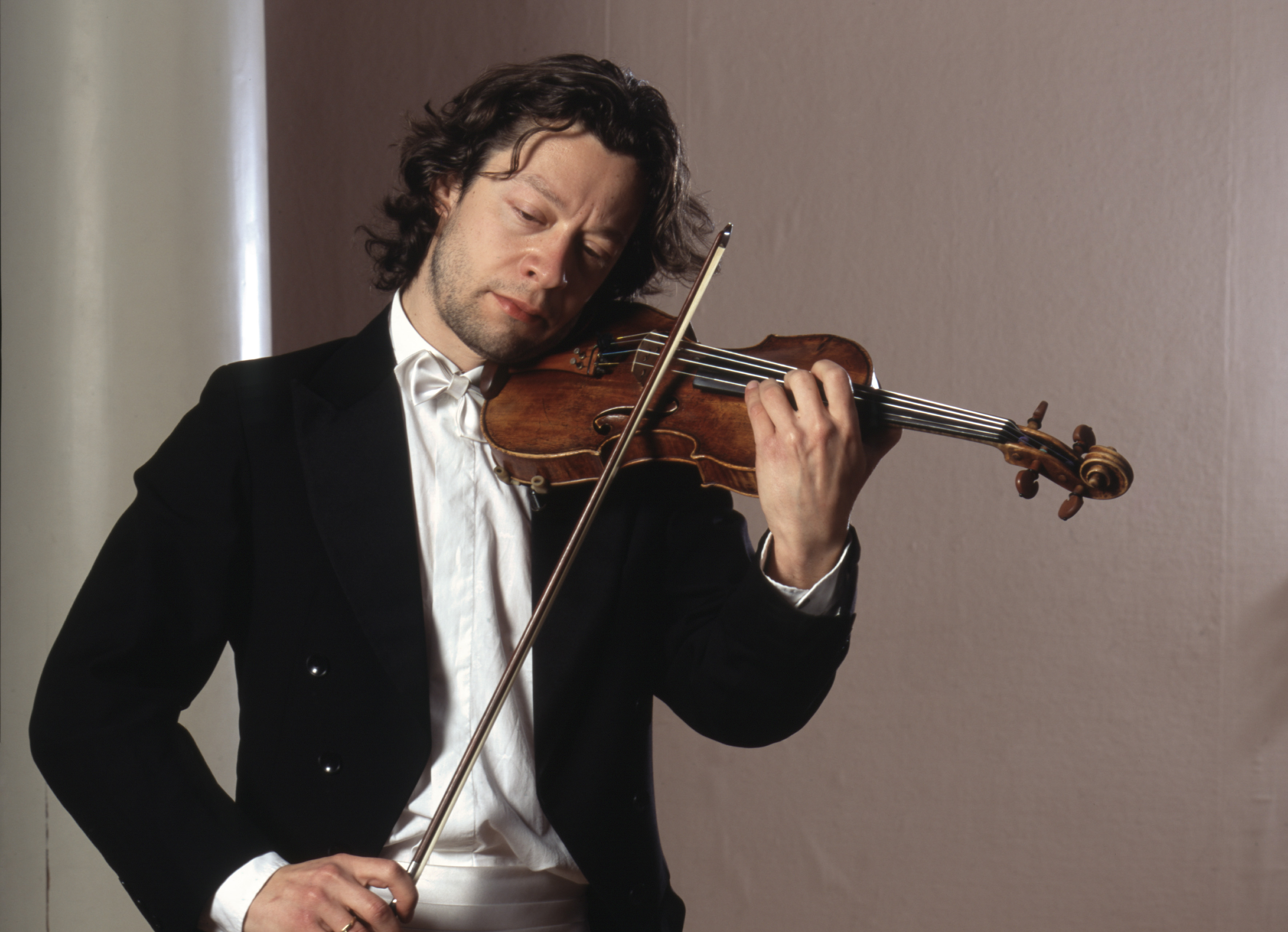
Alexej Barchevitch (May 2011)

Alexej Barchevitch (Алексей Баршевич, born 6 November 1976) is a German violinist and concertmaster of Russian origin.

== Life ==
Barchevitch was born in 1976 in Leningrad (now St. Petersburg) to a family of musicians. He attended the special music school of the Saint Petersburg Conservatory with professor Larissa Baranova. He continued his education with Jost Witter at the Musikgymnasium Schloss Belvedere in Weimar. He then began studying at the University of Music Franz Liszt Weimar Weimar with Jost Witter and graduated in 1998. Postgraduate studies followed and in 2003 he graduated with a concert diploma.

Barchevitch gained orchestral experience as concertmaster of the "Belvedere" Chamber Orchestra, the University Orchestra and as soloist of the orchestra of the International Youth Orchestra Academy.

From 2001, this was followed by several assignments as first concertmaster with the London Philharmonic Orchestra (LPO) and with the Staatsphilharmonie Nürnberg and the Frankfurt Opera. From 2001 to 2005, he worked as first concertmaster at the Meiningen Court Theatre. From 2005 to 2009, he was first concertmaster of "de Filharmonie"/Royal Flemish Philharmonic in Antwerp. In 2009/2010, he was first concertmaster of the Meininger Hofkapelle. Since January 2011 he has been first concertmaster of the Thüringen Philharmonie Gotha, now Thüringen Philharmonie Gotha-Eisenach.

== Instruments ==
- 1997 Loan of a Giovanni Battista Guadagnini violin played by Louis Spohr.
- 1999 loan of a Vincenzo Panormo-violin, Foundation German Music Life
- since 2003 he plays a Carlo Ferdinando Landolfi violin

== Awards ==
- 1993 Bundeswettbewerb Jugend musiziert, laureate
- 1996 Pierre-Lantier-Wettbewerb, Paris/Frankreich, 1st prize (Grand Prix) and Special prize
- 1997 DAAD-Preis (Deutscher Akademischer Austauschdienst)
- 1998 Andrea-Postaccini-Wettbewerb, Fermo/Italien, 2nd prize.
- 1998 Louis Spohr competition, Weimar, third prize

=== Reviews ===
- „Alexej Barschewitsch rettet Sinfoniekonzert in Gotha“ Thüringer Allgemeine, 12 May 2012
- „Beglückendes Erlebnis“ Meininger Tageblatt 29 December 2011
- „Hunde kläfften zu den schönsten Tönen“ Meininger Tageblatt 6 Jul 2010
