= Thüringen Philharmonie Gotha-Eisenach =

German symphonic orchestra

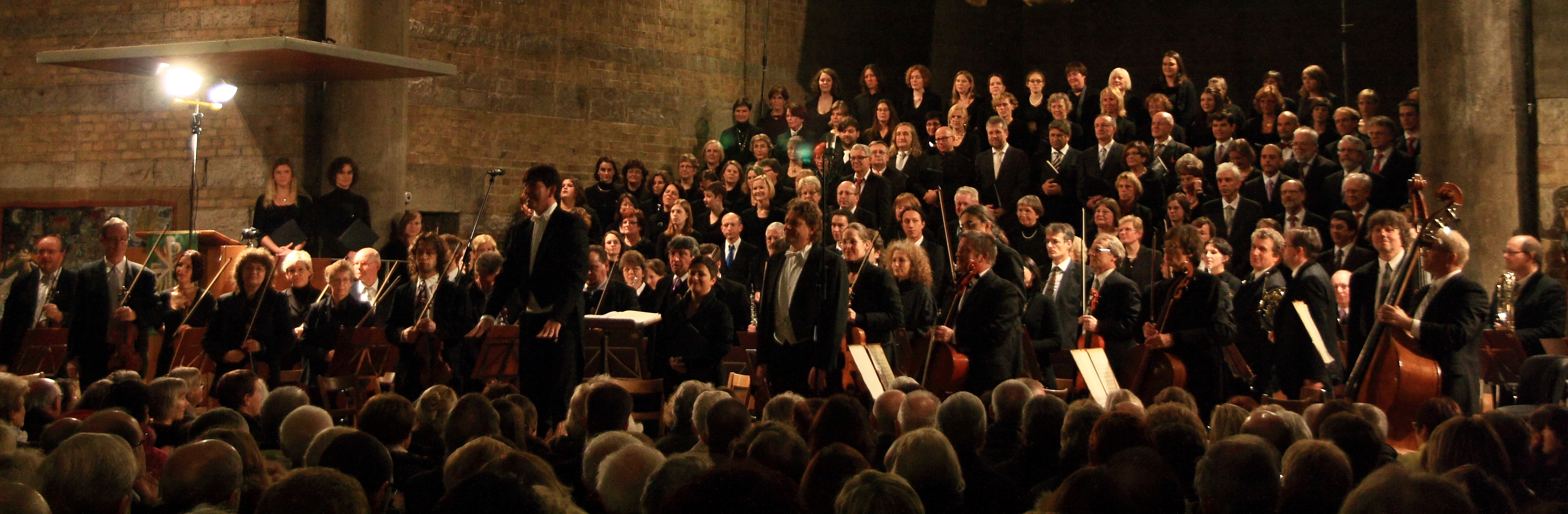
Premiere of Brahms' Ein deutsches Requiem with the Oratorienchor Würzburg conducted by Matthias Göttemann in the Johanniskirche, Würzburg, November 2012

The Thüringen Philharmonie Gotha-Eisenach is a symphony orchestra in the city of Gotha. The orchestra was formed in 2017 through the merger of the Thüringen Philharmonie Gotha with the Stadtorchester Eisenach.

== History ==
=== Gotha State Orchestra ===
Ever since Ernest I, Duke of Saxe-Gotha founded a Staatskapelle in 1651, Gotha had had a local orchestra. This gave rise to the "Landeskapelle Gotha".

=== Gotha State Symphony Orchestra ===
After the dissolution of the States in the GDR in 1952, the name Landeskapelle was no longer desired. The Landeskapelle Gotha was renamed the "Staatliches Sinfonieorchester Gotha". One of its conductors was Gerhart Wiesenhütter.

=== Thuringia State Symphony Orchestra Gotha ===
After the Peaceful Revolution, the "Gotha State Symphony Orchestra" was renamed "Landessinfonieorchester Thüringen Gotha".

=== Thuringia Philharmonic Orchestra Gotha-Suhl ===
In 1998, the "Landessinfonieorchester Thüringen Gotha" was united with the "Thüringen Philharmonie Suhl" (until 1979: "Staatliches Sinfonieorchester Suhl") founded in 1953. Dirigenten des Suhler Orchesters waren Siegfried Geißler, Claus Peter Flor and Olaf Koch gewesen. The new orchestra was called "Thüringen Philharmonie Gotha-Suhl".

=== Thüringen Philharmonie Gotha ===
In 2009, there was a drastic change at the Thüringen Philharmonie. Due to austerity measures, the state of Thuringia cut its subsidies for theatres and orchestras in Thuringia. In addition, the city of Suhl discontinued its co-sponsorship and co-financing of the Thuringia Philharmonic Gotha-Suhl on 31 December 2008 due to empty city coffers. Thus, the Thuringia Philharmonic Orchestra Gotha-Suhl was short of 1 million euros, which eventually led to a reduction of the orchestra's membership by 17 musicians to 51 members. The continued existence of the renowned orchestra was finally secured by a further increase in financial subsidies from the city of Gotha and the district of Gotha. The name of the orchestra was changed to Thüringen Philharmonie Gotha on 1 January 2009 following the withdrawal of the city of Suhl.

=== Thuringia Philharmonic Orchestra Gotha-Eisenach ===
At the beginning of the 2017/2018 season, the "Thüringen Philharmonie Gotha" merged with the "Landeskapelle Eisenach" to form the "Thüringen Philharmonie Gotha-Eisenach". 20 musicians from the Landeskapelle Eisenach transferred to the Thüringen Philharmonie Gotha-Eisenach. On 7 September 2017, the merged orchestra gave its first entitlement concert at the Stadthalle Gotha under the motto "Music in Fusion".

== Profile ==
The Thuringia Philharmonic Orchestra Gotha-Eisenach gives mainly symphonic concerts, occasionally also chamber music concerts at the two locations Gotha and Eisenach. It takes over the musical part of opera and ballet performances and accompaniment at choral concerts.

In addition to several concert series in Gotha, the Thuringia Philharmonic Orchestra held the annual "Whitsun Festival" at Friedenstein Palace in Gotha in the Ekhof-Theater, the oldest completely preserved palace theatre in the world. In 2001, on the occasion of the 350th anniversary of the founding of the Gotha Court Orchestra - whose tradition was continued by the Thuringia Philharmonic Orchestra Gotha-Suhl - the Baroque Festival was newly introduced, which has since been organised annually by the Friedenstein Palace Gotha Foundation. In addition, the orchestra has made a name for itself nationwide through its regular performances of major church music works in collaboration with various church choirs..

In December 2014, Michaela Barchevitch became the orchestra's Executive Director. In the 2017/2018 season, Russell Harris was interim principal conductor. Since September 2019, Markus Huber has been principal Conductor. First concertmasters are Alexej Barchevitch and Seth Taylor.

=== Guest conductors and soloists ===
In recent seasons, the orchestra has appeared with a number of guest conductors and soloists in its symphonic, special and historically informed concert programmes. Charles Olivieri-Munroe conducted concerts including Beethoven's Ninth Symphony with vocal soloists Hyerim Kim, Jolana Slavikova, Dongwon Kang and Jung Jaehong, and the mandolinist Alon Sariel as soloist in a premiere by Nimrod Borenstein. He also conducted a programme with the violinist Esther Yoo, including Samuel Barber's Violin Concerto. Another concert under Olivieri-Munroe featured the violinist Ivan Ženatý in Dvořák's Violin Concerto.

The orchestra's programmes have also included appearances by the conductor Yalchin Adigezalov with the violinist Fabiola Kim and the flautist Giuseppe Nova, and by Conrad van Alphen with the violinist Maria Solozobova and the pianist Martin Stadtfeld in a Beethoven programme. Van Alphen also conducted a guest performance at the Tonhalle Zürich with Solozobova, the flautist Tommaso Benciolini and the harpist Antonella De Franco. In the orchestra's later programmes, Nayden Todorov conducted concerts including works by Glinka, Mendelssohn, Chen Gang, He Zhanhao and Tchaikovsky, with Maria Solozobova and Sherry Tse as violin soloists. Other guest artists have included the conductor and composer Benjamin Yusupov with Maria Solozobova in a Tchaikovsky programme, and the pianist and conductor Alexei Kornienko, who appeared as both soloist and musical director in a prizewinners' concert of the Eisenach International Bach Composition Competition.

The Baroque orchestra of the Thüringen Philharmonie Gotha-Eisenach has worked with historically informed performers including Midori Seiler, who appeared as solo violinist and musical director, and the recorder player and conductor Maurice Steger, who appeared as soloist and director in Barock imPuls concerts. In a concert at the Georgenkirche Eisenach, Seiler led the ensemble and performed as solo violinist together with the countertenor Valer Sabadus and the oboist Saskia Fikentscher.

== Recordings ==
The Thüringen Philharmonie Gotha has recorded a large number of CDs. The CD series Musik am Gothaer Hof (Music at the Gotha Court) has received several awards: it presents composers such as Georg Anton Benda, Andreas Romberg, Johann Ludwig Böhner, Louis Spohr and other personalities of Gotha's musical life in the 17th and 18th centuries.

- Musik am Gothaer Hof - Anton Schweitzer (arias and orchestral works) by Stejskal, Breuer, Thuringia Philharmonic Orchestra and Anton Schweitzer (Audio-CD - 2011)
- Musik am Gothaer Hof - Andreas Romberg by Hermann Breuer, Andreas J. Romberg and Thuringia Philharmonic Orchestra Gotha-Suhl (Audio-CD - 2011)
- Musik am Gothaer Hof - Georg Anton Benda (orchestral works and solo concertos) by Masurenko, Plagge, Breuer and Thuringia Philharmonic Orchestra (Audio-CD - 2011)
- Musik am Gothaer Hof – Vol. 1 by Barschewitsch, Breuer, Thüringen Philharmonie and Johann Ludwig Böhner (Audio-CD - 2011)
- Musik am Gothaer Hof – Vol. 2 by Thunemann, Breuer, Thüringen Philharmonie and Johann Ludwig Böhner (Audio-CD - 2011)
- Musik am Gothaer Hof - Louis Spohr Double Concertos by Hermann Breuer, Antje Weithaas and Michael Sanderling (Audio-CD - 2011)
- Clarinet Concerto 1 and 2 and Op. 2 by Gerhard & Thüringen Philharmonie Suhl Amann (Audio-CD - 2011)
- Piano Concerto 1 and 2 by Julian Evans & Thüringen Philharm.Suhl (Audio-CD - 2011)
- Mozart and Salieri by Roberto Sacca, Thomas Mohr and Nikolai Rimsky-Korssakoff (Audio-CD - 2003)
- Teatro Musicale-Vol. 3 by Taha, Keuper, Mulder and Näck (Audio-CD - 2003) - Double CD
- First Symphony / Toccata by Peter Jona Korn (Audio-CD - 2002) - Import
- Weimar Time Travels in Music by Various (Audio CD - 1999) - Double CD
- Music for Saxophone by Detlef Bensmann and Dietrich Erdmann (Audio-CD - 1996)
- Symphony 1 / Cockaigne Ouverture by Stephen Somary and Edward Elgar (Audio-CD - 1996)
