= Juliane Reichardt =

Pianist, singer and composer (1752–1783)

- Born: Juliane Benda; 14 May 1752; Potsdam, Kingdom of Prussia
- Died: 11 May 1783 (aged 30); Berlin
- Spouse: Johann Friedrich Reichardt
- Parents: Franz Benda (father); Franziska Louise Eleonore Stephanie (mother)

Juliane Reichardt, née Benda (14 May 1752 – 9 or 11 May 1783), was a pianist, singer and composer from the Kingdom of Prussia.

== Biography ==
Reichardt was born in Potsdam, the youngest of the six children of violinist and composer Franz Benda (1709–1786), who was concert master at the court of Frederick II. Her mother was Franziska Louise Eleonore Benda (née Stephanie) (1718–1758). Her older sister Maria Caroline Wolf (née Benda) (1742–1820) was later also a well-known singer, pianist and composer. She took music lessons from her father and appeared in concerts in Berlin as a singer and pianist. She married writer and composer Johann Friedrich Reichardt (1752–1815) in 1776 and had a three children, the second of whom was Louise Reichardt (1779–1826). After her marriage with Johann Friedrich Reichardt, the couple moved to Berlin, from there onwards to Hamburg, Weimar and Königsberg. Juliane Reichardt died of puerperal fever in Berlin.

Since 1733, Franz Benda was in the service of the Prussian Crown Prince, later Frederick II, who initially resided in Ruppin and after his enthronement in Potsdam in 1740. The Benda family lived in the small Potsdam, suburb of Nowawes, where Juliane Benda (later Reichardt) grew up with her siblings in a rural environment. Franz Benda was an extremely versatile and highly regarded musician. He composed, was a sought-after violin virtuoso and a practiced singer, and gave both violin and vocal lessons. From him Juliane Benda received singing and piano lessons. In the house of Benda, many highly regarded personalities visited, among others the famous music and travel writer Charles Burney and the composer and music writer Johann Friedrich Reichardt. Johann Friedrich Reichardt's impressions of his first stay in Potsdam were later confirmed in his "Autobiographical Sketches" (a stylistic feature of this text is that Reichardt wrote about himself in the third person.):

"On the house of the excellent, old concertmaster Benda in Potsdam The traveler made a most enjoyable acquaintance. He was well-received by the entire family, and made him hear many things that further strengthened his love and respect for the great Benda school. [...] The youngest daughter, Juliane, sang with a beautiful, pure voice, and an Italian, expressive manner. The impressions which I have already taken from this house have then exercised decisive influence on my whole life."

Apparently Reichardt's interest in the young singer Juliane Benda already went beyond a purely professional one at that time. After performing at one of his concerts, he dedicated the performance to Juliane, professing his love to her. The only obstacle to a connection was Reichardt's uncertain position. And so it was soon settled that his father's friend, Franz Benda, was working for Reichardt with the Prussian King Frederick II, (Frederick the Great), when he applied for the office of Court Court Master in 1775. On the first Christmas holiday of 1775, Johann Friedrich Reichardt was officially presented to the Prussian king and finally appointed court master. The wedding of the couple took place on 23 November 1776 and was obviously an event of great importance in Berlin, which was still a few months later, in the educated circles.

In October 1777, her first son, Friedrich Wilhelm, was born. Her second child Louise Reichardt was born on 11 April 1779. She was later to follow in the footsteps of her father and her mother, and as a song composer, vocal pedagogue, and chorus, which she was given great prestige. With both children the couple traveled to Weimar in 1780 and met Caroline and Johann Gottfried Herder. Herder reported on the visit of the family to his friend Johann Georg Hamann: "Eight days on it and in the time of our birthday, an unexpected visit came, Kapellm. It was Reichardt. He was there with his wife, Juliane, and two children over 8 days." Soon, the birth of the third child, Wilhelmine, on 31 March 1783, survived only a few weeks. Juliane later died on 11 May 1783, a few days before her 31st birthday, in Berlin after the childbed fever in the midst of a prestigious career.

== Works ==
According to Grove Music, Reichardt's "Lieder und Klaviersonaten (Hamburg, 1782) contains 17 songs and two sonatas; some 13 other songs appeared during her lifetime in almanacs and in a collection of Oden und Lieder (1779–81) by her husband." An den Mond was perhaps published in one of the almanacs, since the date does not match either the 1782 or 1779-81 collection.

During her lifetime she published two piano sonatas and thirty songs. Her most noted work is:

- Sonata in G Major
  - Sonata in G major - Rondeau Allegro appears on the album Mozart in the Age of Enlightenment, Seth Carlin. (20 December 2006) Magnatune, ASIN: B000TPQSD4

Other titles of some of her work include:

- "Zwei Sonaten für Klavier"
- "Klaviersonata "
- "2 Sonaten fuer Klavier"
- "Das Deutsche Lied : Ein Jahreskreis [auf 1925]"
