= Franz Ignaz von Beecke =

German composer

Franz Ignaz von Beecke (28 October 1733 – 2 January 1803) was a classical music composer born in Wimpfen am Neckar, Holy Roman Empire.

== Life ==
Von Beecke served in the Bavarian Dragoon Regiment of Zollern from 1756, during which time he fought in the Seven Years' War. He served with distinction and was promoted to Captain. He was known at the time chiefly for his great skill in playing the harpsichord, although he composed a wide range of music as well, having studied with Christoph Willibald Gluck. He died in Wallerstein, Germany.

In 1775, von Beecke met the 19-year-old Wolfgang Amadeus Mozart in Munich and the two engaged in a piano playing competition at the well-known inn Zum Schwarzen Adler. The poet and composer Christian Friedrich Daniel Schubart, who was in the audience, wrote in his Teutsche Chronik (27 April 1775) that in his opinion, von Beecke played far better than Mozart: "In Munich last winter I heard two of the greatest clavier players, Mr Mozart and Captain von Beecke. Mozart’s playing had great weight, and he read at sight everything that we put before him. But no more than that; Beecke surpasses him by a long way. Winged agility, grace and melting sweetness."

Von Beecke’s students included Anna von Schaden.

== Selected works ==
=== Stage works ===
- Roland (opera) - 1770?
- Claudine from Villa Bella (singspiel in one act with libretto by Goethe) - 1780
- The jubilee wedding (comic opera in 3 acts with libretto by Weiße) - 1782
- The grape harvest (singspiel in 2 acts) - 1782
- List against List (The Bell) (singspiel) - c.1785
- The heart retains its rights (singspiel) - 1790
- The destroyed pastoral celebration (pastoral) - 1790
- Nina (singspiel) - 1790

=== Instrumental music ===
- 33 symphonies
- 1 sinfonia concertante
- Several piano concertos
- Piano quintet in A minor
- 17 string quartets
- 6 flute quartets
- Numerous works for piano
