= Enchanted Island =

Enchanted Island can refer to:

== Geography ==
- Island of enchantment, one of the names attributed to Puerto Rico
- Enchanted Island Amusement Park, a park in Phoenix, Arizona

== Literature, theatre and film ==
- The Tempest, or The Enchanted Island, a play by John Dryden based on Shakespeare's The Tempest
  - The Enchanted Island, an opera setting of Dryden's play commissioned from various composers by Thomas Shadwell
  - The Enchanted Island (opera), a Baroque pasticcio performed by the Metropolitan Opera in 2011–2012
- The Encantadas, or Enchanted Isles, a novella by Herman Melville whose title refers to another name for the Galapagos Islands
- Enchanted Island (film), a 1958 film starring Dana Andrews
- The Enchanted Island of Yew, a 1903 novel by L. Frank Baum
- The Enchanted Island of Oz, a 1976 novel by Ruth Plumly Thompson
- The Enchanted Isles, an archipelago in J. R. R. Tolkien's fictional world of Middle-earth

== Music ==
- Enchanted Island (song), written by Al Stillman and Robert Allen, popularized by The Four Lads in 1958
- L'Île Enchantée, an 1864 ballet by Arthur Sullivan

== See also ==
- Enchanted Isle, another name for Tahiti Drink
