= Landestheater Gotha =

Former German theatre

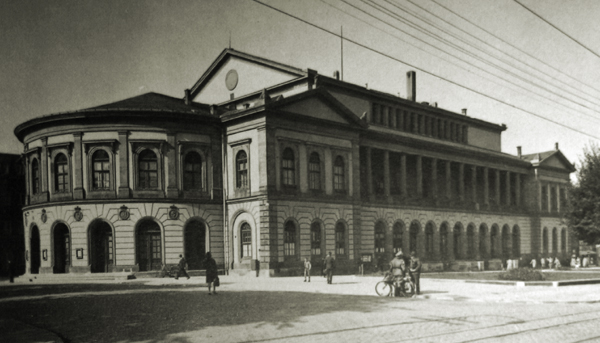
- Gotha Theatre, c. 1900
- Interactive map of Landestheater Gotha
- Location: Gotha, Thuringia, Germany
- Coordinates: 50.94872°N 10.70868°E

Construction
- Opened: 2 January 1840
- Demolished: 1958

The Landestheater Gotha was a neoclassical theatre in Gotha, Thuringia, Germany. It was built in the 1830s as Hoftheater Gotha (Gotha court theatre) and renamed in 1919. The building was destroyed by fire in 1945 during World War II and was demolished in 1958.

== History ==
Design by Schinkel for the Gotha court theatre

Ernest I, Duke of Saxe-Coburg and Gotha, planned two new theatres for his residences in Gotha and Coburg. He fought for his projects with the parliaments of the two areas. The building of the Neues Theater in Gotha, designed in neoclassical style by Karl Friedrich Schinkel, began in 1837. It was erected by the architect Gustav Eberhard. After three years of construction, it was opened on 2 January 1840, the duke's 56th birthday.

The theatre features a foyer, a mirror hall, a hall with three tiers and a stage. It was expanded in 1861/62. A southern expansion held the foyer.

Ernest II initiated a second period of theatre, with a new focus on drama. The company usually played alternating in the two residencies, in Gotha normally from January to end of April, during the duke's attendance at the place. In 1919, the theatre became the Landestheater Gotha.

On 3 April 1945, munition exploded near the theatre, and it was destroyed by fire. The ruin was demolished in 1958, against protest from the citizens and replaced by a highrise building meant as a hotel for a sports event; the highrise was demolished in 1998 and replaced by a department store.
