= Johann Friedrich Reichardt =

German composer and writer (1752–1814)

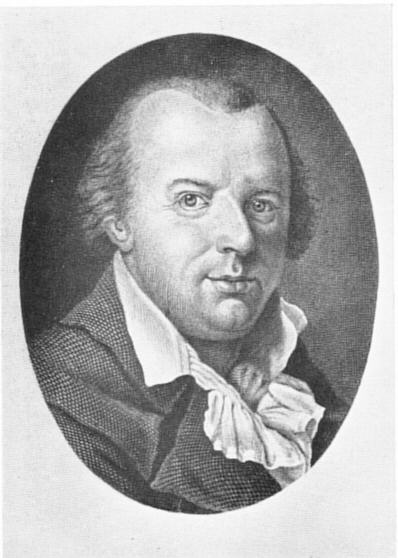
Johann Friedrich Reichardt

Johann Friedrich Reichardt (25 November 1752 – 27 June 1814) was a German composer, writer and music critic.

== Early life ==
Reichardt was born in Königsberg, East Prussia, to lutenist and Stadtmusiker Johann Reichardt (1720–1780). Johann Friedrich began his musical training, in violin, keyboard, and lute, as a child. Reichard's father was a student of Timofey Belogradsky, who in turn was a student of Sylvius Leopold Weiss. When Reichardt was ten years old, his father took the choir in which he sang, the "Wunderknaben", on a concert tour in East Prussia.

After being encouraged by his teacher Immanuel Kant, Reichardt later studied jurisprudence and philosophy in his hometown and in Leipzig from 1769 to 1771. In 1771, he escaped civil service by embarking on a Sturm-und-Drang tour as a virtuoso. He returned to Königsberg in 1774 and became the Kammersekretär (Chamber Secretary) in Ragnit. After Reichardt sent his opera Le feste galanti as a sample piece to Friedrich II, he was appointed to the position of the Royal Prussian Court Kapellmeister, a position previously held by Carl Heinrich Graun.

Two years later, he already withdrew from the job and married the singer, pianist and Lieder composer Juliane Benda, a daughter of Frantisek Benda. Of their progeny was one daughter, Louise Reichardt (11 April 1779, Berlin – 17 November 1826, Hamburg), who became a noted composer and singer, and a son, Wilhelm (1777–1782).

== Later career ==
On the return from his first trip to Italy in 1783, Reichardt stopped in Vienna, where he met Kaiser Joseph II, Wolfgang Amadeus Mozart and Christoph Willibald Gluck. Further musical trips to France and England did not produce anticipated success; he therefore returned reluctantly to Berlin. In 1786, he developed close friendships with Johann Wolfgang von Goethe, Johann Gottfried Herder, Friedrich Schiller and Johann Georg Hamann. A small collection of his writings is in the hands of his family, specifically, Dagmar Reichardt. During a visit to Augsburg in 1789, he met the composers Nannette Streicher and Anna von Schaden.

Further attempts to gain new ground in Paris failed, yet he had become zealous with revolutionary ideas. After the appearance of his Vertrauten Briefe (Intimate Letters) in 1792, he was released in 1794 without pay from his position as Court Kapellmeister for being sympathetic to the French Revolution. He lived first in Hamburg, where he released the journal Frankreich, but from 1794, he lived in Giebichenstein near Halle. In 1796, he was pardoned for his support of the revolution and appointed to the post of the director of the saline (salt mine) in Halle. From there, he often traveled to Berlin to lead the premieres of his compositions.

Another trip to Paris in 1802 lessened his fascination for the French and French politics considerably: he became an opponent of Napoleon. Four years later, when his manor was plundered by French troops, he fled to Danzig where he was active as a patriot and freedom fighter. Napoleon's brother Jérôme, located in Kassel, allowed Reichardt to return and named him to Theater Director in 1807. This lasted only nine months. In November 1808, he traveled to Vienna looking for success. After experiencing the music of Haydn, Mozart and Beethoven, he became receptive to Viennese Classical music, although he was too late. However, he soon returned to Giebichenstein where he died alone, from a gastric illness. His stage works were quickly forgotten after his death but his strophic Lieder and Ballads im Volkston (in folk style) enjoyed considerable popularity beyond the 19th century, aided by the Wandervogel movement.

== Works ==
Much of Reichardt's reputation as a composer rests on his Lieder that number about 1,500, using texts by some 125 poets. Important among these are the settings of Goethe's texts, some of which were known to, and influenced, Schubert. His setting of "Bunt sind schon die Wälder" is still popular. He was also known by his Singspiele, a genre that he refined with Goethe's support. He also wrote 49 songs to Herder's texts. Aside from his music, his work as an essayist has maintained its value up to this day. The collection of poems Des Knaben Wunderhorn is, in the epilogue, dedicated to Reichardt. This was probably in the expectation that he would set the text to music. However, such a setting from Reichardt was never composed.

=== Stage works ===
See List of works for the stage by Johann Friedrich Reichardt.

=== Writings ===
- Briefe eines aufmerksamen Reisenden, die Musik betreffend (1774–76) (Letters of an observant traveler, as it pertains to music)
- Über die deutsche komische Oper (1774) (About German Comic opera)
- Musikalische Kunstmagazin (1781–1792) (Musical Art Magazine)
- Studien für Tonkünstler und Musikfreunde (1793) (Studies for musicians and music enthusiasts)
- Vertraute Briefe aus Paris (1804) (Intimate letters from Paris)
- Vertraute Briefe aus Wien (1810) (Intimate letters from Vienna)
- Other writings on music and his travels

== Sources ==
- Warrack, John and West, Ewan (1992), The Oxford Dictionary of Opera, 782 pages, ISBN 0-19-869164-5
