= Friedrich Fleischmann =

German composer (1766–1798)

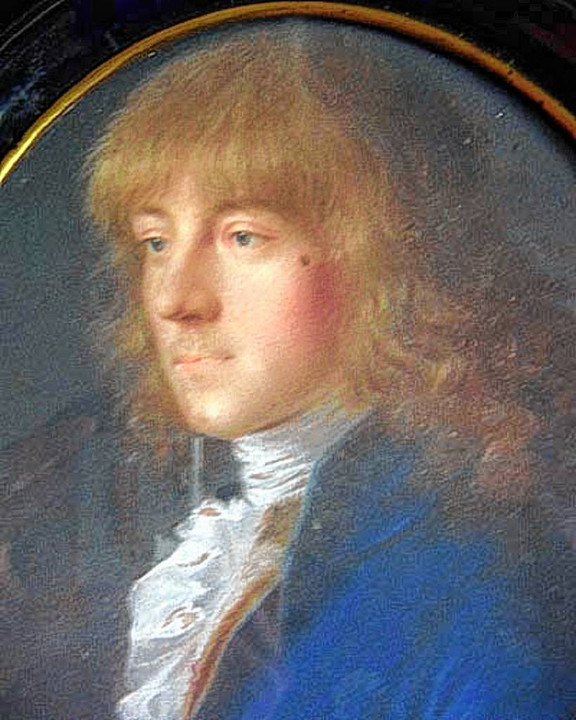
Friedrich Fleischmann.

Johann Friedrich Anton Fleischmann (19 July 1766 – 30 November 1798) was a German composer.

== Life and career ==
Born at Marktheidenfeld, Fleischmann studied at Mannheim with Ignaz Holzbauer and Georg Joseph Vogler before going to the University of Würzburg. He then became private secretary and tutor to the Regierungs-präsident at Regensburg in 1786, before going on to be cabinet secretary to Georg I, Duke of Saxe-Meiningen. In 1792, he married Johanna Christiane Louise von Schulthes (1771–1856, daughter of Johann Adolf von Schultes), in Themar, Thüringen. They had several children.

He composed orchestral and chamber works, songs and singspiele. His main work was the singspiel Die Geisterinsel after Shakespeare's The Tempest, that premiered in 1798 in Weimar.

According to Goretzki/Krickenberg (see sources below), the song "Schlafe mein Prinzchen Schlaf ein", often attributed to Mozart (KV 350) or Bernhard Flies, was composed by Fleischmann.

He died in Meiningen.

== Successors ==
His son W. Th. Fleischmann (1794–1886), had a son F. C. W. Alexander J. Fleischmann (1826–1891). Alexander J. Fleischmann translated the book Looking Backward by Edward Bellamy into German. („Ein Rückblick aus dem Jahre 2000 auf das Jahr 1887“, Wiegand, Leipzig 1890). During one year, seven editions were printed.

B. A. Johanna Müller (artist name: Müller-Koburg, 1860–1947), daughter of Alexander Fleischmann, was a writer, painter and translator; she painted landscapes (Baltic Sea, Berlin, Coburg and the artist colony Ahrenshoop).

== Bibliography ==
- Rönnau, Klaus: "Fleischmann, Friedrich", in The New Grove Dictionary of Opera, ed. Stanley Sadie (London, 1992), ISBN 0-333-73432-7
- E. Goretzki and D. Krickenberg: "Das Wiegenlied 'von Mozart'", in Mitteilungen der Internationalen Stiftung Mozarteum (Salzburg, July 1988), p. 114ff.
