= Friedrich Wilhelm Gotter =

German poet and dramatist (1746–1797)

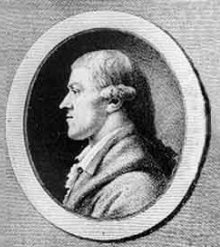

Friedrich Wilhelm Gotter (3 September 1746 – 18 March 1797) was a German poet, dramatist, and opera librettist.

== Biography ==
He was born at Gotha. He started out studying law, but early on was influenced to write for the theatre. After the completion of his university course at Göttingen, he was appointed second director of the Gotha Archive. He subsequently went to Wetzlar, the seat of the imperial law courts, as secretary to the Saxe-Coburg-Gotha legation. In 1768 he returned to Gotha as tutor to two young noblemen, and here, together with H. C. Boie, he founded the famous Göttinger Musenalmanach. In 1770 he was once more in Wetzlar, where he belonged to Goethe's circle. Four years later he returned to live permanently in Gotha, where he worked until his death.

== Work ==
Gotter was the chief representative of French taste in the German literary life of his time. According to the Encyclopædia Britannica Eleventh Edition, his poetry is elegant and polished, and largely free from the trivialities of the Anacreontic lyric of the earlier generation of imitators of French literature; but he lacked imaginative depth.

In 1772 Gotter wrote his first libretto for the comic opera Die Dorfgala with music by composer Anton Schweitzer. He followed this with a second operatic farce, Der Jahrmarkt (1775), with music by Georg Benda. His plays, of which Merope (1774), an adaptation in blank verse of the tragedies of Maffei and Voltaire, and Medea (1775), a melodrama, are best known, were mostly based on French originals and had considerable influence in counteracting the formlessness and irregularity of the Sturm und Drang drama.Medea also served as a libretto for another opera by Benda (1778). Gotter also wrote the libretti to five more operas by Benda: Walder (1776), Romeo und Julie (1776), Der Holzhauer oder Die drey Wünsche (1778), Pygmalion (1779), and Das tartarische Gesetz (1787). He also wrote the libretto to Johann Rudolf Zumsteeg's Das tartarische Gesetz (1780) which was based on William Shakespeare's The Tempest.

Gotter's collected Gedichte appeared in 2 vols. in 1787 and 1788; a third volume (1802) contains his Literarischer Nachlass. See B. Litzmann, Schröder und Gotter (1887), and R. Schlösser, F. W. Gotter, sein Leben und seine Werke (1894).

His best known work is the lyrics to the well known lullaby Schlafe, mein Prinzchen, Schlaf ein.
