= Opera in German =

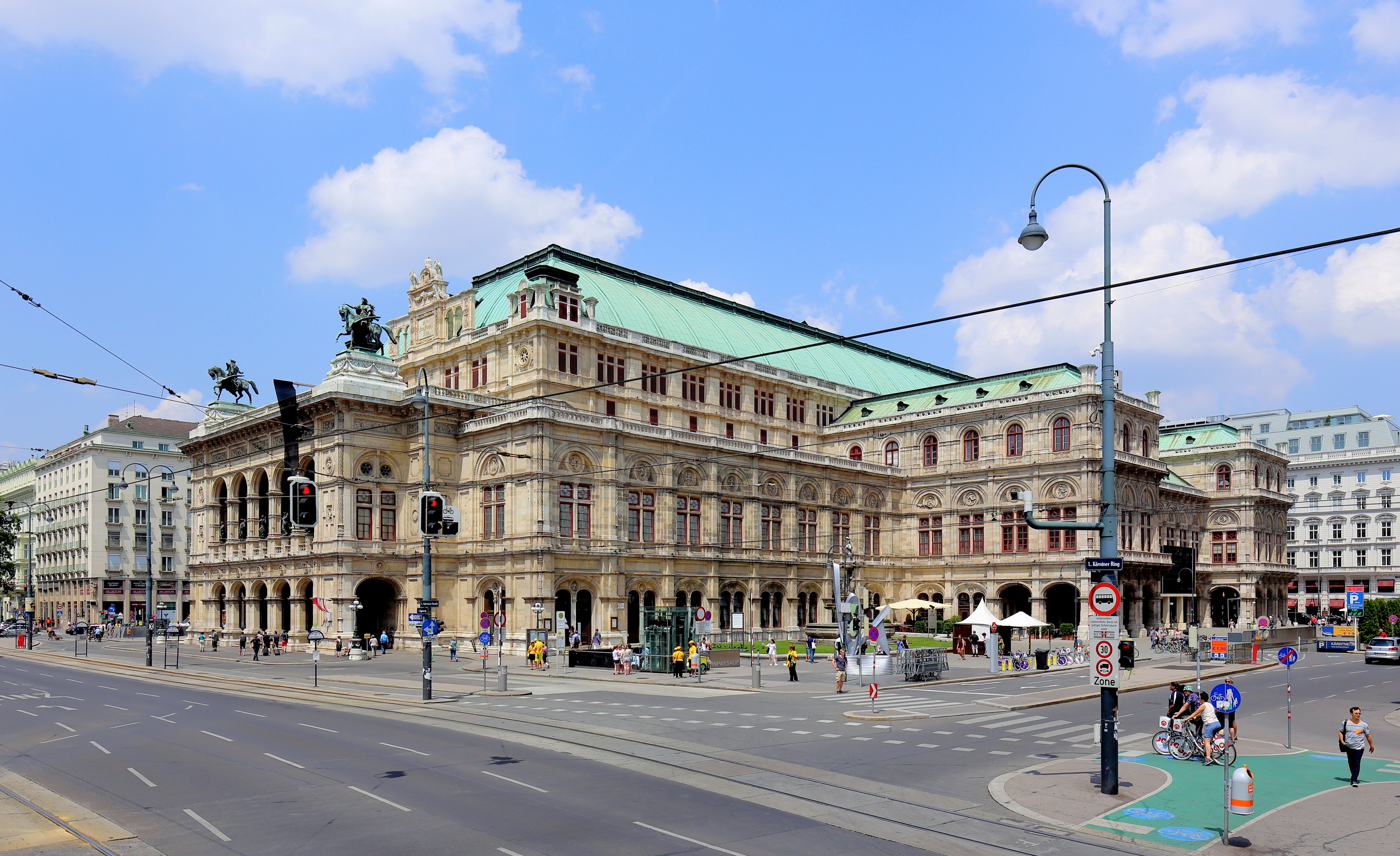
Vienna State Opera

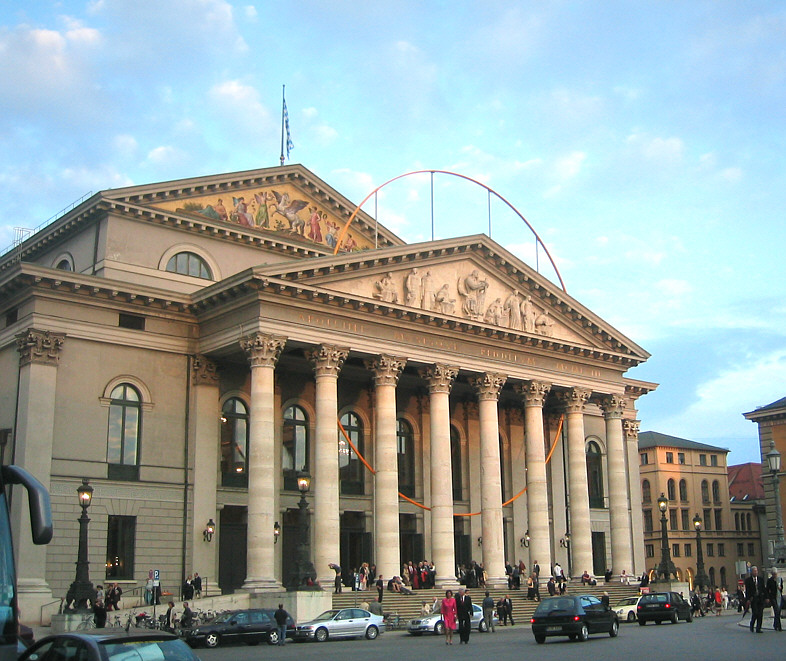
National Theatre Munich, home of the Bavarian State Opera

Opera appeared in the German language quickly after the birth of opera itself in Italy. The first Italian opera was Jacopo Peri's Dafne of 1598. In 1627, Heinrich Schütz provided the music for a German translation of the same libretto. Yet during much of the 17th and 18th centuries German-language opera would struggle to emerge from the shadow of its Italian-language rival, with leading composers from German-speaking parts of Europe, such as George Frideric Handel and Christoph Willibald Gluck, opting to work in foreign traditions such as opera seria.

Some Baroque composers, such as Reinhard Keiser, did try to challenge Italian dominance, and the theatre principal Abel Seyler became an eager promoter of German opera in the 1770s, but it was only with the appearance of Mozart that a lasting tradition of serious German-language opera was established. Mozart took the simple, popular genre of Singspiel and turned it into something far more sophisticated. Beethoven followed his example with the idealistic Fidelio; and with Der Freischütz of 1821, Weber established a uniquely German form of opera under the influence of Romanticism. Weber's innovations were eclipsed by those of Wagner, one of the most revolutionary and controversial figures in musical history. Wagner strove to achieve his ideal of opera as "music drama", eliminating all distinction between aria and recitative, employing a complex web of leitmotifs and vastly increasing the power and richness of the orchestra. Wagner also drew on Germanic mythology in his huge operatic cycle Der Ring des Nibelungen.

After Wagner, opera could never be the same again, so great was his influence. The most successful of his followers was Richard Strauss. Opera flourished in German-speaking lands in the early 20th century in the hands of figures such as Hindemith, Busoni and Weill until Adolf Hitler's seizure of power forced many composers into silence or exile. After World War II young opera writers were inspired by the example of Schoenberg and Berg who had pioneered modernist techniques such as atonality and serialism in the earlier decades of the century. Composers at work in the field of opera today include Hans Werner Henze.

As the names of Mozart, Weber, Wagner, Richard Strauss and Berg indicate, Germany and Austria have one of the strongest operatic traditions in European culture. This is also evidenced by the large number of opera houses, particularly in Germany where almost every major city has its own theatre for staging such works, as well as internationally renowned operatic events such as the Salzburg Festival.

== Baroque era ==
=== Birth ===
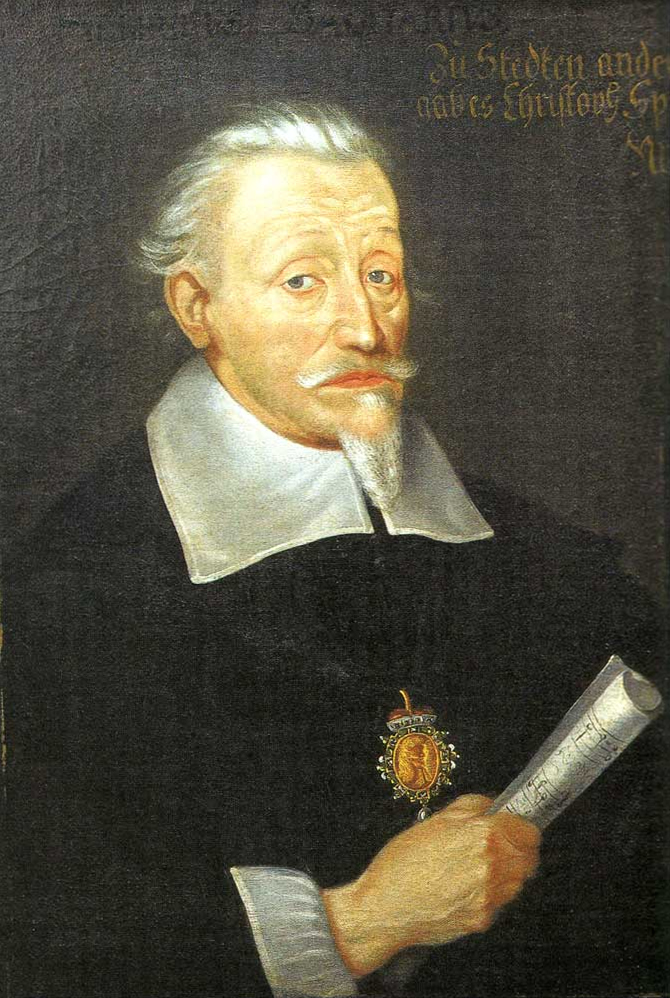
Heinrich Schütz

The world's first opera was Dafne by Jacopo Peri, which appeared in Florence in 1598. Three decades later Heinrich Schütz set the same libretto in a translation by the poet Martin Opitz, thus creating the first ever German-language opera. The music to Schütz's Dafne is now lost and details of the performance are sketchy, but it is known to have been written to celebrate the marriage of Landgrave Georg II of Hessen-Darmstadt to Princess Sophia Eleonora of Saxony in Torgau in 1627. As in Italy, the first patrons of opera in Germany and Austria were royalty and the nobility, and they tended to favour composers and singers from south of the Alps. Antonio Cesti was particularly successful, providing the huge operatic extravaganza Il pomo d'oro for the imperial court in Vienna in 1668. Opera in Italian would continue to exercise a considerable sway over German-speaking lands throughout the Baroque and Classical periods. Nevertheless, native forms were developing too. In Nuremberg in 1644, Sigmund Staden produced the "spiritual pastorale", Seelewig, which foreshadows the Singspiel, a genre of German-language opera in which arias alternate with spoken dialogue. Seelewig was a moral allegory inspired by the example of contemporary school dramas and is the first German opera whose music has survived.

=== Hamburg 1678–1738 ===
Another important development was the founding of the Theater am Gänsemarkt in Hamburg in 1678, aimed at the local middle classes who preferred opera in their own language. The new opera house opened with a performance of Johann Theile's Der erschaffene, gefallene und aufgerichtete Mensch, based on the story of Adam and Eve. The theatre, however, would come to be dominated by the works of Reinhard Keiser, an enormously prolific composer who wrote over a hundred operas, sixty of them for Hamburg. Initially, the works performed in Hamburg had all been on religious themes in an attempt to ward off criticisms by Pietist church authorities that the theatre was immoral, but Keiser and fellow composers such as Johann Mattheson broadened the range of subject matter to include the historical and the mythological. Keiser drew on foreign operatic traditions, for instance he included dances after the model of the French tradition of Lully. The recitative in his operas was always in German so the audience could follow the plot, but from Claudius in 1703 he began to include arias in Italian which allowed for florid vocal display. The hallmark of the Hamburg style was its eclecticism. Orpheus (1726) by Telemann contains arias in Italian setting texts taken from famous Handel operas as well as choruses in French to words originally set by Lully. Hamburg opera might also include comic characters (Keiser's Der Carneval von Venedig of 1707 has them speaking in the local Lower Saxon dialect), marking a great contrast to the elevated new style of opera seria as defined by Metastasio. Yet the immediate future belonged to Italian opera. The most famous German-born opera composer of the era, Handel, wrote four operas for Hamburg at the beginning of his career but soon moved on to write opera seria in Italy and England. In 1738, the Theater am Gänsemarkt went bankrupt and the fortunes of serious opera in German went into decline for the next few decades.

Other early opera houses in Germany included the Oper am Brühl in Leipzig and the Opernhaus vorm Salztor in Naumburg in 1701. Both played during the trade fairs in the towns, presenting both German and Italian opera, and a combination of both. While the house in Leipzig was financed by the town of Leipzig, the house in Naumburg was initiated and supported by the ruler, Moritz Wilhelm, Duke of Saxe-Zeitz, but offered public performances.

=== Opera seria, Singspiel, melodrama, early serious German opera ===
Theatre director Abel Seyler, a major promoter of German opera who pioneered serious German opera in the 1770s

The other leading German composers of the time tended to follow Handel's example. This was because the courts of the various German states favoured opera in Italian. In 1730 the chief proponent of opera seria, the Italian librettist Metastasio, took up residence as the imperial poet in Vienna. Johann Adolph Hasse wrote operas in Italian for the court of the Elector of Saxony in Dresden. Hasse also wrote operas for the court of Frederick the Great in Berlin, as did Carl Heinrich Graun. The king himself supplied the libretto for Graun's Montezuma, first performed in 1755.

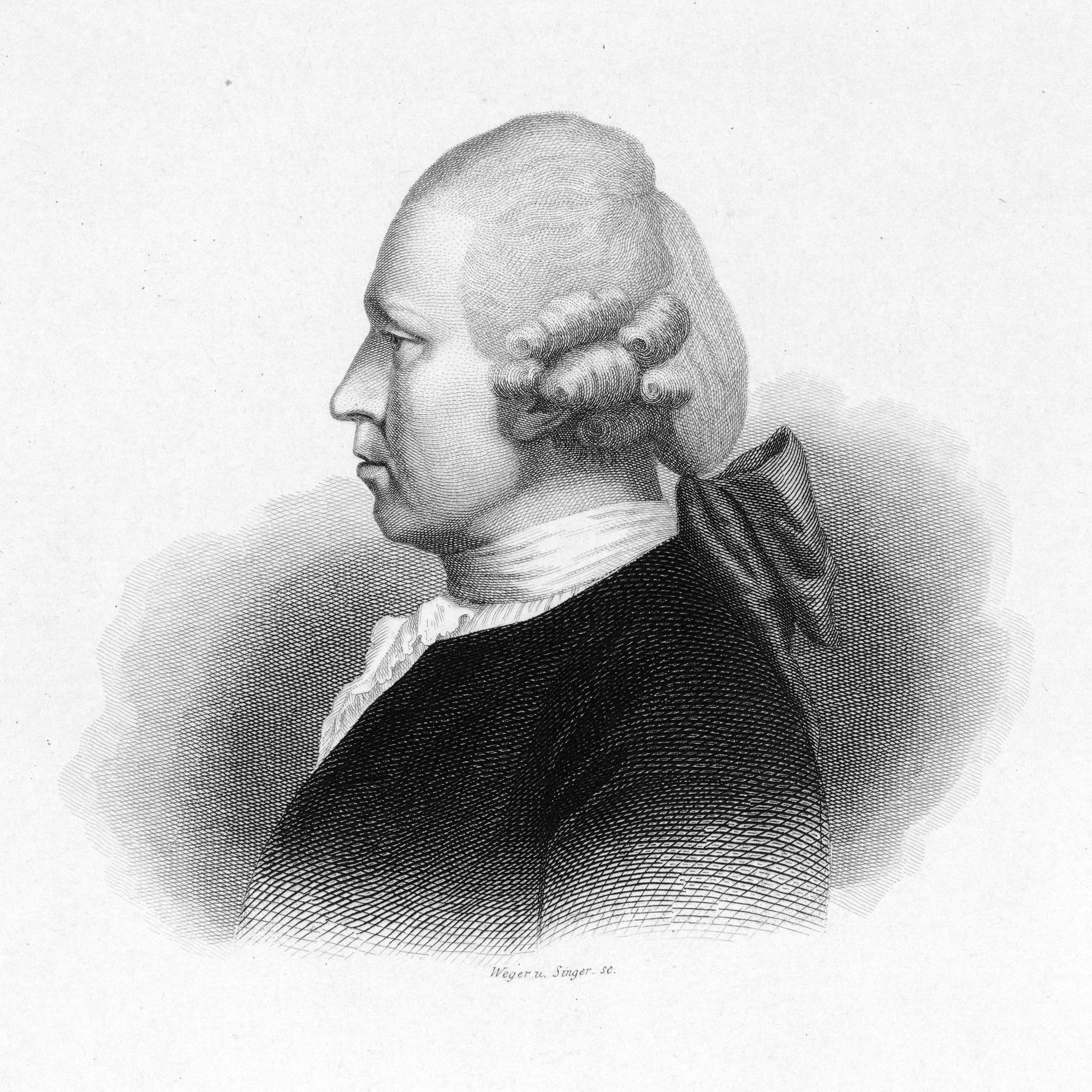
Johann Adam Hiller

Deprived of aristocratic patronage until the mid-1770s, opera in German was forced to look to the general public to survive. This meant theatrical companies had to tour from town to town. The Singspiel became the most popular form of German opera, especially in the hands of the composer Johann Adam Hiller. Hiller's 1766 reworking of the Singspiel Die verwandelten Weiber was a landmark in the history of the genre, although his most famous work would be Die Jagd (1770). These Singspiele were comedies mixing spoken dialogue and singing, influenced by the similar genres of the ballad opera in England and the opéra comique in France. Often having sentimental plots and extremely simple music, Singspiele were no match for contemporary opera serias in artistic sophistication.

The 1770s marked an important decade in the history of German-language opera. The theatre company of Abel Seyler pioneered serious German-language opera, and Seyler commissioned operas by Hiller, Georg Benda, Anton Schweitzer and other composers. A milestone of German opera was Schweitzer's Alceste, with a libretto by Wieland and commissioned by Seyler, which premiered in 1773 in Weimar. Alceste was called "a model for German opera" by Ernst Christoph Dressler and has been described as the first serious German opera. It was also in the 1770s that composers, like Benda, began experimenting with melodrama, a type of music theatre which some commentators saw as a viable alternative to opera. Early melodramas that proved popular with theatre troupes throughout German-speaking Europe included Benda's Ariadne auf Naxos and Medea (both premiered in 1775). Other important contributions to a growing repertoire of German operas appeared shortly after. This includes Günther von Schwarzburg, a through-composed opera noted then as now for its topic taken from German history, by composer Ignaz Holzbauer and librettist Anton Klein which premiered in 1777. An increasing amount of operas originally set to Italian and French texts by composers like André Ernest Modeste Grétry were translated and adopted for performance in German. By the end of the decade, German opera could be heard throughout Central Europe owing in part to travelling theatres and German states that began supporting Nationaltheater that further developed the repertoire, such as those founded in Mannheim and Vienna. Alongside those already mentioned above, notable composers of German-language opera from the 1770s and 1780s include Johann André, Carl Ditters von Dittersdorf, Christian Gottlob Neefe, Ignaz Umlauf, and Ernst Wilhelm Wolf. With successful works that appeared on stages across Germany, like Der Doktor und Apotheker, Ditters was a particularly successful composer of German opera between the mid-1780s and mid-1790s.

== Classical era ==
=== Mozart's Singspiele ===
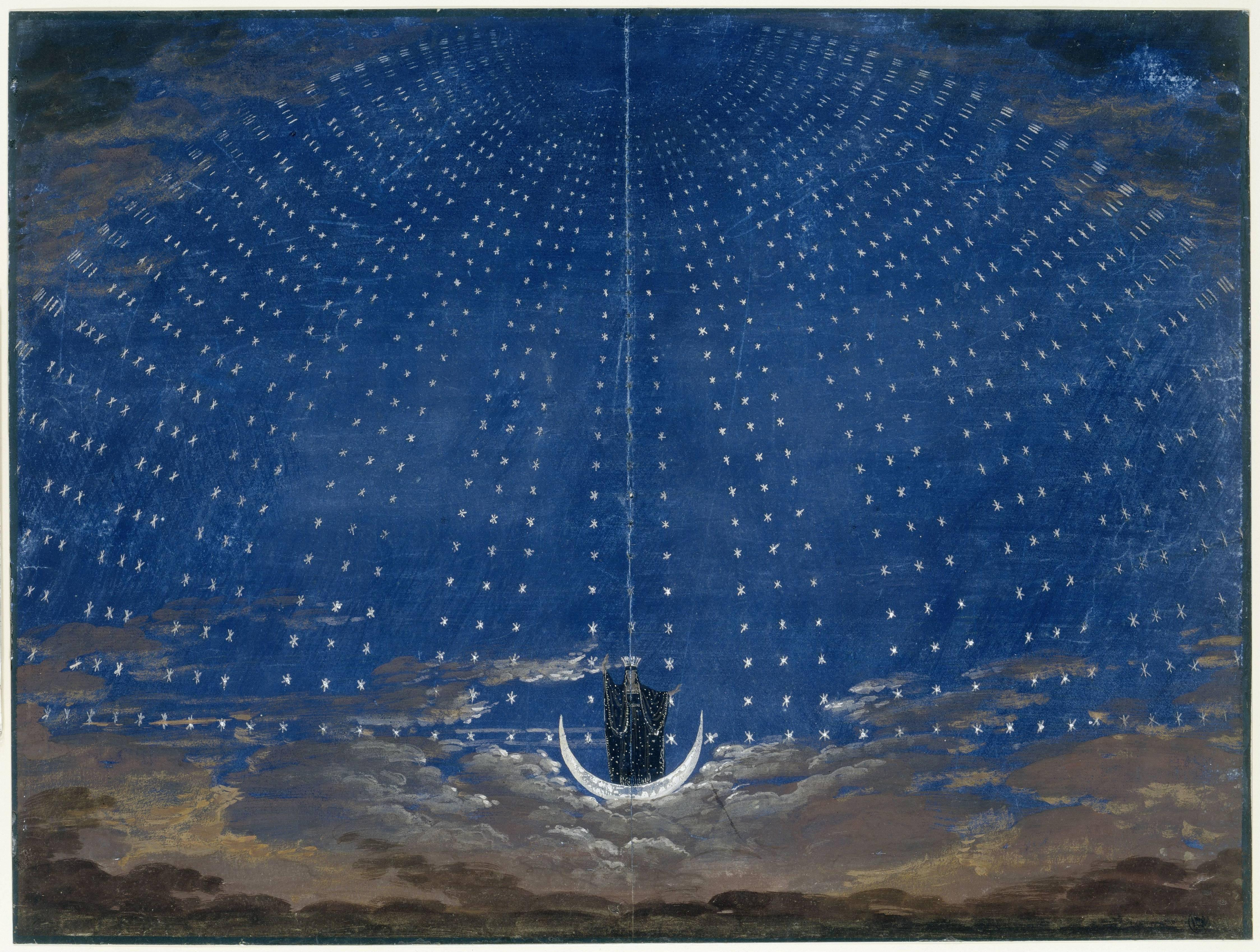
Stage set for The Magic Flute, 1815

At the end of the 18th century, a composer who would permanently change the German operatic tradition would emerge: Wolfgang Amadeus Mozart. The great figure of the early Classical period was Christoph Willibald Gluck but his pioneering reforms were directed at Italian and French opera, not the German repertoire. In 1778, Emperor Joseph II attempted to change this state of affairs by establishing a German-language opera troupe, the National Singspiel, at the Burgtheater in Vienna. The experiment was short-lived and the troupe was dissolved in 1783, yet the previous year it had produced one undoubted success with Die Entführung aus dem Serail by the young Mozart. Goethe immediately recognised the quality of the piece, declaring "it knocked us all sideways". In the following years commercial theatres sprang up in Vienna offering German-language opera. The impresario Emanuel Schikaneder had particular success with his Theater auf der Wieden on the outskirts of the city. In 1791, Mozart set one of his libretti, The Magic Flute. Although it appeared in the context of other popular Viennese magic operas (Zauberopern), like Wenzel Müller's Der Fagottist, Mozart's proved to be no ordinary Singspiel. Though the traditional farcical elements remained, Mozart added a new seriousness, particularly in the music for Sarastro and his priests. Even more than Die Entführung, the Magic Flute pointed the way forward for future German opera, especially according to later commentators.

=== Beethoven and Fidelio ===
The greatest German composer of the next generation, Beethoven, seized on The Magic Flute's blend of domestic comedy and high seriousness for his only opera, Fidelio, the story of a devoted wife who saves her husband from political imprisonment. The years following the French Revolution of 1789 had been some of the most turbulent in European history. In Fidelio, Beethoven wanted to express the ideals of that Revolution: liberty, equality and fraternity. He was also inspired by contemporary French works, particularly the rescue operas of Luigi Cherubini. Beethoven was arguably not a natural composer of opera and, although Fidelio was premiered in 1805, it was not until 1814 that he produced its final version. Nevertheless, Fidelio is widely regarded as a masterpiece and is one of the key works in the German repertoire.

== German Romantic opera ==
=== Early Romanticism ===
In the early years of the nineteenth century, the vast cultural movement known as Romanticism began to exert an influence over German composers. The Romantics showed a keen interest in the Middle Ages as well as German folklore. The fairy tale collections of the Brothers Grimm and the rediscovered Medieval German epic the Nibelungenlied were major sources of inspiration for the movement. There was also often a quest for a distinctively German identity, influenced by the new nationalism which had arisen in the wake of the Napoleonic invasions. Romanticism was already firmly established in German literature with writers such as Tieck, Novalis, Eichendorff and Clemens Brentano. One of the most famous German Romantic authors, E. T. A. Hoffmann, was also a music theorist and a composer in his own right and in 1816 he produced an opera, Undine, in Berlin. Another important early Romantic opera was Faust by Louis Spohr (also 1816). Both Hoffmann and Spohr took the basic form of the Singspiel as their starting point but began to group the individual numbers into extended scenes. They also employed "reminiscence motifs", recurring musical themes associated with characters or concepts in the opera, which would pave the way for Wagner's use of the leitmotif.

=== Weber ===
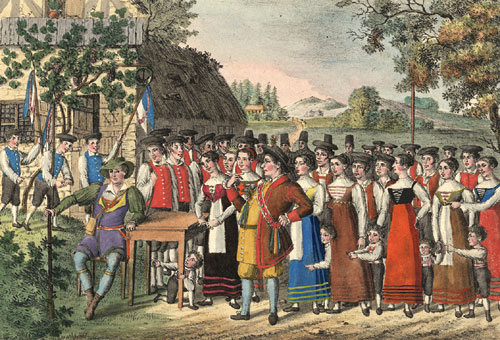
Der Freischütz around 1822

The major breakthrough in the history of German Romantic opera was Der Freischütz by Carl Maria von Weber, premiered in Berlin on 18 June 1821. Weber resented the Europe-wide dominance of the Italian operas of Rossini and wanted to establish a uniquely German style of opera. He turned to German folk songs and folklore for inspiration; Der Freischütz is based on "The Fatal Marksman", a tale from the Gespensterbuch ("Book of Wraiths") of Apel and Laun concerning a marksman who makes a pact with the Devil. Weber's strong point was his striking ability to evoke atmosphere through orchestral colour. From the very first bars of the overture, it is obvious we are in the primeval forests of Germany. The highlight of the opera is the chilling Wolf's Glen Scene in which the hero Max makes his deal with the Devil. Der Freischütz was immensely popular, not only in Germany, but throughout Europe. Weber never really achieved his full potential as an opera composer due to his early death from tuberculosis and his poor choice of libretti. His major German opera after Der Freischütz, Euryanthe (1823), suffers from a particularly weak text and is rarely staged nowadays. Yet Euryanthe marks another important stage in the development of serious German opera. Weber completely eliminated spoken dialogue, producing a "through-composed" work where the distinction between recitative and aria is becoming blurred. Its lessons would not be lost on future composers, including Richard Wagner.

=== Other composers of the time ===
Weber's most important successor in the field of Romantic opera was Heinrich Marschner, who further explored the Gothic and the supernatural in works such as Der Vampyr (1828) and Hans Heiling (1833). On the other hand, it was with comic opera that Albert Lortzing scored his biggest successes. The popularity of pieces such as Zar und Zimmermann continues in Germany today, though Lortzing's operas are rarely staged abroad. Though he began in Germany, Giacomo Meyerbeer was more famous for his contributions to Italian and (especially) French opera. He fused elements from all three national styles into his conception of grand opera, which had an important influence on the development of German music, including Wagner's early works. Other notable operas of the time include Die lustigen Weiber von Windsor (1849) by Otto Nicolai and Martha (1847) by Friedrich von Flotow. Later came Peter Cornelius (Der Barbier von Bagdad, 1858), Hermann Goetz (Der Widerspänstigen Zähmung, 1874) and Karl Goldmark (Die Königin von Saba, 1875).

Mention should be made of two great composers of the era who wrote their major works in other genres yet also composed operas: Franz Schubert and Robert Schumann. Schubert wrote over a dozen operas, mostly in the Singspiel style. Hardly any were performed during the composer's lifetime. Schumann only wrote one opera, Genoveva, first staged in Leipzig in 1850. Though praised by Liszt, it failed to win lasting success. The verdict on both these composer's operas has generally been that, though they contain excellent music, they have too many dramatic weaknesses to be acclaimed as great stage works.

== Wagner ==
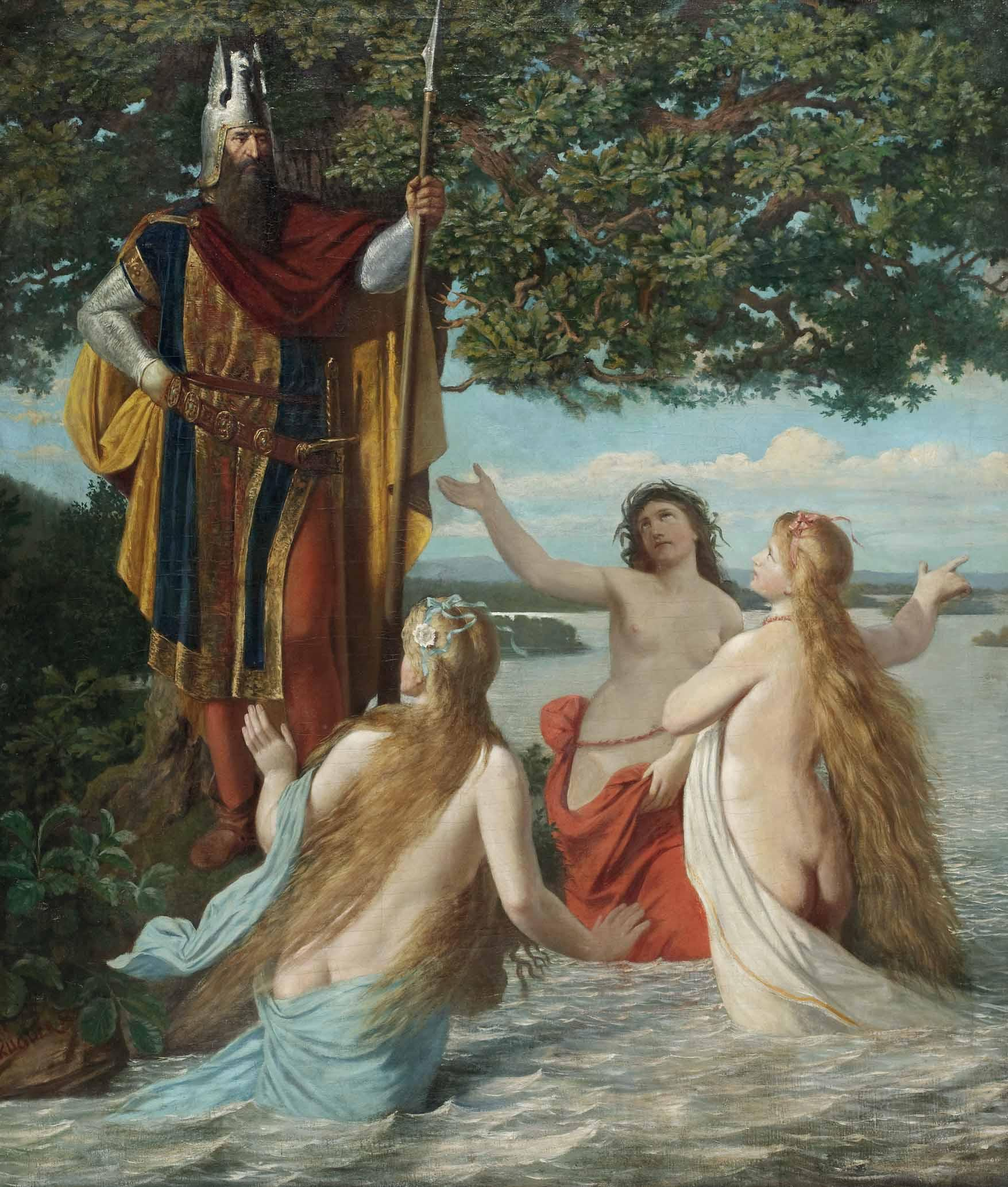
Hagen and three Rhinemaidens in Götterdämmerung (Der Ring des Nibelungen)

Richard Wagner was one of the most revolutionary and controversial composers in musical history and his innovations changed the course of opera, not just in Germany and Austria but throughout Europe. Wagner gradually evolved a new concept of opera as a Gesamtkunstwerk (a "complete work of art"), a fusion of music, poetry and painting. His earliest experiments followed the examples set by Weber (Die Feen and Das Liebesverbot) and Meyerbeer (Rienzi), but his most important formative influence was probably the symphonic music of Beethoven. Wagner believed his career truly began with Der fliegende Holländer (1843). Together with the two works which followed, Tannhäuser and Lohengrin, this has been described as the "zenith of German Romantic opera". Yet these were merely a prelude to even more radical developments. In his mature dramas, Tristan und Isolde, Die Meistersinger von Nürnberg, Der Ring des Nibelungen and Parsifal, Wagner abolished the distinction between aria and recitative in favour of a seamless flow of "endless melody". He greatly increased the role and power of the orchestra, creating scores with a complex web of leitmotifs; and he was prepared to violate accepted musical conventions, such as tonality, in his quest for greater expressivity. Wagner also brought a new philosophical dimension to opera in his works, which were usually based on stories from Germanic or Arthurian legend. Finally, Wagner built his own opera house at Bayreuth, exclusively dedicated to performing his own works in the style he wanted.

== Late Romantic opera ==
=== After Wagner ===
Wagner's innovations cast an immense shadow over subsequent composers, who struggled to absorb his influence while retaining their own individuality. One of the most successful composers of the following generation was Humperdinck, whose Hänsel und Gretel (1893) still has an assured place in the standard repertoire. Humperdinck turned back to folk song and the tales of the Brothers Grimm for inspiration. Yet, though Hänsel is often viewed as the ideal piece for introducing opera to children, it also has extraordinarily sophisticated orchestration and makes great use of leitmotifs, both tell-tale signs of Wagner's influence.

Other composers of the era who tried their hand at opera include Hugo Wolf (Der Corregidor, 1896) and Wagner's own son Siegfried.

=== Richard Strauss ===
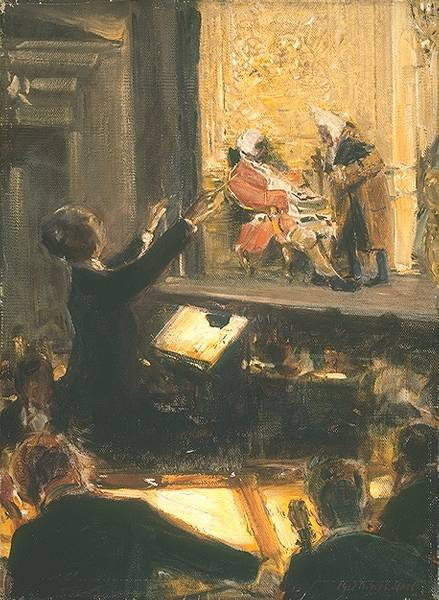
Schuch conducting Der Rosenkavalier (Robert Sterl, 1912)

Richard Strauss was heavily influenced by Wagner, despite his father's efforts to the contrary. By seventeen, he was unimpressed with Tannhäuser, Lohengrin and Siegfried but absolutely entranced by the other three pieces of the Ring and Tristan und Isolde. Although in his early years he was more famous for his orchestral tone poems, Salome (1905) and Elektra (1909) quickly established his reputation as Germany's leading opera composer. These two operas stretched the tonal music system to its breaking point. The highly chromatic music featured harsh dissonances and unresolved harmonies. This, paired with the gruesome subject matter, looked forward to expressionism. Elektra also marked the beginning of Strauss's working relationship with the leading Austrian poet and playwright Hugo von Hofmannsthal, who would provide another five libretti for the composer. With Der Rosenkavalier of 1911, Strauss changed direction, looking towards Mozart and the world of the Viennese waltz as much as towards Wagner. Modernist critics accused him of "selling out", but Rosenkavalier proved an immense success with audiences around the world. Strauss continued to ignore critical fashion, producing the mixture of farce and high tragedy of Ariadne auf Naxos, the complex allegory of Die Frau ohne Schatten, the domestic dramas of Intermezzo and Arabella, and the mythological Die ägyptische Helena and Daphne. Strauss bid farewell to the musical stage with Capriccio of 1942, a "conversation piece" which explores the relationship between words and music in opera.

=== Other late Romantics ===
Other composers styled "late Romantic", such as Franz Schreker (Der ferne Klang, 1912; Der Schatzgräber, 1920), Alexander von Zemlinsky (Eine florentinische Tragödie, 1917; Der Zwerg, 1922) and Erich Korngold (Die tote Stadt, 1920) explored similar territory to Strauss's Salome and Elektra. They combined Wagnerian influences, lush orchestration, strange harmonies and dissonances with "decadent" subject matter reflecting the dominance of Expressionism in the arts and the contemporary psychological explorations of Sigmund Freud. All three composers suffered persecution and eclipse under the Nazis, who condemned their works as entartete Musik ("degenerate music"). Hans Pfitzner was another late Romantic post-Wagnerian, albeit of a more conservative stripe. His major opera Palestrina (1917) makes the case for tradition and inspiration rather than musical modernism.

=== Heyday of operetta ===
In the late nineteenth century, a new, lighter form of opera, operetta, became popular in Vienna. Operettas had immediately attractive tunes, comic (and often frivolous) plots and used spoken dialogue between the musical "numbers". Viennese operetta was inspired by the fashion for the French operettas of Jacques Offenbach. Das Pensionat (1860) by Franz von Suppé is generally regarded as the first important operetta in the German language, but by far the most famous example of the genre is Die Fledermaus (1874) by Johann Strauss. Franz Lehár's The Merry Widow (1905) and Emmerich Kálmán's Die Csárdásfürstin (1915) were other massive hits. Other composers who worked in this style include Oscar Straus and Sigmund Romberg.

== Modernism: Second Viennese School ==
Following the example of Wagner, Richard Strauss, Zemlinsky and Schreker had pushed traditional tonality to the absolute limits. Now a new group of composers appeared in Vienna who wanted to take music beyond. Operatic modernism truly began in the operas of two composers of the so-called Second Viennese School, Arnold Schoenberg and his acolyte Alban Berg, both advocates of atonality and its later development (as worked out by Schoenberg), dodecaphony. Schoenberg's early musico-dramatic works, Erwartung (1909, premiered in 1924) and Die glückliche Hand display heavy use of chromatic harmony and dissonance in general. Schoenberg also occasionally used Sprechstimme, which he described as: "The voice rising and falling relative to the indicated intervals, and everything being bound together with the time and rhythm of the music except where a pause is indicated". Schoenberg intended Moses und Aron as his operatic masterpiece, but it was left unfinished at his death.

The two operas of Schoenberg's pupil Alban Berg, Wozzeck and Lulu (left incomplete at his death) share many of the same characteristics described above, though Berg combined his highly personal interpretation of Schoenberg's twelve-tone technique with melodic passages of a more traditionally tonal nature (quite Mahlerian in character). This perhaps partially explains why his operas have remained in standard repertory, despite their controversial music and plots.

== 1918–1945: Weimar Germany, Inter-war Austria, Third Reich ==
The years following World War I saw German and Austrian culture flourishing in spite of the surrounding political turmoil. Late Romantic composers were still at work alongside the avowed modernists Schoenberg and Berg. The Italian-born Ferruccio Busoni ploughed an individual furrow, attempting to fuse Bach and the avant-garde, Mediterranean and Germanic culture in his music. He never lived to finish his most significant opera Doktor Faust (1925). Paul Hindemith began his operatic career with short, scandalous pieces such as Mörder, Hoffnung der Frauen ("Murder, Hope of Women") before turning to Bach, as Busoni had done. Hindemith saw Bach-inspired "neo-classicism" as a way of curbing the excesses of late Romanticism. Cardillac (1925) was his first work in this vein. Hindemith was also interested in putting contemporary life on the stage in his operas (a concept called Zeitoper), as was Ernst Krenek whose Jonny spielt auf (1927) has a jazz violinist as its hero. Kurt Weill reflected life in Weimar Germany in a more overtly political way. His most famous collaboration with Bertolt Brecht, The Threepenny Opera (1928), was both a scandal and an immense box-office success.

Adolf Hitler's assumption of power destroyed this thriving operatic scene. Ironically, after the burning of the Reichstag in 1933, the German seat of the government was moved to the Kroll Opera House, the state opera house in Berlin which, under the adventurous directorship of Otto Klemperer, had seen the premieres of many innovative works of the 1920s, including Hindemith's Neues vom Tage. Now Hindemith responded to the advent of the Third Reich with his chief work Mathis der Maler, a portrait of an artist trying to survive in hostile times. It received its premiere in Zürich in 1938, since all performances of Hindemith's music had been banned in Germany the previous year. In 1940, Hindemith left Switzerland for the United States, joining a transatlantic exodus of composers which included Schoenberg, Weill, Korngold and Zemlinsky. Schreker had died in 1934, having been dismissed from his teaching post by the Nazis; other composers, such as the promising Viktor Ullmann, would perish in the death camps. Some opera composers, including Carl Orff, Werner Egk and the ageing Richard Strauss, remained in Germany to accommodate with the new regime as best they could.

== Since 1945 ==
Composers writing after World War II had to find a way of coming to terms with the destruction caused by the Third Reich. The modernism of Schoenberg and Berg proved attractive to young composers, since their works had been banned by the Nazis and were free of any taint of the former regime. Bernd Alois Zimmermann looked to the example of Berg's Wozzeck for his only opera Die Soldaten (1965), and Aribert Reimann continued the tradition of expressionism with his Shakespearean Lear (1978). Perhaps the most versatile and internationally famous post-war German opera composer is Hans Werner Henze, who has produced a series of works which mix Bergian influences with those of Italian composers such as Verdi. Examples of his operas are Boulevard Solitude, The Bassarids (to a libretto by W. H. Auden) and Das verratene Meer. Karlheinz Stockhausen set off in an even more avant-garde direction with his enormous operatic cycle based on the seven days of the week, Licht (1977–2003). Giselher Klebe created an extensive body of work in the operatic genre based on literary works. Other leading composers still producing operas today include Wolfgang Rihm and Olga Neuwirth.

== See also ==
- Category:German-language operas
- Category:Opera houses in Austria
- Category:Opera houses in Germany

== Notes and references ==
=== Sources ===
- Bauman, Thomas (1985). North German Opera in the Age of Goethe. Cambridge University Press. ISBN 9780521260275.
- Glatthorn, Austin (2022). Music Theatre and the Holy Roman Empire: The German Musical Stage at the Turn of the Nineteenth Century. Cambridge University Press. doi:10.1017/9781009067485. ISBN 978-1-316-51249-4.
- Grout, Donald Jay (2003). A Short History of Opera (4th ed.). Columbia University Press.
- Holden, Amanda, ed. (1993). The Viking Opera Guide. Viking.
- Parker, Roger, ed. (1994). The Oxford Illustrated History of Opera. Oxford University Press.
- Vernon, David (2021). Disturbing the Universe: Wagner's Musikdrama. Edinburgh: Candle Row Press. ISBN 978-1527299245.
- Zaslaw, Neal, ed. (1989). Man and Music: The Classical Era. Macmillan.
