= Dafne (Opitz-Schütz) =

Opera with libretto by Martin Opitz and lost music by Heinrich Schütz

- Opera by Heinrich Schütz
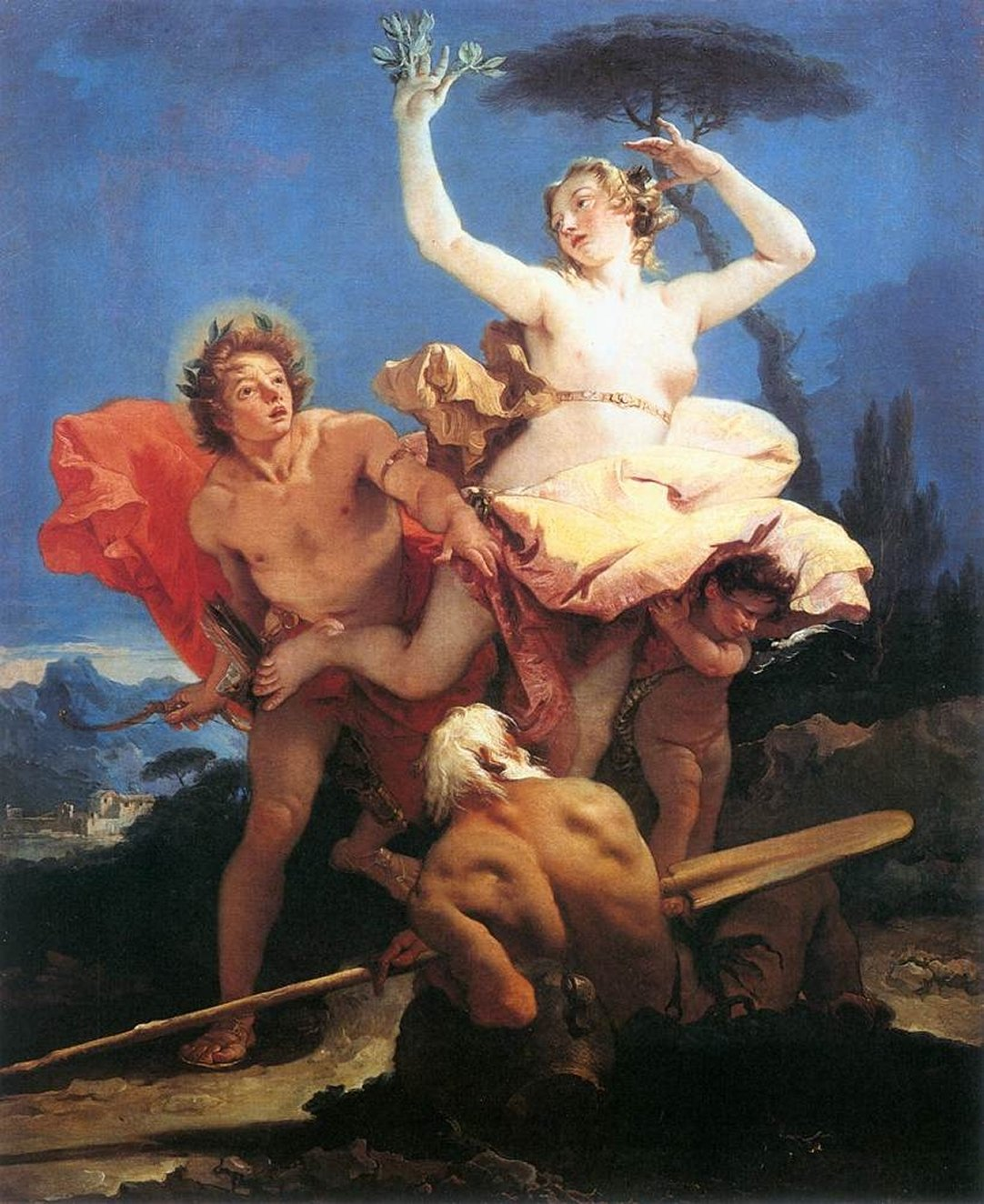
- Daphne Chased by Apollo, by Giovanni Battista Tiepolo, 1744
- Librettist: Martin Opitz
- Language: German
- Based on: Daphne myth
- Premiere: April 13, 1627; Hartenfels Castle, Torgau, Saxony, Germany

Die Dafne (1627) is an opera. Its libretto was written by Martin Opitz (which survives) and its music was composed by Heinrich Schütz (which is lost). It has traditionally been regarded as the first German opera, though it has also been proposed more recently that it was in fact a spoken drama with inserted song and ballet numbers.

== History ==
=== Development ===
Opitz was already a friend of Schütz and in all wrote twelve German madrigal texts for him. In 1625 and 1626 Opitz visited the Dresden court, to work with Schütz on a Sing-Comoedie based on the model of Jacopo Peri's Dafne. Opitz rewrote the libretto after Rinuccini, translating it into Alexandrine verse, and his libretto was so highly regarded that it was later adapted back into Italian by later Italian librettists. Opitz and Schütz' were probably attracted by religious content of the work, rather than the purely pagan mythology of Dafne or Euridice. The electoral secretary to the Saxon Court, Johann Seusse also exerted influence on the project.

=== Premiere ===
The opera premiered in the banquet hall of Hartenfels Castle near Torgau, Saxony during the marriage of Princess Sophia Eleonore of Saxony and George II of Hesse-Darmstadt on April 13, 1627. However, the opera received little attention in midst of other activities during the ceremony, including bear fights on April 7 and 10 and a wolf hunt on April 9.

=== Loss and Reconstruction ===
Schütz's score for the opera was lost sometime during the Thirty Years' War. However, German musicologist Reinhard Seehafer managed to reconstruct the opera in 2007.

== Synopsis ==
The opera is divided into a prologue and five acts.

=== Prologue ===
Ovid delivers in seven stanzas of six verses the power of love.

=== Act I ===
Shepherds are terrorized by a monster in the countryside. Apollo arrives and slays the monster to the rejoicing and celebration of the shepherds.

=== Act II ===
Cupid and his mother are engaged in bitter dialogue before being interrupted by the entrance of Apollo. Apollo mocks Cupid, and Cupid swears revenge. A choir of shepherds sings the glories of Cupid.

=== Act III ===
Cupid avenges himself by making Apollo fall in love with Daphne. Shepherds praise the benefits of hunting.

=== Act IV ===
Cupid celebrates his triumph with Venus. The shepherds sing of love.

=== Act V ===
Apollo chases Daphne until she calls upon the help of her father Peneus. Peneus turns Daphne into a laurel tree, eternally bestowing her leaves on poets. Shepherds and nymphs dance around the tree.

== Modern scholarly reevaluation ==
Although long unquestioned as "the first German opera" the performance started no notable tradition in Germany, and Wolfram Steude (1991) made the controversial proposal that Dafne was in fact a spoken drama with inserted song and ballet numbers. Consequently recent publications such as the latest edition of the New Grove Dictionary of Opera are more cautious in attribution of the "first German opera" claim.

== Other dramatic works by Schütz ==
Two other large scale sung dramas by Schütz are also lost:

- Orpheus und Eurydike (Dresden, 1638) — a ballet based on the myth about Orpheus and Eurydice, with libretto by August Buchner.
- Paris und Helena five-act Sing-Ballet to a libretto by David Schirmer. For the double wedding in Dresden of the brothers Maurice, Duke of Saxe-Zeitz and Christian I, Duke of Saxe-Merseburg.

== See also ==
- Origins of opera
- Seelewig (1644) of Sigmund Staden, first surviving German opera
- Pomone (opera) (1671) of Robert Cambert, first French opera (lost)
- Venus and Adonis (opera) (1683) John Blow, first true English-language opera.
