= Esther Charlotte Brandes =

German actress and opera singer (1746–1786)

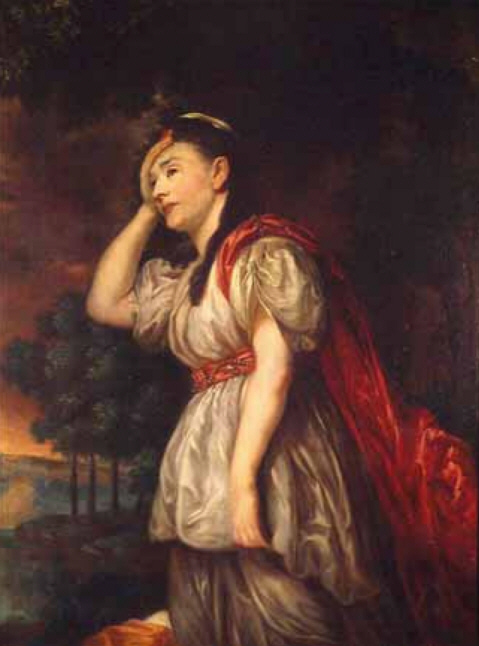
Brandes as Ariadne, by Anton Graff

Esther Charlotte Brandes, née Koch (1746 – 13 May 1786), was a German actress and opera singer.

She was born in Groß Rosinsko, Kingdom of Prussia (today Różyńsk Wielki, Poland) and was the daughter of Prussian official Gottfried Salomo Koch.

She was engaged in the Schuch theater company from 1764 until 1768, in the Seyler Theatre Company from 1768 until 1775, and at the Riga City Theater after its foundation. She performed as Medea, Orsina, Minna von Barnhelm. She became most popular for her role of Ariadne in the duodrama Ariadne auf Naxos with music composed by Georg Benda. She is also known to have dressed in a historical costume for this play, which was an innovation for her time in an age when actors generally did not yet dress in historically correct costumes for their roles. She was depicted in this role in a painting by Anton Graff.

Esther Charlotte married Johann Christian Brandes (1735–1799) on 24 May 1764 in Breslau (today Wrocław). They had three children, notably the singer, actress, composer and pianist Minna Brandes. The Brandes family also prepared concerts for Princess Elisabeth Christine of Brunswick-Wolfenbüttel-Bevern.

She died on 13 May 1786 in Hamburg, Germany.
