= Doktor und Apotheker =

1786 opera by Carl Ditters von Dittersdorf

- Singspiel by Carl Ditters von Dittersdorf
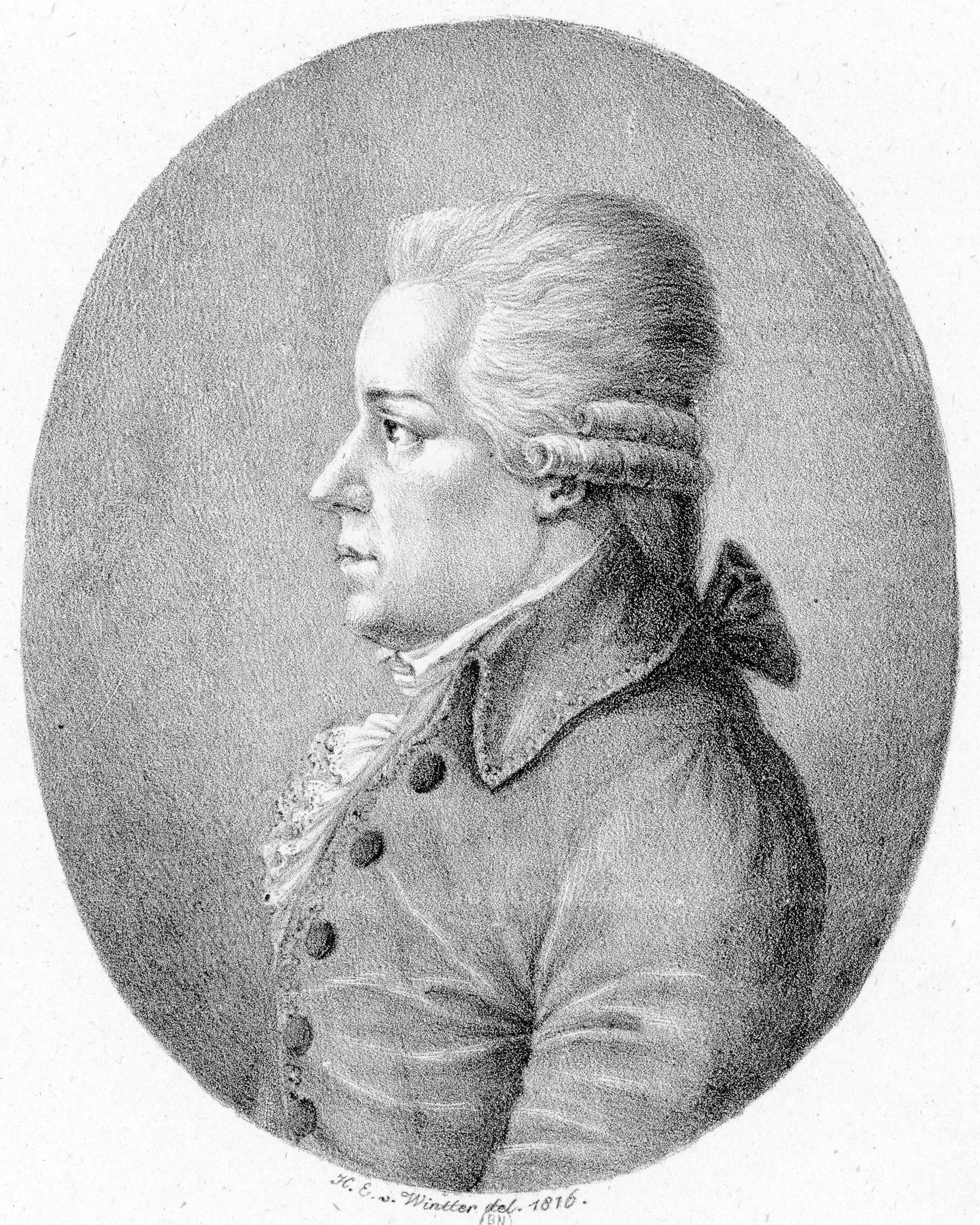
- The composer
- Translation: Doctor and Apothecary
- Librettist: Gottlieb Stephanie
- Language: German
- Based on: L'apothicaire de Murcie
- Premiere: 17 July 1786; Burgtheater, Vienna

Doktor und Apotheker (Doctor and Apothecary) is a German-language two-act singspiel by Carl Ditters von Dittersdorf, with a libretto by Johann Gottlieb Stephanie the Younger, based on the anonymous French comedy L'apothicaire de Murcie (The Apothecary of Murcie). Although rarely heard now, Doktor und Apotheker was one of the most popular operas of its day, for a time eclipsing performances of Mozart's operas in Vienna. A contemporary press called the opera "a true masterpiece of art", praising the originality of Dittersdorf's music. With its incorporation of the Singspiel with sophisticated elements of Italian opera, it was also a watershed moment in the development of German comic opera, helping point the way to the development of German national opera and in particular of Viennese operetta. It is considered the composer's masterpiece and premiered on 11 July 1786 at the k. u. k. National-Theater in Vienna.

== Background ==
As part of his plan in the 1770s to use theatre to uplift the masses, Emperor Joseph II embarked on a project to foster the development of German-language opera beyond its singspiel roots. This new kind of opera would be a fusion of Germany's robust literary developments with the musical richness of Italian opera which dominated Viennese culture at the time. Joseph II's designation of the Burgtheater in Vienna as a national theatre in 1776 and subsequent founding of Das deutsche Nationalsingspiel was a significant step toward fulfilling his mission.

Meanwhile, Carl Ditters von Dittersdorf composed thirteen operas between 1771 and 1786, mostly in the Italian buffa style in vogue at the time. Dittersdorf's courtly appointments as composer, violinist, and conductor ultimately brought him in closer contact with the Emperor, for whose coronation he had already composed a mass. Dittersdorf received a commission for Doktor und Apotheker from the Nationalsingspiel in 1786, making this his first German-language comic opera and marking a breakthrough for the composer and for German comic opera as a whole.

== Roles ==
- Stößel, an apothecary (bass)
- Claudia, his wife (soprano)
- Leonore, their daughter (soprano)
- Rosalie, Stößel's niece (soprano)
- Doctor Krautmann (bass)
- Gotthold, his son (tenor)
- Sturmwald, a captain invalided out of the army (tenor)
- Sichel, surgeon (tenor)
- Police Commissioner (bass)
- Gallus, a patient's servant (tenor)
- Marx, apprentice apothecary (non-speaking and non-singing role)

== Synopsis ==
=== Act 1 ===
Stößel, the village pharmacist, plans to marry off his daughter Leonora to a drunken captain, Sturmwald. Leonore, however, is in love with Gotthold, the son of her father's professional rival, Doctor Krautmann. The evening before the wedding, Gotthold arrives at Stößel's house to visit his Leonore one last time before she is married; there, he encounters Sichel, who is there to see his beloved, Rosalie (Stößel's niece). To get them both into the house, Sichel plays upon Stößel's pride by convincing him to visit an ailing client, and there administer a medicine of his (Stößel's) creation that Sichel deems the greatest medicine in the world. After Leonore and Rosalie sing a romance lamenting their marital fates, Sichel and Gotthold climb through the window, and the pairs of lovers decide on the spot to marry the next day. Hearing the noise upstairs, Leonore's mother Claudia becomes suspicious and enters the room. Leonore provides outlandish excuses for the noise, Stößel returns home, and Gotthold and Sichel are forced into hiding. They escape once the commotion dies down, but not before locking a drunken Sturmwald in Stößel's laboratory, stealing his hat and wooden leg in the process.

=== Act 2 ===
Dr. Krautmann, extolling the importance of his own profession, is confronted by Gallus, who begs him to come see his master, a nobleman on the verge of death thanks to a dose of Stößel's medication. Back at the pharmacist's house, Sichel and Gotthold have disguised themselves, respectively, as Sturmwald and a notary. The disguises successfully persuade Stößel to sign a marriage contract for an immediate wedding, and Gotthold gets a reluctant Leonore to sign by discreetly revealing that it is he in disguise as the notary.

Once the real Sturmwald awakens in the laboratory from his drunken stupor, Stößel and Claudia realize they have been duped, and they suspect the doctor's son. As Stößel searches outside for Gotthold and Leonore, he encounters Doctor Krautmann, who accuses Stößel of poisoning his patient with his medicine, and Stößel accuses the doctor's son of taking his daughter (to which Krautmann is oblivious). The finale finds all of the characters in the garden where the pairs lovers are meeting. An enraged Stößel attempts to have Gotthold and Sichel arrested, but when Claudia arrives, she brokers a reconciliation between the doctor and the pharmacist – if Gotthold may go free, Krautmann agrees not to turn Stößel in for his patient's death. The lovers marry, and Sichel will be an apprentice in Stößel's laboratory.

== Music ==
Doktor und Apotheker was unique for combining elements of the singspiel with Italian opera buffa. The extensive dialogue is framed by arias in the simply harmonized and hummable manner of the singspiel, but incorporating complex stylistic elements of Italian opera buffa enriches the characters and elevates the music to a higher level of sophistication. Leonore's act 1 aria, "Verliebte brauchen keine Zeugen", for instance, begins in a simple, homophonic style typically found in the singspiel, but incorporates elaborate vocal melisma on the word "laufen" (laugh), a text-painting technique typical of Handel's Italian operas. "Vermaledeit sei die Methode", the act 2 duet with Gallus and Krautmann, is a fast-paced patter song, another common feature of the buffa style.

One of Doktor und Apotheker's most innovative features is the use of the sectional finale at the end of each act. Finales in previous 18th century light opera were much more trivial, but dramatists such as Carlo Goldoni (and others who contributed libretti to operas), began to conceive of it as a means of bringing the opera's characters and the story's strands together. Dittersdorf's music at the end of both acts uses contrasting tempi, frequent key changes, and textural variety to convey the heightened activity onstage. The act 1 finales of Mozart's Le nozze di Figaro and Don Giovanni (exact contemporaries of Doktor und Apotheker), are famous examples of this approach, but Dittersdorf deserves credit for introducing the practice into German-language comic opera.

In addition to strings and timpani, the orchestra consists of pairs of flutes, oboes, bassoons, horns, and trumpets.

== Recordings ==
Only a handful of recordings of Doktor und Apotheker exist, the most recent of which was made for RBM Records/Bayer Records in 1981, conducted by James Lockhart leading the Staatsorchester Rheinische Philharmonie. It contains the complete dialogue, as well as Dittersdorf's score.
