= Ariadne auf Naxos (Benda) =

- Duodrama by Georg Benda
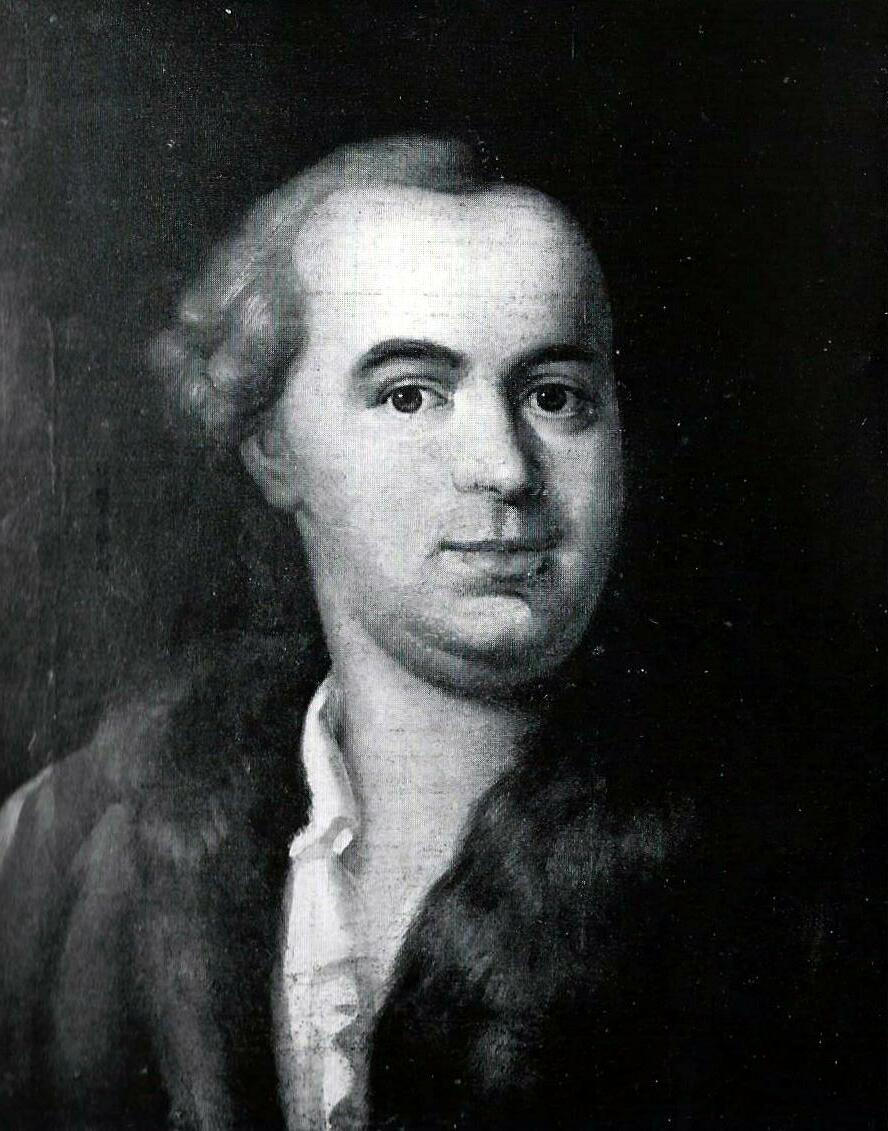
- Georg Benda in 1751
- Librettist: Johann Christian Brandes
- Language: German
- Premiere: 27 January 1775; Schloss Friedenstein, Gotha

Ariadne auf Naxos (Ariadne on Naxos) is a duodrama in one act by Czech composer Georg Benda with a German libretto by Johann Christian Brandes. It was commissioned by Abel Seyler, whose theatrical company arrived in Gotha in 1774. The opera's first performance was at the Schloss Friedenstein, Gotha, on 27 January 1775.

== Historical background and musical analysis ==
Ariadne auf Naxos belonged to the genre known as German melodrama, an attempt is to merge spoken dialogue with music, making it the only form of opera with no singing. Brandes wrote the text of Ariadne auf Naxos for his wife Charlotte, a famous singer and actress of the day. She played the role of Ariadne in the premiere. The basis for Brandes' libretto was a cantata by Heinrich Wilhelm von Gerstenberg. However, Tim Ashley in his review of a 2005 performance of the work, suggests that Brandes may have been influenced by Virgil's Aeneid, "Theseus is a man of destiny and conscience; Ariadne has no Bacchus to redeem her and instead commits suicide after seeing Theseus sail away".

Mozart attended a production of Ariadne auf Naxos and became a great admirer of Benda's compositions. In 1778 he wrote to his father expressing the desire to compose a duodrama entitled Semiramide on the model of Benda's Ariadne auf Naxos and Medea. He believed at the time that melodrama was the way to solve the problems of operatic recitative. However, Mozart never got around to creating a duodrama. He did create a miniature melodrama within his unfinished operetta, Zaide, written in 1780. Other composers who admired and were influenced by Benda's melodramas include Carl Maria von Weber and Ludwig van Beethoven.

== Performance history ==
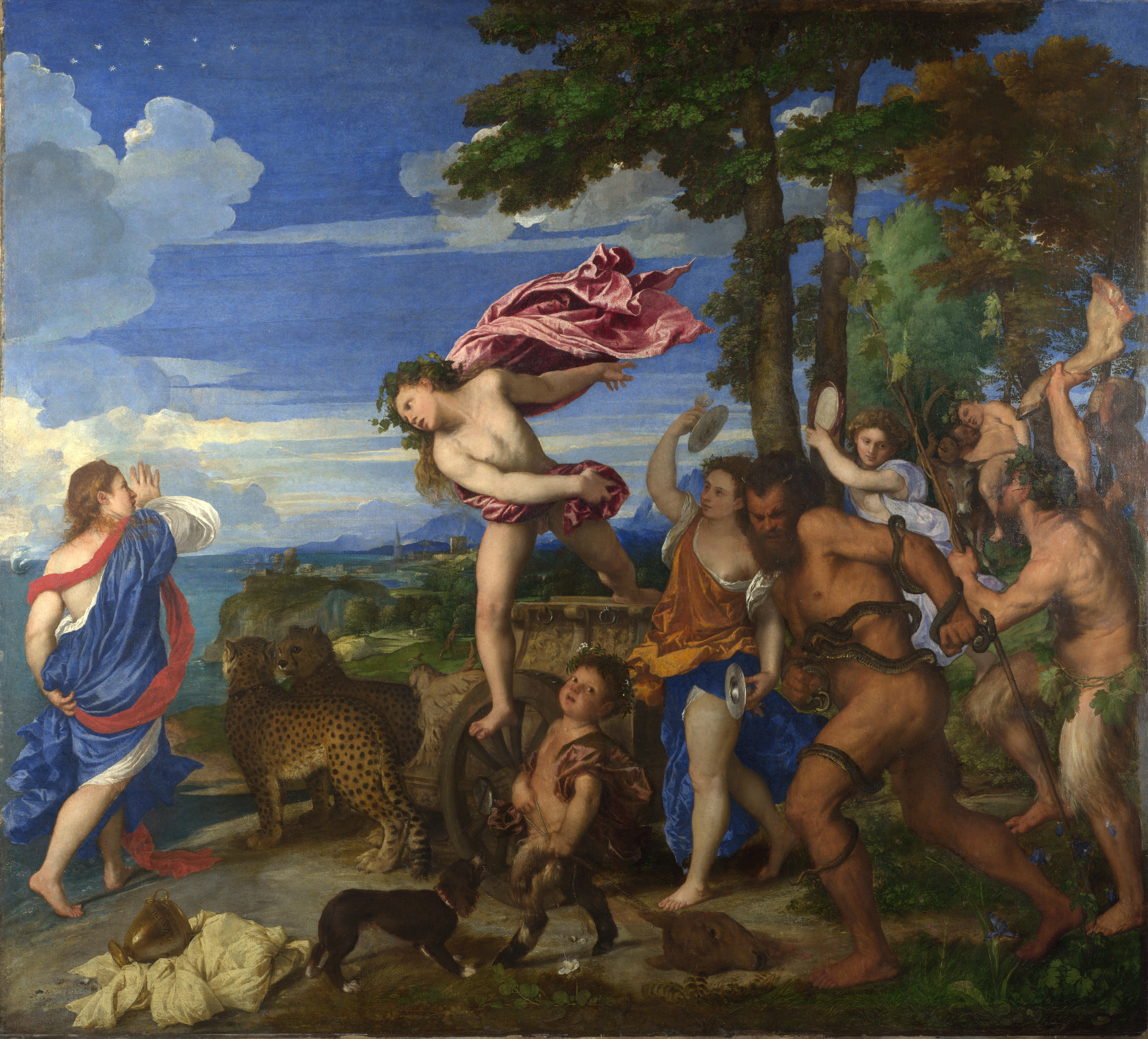
Bacchus and Ariadne by Titian: Dionysus discovers Ariadne on the shore of Naxos. The painting also depicts the constellation named after Ariadne.

Although not performed often, Benda's Ariadne has remained in the performance repertoire since it first premiered and a number of recordings of the work have been made. Most recently, the work was performed in August 2005 at the Edinburgh International Festival in a double bill with Mozart's Zaide. The cast included Dagmar Manzel as Ariadne and Rainer Trost as Theseus. Charles Mackerras conducted the English National Opera orchestra.

== Roles ==
Role	Voice type	Premiere Cast, 27 January 1775 (Conductor: – )
Ariadne	speaking role	Esther Charlotte Brandes
Theseus	speaking role	

== Synopsis ==
Ariadne is sleeping on the shore of the island of Naxos, as Theseus, her lover, looks down on her resting form. Theseus feels there is a destiny placed upon him and feels that he can not stay tied to Ariadne and fulfill that destiny. He slips away from Ariadne on his ship, leaving her stranded alone on Naxos. Ariadne awakes to find herself deserted by the faithless Theseus. Ariadne despairs and commits suicide.

== Discography ==
- Benda Melodramas: Ariadne auf Naxos/Pygmalion with conductor Christian Benda and the Prague Chamber Orchestra. Cast: Brigitte Quadlbauer (Ariadne) and Peter Uray (Theseus). Released in 1996 on the Naxos label.
- Melodrama: Carl Eberwein's Proserpina and Georg Benda's Ariadne auf Naxos with conductor Peter Gulke and the Symphony Orchestra Wuppertal. Released in 1997 on the Gold label.
