= Carl Ditters von Dittersdorf =

Austrian composer (1739–1799)

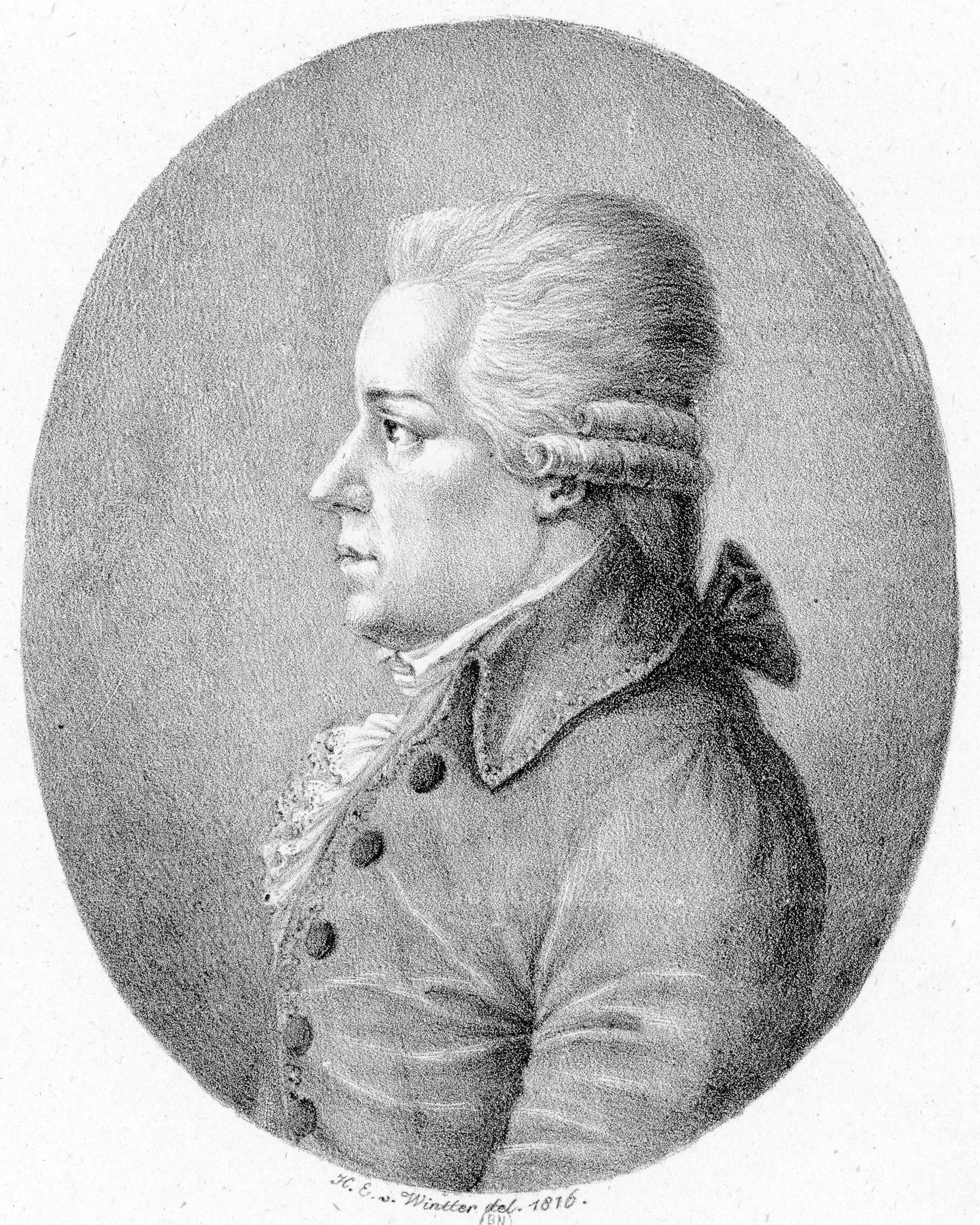
- Born: 2 November 1739; Vienna
- Died: 24 October 1799 (aged 59); Nový Dvůr, Bohemia
- Occupations: Composer; Violinist

Carl Ditters von Dittersdorf (2 November 1739 – 24 October 1799) was an Austrian composer and violinist. He was a friend of both Haydn and Mozart. His best-known works include the German singspiel Doktor und Apotheker and a number of programmatic symphonies based on Ovid's Metamorphoses.

== Life ==
=== 1739–1764 ===
Dittersdorf was born in the Laimgrube (now Mariahilf) district of Vienna, Austria, as Johann Carl Ditters. His father was a military tailor in the Austrian Imperial Army of Charles VI, for a number of German-speaking regiments. After retiring honorably from his military obligation, he was provided with royal letters of reference and a sinecure with the Imperial Theatre. In 1745, the six-year-old August Carl was introduced to the violin and his father's moderate financial position allowed him not only a good general education at a Jesuit school, but private tutelage in music, violin, French and religion. After leaving his first teacher, Carl studied violin with J. Ziegler, who by 1750, through his influence, secured his pupil's appointment as a violinist in the orchestra of the Benedictine church on the Freyung.

Ovid Symphony, N. 2: Introduction and first movement: Adagio non molto-Allegro. Arrival of Phaeton at the Golden Palace of his father the god Sun.
Porticodoro / SmartCGArt Media Productions – Classical Orchestra.

Prince Joseph of Saxe-Hildburghausen soon noticed young Ditters, and on 1 March 1751 hired him for his court orchestra. Under princely auspices he studied violin with Francesco Trani who, impressed with the ability of his pupil in composition, commended him to Giuseppe Bonno who instructed him in Fuxian counterpoint and free composition. After a few years Prince Joseph disbanded the orchestra, since he had to leave Vienna to assume the regency in Hildburghausen, and the Austrian Empress Maria Theresa hired Dittersdorf for her own orchestra through Count Durazzo, Theatre Director at the Imperial Court. In

1761, he was engaged as violinist in the Imperial Theatre orchestra, and in 1762 as its conductor. It was during this period that he became acquainted with Christoph Willibald Gluck, who had just achieved greatness as an opera composer with the Vienna première of his Orfeo ed Euridice. In 1763, he traveled to Bologna with Gluck to see the opera Il trionfo di Clelia, an Italian tour that was to leave the greatest impression on his future work as a composer from both the Austrian Gluck and the contemporary Italian musical scene. In 1764, he traveled to Paris, a trip with only scarce and uncertain documentation. Back in Vienna in 1764, his contract with Count Durazzo expired that winter, but he met the great Joseph Haydn and became one of his closest friends.

=== 1764–1774 ===
In 1764, Dittersdorf assumed the post of Kapellmeister at the court of Ádám Patachich, Hungarian nobleman and Bishop of Nagyvárad (Oradea, Romania). The following year he was introduced to Philipp Gotthard von Schaffgotsch, the Prince-Bishop of Breslau, who was in the process of creating a cultural centre around his court based at Château Jánský vrch (Johannesberg) in Javorník (today part of the Czech Republic). He accepted the post of Hofkomponist (court composer) in 1771, and it was during his tenure at Johannesberg that most of his creative output was produced.

Over the next twenty years he wrote symphonies, string quartets and other chamber music, and opere buffe. In 1773 the prince-bishop appointed him Amtshauptmann of nearby Jeseník (Freiwaldau), one of several measures to help entice the cosmopolitan composer to remain at isolated Johannesberg. Since this new post required a noble title, Ditters was sent to Vienna and given the noble title of von Dittersdorf. His full surname thus became "Ditters von Dittersdorf", but he is usually referred to simply as "Dittersdorf".

Ovid Symphony, N. 1: Final Part of the third movement: Menuetto con garbo. Description of The Age of Bronze.
Porticodoro / SmartCGArt Media Productions – Classical Orchestra.

=== Final years ===
Johann Baptist Wanhal was perhaps Dittersdorf's most eminent pupil. About 1785, Haydn, Dittersdorf, Mozart and Wanhal played string quartets together, Dittersdorf taking first violin, Haydn second violin, Mozart viola and Wanhal cello. Eminent Irish tenor Michael Kelly noted of their performance of Stephen Storace's String Quartet that, although they played well, their performance as a whole was not outstanding; but the image of four of the greatest composers of their time joining in common music-making remains an unforgettable vignette of the Classical era (comprising the second half of the eighteenth century).

In 1794, after twenty-four years at Johannesberg, Dittersdorf, after a serious clash with von Schaffgotsch, was expelled from his palace. Sometime the following year, he was invited by Baron Ignaz von Stillfried to live in his spare château known as Červená Lhota, in southern Bohemia. His final decade was occupied with overseeing operatic productions in addition to compiling and editing his own music for publication.

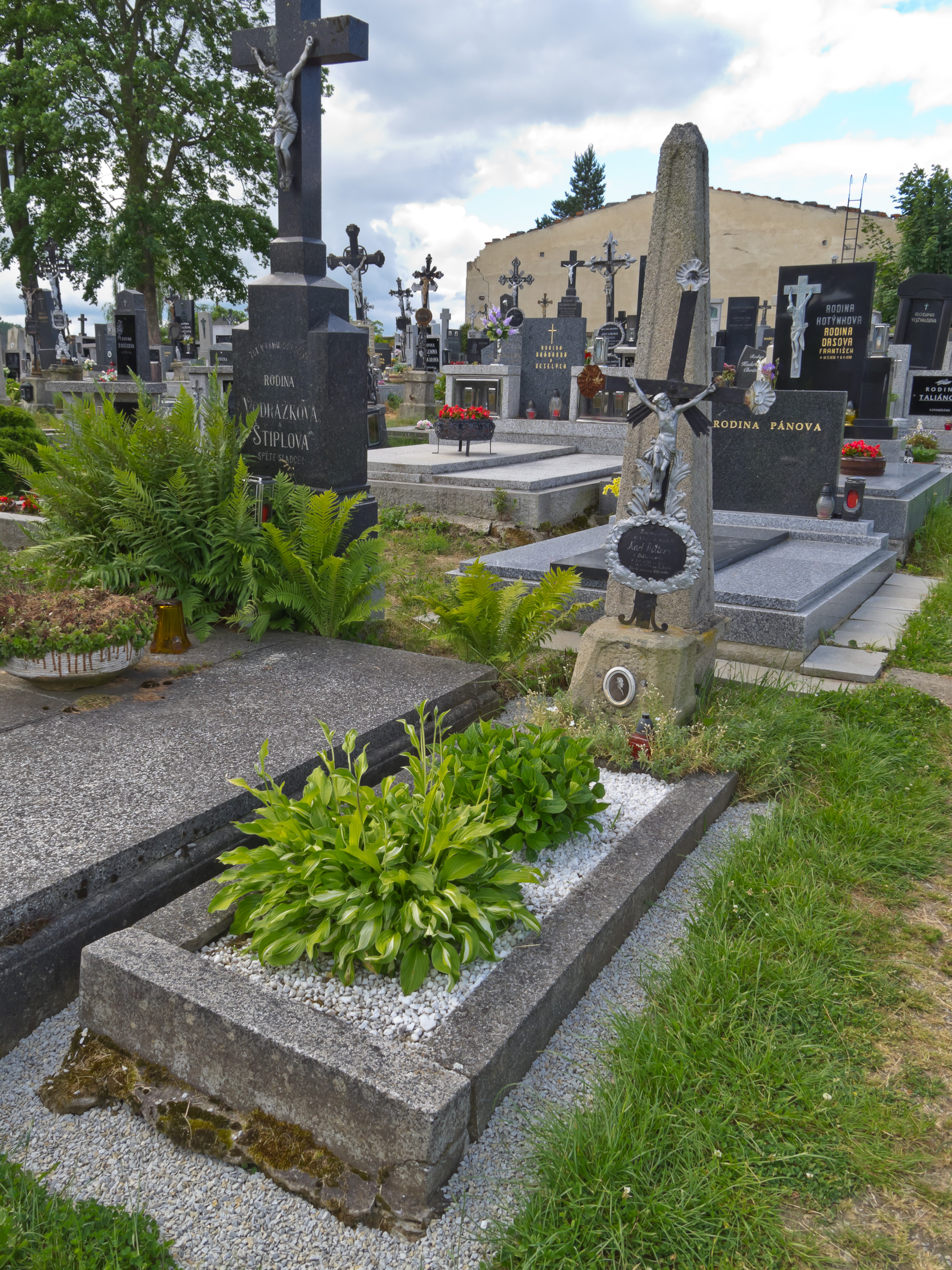
Tomb in Deštná

He died at Nový Dvůr (Neuhof, or "New Court") where Château Červená Lhota stood, and was buried in the town of Deštná. He finished his autobiography just three days before his death.

== Style and fame ==
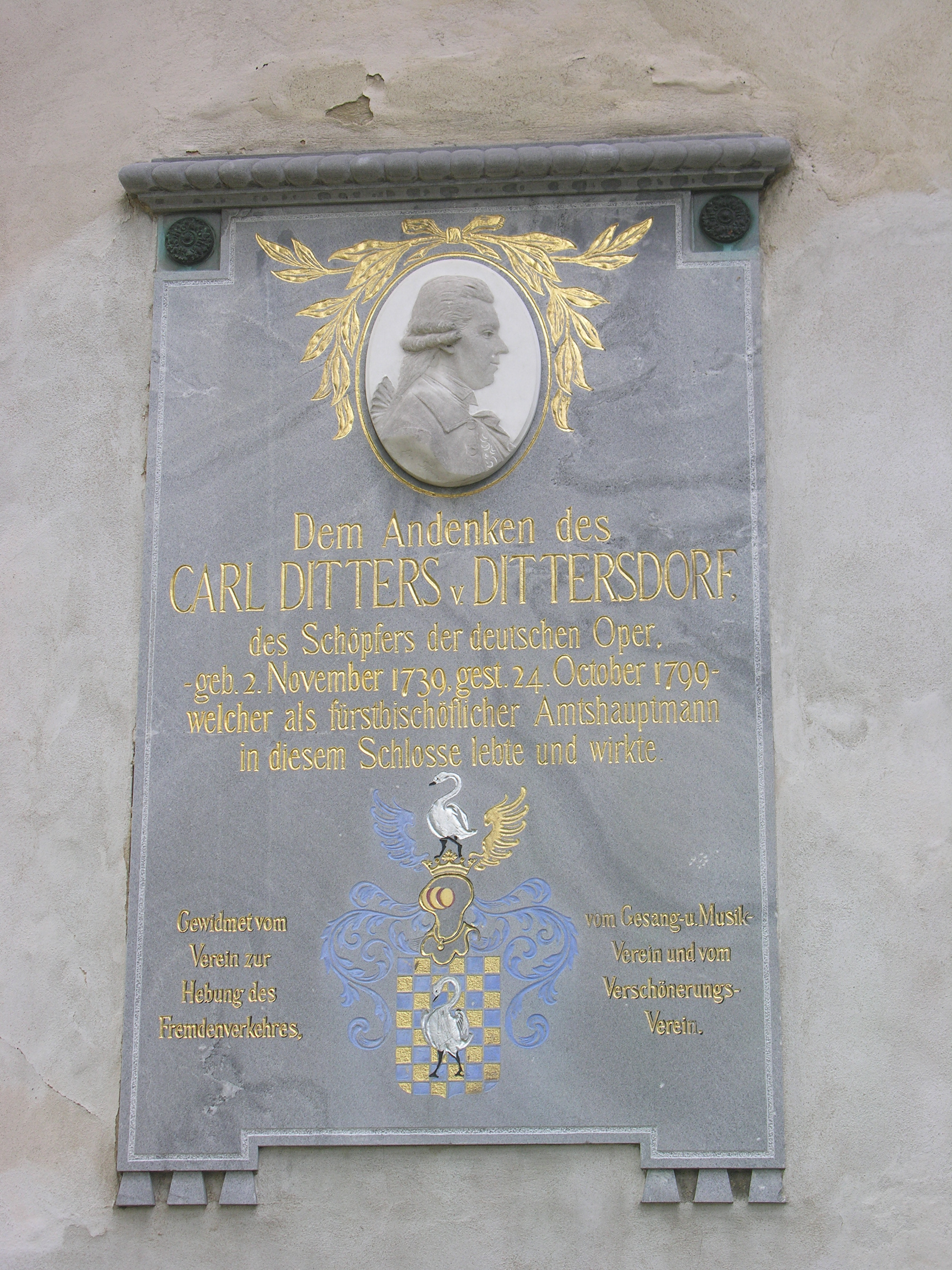
The plaque for Karl Ditters von Dittersdorf in Jeseník

Ditters' early work laid the groundwork for his later compositions. His symphonic and chamber compositions greatly emphasize sensuous Italo-Austrian melody instead of motivic development, which is often entirely lacking in his works. After some early Italian opere buffe, he turned to writing German Singspiele instead, with Der Apotheker und der Doktor (1786, generally known today as Doktor und Apotheker) in particular being a tremendous success in his lifetime, playing in houses all over Europe and recorded almost two centuries later.

Among his 120-or-so symphonies are 12 programmatic ones based on Ovid's Metamorphoses, although only six have survived (and have also been recorded). He also wrote oratorios, cantatas and concertos (among which are two for double bass and one for viola), string quartets and other chamber music, piano pieces and other miscellaneous works. His memoirs, Lebenbeschreibung ("Description of [My] Life"), were published in Leipzig in 1801. Some of his compositions, including the double bass concerto, were published in Leipzig by the Friedrich Hofmeister Musikverlag.

== Works ==
Sonata in A major
I. Allegro

II. Andante

III. Allegro
Performed by Kaila Rochelle on the Pianoteq "Walter" fortepiano with a Roland RD-700 keyboard midi controller.

=== Concertos ===
Ouverture from Hocus Pocus.

- Grosses Concert per 11 strum. (1766)
- 18 concertos for Violin
- 3 concertos for 2 Violins
- 5 concertos for Viola
- 1 concerto for Cello
- 2 concertos for Contrabass
- 1 concerto for Viola and Contrabass
- 1 concerto for Piano
- 5 concertos for Oboe
- 1 concerto for Oboe d'Amore
- 5 concertos for Harpsichord
- 2 concertos for Quartet
- 2 concertinos

==== Concertos: manuscripts ====
- Concerto for Oboe (in C major) (MS: Dittersdorf 32; now publ. Artaria)
- Concerto for Flute (in e minor) (MS: Dittersdorf 36; now publ. Artaria)
- Concerto for 2 Violins (in D major) (MS: mu6402.2532; now publ. Artaria)
- Concerto for 2 Violins (in C major) (MS: mu6402.2530; now publ. Artaria)

==== Concertos: selection of best known concertos ====
- Concerto for Oboe in G major (Breitkopf & Härtel)
- Concerto for Oboe in C major (The Danish Royal Library)
- Concerto for Oboe in D major L.25b
- Concerto for Oboe in C major L.39
- Concerto for Oboe in C major L.40a
- Concerto for Oboe in C major L.24
- Concerto for Oboe in G major L.42
- Concerto for Oboe d'Amore in A major L.43b
- Concerto for Flute in e minor (The Danish Royal Library)
- Concerto for Cello in D major (The Danish Royal Library)
- Concerto for Contrabass (Double Bass Concerto) No.1 in E major (The Danish Royal Library)
- Concerto for Contrabass (Double Bass Concerto) No.2 in D major (The Danish Royal Library)
- Concerto for Contrabass (Double Bass Concerto) in E♭ major (The Danish Royal Library)
- Concerto for Contrabass, Viola and Orchestra (The Danish Royal Library)
- Concerto for Viola and Orchestra in F major (The Danish Royal Library)
- Concerto for Violin and Orchestra in C major (The Danish Royal Library)
- Concerto for Violin and Orchestra in G major (The Danish Royal Library)
- Concerto for Harp, originally for cembalo, in A major (The Danish Royal Library)
- Concerto for Cembalo/Harpsichord in B major (The Danish Royal Library)
- Concerto for 2 Violins in D major L.2
- Concerto for 2 Violins in C major L.4
- Concertino for 2 Violins, 2 Violas, 2 Oboes, 2 Horns, Basson and Bass

=== Symphonies ===
Dittersdorf left about 120 symphonies with solid attribution. There are about another 90 symphonies which may be Dittersdorf's work—according to the catalogue published by Helen Geyer, Torino 1985. Most of the symphonies are preserved only in manuscripts. Many manuscripts are inscribed di Carlo de Dittersdorf or similar, however they are copies of now lost original scores.

- Sinfonia nel gusto di cinque nazioni (Paris, 1767)
- 6 Symphonies Op. 1 (Amsterdam, 1768?)
- 6 Symphonies Op. 4 (Paris, 1769?)
- The Periodical Ouverture (London, 1769)
- 3 Symphonies Op. 5 (Paris, 1769?)
- Symphonies Périodiques (Amsterdam, 1770–72)
- 3 Symphonies Op. 6 (Paris, 1773?)
- 4 Symphonies Op. 7 (Paris, 1773?)
- 3 Symphonies Op. 8 (Paris, 1773?)
- 6 Symphonies Op. 13 (Paris, 1781)

==== Symphonies: manuscripts ====
- Grande symphonie: Le carnaval ou La redoute (MS)

I Minuetto II Anglaise III Concerto IV Ballo Strassburgnese V Polonaise VI Ballo Tedesco VII Kehraus

- Symphony (in A minor) Il deliro delli compositori, ossia Il gusto d'oggidi' (MS: Ser.H Fasc.34 Nr.317; now publ. Artaria)
- Symphony (in A major) Nazionale nel gusto (MS: Ser.H. Fasc.39 Nr.76; now publ. Artaria)
- Symphony (in D major) Il combattimento delle passioni umane (MS: Ser.H Fasc.34 Nr.315; now publ. Artaria)
- Symphony (in F major) (Grave F7) (MS: Ser.H Fasc.34 Nr.312; now publ. Artaria)
- Symphony (in D minor) (Grave d1) (MS: R.M.21.a.13.(3.); now publ. Artaria)
- Symphony (in G minor) (Grave g1) (MS: S.m.15957; Ser.H Fasc.33 Nr.293; now publ. Artaria)
- Symphony (in E major) (Grave E1) (MS: IV-A-39 / A- 3498; now publ. Artaria)
- Symphony (in E♭ major) (Grave Eb9) (MS: IV-A-59 / A-3515; now publ. Artaria)
- Symphony (in F major) (Grave F4) (MS: IV-A-38 / A-3497; now publ. Artaria)
- Symphony (in D major) (Grave D6) (MS: IV-A-66 / A-3522; now publ. Artaria)
- Symphony (in D major) (Grave D2) (MS: IV-A-51 / A-3509; now publ. Artaria)
- Symphony (in A major) (Grave A6) (MS: Ser.H Fasc.33 Nr.298; now publ. Artaria)
- Symphony (in B♭ major) (Grave Bb5) (MS: Ser.H Fasc.34 Nr.313; now publ. Artaria)

==== Symphonies: selection of best-known symphonies ====
- Sinfonia Concertante in D major (Breitkopf & Härtel)
- Sinfonia Concertante in D major for Viola, String Bass and Piano (International Music Company)
- Symphony in C major (Breitkopf & Härtel)
- Symphony in D major (Breitkopf & Härtel)
- Symphony in F major
- Symphony in D minor
- Symphony in G minor
- Symphony No. 1 in C after Ovid's "Metamorphoses" ("The Four Ages of the World")
- Symphony No. 2 in D after Ovid's "Metamorphoses" ("The Fall of Phaeton")
- Symphony No. 3 in G after Ovid's "Metamorphoses" ("The Metamorphosis of Acteon Into a Stag")
- Symphony No. 4 in F after Ovid's "Metamorphoses" ("The Rescue of Andromeda by Perseus")
- Symphony No. 5 in D after Ovid's "Metamorphoses" ("The Petrification of Phineus and his Friend")
- Symphony No. 6 in A after Ovid's "Metamorphoses" ("The Transformation of the Lycian Peasants into Frogs")
- Sinfonia Concerto for Viola, Contrabass and Orchestra in E♭ major

=== Chamber music ===
- 15 Divertimenti (Il combattimento dell'umane passioni is in this collection)
- 5 Cassazioni (2 published: Paris, 1768; the other 3 are MS)
- 4 Serenate for 2 Horns and Strings
- 35 Partite for Winds Instruments
- Petit Ballet en forme d'une contredanse
- 24 dances for the Redoutensaal (1794)
- 6 String Quintets for 2 vl., vla., vcl., ctbs. (1782)
- Sonata da camera a 5 stromenti
- 6 String Quartets (1789)
- Quartet in E♭ major
- 6 Sonatas for 2 vl. and vla. Op. 2 (Amsterdam, s. d.)
- 6 Trios for 2 vl. and b. op. 6 (Paris, 1771)
- Another 12 Trios (id.)
- 3 Trios for vl., vla. and vcl.
- Sonata for vl.
- 2 Duets for 2 vl.
- Duet for vla. and vcl. or ctbs. in E♭ major
- 14 duets for vl. and bass
- 136 pieces for Piano
- Divertimento for two Violins and Violoncello in E♭ major
- Notturno (in D) for 4 flutes

=== Operas ===
- Amore in Musica (1766, Grosswardein)
- Arcifanfano, rè de' Matti (1774 Johannisberg; 1776 Eszterházy)
- 25 000 Gulden oder im Dunkeln ist gut munkeln (1785, Vienna)
- Doktor und Apotheker (1786, Vienna) (Digital edition by the University and State Library Düsseldorf)
- Betrug durch Aberglauben (1786, Vienna)
- Die Liebe im Narrenhaus (1787, Vienna)
- Das rote Käppchen (1788, Vienna)
- Hieronymus Knicker (1789, Vienna)
- Das Gespenst mit der Trommel (1794, Oels)
- Don Quixote der Zweyte (1795, Oels)
- Die lustigen Weiber von Windsor (1796, Oels)
- Der Mädchenmarkt (1797)
- Die Opera Buffa (1798)

=== Oratorios ===
- Isacco figura del Redentore – in Latin (Grosswardein, 1766)
- Davide penitente – in Italian (Johannisberg, 1770)
- La Liberatrice del Popolo Giudaico nella Persia, o sia l'Esther- in Italian (Vienna, 1773)
- Giobbe – in Italian (Vienna, 1786)

=== Cantatas ===
- Auf das... Geburtsfest seiner Majestät des Königs (1781)
- Auf Lichtmess
- 11 other cantatas

=== Sacred music ===
- Missa in C major
- Missa a 4 v.
- Missa gratiosa in C major
- Missa in D major
- 12 other masses
- 2 Requiem Masses in C minor (1780/1784)
- 11 offertories
- Antiphony with choir, orchestra and organ
- 8 litanies
- 12 ariae ex canticis Salomonis (Augsburg, 1795)
- 170 other sacred music works: arias, graduals, motets et cetera.
- the aria Das Mädchen von Köln (from Ossian; Leipzig, 1795)
- 3 other arias for Soprano and orchestra

=== Other works ===
- Pastoral-Motette

== Discography ==
- Sinfonias on Ovid's Metamorphoses, Nos 1–3, Failoni Orchestra, Hanspeter Gmür, 1995, Naxos Nx 8553368
- Sinfonias on Ovid's Metamorphoses, Nos 4–6, Failoni Orchestra, Hanspeter Gmür, 1995, Naxos Nx 8553369 (The numerals for Sinfonias 5 & 6 are incorrectly transposed on this disc)
- Sinfonias. Grave d1, Grave F7, Grave g1, Failoni Orchestra, Uwe Grodd, 1996, Naxos Nx 8553974
- Sinfonias. Grave a2, Grave D16, Grave A10, Failoni Orchestra, Uwe Grodd, 1996, Naxos Nx 8553975
- Symphonies. C and D; Concertos. Flute and Double-Bass, Oradea Philharmonic, Miron Rațiu, Olympia OCD 405
- Symphonies. C, D, and a; Serenade. Oradea Philharmonic, Miron Rațiu, Olympia OCD 425
- Symphonies. e, E-flat, E, A, D, Oradea Philharmonic Orchestra, Romeo Rímbu, Olympia, OCD 426
- String Quartets 1 & 3–5, Franz Schubert Quartet, 1989, cpo 999 038-2
- String Quartets 2 & 6, String Quintets in C & G, Franz Schubert Quartet, 1992, cpo 999 122–2
- Geistliche Musik (Requiem, Offertorium zu Ehren des Heiligen Johann von Nepomuk, Lauretanische Litanei), Regensburger Domspatzen, Consortium musicum München, Georg Ratzinger, 1996 + 1987, Freiburger Musikforum / ars musici AM 1158-2
- Sinfonien in D, Es, A, Lisbon Metropolitan Orchestra, Álvaro Cassuto, 2006, Naxos
- Double Bass Concertos, Swedish Chamber Orchestra, Paul Goodwin, Chi-chi Nwanoku, 2000, hyperion
- Sinfonies Exprimant (Les Metamorphoses D'Ovide) Nos 1–6, Prague Chamber Orchestra, Bohumil Gregor, 1988 Supraphon
- Symphonies after Ovid's Metamorphoses, Nos 1–6, Cantilena, Adrian Shepherd, 1986, Chandos 8564/5

== See also ==
- List of Austrians in music
