= Medea (Benda) =

One-act melodrama

- Melodrama by Georg Benda
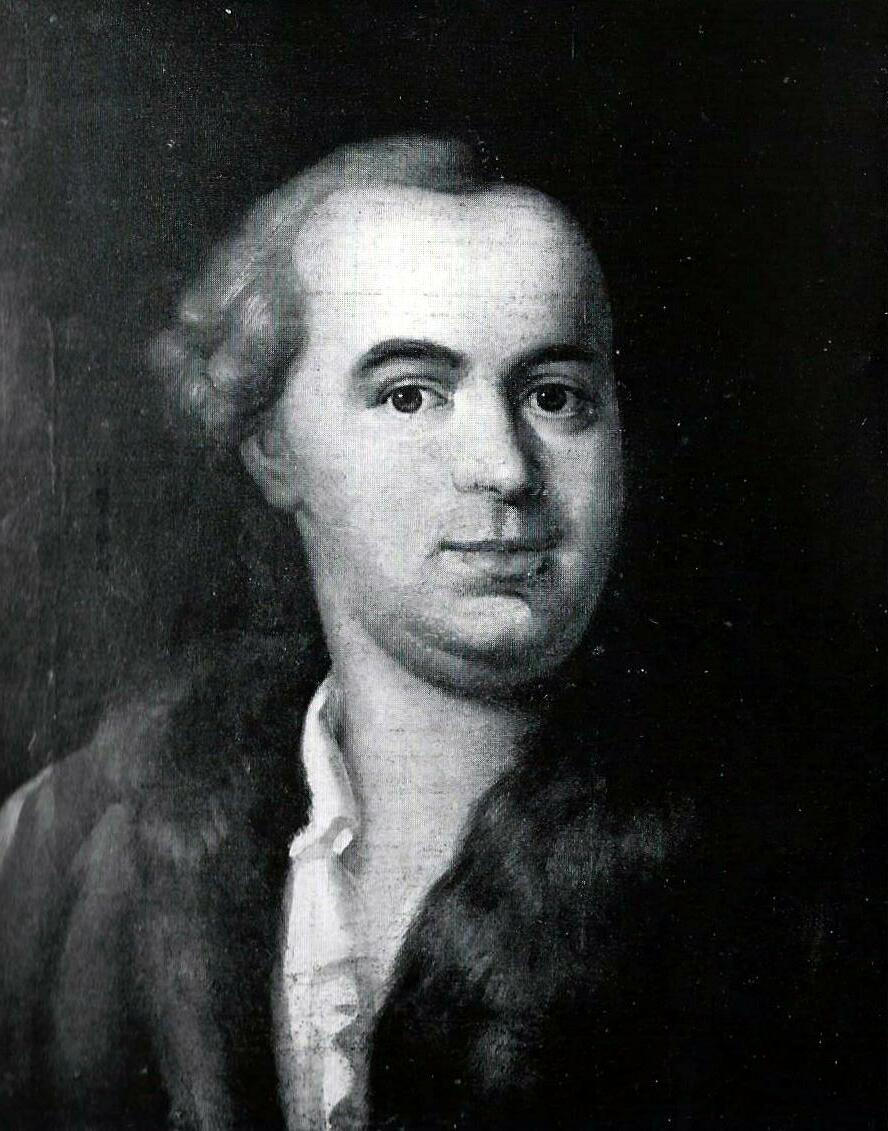
- Georg Benda in 1751
- Librettist: Friedrich Wilhelm Gotter
- Language: German
- Based on: Medea myth
- Premiere: 1 May 1775; Theater am Rannstädtertor, Leipzig

Medea is a melodrama in one act with five scenes by Bohemian composer Georg Benda with a German libretto by Friedrich Wilhelm Gotter. The work was first performed in Leipzig at the Theater am Rannstädtertor on 1 May 1775.

== Historical impact and musical analysis ==
Medea is considered to be one of Benda's best works and the composition had a significant impact on other composers of the late 18th century by popularizing the emerging genre of melodrama. Among those inspired by the work are Carl Philipp Emanuel Bach and Wolfgang Amadeus Mozart. Mozart in a letter to his father dated November 12, 1778 wrote, "The piece I saw was Benda’s Medea. He has composed another one, Ariadne auf Naxos, and both are really excellent. You know that of all the Lutheran Kapellmeisters Benda has always been my favorite, and I like those two works of his so much that I carry them about with me." Although Mozart never wrote a full melodrama, he did create a miniature melodrama within his unfinished operetta, Zaide (1780), that is highly reminiscent of the style of Benda's Medea. Mozart’s imagination was much fired by Benda’s new vehicle for dramatic expression, and in 1778 he wrote to his father with the greatest enthusiasm about a project for composing a duodrama on the model of Benda’s Ariadne auf Naxos and Medea, both of which he considered excellent.

== Roles ==
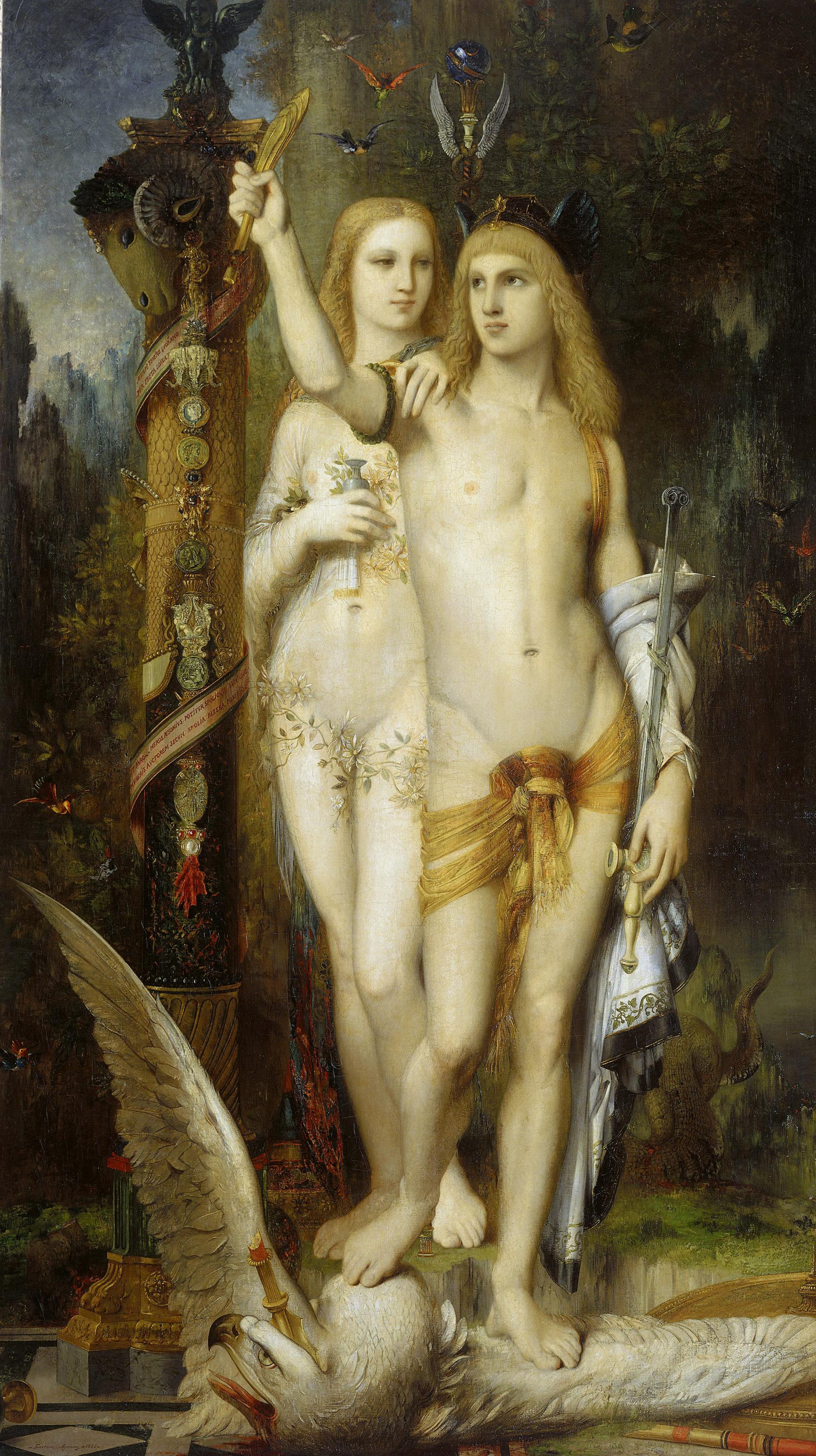
Jason et Médée by Gustave Moreau (1865).

Role	Voice type	Premiere Cast, 1775 (Conductor: – )
Medea	speaking role	Sophie Seyler
Jason	speaking role	
Their son	speaking role	
Kreusa (Creusa)	speaking role	
Housekeeper	speaking role	
Follower	speaking role	

== Discography ==
- Medea (Melodrama) with conductor Christian Benda and the Prague Chamber Orchestra. Cast includes: Brigitte Quadlbauer, Hertha Schell, and Peter Uray. Released on the Naxos label in 1996.
