= Nový Dvůr (Nymburk District) =

- Municipality
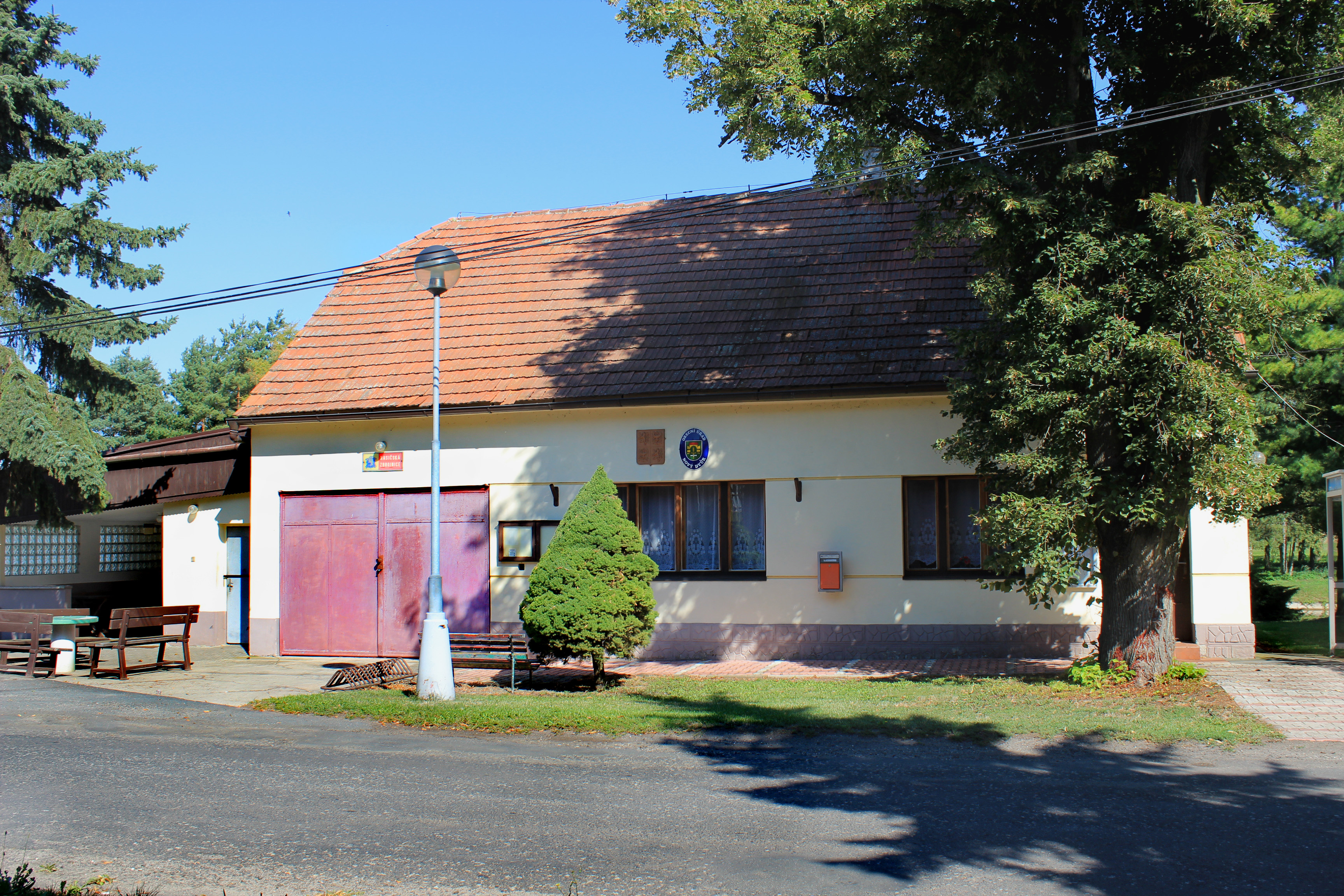
- Municipal office

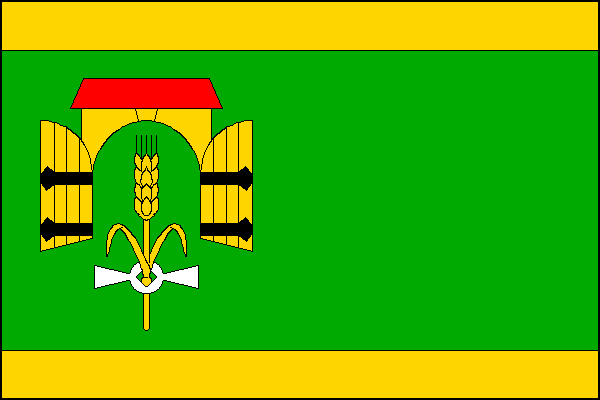
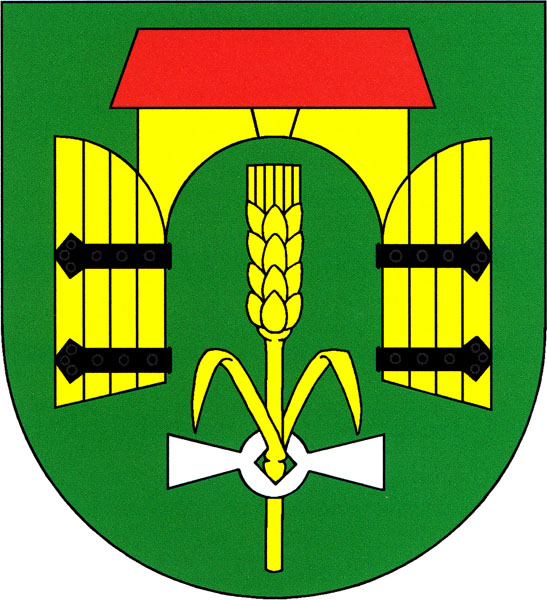
- Flag Coat of arms

- Location in the Czech Republic
- Coordinates: 50°13′56″N 15°6′39″E
- Country: Czech Republic
- Region: Central Bohemian
- District: Nymburk
- First mentioned: 1790

Area
  - Total: 2.47 km^{2} (0.95 sq mi)
- Elevation: 190 m (620 ft)

Population (2026-01-01)
  - Total: 78
  - Density: 32/km^{2} (82/sq mi)
- Time zone: UTC+1 (CET)
  - Summer (DST): UTC+2 (CEST)
- Postal code: 289 32
- Website: www.obec-novydvur.cz

Nový Dvůr is a municipality and village in Nymburk District in the Central Bohemian Region of the Czech Republic. It has about 80 inhabitants.

== Demographics ==
Historical population
Year	Pop.	±%
1869	187	—
1880	191	+2.1%
1890	185	−3.1%
1900	181	−2.2%
1910	188	+3.9%
1921	177	−5.9%
1930	161	−9.0%
1950	122	−24.2%
1961	100	−18.0%
1970	92	−8.0%
1980	83	−9.8%
1991	79	−4.8%
2001	70	−11.4%
2011	74	+5.7%
2021	77	+4.1%
Source: Censuses
