= Charlotte Wilhelmina Franziska Brandes =

German singer, pianist, actress and composer

Charlotte Wilhelmina Franziska Brandes (Minna) (21 May 1765 – 13 June 1788) was a German singer, pianist, actress and composer.

She was born in Berlin, the daughter of actress Esther Charlotte Brandes and playwright Johann Christian Brandes, and toured with her parents in Europe, performing on stage at an early age.

She studied music with Hönecke in Weimar and Christoph Transchel in Dresden for piano, Muriottini in Dresden and also Gertrud Elisabeth Mara and Giovanni Carlo Concialini for voice.

After completing her studies, Brandes worked as a singer and actress and composed songs and works for piano. She had a three octave range and performed successfully in courts and opera. After 1782 she lived in Hamburg, and died there.

== Works ==
Brandes composed works for piano and Italian and German songs which were edited by Friedrich Hoenicke, Music Director of Beyme Hamburg theater, and published after her death. Her works are published as A Musical Legacy. Selected compositions include:

- Allegro
- Harvest song, Allegretto
- To the Nightingale, Lento
- May Song, Allegretto
- Winter Song, Andante Moderato
- The dream, Adagio
- The old farmer and his son, Andante
- Spring Song, Andante
- Sigh, Largo
- Cavatina Larghetto, for two horns in F, flute, bassoon, two violins, viola, soprano, bass, harpsichord
- Duetto for soprano and orchestra
- Largo for orchestra
