= Seelewig =

Seelewig or Das geistliche Waldgedicht oder Freudenspiel genant Seelewig (The Sacred Forest Poem or Play of Rejoicing called Seelewig) is an opera in a prologue, three acts and an epilogue by the German composer Sigmund Theophil Staden.

The libretto by Georg Philipp Harsdörffer (1607–1658), first published 1644 in the fourth part of his Frauenzimmer Gesprächspiele, is based on the schoolplay Ein gar schön geistliches Waldgetichte genant Die glückseelige Seele of 1637, itself translated from L'anima felice favola boschareccia by the Italian Nicolò Negri (1606).

It is the earliest German opera whose music has survived. On the surface, the work seems to be a typical Christian allegory of the soul's journey through this world and the symbolic action takes place in a pastoral setting. Nonetheless, recent inquiries which account for the context of the libretto in Harsdörffer's Frauenzimmer Gesprächspiele have pointed out several problems of a seamless allegoresis. Those readings make it much more likely that Seelewig is bound to its Jesuit pretext in a complex, competitive and even polemic way.

The opera mixes musical numbers and spoken dialogue in a way which foreshadows the Singspiel.

== Performance history ==
It was performed before the court at Nuremberg in 1644. Duchess Elisabeth Sophie of Mecklenburg also arranged a performance at Wolfenbüttel on 21 April 1654 and it was staged again in Augsburg in 1698.

In the 1970s it was revived with productions in Germany, the Netherlands and Oberlin, Ohio.

== Roles ==
Roles, voice types
| Role | Voice type |
|---|---|
| Seelewig (Eternal Soul) | soprano |
| Trügewald a satyr | |
| Sinnigunda (Sensuousness) | |
| Gwissulda (Conscience) | soprano |
| Herzigild (Wisdom) | soprano |
| Reichimuth (Wealth) | |
| Ehrelob (Power) | |
| Künsteling | tenor |

== Synopsis ==
=== Prologue ===
Music confesses her disappointment that so much recent entertainment has been secular. Allied with Poetry, she intends to return to her true vocation: the praise of God.

=== Act 1 ===
The satyr Trügewald wants to seduce the beautiful nymph Seelewig. Fearing his own ugliness will lead to failure, he enlists the help of the vain young shepherd Künsteling, as well as Ehrelob, Reichimuth and Sinnigunda. Sinnigunda tries to lead Seelewig from the path of virtue but Gwissulda and Herzigild warn the latter to beware of her deceit. The thwarted Trügewald is furious.

=== Act 2 ===
Künsteling, Ehrelob, Reichimuth and Sinnigunda ply Seelewig with gifts (a telescope, a fishing rod, a bow and arrow and a crown of flowers). Once again Gwissulda and Herzigild save Seelewig from their seductions. Seelewig takes fright during a storm and sings a song asking advice from the forest echo, which warns her to flee the snares of this world.

=== Act 3 ===
The next morning Trügewald and his friends try a new way to trick Seelewig. Seelewig again asks advice from the echo but this time it is Trügewald who replies, disguising his voice. This echo tells Seelewig to give herself over to the pleasures of this world. As Seelewig plays a game of blind man's buff with the shepherds, Trügewald leaps out and catches her. But Gwissulda and Herzigild pull the blindfold off Seelewig's eyes to reveal the ugly truth. Trügewald and his companions are chased from the forest. Seelewig is converted and a chorus of angels give thanks for her salvation.

== Recordings ==
- Seelewig Soloists, I Ciarlatani, conducted by Klaus Winkler (CPO, 2004)
