= Sigmund Theophil Staden =

German composer

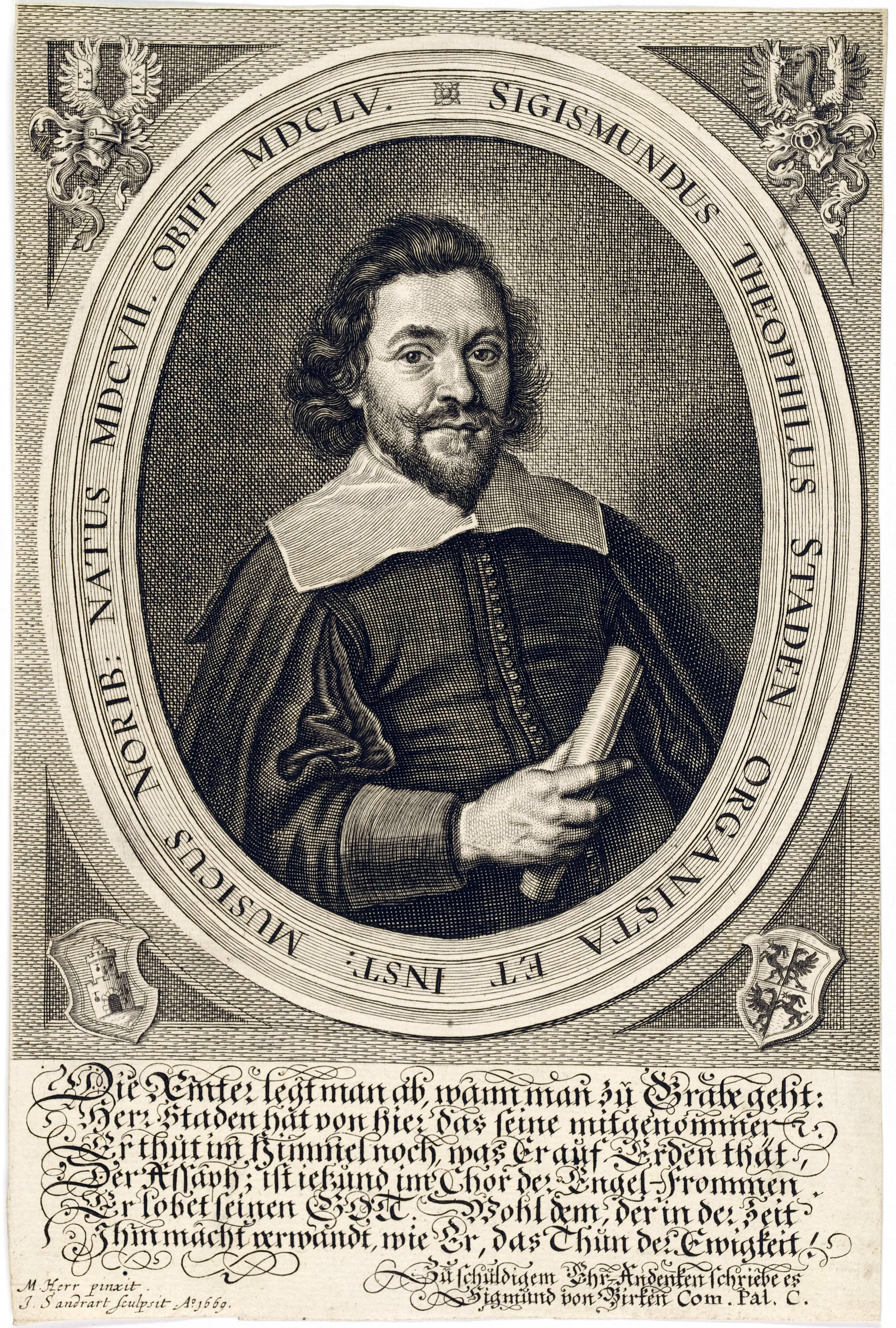
Sigmund Theophil Staden

Sigmund Theophil Staden (6 November 1607 – 30 July 1655) was an important early German composer.

Staden was born in Kulmbach in the Principality of Bayreuth, son of Johann Staden, the founder of the so-called Nuremberg school. Based in Nuremberg, he was the composer of Seelewig (1644), the first German Singspiel. The only other works of his that survive are three Friedens-Gesänge from 1651.

== Recordings ==
- Seelewig (1644) CPO
- Friedens-Seufftzer und Jubel-Geschrey - Musik für Den Westfälischen Frieden. Manfred Cordes. CPO 999 571-2 (1997)
