= Musen-Almanach =

Type of annual literary review in Germany

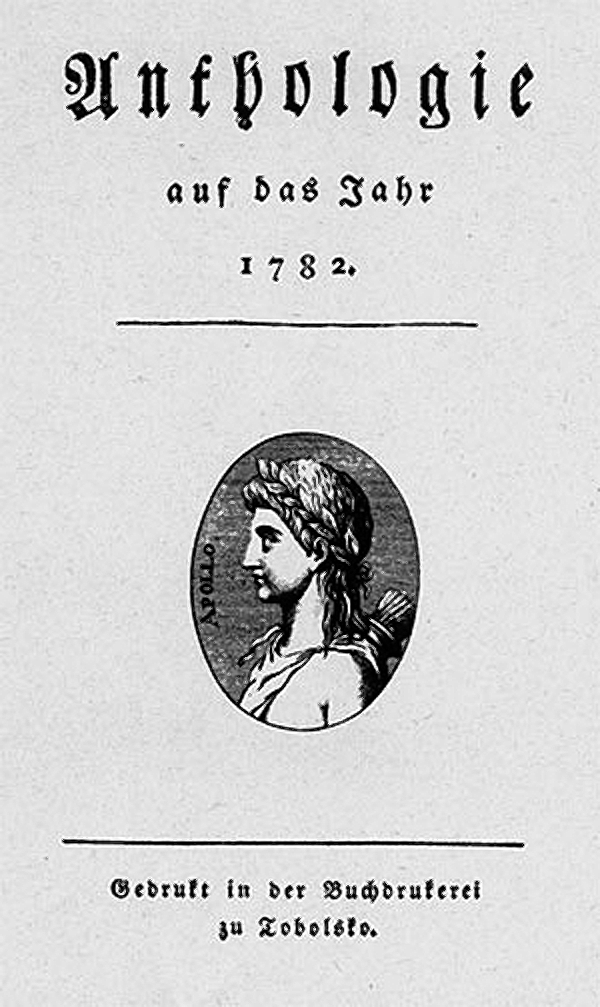
Schiller's Anthologie (1782)

A Musen-Almanach ("Muses' Almanac") was a kind of literary annual, popular in Germany from 1770 into the mid-19th century. They were modelled on the Almanach des Muses published in Paris from 1765.

== Development in the 1770s ==
The first example was Johann Christian Dieterich's Göttinger Musenalmanach (GMA) of 1770. It was promoted by the mathematician Abraham Gotthelf Kästner, and published by Heinrich Christian Boie (in partnership with Friedrich Wilhelm Gotter). As a literary outlet for students at the University of Göttingen, it received contributions from Johann Heinrich Voss, Ludwig Christoph Heinrich Hölty, Johann Martin Miller and his relative Gottlob Dietrich Miller, Johann Friedrich Hahn, Johann Thomas Ludwig Wehrs, Johann Anton Leisewitz, and others. In 1774 Boie made Voss editor, but Voss soon left for Hamburg and started a competing almanac; in spring 1775, he was replaced by Leopold Friedrich Günther Goeckingk; he was joined the next year by Gottfried August Bürger, who became sole editor in 1779. After Bürger's death in 1795 he was replaced by Karl Reinhard.

A semi-pirated imitation by Engelhard Benjamin Schwickert, Leipziger Almanach der deutschen Musen, simultaneously appeared in Leipzig. Despite including nineteen stolen items, it was on sale before the GMA. The editor was Christian Heinrich Schmid, and in subsequent years it would include the work of Friedrich Gottlieb Klopstock, Christian Fürchtegott Gellert, Johann Wilhelm Ludwig Gleim and Karl Wilhelm Ramler. From 1776 it was titled Leipziger Musen-Almanach, and from 1782 Benjamin took over as editor.

The third almanac to appear was that of the Johann Heinrich Voss previously mentioned, the Hamburger Musenalmanach. The first issue of 1776 lost money, and Voss transferred management to Carl Ernst Bohn, but continued to edit, with the help (from 1779 to 1786) of Goeckingk.

In Vienna in 1777, the Wienerischer Musenalmanach (or Wiener Musen-Almanach from 1786) appeared. The editor was Joseph Franz von Ratschky, and he was joined by Aloys Blumauer in 1781, and later by Gottlieb von Leon and Martin Joseph Prandstätter. The last issue appeared in 1796.

== Schiller's Musenalmanach ==
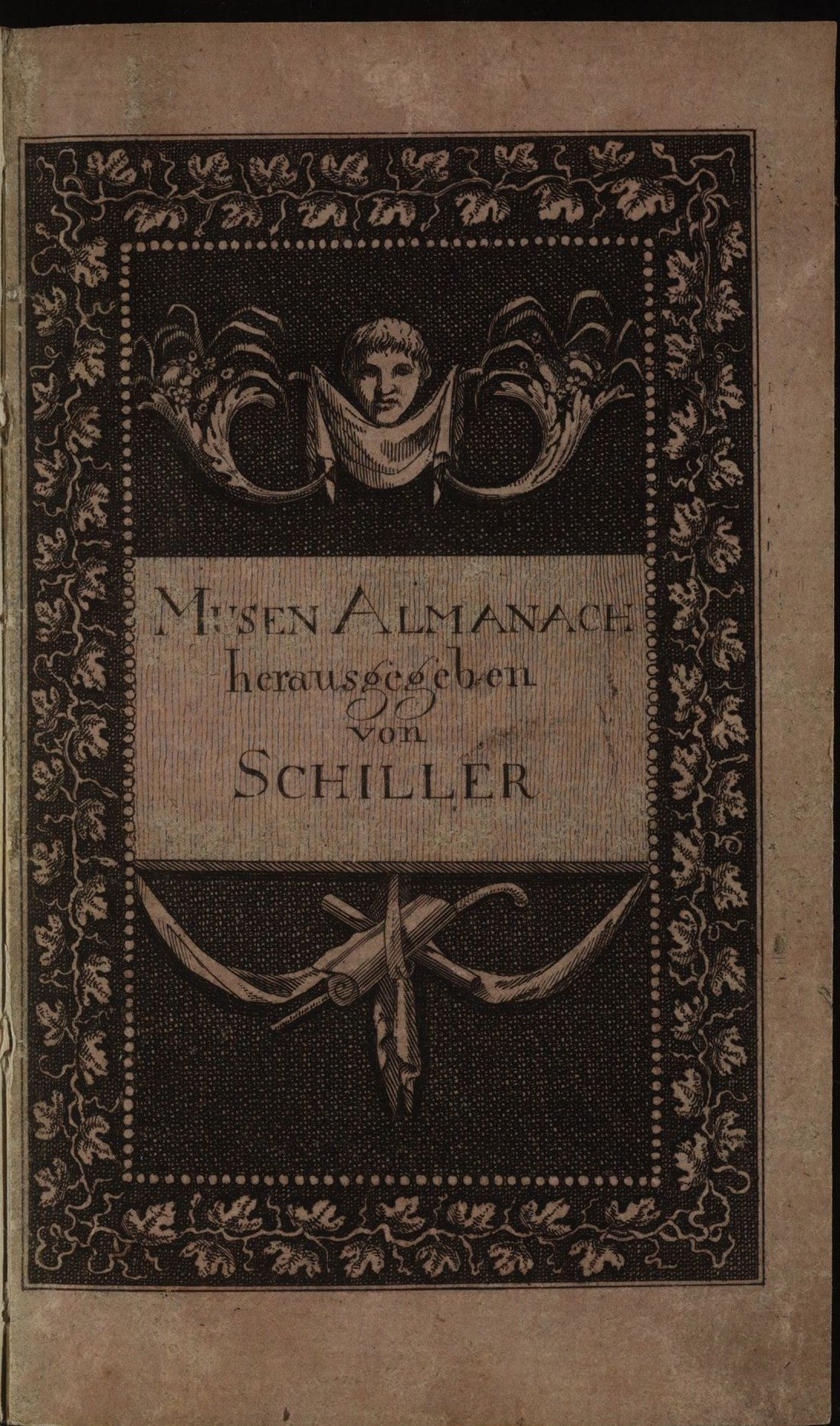
Schiller's Musenalmanach (1796)

Other similar almanacs were less successful, including Friedrich Schiller's Anthologie (1782) which only appeared once. His second attempt was Musen-Almanach (1796–1800) which is the most famous example in the entire genre, because of the contributors: Johann Wolfgang von Goethe, Johann Gottfried Herder, Ludwig Tieck, Friedrich Hölderlin and August Wilhelm Schlegel.

Inspired by his example, there followed Musenalmanache by August Wilhelm Schlegel and Ludwig Tieck (Tübingen 1802), by Johann Bernhard Vermehren (Leipzig 1802 and Jena 1803), the Musenalmanach by Adelbert von Chamisso and Karl August Varnhagen von Ense (1804–1806), the Poetische Taschenbuch of Friedrich Schlegel (Berlin 1805–1806) and the Musenalmanach edited by Leo von Seckendorf (Regensburg 1807–1808).

== Mass marketing, and Taschenbücher ==
The heyday of the almanac was perhaps the 1820s, during which decade they gradually began to appear in England in an etiolated form as literary annuals. In 1823, a writer in the European Magazine of London commented:

In Germany, the most popular species of work is what is called their Almanacs. The booksellers are generally concerned in such speculations, and there is scarce a toilette on which one or several of them are not to be found. Such works contain the coups d'essai of swarms of maiden authors, and with the ephemeral and lighter pieces of writers whose reputation is established. Some of these Almanacs are of a more serious and useful character, and the whole of them are generally bound with taste and fancy, and are ornamented with elegant engravings.

The Musen-Almanach was gradually superseded by the Taschenbuch ("pocket book") and by the literary magazine as we know it today — some still bearing the word Musenalmanach in their titles. However, short-lived annuals of the same kind continued to appear as late as the 1860s.

== Bibliography ==
- Carl Christian Redlich: Versuch eines Chiffernlexikons zu den Göttinger, Voßischen, Schillerschen und Schlegel-Tieckschen Musenalmanachen. Meißner, Hamburg 1875
- Hans Köhring: Bibliographie der Almanache, Kalender und Taschenbücher für die Zeit von ca. 1750 bis 1860. Self-published, Hamburg 1929. Reprinted Bad Karlshafen 1987.
- York-Gothart Mix: Kalender? Ey wie viel Kalender!. Literarische Almanache zwischen Rokoko und Klassizismus. HAB, Wolfenbüttel 1986, ISBN 3-88373-049-1.
- York-Gothart Mix: Die deutschen Musen-Almanache des 18.Jahrhunderts. Beck, München 1987. ISBN 3-406-32332-4
- York-Gothart Mix: Populäre Almanache im frühmodernen Europa. De Gruyter, Berlin 2002. ISBN 3-11-018632-2.
- Maria Gräfin Lanckoronska, Arthur Rümann: Geschichte der deutschen Taschenbücher und Almanache aus der klassisch-romantischen Zeit. H. Th. Wenner, Osnabrück 1985. ISBN 3-87898-301-8
