= Göttinger Musenalmanach =

Two literary magazines published in Germany

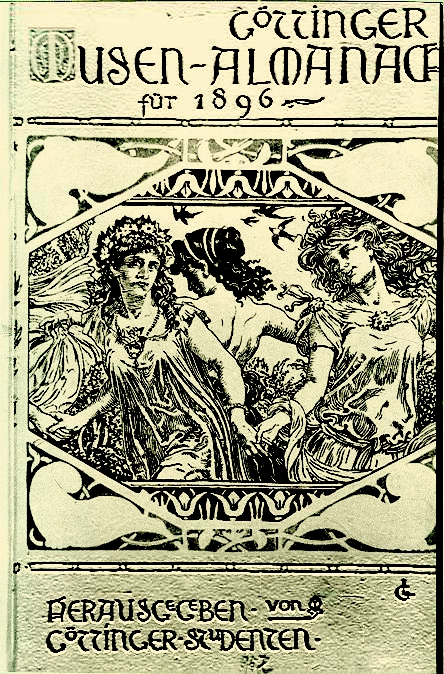
Göttinger Musenalmanach

Göttinger Musenalmanach was the title of two different literary magazines published in Göttingen, Germany, one running from 1770 to 1807, the other 1896 to 1953. A Musen-Almanach was a kind of literary annual, and the Göttingen magazine of 1770 was the first German example.

== Göttinger Musenalmanach (1770–1807) ==
The first issue was published by Johann Christian Dieterich, and edited by Heinrich Christian Boie and Friedrich Wilhelm Gotter. Later issues were sometimes also titled Poetische Blumenlese, or Göttingenscher Musenalmanach. The magazine was taken over by Karl Reinhard, and editions appeared in Waldeck and Münster. The magazine was modelled on French literary magazine Almanach des Muses.

The Göttingische Musenalmanach was the voice of the Göttinger Hainbund, a group of students now classified as part of the Sturm und Drang movement. Members included Boie, Carl Christian Clauswitz, Carl Friedrich Cramer, Christian Hieronymus Esmarch, Schack Hermann Ewald, Johann Friedrich Hahn, Ludwig Christoph Heinrich Hölty, Johann Anton Leisewitz, Johann Martin Miller, Friedrich Leopold zu Stolberg-Stolberg and Johann Heinrich Voss.

Five facsimiles of editions of Göttinger Musenalmanachen (1771, 1772, 1774, 1778 and 1793) are available online:

- Musen Almanach A MDCCLXXI (PDF file; 14.68 MB)
- MVSENALMANACH MDCCLXXII (PDF file; 15.93 MB)
- Musen Almanach A MDCCLXXIV - includes Gottfried August Bürger's "Lenore". (PDF file; 15.24 MB)
- Musen Almanach A MDCCLXXVIII (PDF file; 11.41 MB)
- MVSEN ALMANACH 1793 - includes political poems by G. A. Bürger. (PDF file; 13.49 MB)

== Göttinger Musenalmanach (1896–1953) ==
(An earlier attempt at a revival, Neuer Göttinger Musenalmanach, dates from 1832.)

In 1896 Börries von Münchhausen began a new Göttinger Musenalmanach. It was published by Horstmann until 1905, and then by the University of Göttingen until its final closure in 1953.

== Bibliography ==
- Hans Grantzow: Geschichte des Göttinger und des Vossischen Musenalmanachs. Dissertation, Berlin 1909.
- York-Gothart Mix: Die deutschen Musen-Almanache des 18. Jahrhunderts. Beck, München 1987, ISBN 3-406-32332-4.
- Carl Christian Redlich: Versuch eines Chiffernlexikons zu den Göttinger, Voßischen, Schillerschen und Schlegel-Tieckschen Musenalmanachen. Hamburg 1875. Digitalisat
