= Ernst Theodor Johann Brückner =

German theologian and writer

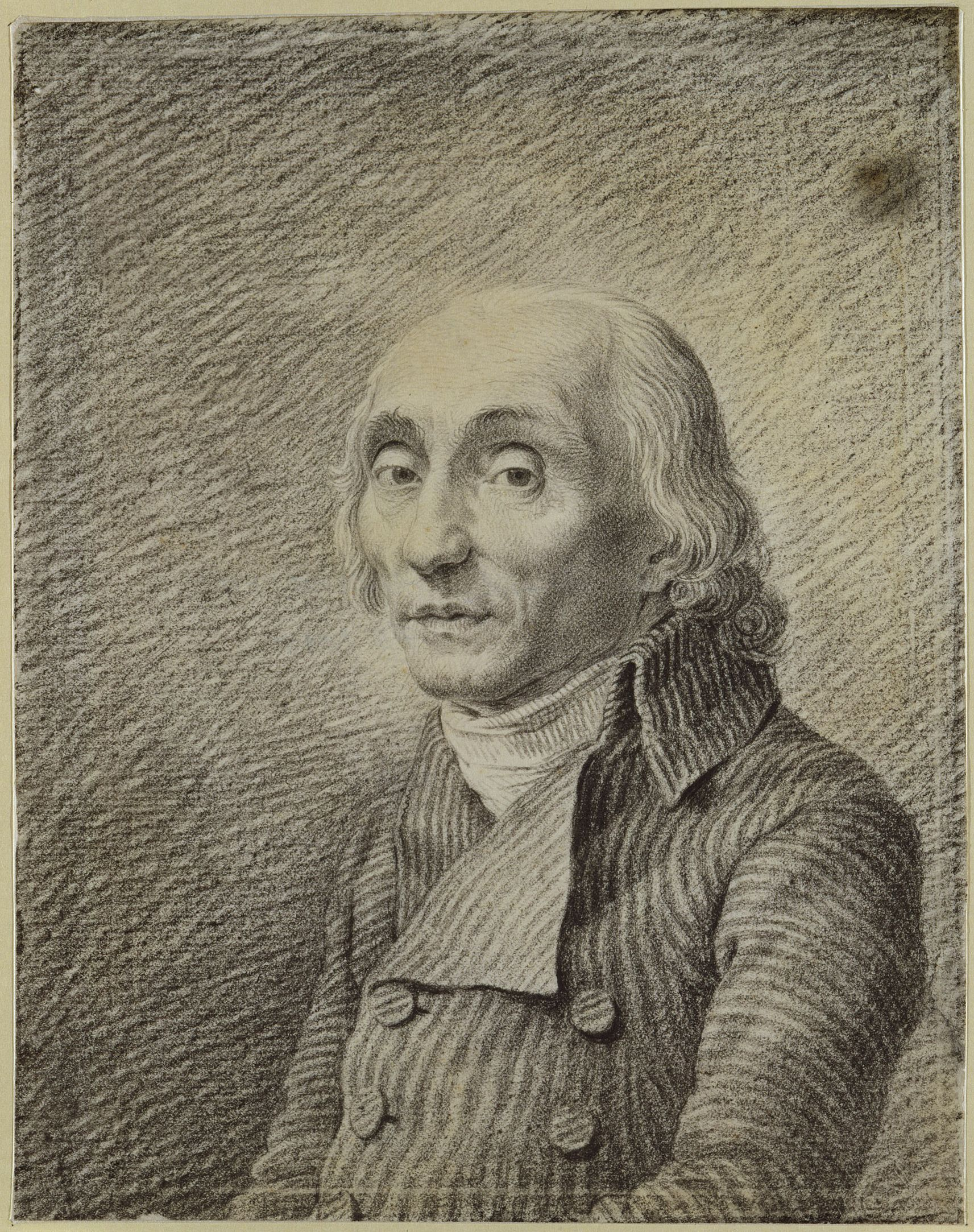
Ernst (Theodor Johann) Brückner, ca 1798. Chalk drawing by Caspar David Friedrich (Hinz 69)

Ernst Theodor Johann Brückner, real name Ernst Brückner, (13 September 1746 – 29 May 1805) was a German theologian and literary. He was the only foreign member of the Göttinger Hainbund.

== Life and work ==
Born in Neetzka, Brückner was the younger son of the Lutheran pastor Christoph (Adam) Brückner (1713–1786) and his wife, the pastor's daughter Sophia, née Trendelenburg (1725–1759). He is thus one of the direct descendants of the important southeast Mecklenburg theologian and superintendent Theodor Trendelenburg (1696–1765). The Neubrandenburg physician and city and district physicist Adolf Brückner (1744–1823) was his brother.

After a long period of home schooling, Brückner attended school in Neubrandenburg and then the Joachimsthalsches Gymnasium in Berlin. He studied Protestant theology at the Martin Luther University of Halle-Wittenberg from 1765 to 1767. He became a substitute in Wesenberg (Mecklenburg) in 1770 and a preacher in Groß Vielen in 1771, where he was friends with Johann Heinrich Voß. Through him, he joined the Göttinger Hainbund, founded in September 1772, which accepted him as an absentee in December 1772. After he had an article printed in the Musen-Almanach edited by Voß, he received a reprimand. In 1789, Brückner became a preacher, then head pastor in Neubrandenburg. In 1772, his dramas appeared anonymously under the title Etwas für die deutsche Schaubühne. A collection of poems did not appear until 1803 in Neustrelitz.

Since 1771, Brückner had been married to the pastor's daughter Dorothea (Helena Beata) Fabricius (1742–1802), with whom he had seven children. One daughter, Margarethe (1772–1820), married Adolf Friedrich (1770–1838), a brother of the painter Caspar David Friedrich.

Bruckner died in Neubrandenburg at the age of 58.

== Legacy ==
Letters from and to Ernst Theodor Johann Brückner were part of a family archive, a large part of which is now kept in the Fritz Reuter Literary Archive Hans-Joachim Griephan in Berlin and, with around 600 units, covers a period from 1557 to 1967. A partial estate is located in the Bayerische Staatsbibliothek.
