= 1770 in literature =

This article contains information about the literary events and publications of 1770.

== Events ==
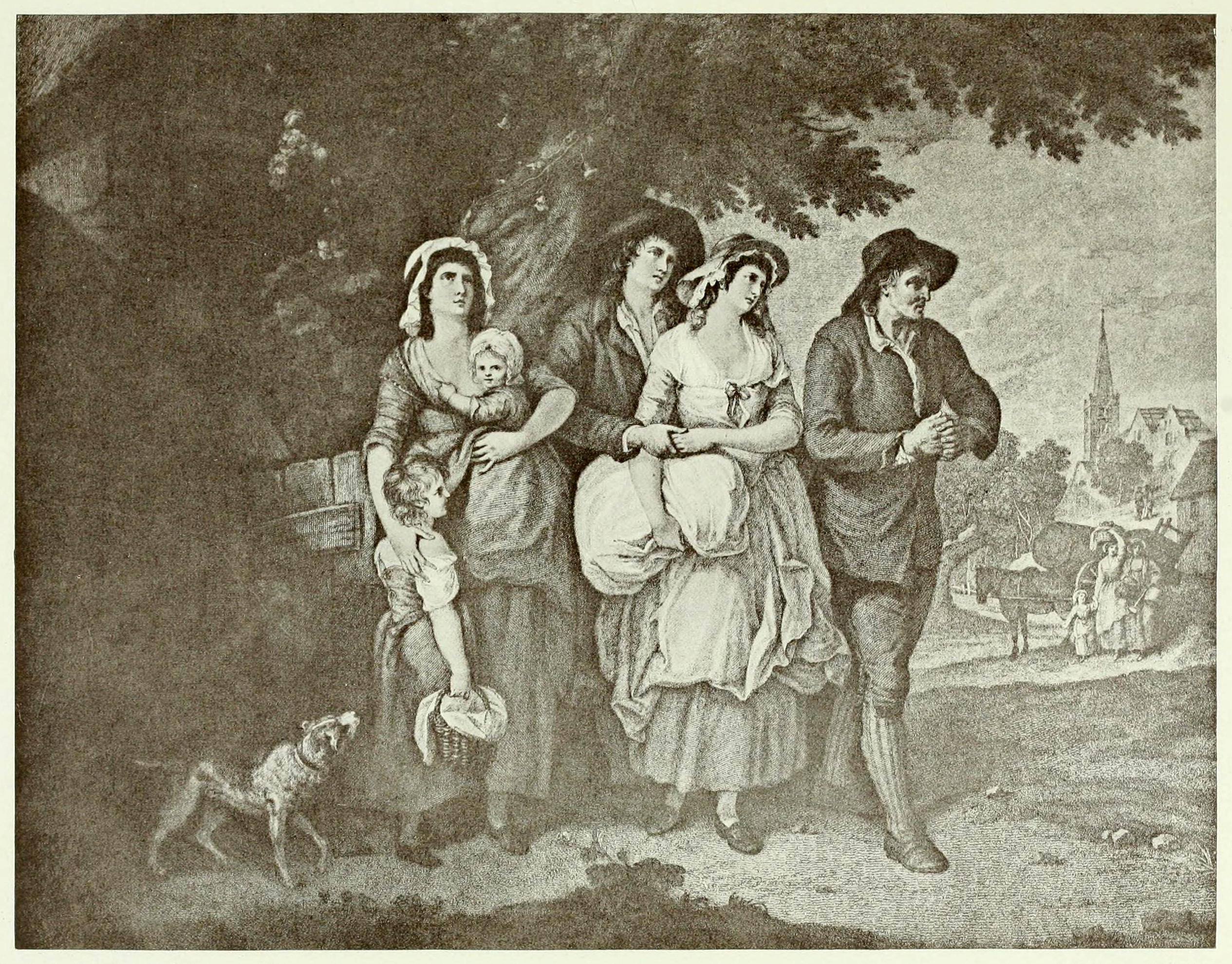
The Deserted Village, engraved by Francesco Bartolozzi after a painting by Francis Wheatley. This image was used in the edition of Oliver Goldsmith's poem published in 1800 by F. J. du Roveray.

- February 1 – Thomas Jefferson's home at Shadwell, Virginia is destroyed by fire, along with most of his books.
- February 6 – Voltaire writes to Abbot la Riche; the letter is said to be the source of his famous statement, "I disagree with what you say, but I will defend to the death your right to say it." ("Je ne suis pas d’accord avec ce que vous dites, mais je défendrai jusqu’à la mort votre droit de le dire.") This is now generally believed to be a misattribution.
- December
  - The Library of the Sorbonne in Paris is opened to the public.
  - After meeting Johann Wolfgang von Goethe in Strasbourg, Johann Gottfried Herder decides to enter the Berlin Academy annual essay competition.
- unknown date – Göttinger Musenalmanach is launched by Johann Christian Dieterich.

== New books ==
=== Prose ===
- John Armstrong – Miscellanies
- James Beattie – An Essay on the Nature and Immutability of Truth
- Edmund Burke – Thoughts on the Cause of the Present Discontents
- William Duff – Critical Observations on the Writings of the Most Celebrated Geniuses in Poetry
- Philip Freneau and Hugh Henry Brackenridge – Father Bombo's Pilgrimage to Mecca (approximate year of composition, fully published 1975, a contender for first American novel)
- Edward Gibbon – Critical Observations on the Sixth Book of the Aeneid
- Oliver Goldsmith:
  - The Life of Thomas Parnell
  - Life of Henry St. John, Lord Viscount Bolingbroke
- Ukawsaw Gronniosaw – A Narrative of the Most Remarkable Particulars in the Life of Ukawsaw Gronniosaw, an African Prince
- Baron d'Holbach – The System of Nature
- Samuel Johnson – The False Alarm
- Immanuel Kant – Dissertation on the Form and Principles of the Sensible and the Intelligible World (De mundi sensibilis atque intelligibilis forma et principiis, inaugural dissertation)
- Catharine Macaulay – Observations on a Pamphlet Entitled, Thoughts on the Present Discontents (in response to Burke)
- Thomas Percy – Northern Antiquities
- Raynal – A Philosophical and Political History of the Settlements and Trade of the Europeans in the East and West Indies
- Catherine Talbot – Reflections on the Seven Days of the Week
- John Horne Tooke – Genuine Copies of All the Letters ... Relative to the Execution of Doyle and Valine
- Augustus Montague Toplady – A Letter to the Rev. Mr. John Wesley
- Voltaire – Épître à l'Auteur du Livre des Trois Imposteurs
- Arthur Young – A Six Months Tour Through the North of England

=== Drama ===
Oh, What a Charming Thing's a Battle!
"Oh, What a Charming Thing's a Battle!", from Charles Dibdin and Isaac Bickerstaff's The Recruiting Serjeant (1770). Sung by Leon Lishner.

- Pierre de Beaumarchais – Les Deux Amis
- Isaac Bickerstaffe – The Recruiting Serjeant
- Frances Brooke – Memoirs of the Marquis de St Forlaix
- George Colman the Elder – Man and Wife
- Johannes Ewald – Rolf Krage
- Samuel Foote – The Lame Lover
- Francis Gentleman – The Sultan
- John Hoole – Timanthes
- Hugh Kelly – A Word to the Wise
- Louis-Sébastien Mercier – Le Déserteur (written)
- George Alexander Stevens – The Court of Alexander
- Ramón de la Cruz – El rastro por la mañana
- Nicolás Fernandez de Moratín – Hormesinda

=== Poetry ===
- Michael Bruce – Poems on Several Occasions
- David Dalrymple – Ancient Scottish Poems
- Oliver Goldsmith – The Deserted Village
- William Woty – Works

== Births ==
- February 16 (bapt.) – Barbara Hofland, English children's and schoolbook author (died 1844)
- March 20 – Friedrich Hölderlin, German poet (died 1843
- April 7 – William Wordsworth, English Romantic poet (died 1850
- October 2 – James Plumptre, English dramatist and cleric (died 1832)
- December 9 (bapt.) – James Hogg, "the Ettrick shepherd", Scottish poet and novelist (died 1835)
- Possible year – John Joseph Stockdale, English editor and publisher (died 1847)

== Deaths ==
- July 2 – James Parker, American printer and publisher (born 1714)
- July 21 – Charlotta Frölich, Swedish poet and political writer (born 1698)
- August 24 – Thomas Chatterton, English poet and forger (suicide, born 1752)
- September 30 – George Whitefield, English-born evangelist (born 1714)
- November 1 – Alexander Cruden, Scottish compiler of Bible concordance (born 1699)
- November 24 – Charles-Jean-François Hénault, French historian (born 1685)
- Approximate date – Alasdair mac Mhaighstir Alasdair, Scottish Gaelic poet (born c. 1698)

== Awards ==
- Prussian Royal Academy of Science: Johann Gottfried Herder, Treatise on the Origin of Language

== Sources ==
- W. Roberts, F. Wheatley, R. A., his life and works (London: Otto Limited, 1910).
