= Göttinger Hainbund =

German literary group

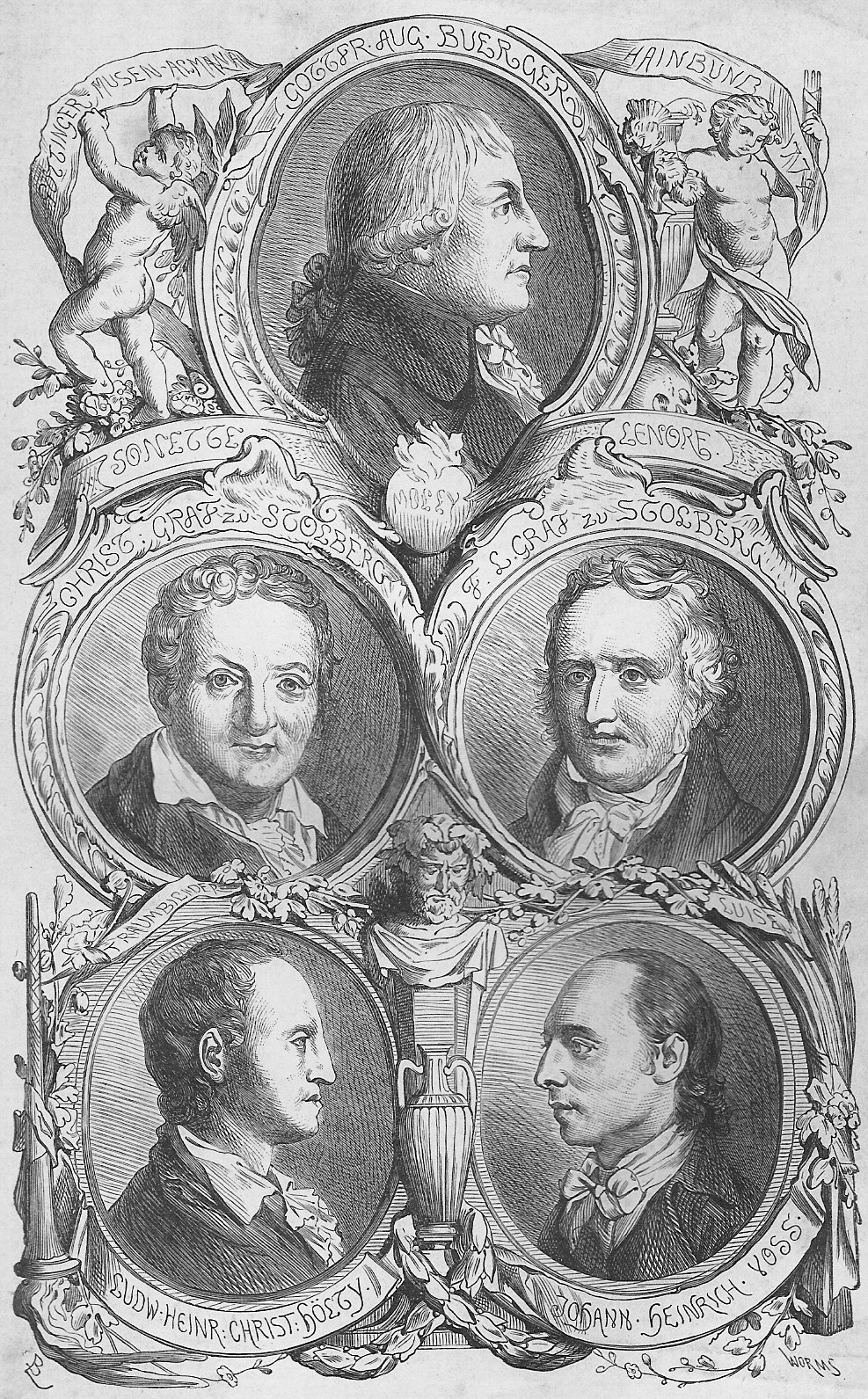
Members and associates

The Göttinger Hainbund ("Grove League of Göttingen") was a German literary group in the late 18th century, nature-loving and classified as part of the Sturm und Drang movement.

== Origin and description ==
It was by means of a midnight ritual in an oaken grove that the Göttinger Hainbund was founded on 12 September 1772 by Johann Heinrich Voss, Ludwig Christoph Heinrich Hölty, Johann Martin Miller, Gottlieb Dieterich von Miller, Johann Friedrich Hahn and Johann Thomas Ludwig Wehrs, in the university town of Göttingen. The members knew one other through their presence at the University of Göttingen or through their contributions to the Göttinger Musenalmanach, a literary annual founded by Heinrich Christian Boie in 1770.

Their evident delight in wilderness and untamed Nature (as a counterweight to the rationalism of the Enlightenment) is what scholars use to connect them to Sturm und Drang, although not all commentators agree on who influenced whom, and in what way.

In the poetry of the 48-year-old Friedrich Gottlieb Klopstock they found their ideal. Their respect for him ran parallel to their disdain for Christoph Martin Wieland's jesting poetry, which they saw as frivolous, Frenchified work. On 2 July 1773, they celebrated Klopstock's birthday:

Klopstock's chair, adorned with roses and carnations, stood at the head of the long table, also decorated with flowers; on it were placed the works of the poet, while under the chair lay Wieland's Idris torn up. "Cramer," relates Voss, "read some of Klopstock's odes having relation to Germany; then we took coffee, and made lighters for our pipes out of Wieland's writings. Even Boie, who did not smoke, was compelled to light one and to stamp upon the torn Idris. Afterwards we drank, in Rhine wine, to the health of Klopstock, the League, Ebert, Goethe, and Herder, and to the memory of Luther and Hermann. Klopstock's "Ode to Rhine Wine," and some others, were read. Conversation then flowed freely. With hats on, we talked about liberty and Germany and virtue; you can just imagine how. Then we supped, and finally burnt Wieland's Idris and likeness. Whether Klopstock has heard of our doings, or only guessed at them, I do not know; but he has written to ask for a description of the day."

Wieland was untroubled and responded generously, referring to the members of the Hainbund, in a letter to Friedrich Heinrich Jacobi, as "well-meaning" youngsters without experience of the world. In fact, by 1779, Voss was counted among Wieland's friends.

The term Hainbund refers to Klopstock's ode "Der Hügel und der Hain" ("The Hill and the Grove", 1767), which contrasts citified Ancient Greek artistic ideals (symbolised by Mount Parnassus) with the simple rural virtue of the German bard. The two literary predecessors, Poet and Barde, vie for the allegiance of the modern Dichter. The Poet condemns the "voice of coarse Nature", but the Barde wins by emphasizing the closer spiritual connection he holds with the living German, and the Dichter exclaims:

Des Hügels Quell ertönet von Zeus, Von Wodan der Quell des Hains. Weck' ich aus dem alten Untergange Götter; Zu Gemählden des fabelhaften Liedes auf;	The fountain of the hill resounds to Zeus, To Woden does the copse's spring belong. If I awaken gods whose sun hath set, To lovely paintings of their mythic song,
So haben die in Teutoniens Hain; Edlere Züge für mich! Mich weilet dann der Achäer Hügel nicht: Ich geh zu dem Quell des Hains!	Then shall they have in Germania's woods Nobler paths for me on which to rove! 'Tis not the Achaean hill that me awaits: I go unto the fountain in the grove!

Another father figure (although not a member) was Gottfried August Bürger. He and Hölty are known as the inventors of the German Kunstballade ("art ballad").

On Sunday, 18 September 1774, Klopstock passed through the city and paid them a visit. He had intended to leave early the next morning, but transportation was difficult to find, and to their delight he spent nearly the whole of the Monday in their company.

In 1775, most of its members having completed their education, the Hainbund gradually broke up as they returned to their home cities.

== Members ==
- Heinrich Christian Boie
- Ernst Theodor Johann Brückner
- Carl Christian Clauswitz
- Carl August Wilhelm von Closen
- Carl Friedrich Cramer
- Christian Hieronymus Esmarch
- Schack Hermann Ewald
- Johann Friedrich Hahn
- Ludwig Christoph Heinrich Hölty
- Johann Anton Leisewitz
- Johann Martin Miller
- Gottlieb Dieterich von Miller
- Christian zu Stolberg-Stolberg
- Friedrich Leopold zu Stolberg-Stolberg
- Johann Heinrich Voß
- Johann Thomas Ludwig Wehrs

== Associates ==
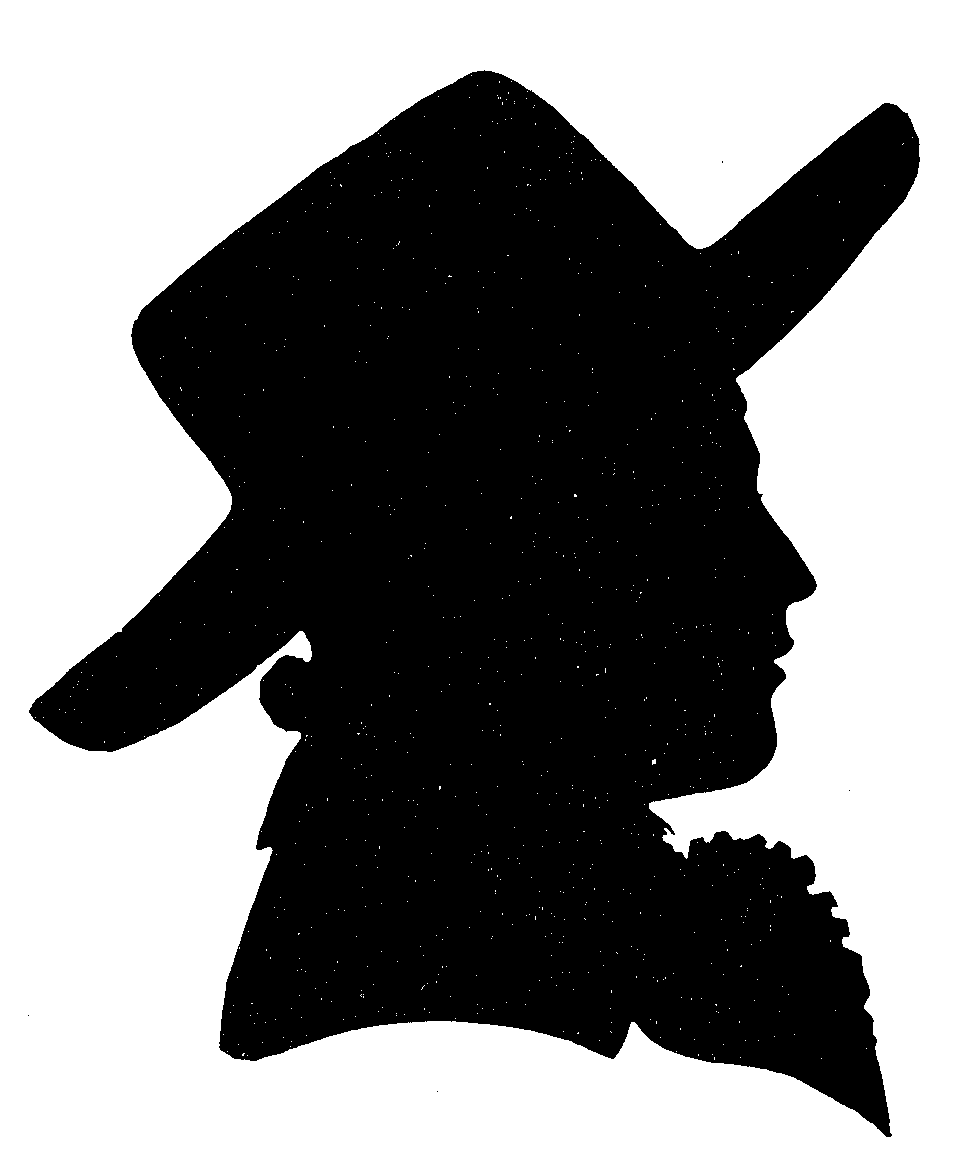
Silhouette of Joseph Martin Kraus, cut when he was at Göttingen

- Gottfried August Bürger
- Matthias Claudius
- Friedrich de la Motte Fouqué
- Leopold Friedrich Günther von Goeckingk
- Friedrich Wilhelm Gotter
- Friedrich Gottlieb Klopstock
- Joseph Martin Kraus
- Christian Adolph Overbeck
- Gottlob Friedrich Ernst Schönborn
- Christian Friedrich Daniel Schubart
- Johann Gottfried Friedrich Seebach
- Anton Matthias Sprickmann

== Bibliography ==
- Bäsken, Rothraut: Die Dichter des Göttinger Hains und die Bürgerlichkeit. Eine literarsoziologische Studie. Königsberg, Berlin 1937
- Grantzow, Hans: Die Geschichte des Göttinger und des Vossischen Musenalmanachs. Univ. Diss., Berlin 1909
- Jansen, Heinz: Aus dem Göttinger Hainbund. Overbeck und Sprickmann. Münster 1933
- Kahl, Paul: Das Bundesbuch des Göttinger Hains. Edition - Historische Untersuchung - Kommentar. Tübingen 2006.
- Kindermann, H.: Göttinger Hain. Stichwort in: Paul Merker, Wolfgang Stammler (Hrsg.): Reallexikon der deutschen Literaturgeschichte, Bd. 1. Berlin 1925/1926, S. 456-462
- Kohlschmidt, Werner: Göttinger Hain. In: Reallexikon der deutschen Literaturgeschichte. 2. Aufl. Bd. 1. Berlin 1958. S. 597-601
- Lüchow, Annette: Die heilige Cohorte. Klopstock und der Göttinger Hainbund. In: Kevin Hilliard, Katrin Kohl (Hrsg.): Klopstock an der Grenze der Epochen. Berlin, New York 1995, S. 152-220
- Pohlmann, Axel: Der Hain und die Loge. In: Quatuor Coronati Jahrbuch, Nr. 38, Bayreuth 2001, S. 129-149
- Prutz, R.E.: Der Göttinger Dichterbund. Zur Geschichte der deutschen Literatur, Leipzig 1841
- Sauer, August: Die Dichtungen des Göttinger Hainbunds, 1887
- Schachner, Walter: Das Generationsproblem in der Geistesgeschichte. Mit einem Exkurs über den Hainbund. Gießen 1937, Nachdruck Amsterdam 1968.
- Thomalla, Erika: Die Erfindung des Dichterbundes. Die Medienpraktiken des Göttinger Hains. Göttingen 2018.
- Weinhold, Karl: Heinrich Christian Boie. Halle 1868
- Windfuhr, Emil Ernst: Freimaurer im Göttinger Hain. Die Gebrüder Stolberg, Voss, Claudius, Bürger und ihre Beziehungen zur Freimaurerei. Freimaurerische Schriftenreihe Nr. 12. Frankfurt/Main, Hamburg, Mainz o.J. (ca. 1955)
