= Gottfried Müller =

Gottfried Müller may refer to:

- Gottfried Müller (jurist) (1796–1881), German jurist
- Gottfried Müller (philanthropist) (1914–2009), German philanthropist
- Gottfried Müller (composer) (1914–1993), German composer
- Gottfried Müller (politician) (born 1934), German politician
