= Johann Thomas Ludwig Wehrs =

Johann Thomas Ludwig Wehrs (18 July 1751, in Göttingen – 26 January 1811, in Isernhagen) was a German theologian and a founder of the Göttinger Hainbund literary group.

Wehrs, the son of an official, studied theology from 1769 to 1775. His knowledge of French, English and Italian led in 1772 to his being invited to be part of the Hainbund. Just one poem by him appeared in the Göttinger Musenalmanach of 1777. The poet Hölty died in his arms in 1776 in Hanover, during Wehrs's employment as house tutor (1775–79). In 1780 he became a pastor in Kirchhorst near Hannover, moving in 1788 to Isernhagen.

== Bibliography ==
- Max Mendheim: Wehrs, Johann Thomas Ludwig. In: Allgemeine Deutsche Biographie (ADB). Band 41, Duncker & Humblot, Leipzig 1896, pages 440-1
- Walter Schachner: Das Generationsproblem in der Geistesgeschichte. Gießen 1937, p. 49.
- Karl Geodeke, Eduard Goetze: Grundriss zur Geschichte der deutschen Dichtung, 3. Aufl., 4. Bd., 1. Abt., Dresden 1916, p. 1050
- Moritz Heyne: Mitteilungen zur Vorgeschichte der Loge Augusta zum goldenen Zirkel... Göttingen 1896, p. 17;
- Alfred Kelletat: Der Göttinger Hain, Stuttgart 1967 -Reclam Nr. 8789-93-, p. 396
