= Johann Bernhard Vermehren =

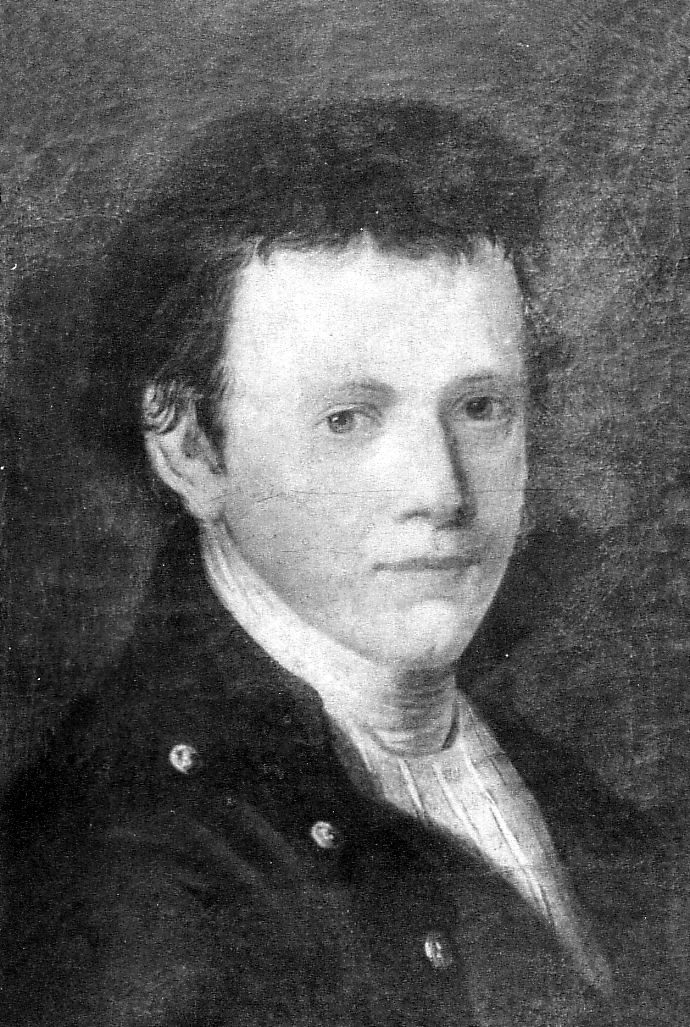
Johann Bernhard Vermehren

Johann Bernhard Vermehren (6 June 1777 in Lübeck – 29 November 1803 in Jena) was an early Romantic poet and scholar.

He earned a doctoral degree in philosophy from the University of Jena in 1799, obtaining habilitation one year later and teaching as Privatdozent until his early death from scarlet fever.

His first poems appeared in Friedrich Schiller's Musenalmanach. The appearance in 1800 of his ten Letters on a Reassessment of Friedrich Schlegel's "Lucinde" brought him to the attention of the author in question; however, in general, criticism of the 350-page work was biting, and it was quickly superseded by Friedrich Schleiermacher's Vertraute Briefe ("Familiar letters") on the same subject. With Schlegel's assistance, Vermehren produced two issues of his own Musenalmanach, the first at Leipzig in 1802 and the second at Jena the next year. They contained fifteen poems by Schlegel and the work of Sophie Mereau (1770–1806), Stephan August Winkelmann (1780–1806), Klopstock and Hölderlin.

Family tradition ascribed to him the book Jesus, wie er lebte und lehrte which was published in Halle in 1799, and in the last year of his life he wrote a fairy-tale, "Schloss Rosenthal" ("Rosenthal Castle"). On 2 December 1803, Goethe mentioned the death slightingly in a letter to Schiller: "Poor Vermehren has died. Probably he would still be living had he continued writing his mediocre verse. The post office job has proved fatal."

Vermehren married on 20 April 1801. His wife was Henriette Eber, twelve years older, a widow of the Jena Postmaster and daughter of the privy councillor Prof. Johann Ludwig von Eckardt (1732–1800). They had one son, Johann Bernhard Vermehren, who would become a privy councillor in the Supreme Court of Appeals for the Ernestine duchies. After Vermehren's death, Henriette (died 1842) married the mathematician Johann Heinrich Voigt (1751–1823).

== Bibliography ==
- Peter Guttkuhn: Vergebens um Goethes und Schillers Gunst gebuhlt. Zum 200. Todestag des Romantikers Johann Bernhard Vermehren. In: Lübeckische Blätter, Lübeck 2003, pages 325–329.
- Oskar F. Walzel: Vermehren: Johann Bernhard. In: Allgemeine Deutsche Biographie (ADB). Band 39, Duncker & Humblot, Leipzig 1895, pages 623–626.
