= Siegwart, eine Klostergeschichte =

1776 novel by Johann Martin Miller

Siegwart, eine Klostergeschichte ("Siegwart, a Tale of the Cloister", 1776) was a novel by Johann Martin Miller. It was a bestseller. Dedicated "to all noble souls", and clearly imitating Die Leiden des jungen Werthers, the novel tells two parallel love stories, one happy, the other sad (as foretold by a gypsy woman at the beginning of Part Two). It was published by Weygand at Leipzig.

== Plot introduction ==
A man from Oettingen in Bayern named Xaver Siegwart, the youngest of five siblings, has grown up on the banks of the Danube after the early death of his mother. Restless and active as a boy, excited at the idea of becoming a hunter like his father, he becomes an impressionable youth, in love with silence and the natural world.

He accompanies his father to a Capuchin monastery where he is visiting his friend Father Anton. After walking through a beautiful wood, they arrive just as the sun is setting among the oaks, and the impressions made by the play of light on wet cobwebs, the sounds of the bells, and the saintliness of the monks, lead him to religion. Years later he travels to Ingolstadt with the fixed purpose of entering the ministry.

But his plans are disrupted by the social whirl of Ingolstadt, firstly by his entanglement with a woman named Sophie who has fallen violently in love with him, and secondly when he himself falls in love with Mariane Fischer. The match is encouraged by his friend Kronhelm, who admits his own love for Xaver's sister Therese. Mariane returns Xaver's passion, but her father, a court councillor, wishes her to marry another councillor's son, and after facing her intransigence he forces her to enter a convent, where she falls gravely ill. Xaver plans to elope with her, but he is given false news of her death, and he himself enters a monastery. Four years later he encounters her by accident and recognizes her as his Mariane — but she is at the point of death, and soon afterwards he dies also of grief, found sprawled in the moonlight at her grave. This dismal ending is mitigated only by the happy marriage of Kronhelm and Therese Siegwart.

An English translation by Laetitia Matilda Hawkins, Siegwart, a Monastic Tale, appeared in 1806. The most recent German reprint dates from 1971.
