= Rudolf Erich Raspe =

German author and scientist (1736–1794)

Rudolf Erich Raspe FRS
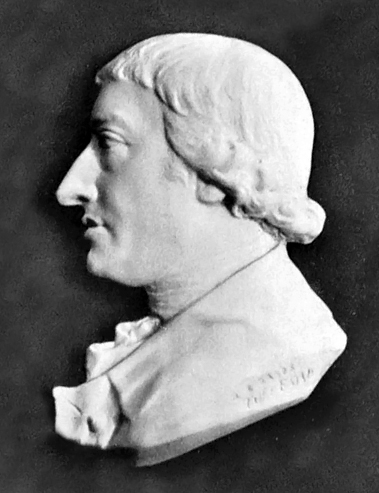
- A medallion relief portrait of Raspe by the Scottish engraver James Tassie
- Born: March 1736; Hanover, Electorate of Hanover, Kingdom of Great Britain
- Died: 16 November 1794 (aged 58); Killarney, Kingdom of Ireland, Kingdom of Great Britain
- Notable work: Baron Munchausen's Narrative of His Marvellous Travels and Campaigns in Russia

Rudolf Erich Raspe (March 1736 – 16 November 1794) was a German librarian, writer, and scientist, called by his biographer John Patrick Carswell a "rogue". He is best known for his collection of tall tales The Surprising Adventures of Baron Munchausen, also known as Baron Munchausen's Narrative of his Marvellous Travels and Campaigns in Russia, originally a satirical work with political aims.

== Life and work ==
Raspe was born in Hanover, and baptised on 28 March 1736. He studied law and jurisprudence at Göttingen and Leipzig and worked as a librarian for the university of Göttingen. In 1762, he became a clerk in the university library at Hanover, and in 1764 secretary to the university library at Göttingen. He had become known as a versatile scholar and a student of natural history and antiquities, and he published some original poems and also translations of Ossian's poems. In 1765 he published the first collection of Leibniz's philosophical works. He also wrote a treatise on Thomas Percy's Reliques of Ancient English Poetry.

In 1767, he was appointed professor in Cassel, and subsequently librarian. He contributed in 1769 a zoological paper to the 59th volume of the Philosophical Transactions, which led to his being elected a Fellow of the Royal Society of London, and he wrote voluminously on all sorts of subjects. In 1774, he started a periodical called the Cassel Spectator. From 1767, he was responsible for some collections of Frederick II, Landgrave of Hesse-Kassel (or Hesse-Cassel). He had to flee to England in 1775 after having gone to Italy in 1775 to buy curios for the Landgrave. He was found to have sold the Landgrave's valuables for his own profit. He was ejected from the Royal Society that same year for his 'divers frauds and gross breaches of trust'.

In London, he employed his knowledge of English and his learning to secure a living by publishing and translating books on various subjects. Besides helping translate Georg Forster's A Voyage Round the World into German, he also translated German works into English, and there are allusions to him as "a Dutch savant" in 1780 in the writings of Horace Walpole, who gave him money and helped him to publish an Essay on the Origin of Oil-painting (1781). But Raspe remained poor, and the Royal Society expunged his name from its list.

From 1782 to 1788, he was employed by Matthew Boulton as assay-master and storekeeper in the Dolcoath mine in Cornwall. At the same time, he also authored books in geology and the history of art.

The Trewhiddle Ingot, found in 2003, is a lump of tungsten found at Trewhiddle Farm and thought to be at least 150 years old. This may predate the earliest known smelting of the metal (which requires extremely high temperatures) and has led to speculation that it may have been produced during a visit by Raspe to Happy-Union mine (at nearby Pentewan) in the late eighteenth century. Raspe was also a chemist with a particular interest in tungsten. Memories of his ingenuity remained to the middle of the 19th century. While in Cornwall, he seems to have written the original version of Munchausen; whether he also wrote the several continuations that appeared until 1792 is still debated.

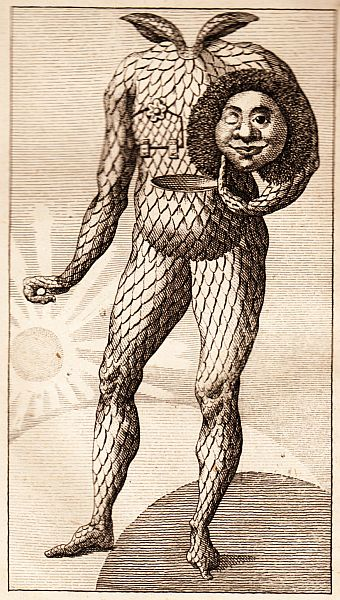
Picture from an old Dutch edition of Münchhausen (R. E. Raspe, De verrezen Gulliver. Amsterdam, 1827.)

He also worked for the famous publisher John Nichols on several projects, among which was a descriptive catalogue he compiled of James Tassie's collection of pastes and casts of gems, in two quarto volumes (1791) of laborious industry and bibliographical rarity. Raspe then went to Scotland, and in Caithness found a patron in Sir John Sinclair of Ulbster, whose mineralogical proclivities he proceeded to impose upon by pretending to discover valuable and workable veins on his estates. Raspe had "salted" the ground himself, and on the verge of exposure, he absconded. He finally moved to Ireland where he managed a copper mine on the Herbert Estate in Killarney. He died in Killarney, Magunihy, of typhoid, in November 1794.

The Baron Munchausen tales were made famous when they were 'borrowed', translated into German, and embellished somewhat by Gottfried August Bürger in 1786—and have been among the favourite reading of subsequent generations, as well as the basis of several films, including Terry Gilliam's The Adventures of Baron Munchausen inspired by the Karel Zeman (Czech director) movie The Fabulous Baron Munchausen, made twenty years before (Baron Prášil 1961). Others during Raspe's lifetime were also aware of his authorship of the Adventures, including his friend John Hawkins, the geologist and traveller to Greece who mentions Raspe's authorship in a letter to Charles Lyell. It was not till 1824 that the biographer of Bürger revealed the truth about the book.

Raspe's dubious mining activities in Scotland provided the model for the character of Herman Dousterswivel, a German mining swindler in Walter Scott's novel The Antiquary (1816), which was set in Scotland in the late 18th century. In a preface to the novel, Scott himself noted that the Dousterswivel character might seem "forced and improbable", but wrote: "... the reader may be assured that this part of the narrative is founded on a fact of actual occurrence."
