= Johann Martin Miller =

German theologian and writer (1750-1814)

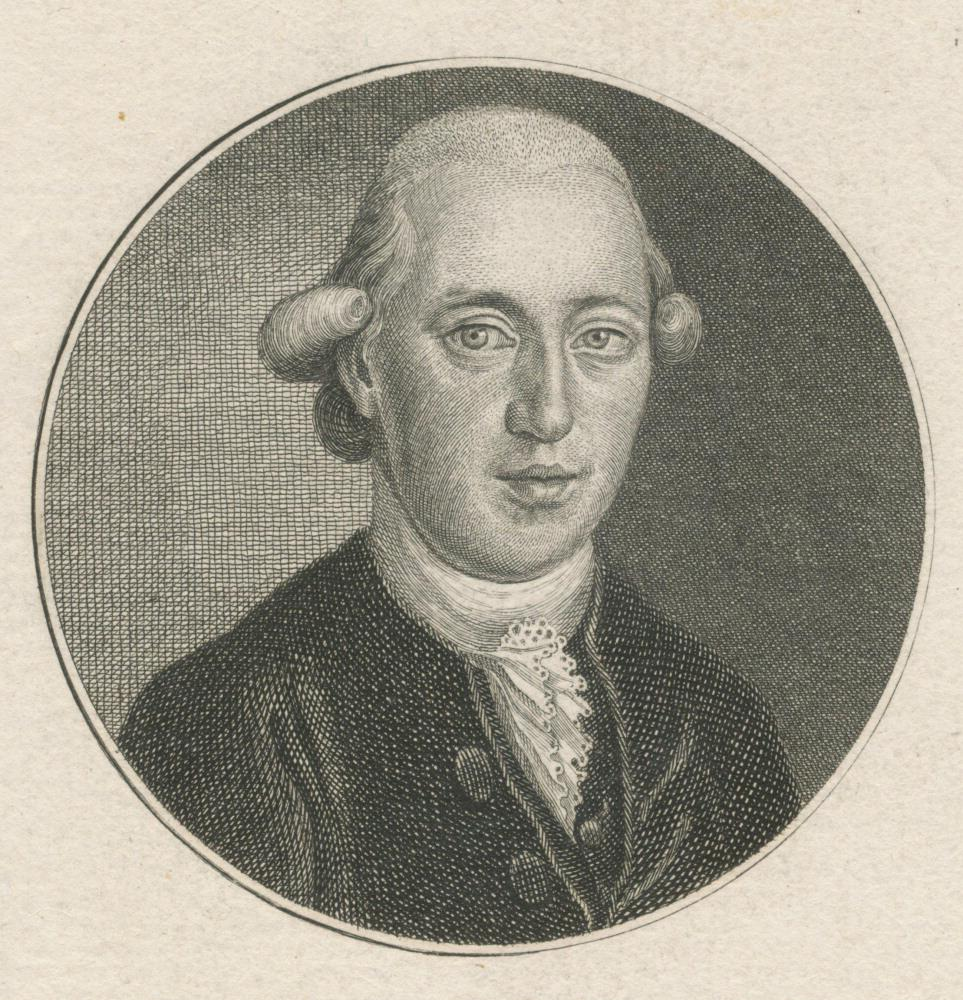
Johann Martin Miller, copperplate

Johann Martin Miller (3 December 1750 in Ulm – 21 June 1814 in Ulm) was a German theologian and writer. He is best known for his novel Siegwart, which became one of the most successful books at the time.

== Life ==
Miller, the son of the Evangelical pastor Johann Michael Miller (1722–1774), was born in Jungingen, nowadays part of the city of Ulm. From 15 October 1770, he studied theology at the University of Göttingen, where he helped to establish the Göttinger Hainbund. Through this literary group, founded in 1772, Miller became acquainted with Matthias Claudius, Gottfried August Bürger, Ludwig Christoph Heinrich Hölty, Johann Heinrich Voss, and Friedrich Gottlieb Klopstock. In 1774 he accompanied Klopstock from Göttingen to Hamburg. In 1774 and 1775 he studied in Leipzig.

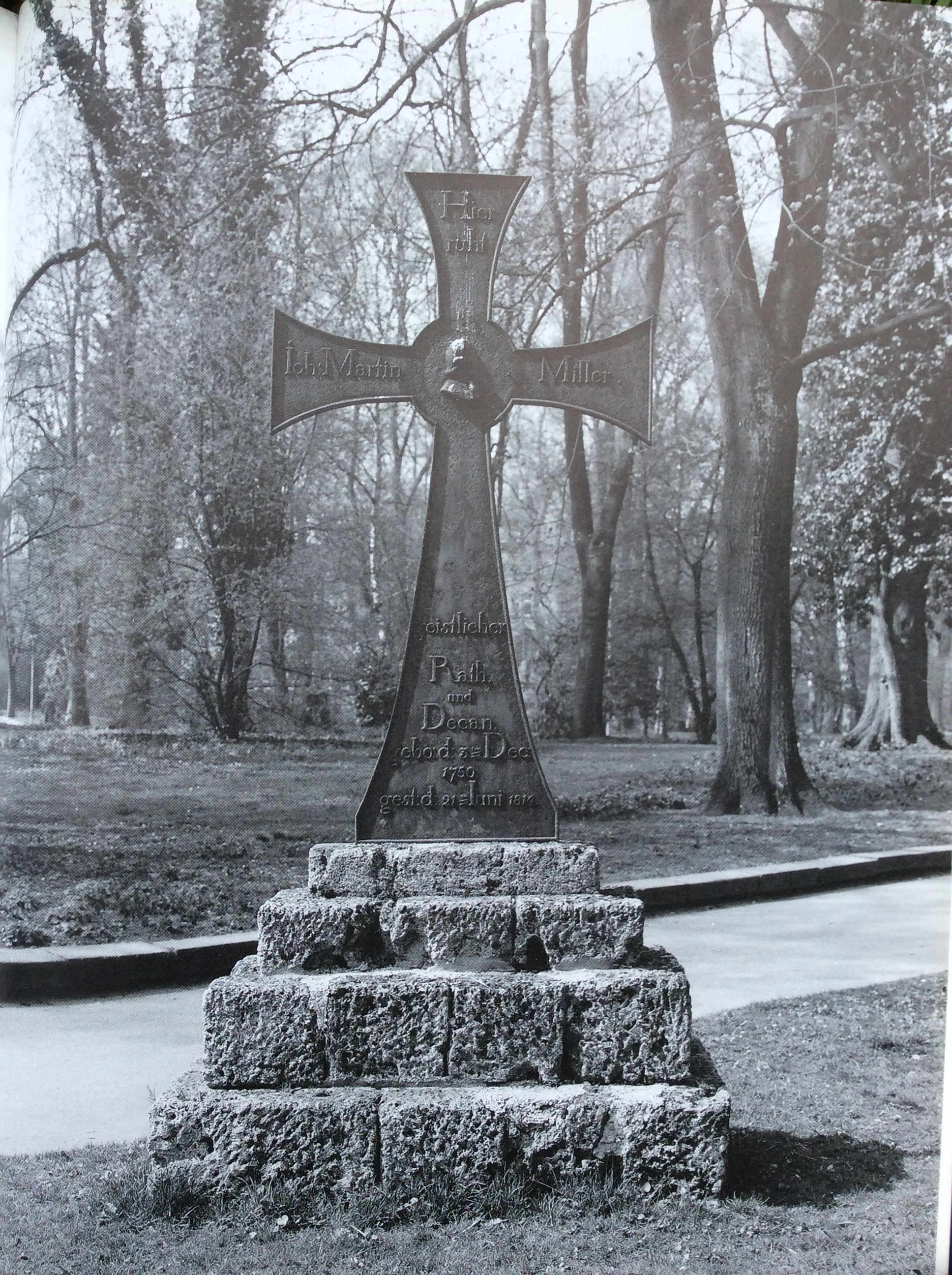
Monument on Miller's grave at the Old Cemetery, Ulm

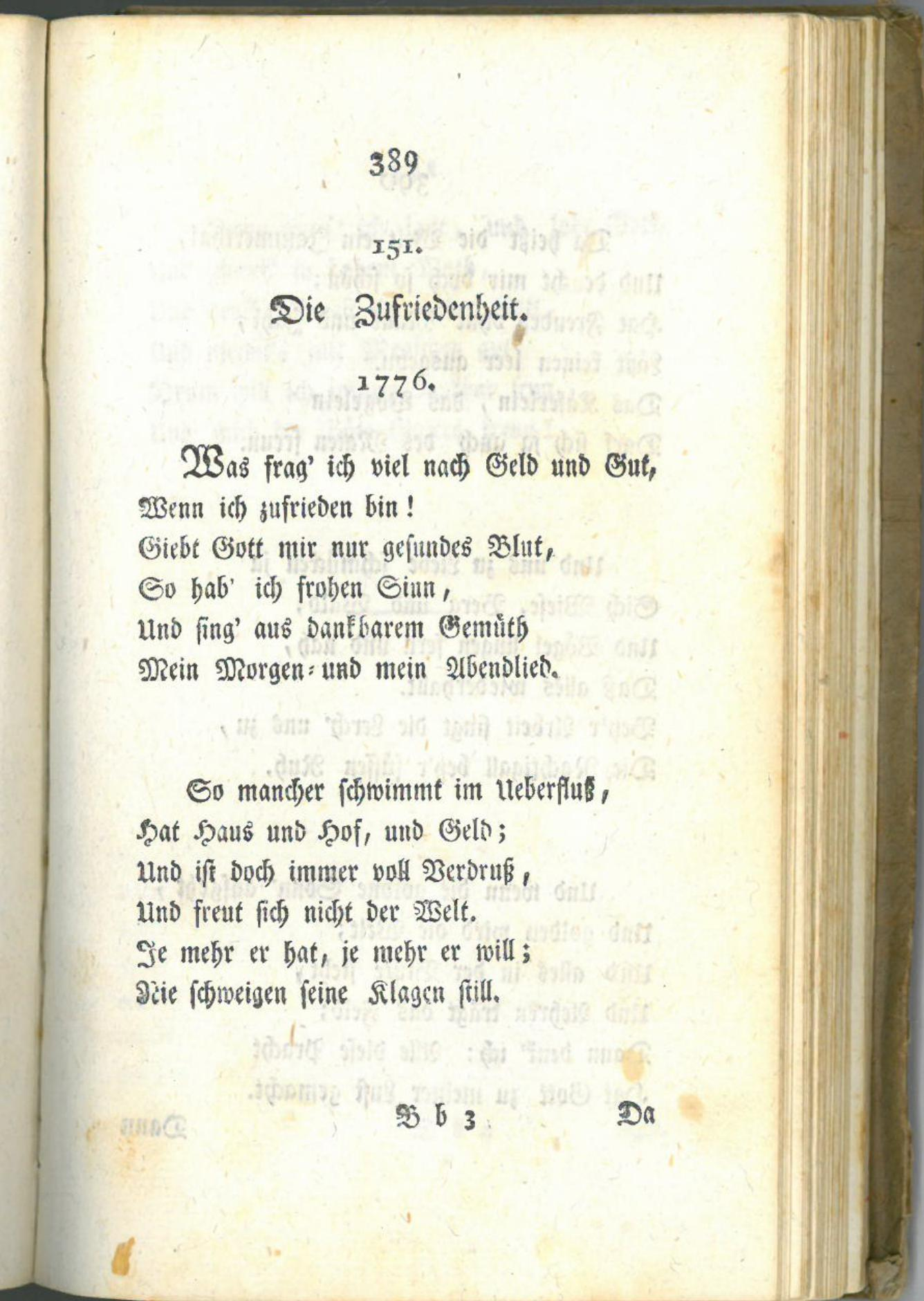
"Die Zufriedenheit" from the 1783 edition

During his years in Göttingen, Miller mainly wrote folk songs, many of which were set to music during his lifetime and are still found in different songbooks today. "Die Zufriedenheit" ("Contentedness"), his most popular poem, was set to music by Wolfgang Amadeus Mozart, Ludwig van Beethoven, and Christian Gottlob Neefe ("Was frag ich viel nach Geld und Gut, / Wenn ich zufrieden bin" ("What need have I of funds and goods / While I am just content"). His particular tone as well as the sound of his plain verses were well known to contemporary writers, such as Friedrich Schiller, Johann Wolfgang von Goethe and Karl Philipp Moritz, and authors of later generations, such as Eduard Mörike and Friedrich Rückert.

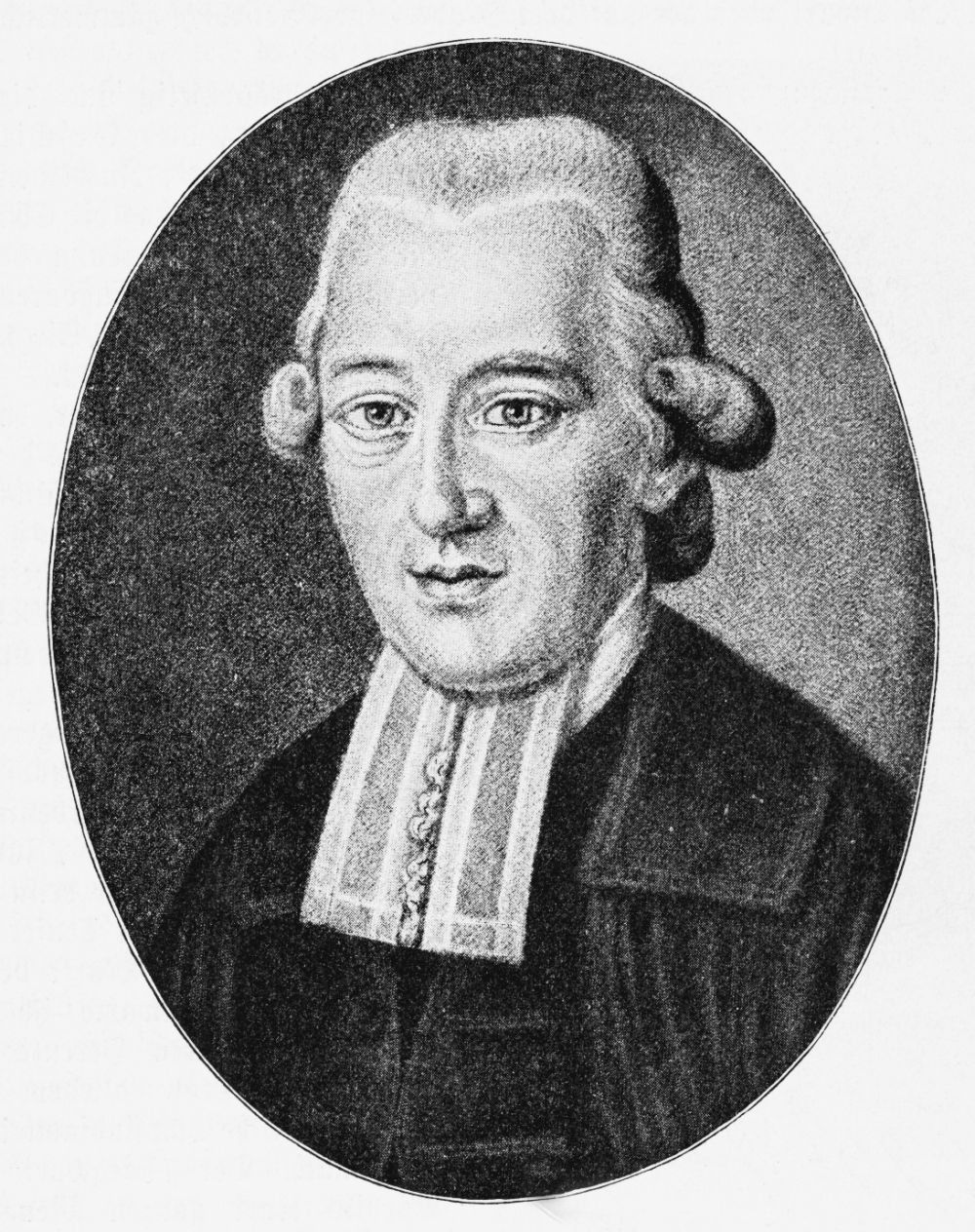
Johann Martin Miller, copperplate by J. J. Haid

After he had returned to his hometown, he published in 1776 the sentimental novel Siegwart. Eine Klostergeschichte ("Siegwart, a Monastic Tale"), which he had already begun to work on in Göttingen - a great success which, accordings to the number of reprints and similar to Goethe's The Sorrows of Young Werther, became one of the best sold novels of the time. From 1776 to 1777 appeared his Briefwechsel dreyer Akademischer Freunde ("Correspondence of Three Friends at the Academy"), an epistolary novel, once described as "an example of the diversity of intellectual currents ... in the Age of Enlightenment". Miller was connected to many contemporary intellectuals of the Enlightenment period, such as Friedrich Nicolai and Friedrich Maximilian Klinger. Later on, Miller seemed to have failed in developing new topics and materials. His later novels could not repeat the surprising success of debut. It is certain that at the very latest in 1790 he ceased to work as an author.

After his student years in Göttingen, Miller was active in Ulm and its surroundings: from 1780 onwards as a pastor, from 1781 as a teacher in the local high school, and from 1783 as a cathedral preacher in the Minster of Ulm. In 1804 he became a consistorial councillor, in 1809 a district deacon, and in 1810 a spiritual councillor and deacon for Ulm.

Miller joined Freemasonry on 13 October 1774 at the Zum goldenen Zirkel lodge in Göttingen. On 11 December 1776 he was elected a fellow-craft. In 1775 he helped found the Zur goldenen Kugel lodge in Hamburg. For a long time he was speaker at the Asträa zu den 3 Ulmen lodge in Ulm (which was shut during the period 1795-1807).

On 21 June 1814, Johann Martin Miller died at the age of sixty-four in Ulm. A short autobiographical essay, written by Miller in 1793 and published in a widely read periodical, is one of the main sources of his life.

His collected poems appeared in 2016 (the 200th anniversary of his death) with Elfenbein Verlag in Berlin - for the first time in 1783.

== Works ==
- Beytrag zur Geschichte der Zärtlichkeit. Aus den Briefen zweier Liebenden ("Towards a History of Tenderness. From the Letters of Two Lovers," 1776, reprinted with appendix in 1780)
- Siegwart. Eine Klostergeschichte ("Siegwart, a Monastic Tale", 1776) (facsimile scan at Deutsches Textarchiv)
- Briefwechsel dreyer akademischer Freunde ("Correspondence of Three friends at the Academy", 1776)
- Geschichte Karls von Burgheim und Emiliens von Rosenau ("Tale of Karl von Burgheim and Emilie von Rosenau", 1778)
- Johann Martin Millers Gedichte ("Johann Martin Miller's Poems", 1783)
- Karl und Karoline ("Carl and Caroline") (1783)
- Briefwechsel zwischen einem Vater und seinem Sohn auf der Akademie ("Correspondence of a Father and a Son on the Academy", 1785)
- Die Geschichte Gottfried Walthers, eines Tischlers, und des Städtleins Erlenburg ("The Story of Gottfried Walther, a Joiner, and the Little Town of Erlenburg", 1786)

== Available Editions ==
- Liederton und Triller. Sämtliche Gedichte, ed., commentary and postface by Michael Watzka. Berlin: Elfenbein Verlag, 2014, ISBN 978-3-941184-30-5.

== Sources ==
- Bernd Breitenbuch: Johann Martin Miller 1750-1814. Liederdichter des Göttinger Hain, Romancier, Prediger am Ulmer Münster. Ausstellung zum 250. Geburtstag. Stadtbibliothek Ulm, Schwörhaus, 3. Dezember 2000 bis 27. Januar 2001. Weißenhorn: Konrad 2000. (= Veröffentlichungen der Stadtbibliothek Ulm; 20) ISBN 3-87437-448-3
- Bernd Breitenbruch: "Johann Martin Millers Romane und ihre Nachdrucke. Mit Beiträgen zu den Reutlinger und Tübinger Nachdrucken", in: Jahrbuch des Freien Deutschen Hochstifts 2013. Göttingen/Tübingen, 2014, pp. 83–145.
- Adalbert Elschenbroich (1994). "Miller, Johann Martin". Neue Deutsche Biographie (in German). Vol. 17. Berlin: Duncker & Humblot. pp. 514–516. (full text online).
- Alain Faure: Johann Martin Miller, romancier sentimental. Paris: Champion 1977.
- Hans-Edwin Friedrich: "Autonomie der Liebe - Autonomie des Romans. Zur Funktion von Liebe im Roman der 1770er Jahre: Goethes Werther und Millers Siegwart" (30. Juli 2004), in: [Goethezeitportal.http://www.goethezeitportal.de/db/wiss/epoche/friedrich_liebe.pdf]
- Heinrich Kraeger: Johann Martin Miller. Ein Beitrag zur Geschichte der Empfindsamkeit. Bremen: Heinsius 1893.
- Erich Schmidt: Miller, Johann Martin, in: Allgemeine Deutsche Biographie (ADB). Band 21, Duncker & Humblot, Leipzig 1885, pp. 750–755.
- Frank Raberg: Biografisches Lexikon für Ulm und Neu-Ulm 1802–2009. Süddeutsche Verlagsgesellschaft Ulm im Jan Thorbecke Verlag, Ostfildern 2010, ISBN 978-3-7995-8040-3, pp. 275 f.
- Reinhart Schönsee: J. M. Millers Prosaschriften als Krisenphänomen ihrer Epoche. Hamburg: Univ. Diss. 1972.
- Manfred von Stosch (Hg.): Der Briefwechsel zwischen Johann Martin Miller und Johann Heinrich Voss. Berlin: De Gruyter 2012. ISBN 3-11-023417-3 (correspondence with J. H. Voss)
- Heinz Strauss: Der Klosterroman von Millers 'Siegwart' bis zu seiner künstlerischen Höhe bei E. T. A. Hoffmann. Ein Beitrag zur Literaturgeschichte des 12. Jahrhunderts. München: Univ. Diss. 1922.
- Michael Watzka: "Ein One-Hit-Wonder? Die Lyrik Johann Martin Millers in den Kompositionen seiner Zeitgenossen", in: Lenz-Jahrbuch 21, 2014, S. 111–146. ISBN 978-3-86110-575-6 / ISSN 0940-7499.
