= Johann Christian Dieterich =

German publisher

Johann Christian Dieterich (1722–1800) was the founder of the Dieterich’sche Verlagsbuchhandlung publishing house and a close friend of Georg Christoph Lichtenberg. He published the first Musen-Almanach.

== Early years ==
Dieterich was born in Stendal. He began his career as proprietor of a silk shop in Berlin, which he moved to Gotha. In 1749 he married the daughter of the bookseller Mevius and began running his shop for him.

== Career ==
In 1760 he started a new bookshop in Göttingen, printed a few books, and in 1770 established a publishing house. Among the most famous authors whose works he published are Gottfried August Bürger and Georg Christoph Lichtenberg. He was a close friend of the latter, and between 1776 and his death in 1799, Lichtenberg lived in the Dieterich family's house. On his travels he wrote many long letters to the Dieterichs.

== Death ==
Dieterich died in Göttingen. His son Heinrich (1761-1837) continued running the business himself until 1824.

== Works published by Dieterich's company before 1850 ==
- Almanach de Gotha or Gothaischer genealogischer Kalender, Göttingen 1763. The German equivalent of Burke's Peerage, it was taken up by a different publisher (C. W. Ettinger) in 1775, then by Justus Perthes in 1815, and was published continuously until 1944. From 1951 a different company continued it as Genealogisches Handbuch des Adels (GHdA).
- Systema vegetabilium, by Carl Linnaeus in 1784.
- Göttinger Taschen Calender, which contained, from 1784 to 1796, Lichtenberg's commentaries on the work of William Hogarth. These were republished between 1794 and 1799.
- Jacob Grimm's Deutsche Grammatik, Weisthümern, and others
- Works by Friedrich Christoph Dahlmann, Gottfried Müller, Heinrich Albert Zachariä, Konrad Johann Martin Langenbeck, Carl Friedrich Gauss, Georg Friedrich Benecke, Ernst Ludwig von Leutsch and Friedrich Wilhelm Schneidewin

== Bibliography ==
- Elisabeth Willnat: Johann Christian Dieterich. ein Verlagsbuchhändler und Drucker in der Zeit der Aufklärung. Buchhändler-Vereinigung, Frankfurt am Main 1993. ISBN 3-7657-1745-2 (Dissertation)
- Johann Christian Dieterich, Ludwig Christian Lichtenberg, Ulrich Joost (eds): Der Briefwechsel zwischen Johann Christian Dieterich und Ludwig Christian Lichtenberg. Vandehoek und Rupprecht, Göttingen 1997 ISBN 3-525-82429-7
- Gottfried August Bürger, Ulrich Joost (eds): Mein scharmantes Geldmännchen: Gottfried August Bürgers Briefwechsel mit seinem Verleger Dieterich. Wallstein, Göttingen 1988 ISBN 3-89244-002-6
- Eduard Grisebach (ed): G. C. Lichtenberg's Briefe an Dieterich 1770–1798. Dieterich'sche Verlagsanstalt Leipzig 1898.
