= Landfoged =

Civil servant to the Danish king

A Landfoged (Icelandic: landfógeti; Danish: landfoged; Faroese: (land)fúti) was a civil servant who saw to the finances of the Danish king in islands such as Iceland and the Faroe Islands, collecting revenue for the whole country. The usual English translation is 'sheriff'.

== Iceland ==
In Iceland, he was treasurer of the jarðarbókarsjóð, and had to control the property of the king in Iceland, taxes and other payments, and manage fisheries of the king at Suðurnes. The Landfógeti collected taxes in Gullbringusýsla and was police chief in Reykjavík. He had to make sure the trade legislation would be obeyed.

These are Iceland's Landfógetar:

- Kristofer Heidemann (1683–1693)
- Andrés Iversen (1693–1695)
- Jens Jörgensen (1695–1702)
- Páll Pétursson Beyer (1702–1717)
- Kornelíus Wulf (1717–1727)
- Kristján Luxdorf (1727–1739)
- Kristján Drese (1739–1749)
- Guðni Sigurðsson (1749)
- Skúli Magnússon (1749–1793)
- Jón Skúlason (deputy landfógeti) (1763–1786)
- Hans Jakob Líndal (1786–1787)
- Magnús Stephensen (1793–1794)
- Paul M. Finne (1794–1804)
- Rasmus Frydensberg (1804–1813)
- Sigurður Thorgrímsen (1813–1828)
- Christian Ulstrup (1828–1836)
- Ólafur H. Finsen (1831–1832)
- Þórður Sveinbjörnsson (1835–1836)
- Stefán Gunnlaugsson (1836)
- Morten Hansen Tvede (1836–1838)
- Stefán Gunnlaugsson (1838–1849)
- Kristján Kristjánsson (1849–1851)
- Jón Pétursson (1851–1852)
- Vilhjálmur Finsen (1852–1860)
- Hermanníus E. Johnson (1859–1861)
- Árni Thorsteinson (1861–1904)

== Faroe Islands ==
In the Faroes today, the Føroya Landfúti is the name of the Faroese Police, and the head of the police. Previously, he received the taxes from the sysselmand and delivered the proceeds to the stiftamtmand of the Faroe Islands.

== Danish West Indies ==
=== Saint John ===
- () Hans Wilhelm Koch
- () Ditlev Nicolay Friis
- (-1774) Carl Frederich Weyle
- (1787-1819) Sophus Emil Zielian

== Schleswig-Holstein ==
=== North Dithmarschen ===
- (-1585) Marcus Swin
- (1671 - ) Heinrich Christian Boie
- () Christian Mathias Jakob Johannsen

=== South Dithmarschen ===
- () Peter Bogislaus Carstens
- (1806-) Johan Christian Friedrich Heinzelmann

=== Sild ===
- () Johann Friedrich Jensen
- (1830 - ) Uwe Jens Lornsen

== Ærø ==
A landfoged office on Ærø was introduced in 1773.

- (1773-1774) Johann Heinrich Prehn
- (5 March 1784 - ?) Johann Georg Tilemann
- Peter Bogislaus Carstens
