= Gottfried August Bürger =

German poet (1747–1794)

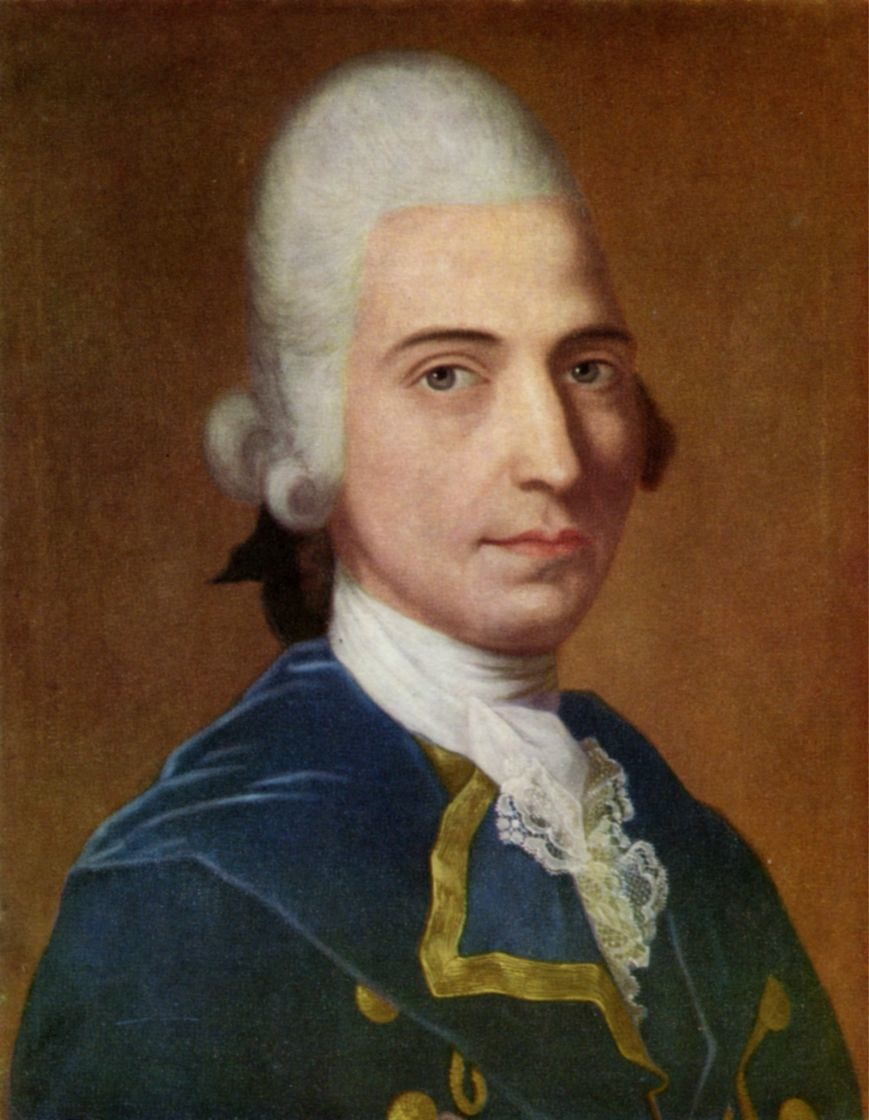
- Portrait by Johann Heinrich Tischbein the Younger, 1771
- Born: Gottfried August Bürger; 31 December 1747; Molmerswende, near Halberstadt, Anhalt
- Died: 8 June 1794 (aged 46); Göttingen

Gottfried August Bürger (31 December 1747 – 8 June 1794) was a German poet. His most notable ballad, Lenore, found an audience beyond readers of the German language in an English and Russian adaptation and a French translation.

== Biography ==
Bürger was born in Molmerswende (now a part of Mansfeld), Principality of Halberstadt, where his father was the Lutheran pastor. He showed an early predilection for solitary and gloomy places and the making of verses, for which he had no other model than hymnals. At the age of twelve, he was adopted by his maternal grandfather, Bauer, at Aschersleben, who sent him to the Pädagogium at Halle. He learned Latin with difficulty. In 1764, he gained admission into the University of Halle as a student of theology, which, however, he soon abandoned for the study of jurisprudence. There he fell under the influence of Christian Adolph Klotz (1738–1771), who directed Bürger's attention to literature. In consequence of his dissipated habits, in 1767 he was recalled by his grandfather, but on promising to reform, was allowed to enter the University of Göttingen as a law student in 1768.

As he continued his turbulent career, however, his grandfather withdrew his support and he was left to his own. Meanwhile, he had made fair progress with his legal studies, and formed a close friendship with a number of young men of literary tastes. He studied ancient classics and notable works in French, Italian, Spanish and English, particularly Shakespeare, and the old English and Scottish ballads. Thomas Percy's Reliques of Ancient English Poetry, which Bürger translated into German, was his constant companion. In the Göttingen Musenalmanach, edited by Heinrich Christian Boie and Friedrich Wilhelm Gotter, Bürger's first poems were published, and by 1771 he had already become widely known as a poet. In 1772, through Boie's influence, Bürger obtained the post of Amtmann or district magistrate at Altengleichen near Göttingen. His grandfather reconciled with him, paid his debts and established him in his new sphere of activity.

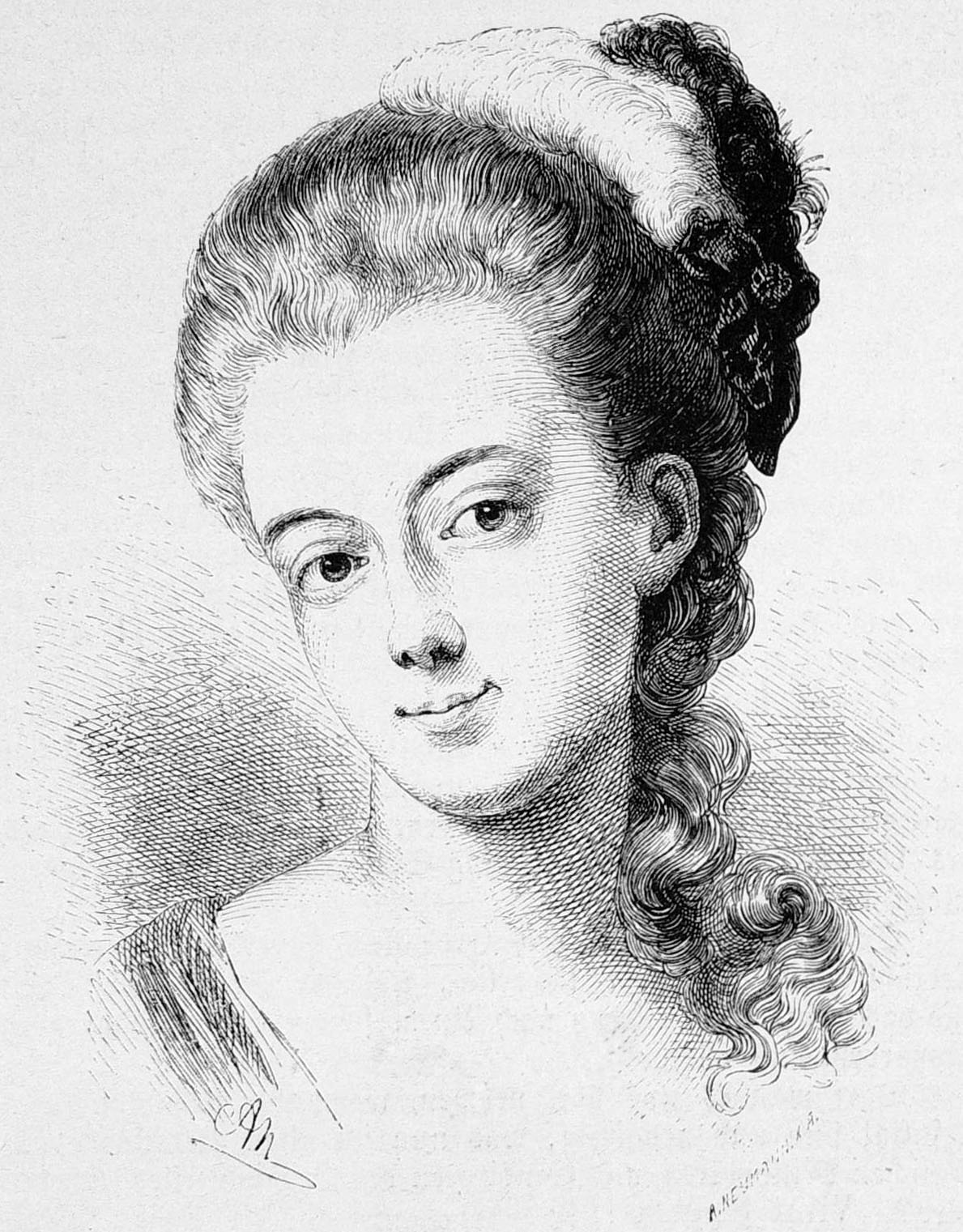
Auguste Leonhart, sister of Bürger's wife, and the "Molly" of his poetry. After an autoportrait pastel drawing in 1781.

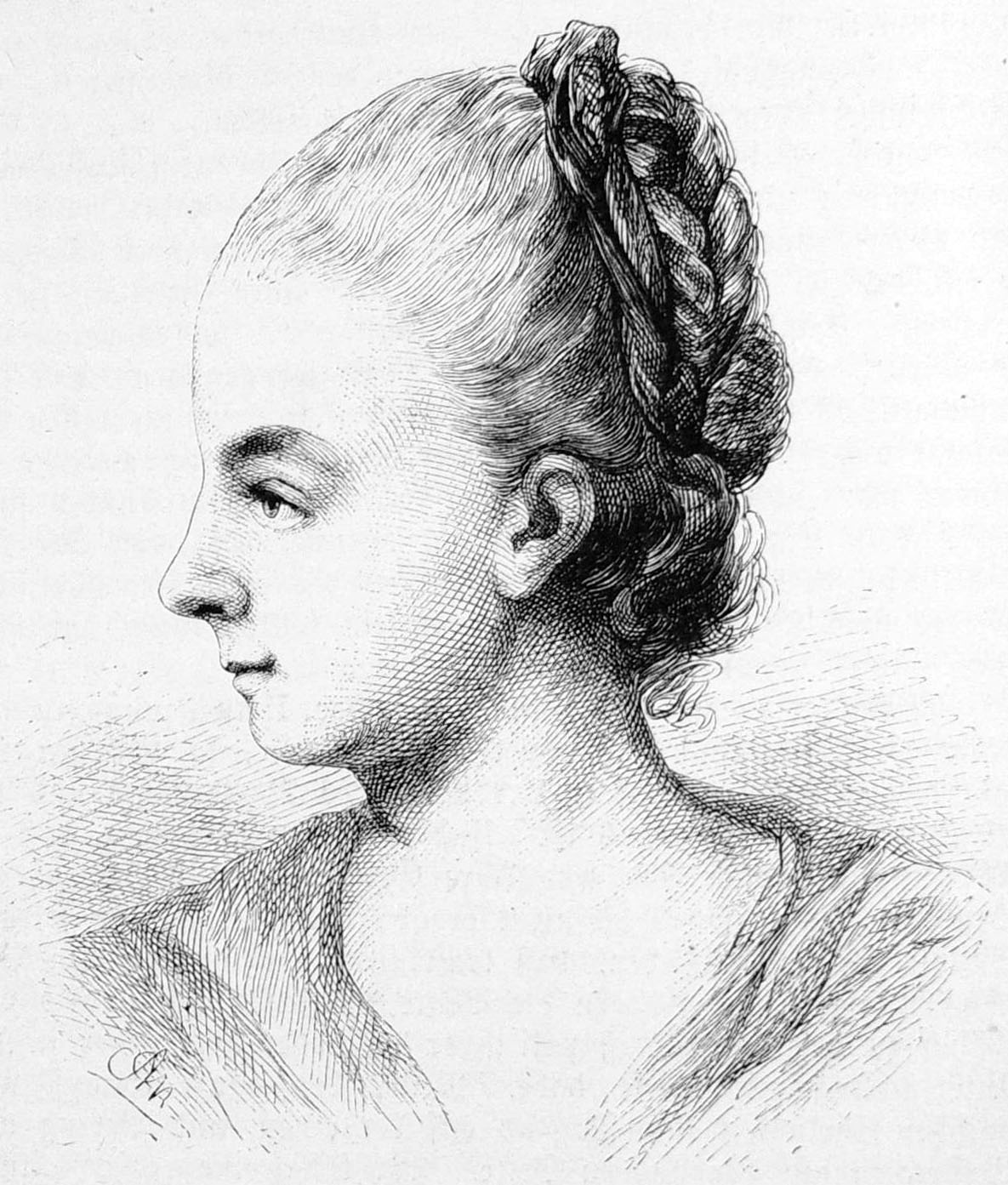
Dorette Bürger, after a pastel drawing by her sister Auguste in 1781.

Meanwhile, he kept in touch with his Göttingen friends, and when the Göttinger Bund or "Hain" ("Göttinger Hainbund") was formed, Bürger, though not himself a member, kept in close touch with it. In 1773, the ballad Lenore was published in the Musenalmanach. This poem made him famous in Göttingen. Lenore was paraphrased by Walter Scott under the title William and Helen and Goethe did the same under the title Bride of Corinth. In 1774 he married Dorette Leonhart, the daughter of a Hanoverian official; but his passion for his wife's younger sister Auguste (the "Molly" of his poems and elegies) rendered the union unhappy and unsettled his life. In 1778, Bürger became editor of the Musenalmanach, a position he retained until his death. In the same year, he published the first collection of his poems. In 1780 he took a farm at Appenrode, but in three years lost so much money that he abandoned the venture. After being accused of neglecting his official duties, he gave up his official position and moved to Göttingen in 1784, where he established himself as a privatdozent.

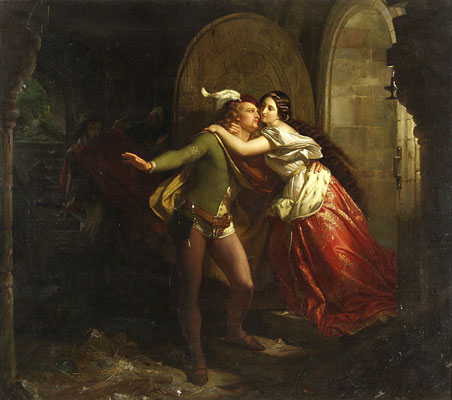
Lenardo und Blandine, after Bürger's poem, by Wilhelm Volkhart

Shortly before his move, his wife died on 30 July 1784, and on 29 June the next year he married his sister-in-law "Molly." Her death in childbirth on 9 January 1786 affected him deeply. He continued to teach in Göttingen; at the jubilee of the foundation of the university in 1787 he was made an honorary doctor of philosophy, and in 1789 was appointed extraordinary professor in that faculty, though without a stipend. He was obliged to gain his living by poorly rewarded translations for booksellers.

In 1790, he married Elise Hahn, a fan of his poetry. However, they divorced after two and a half years. Deeply wounded by Schiller's criticism, in the 14th and 15th part of the Allgemeine Literaturzeitung of 1791, of the second edition of his poems, disappointed, wrecked in fortune and health, Bürger worked as a teacher in Göttingen until he died from tuberculosis on 8 June 1794. The government of Hanover afforded him some assistance shortly before his death.

== Legacy ==
Bürger's talent for popular poetry was very considerable, and his ballads are considered among the finest in the German language. Besides Lenore, other notable works include Das Lied vom braven Manne, Die Kuh, Der Kaiser und der Abt and Der wilde Jäger. Among his purely lyrical poems, but few have earned a lasting reputation; but mention may be made of Das Blümchen Wunderhold, Lied an den lieben Mond, and a few love songs. His sonnets, particularly the elegies, are of great beauty. Bürger revived the sonnet form in German, and his experiments in it were praised as models by Schiller, despite his severe criticism of some of Bürger's more popular poems.

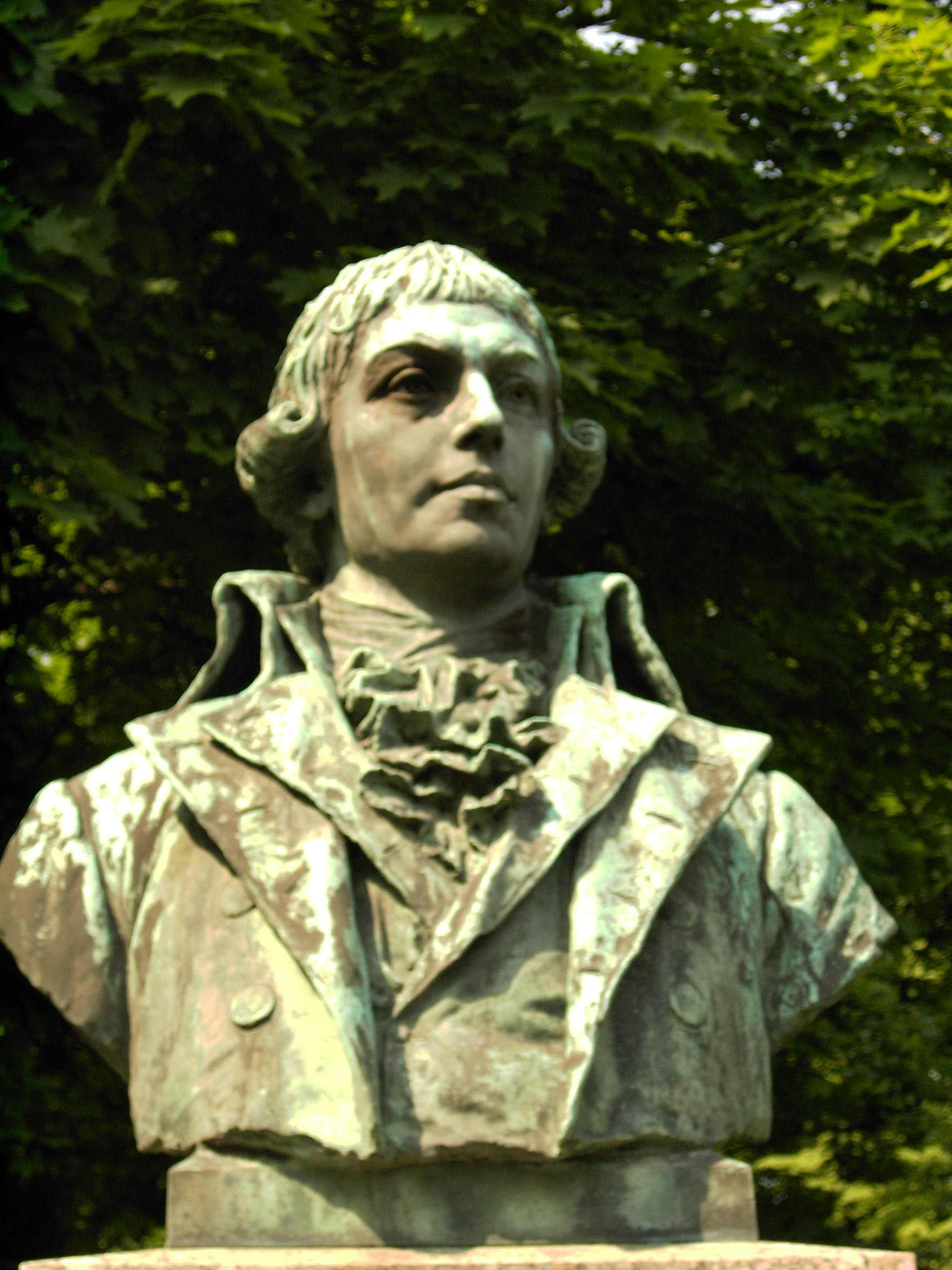
Bust at the Gottfried-August-Bürger-Denkmal in Göttingen from 1895

== Editions ==
Editions of Bürger's Sämtliche Schriften appeared at Göttingen, 1817 (incomplete); 1829–1833 (8 vols.), and 1835 (one vol.); also a selection by Eduard Grisebach (5th ed, 1894). The Gedichte have been published in innumerable editions, the best being that by August Sauer (2 vols., 1884). Briefe von und an Bürger were edited by Adolf Strodtmann in 4 vols. (1874). Bürger was introduced to English readers in William and Helen (1775), Walter Scott's version of Lenore. The elder Dumas translated Lenore into French.

Bürger is known for German translations of Baron Munchausen's Narrative of His Marvellous Travels and Campaigns in Russia by Rudolf Erich Raspe (1786, after the release of the 4th English edition; 2nd expanded ed. 1788, after the release of the 5th expanded English edition). In his introduction to the 1788 German edition, Bürger admitted to adapting and elaborating the original English-language works, and, despite his clear notice that he was doing a translation, for some time Bürger was believed to be the author of the tales. Raspe had originally concealed his authorship.

== See also ==
- Baron Munchausen
- Rudolf Erich Raspe
- Le Chasseur maudit (Franck)
