= Baron Munchausen's Narrative of His Marvellous Travels and Campaigns in Russia =

1785 novel by Rudolf Erich Raspe

Baron Munchausen's Narrative of his Marvellous Travels and Campaigns in Russia
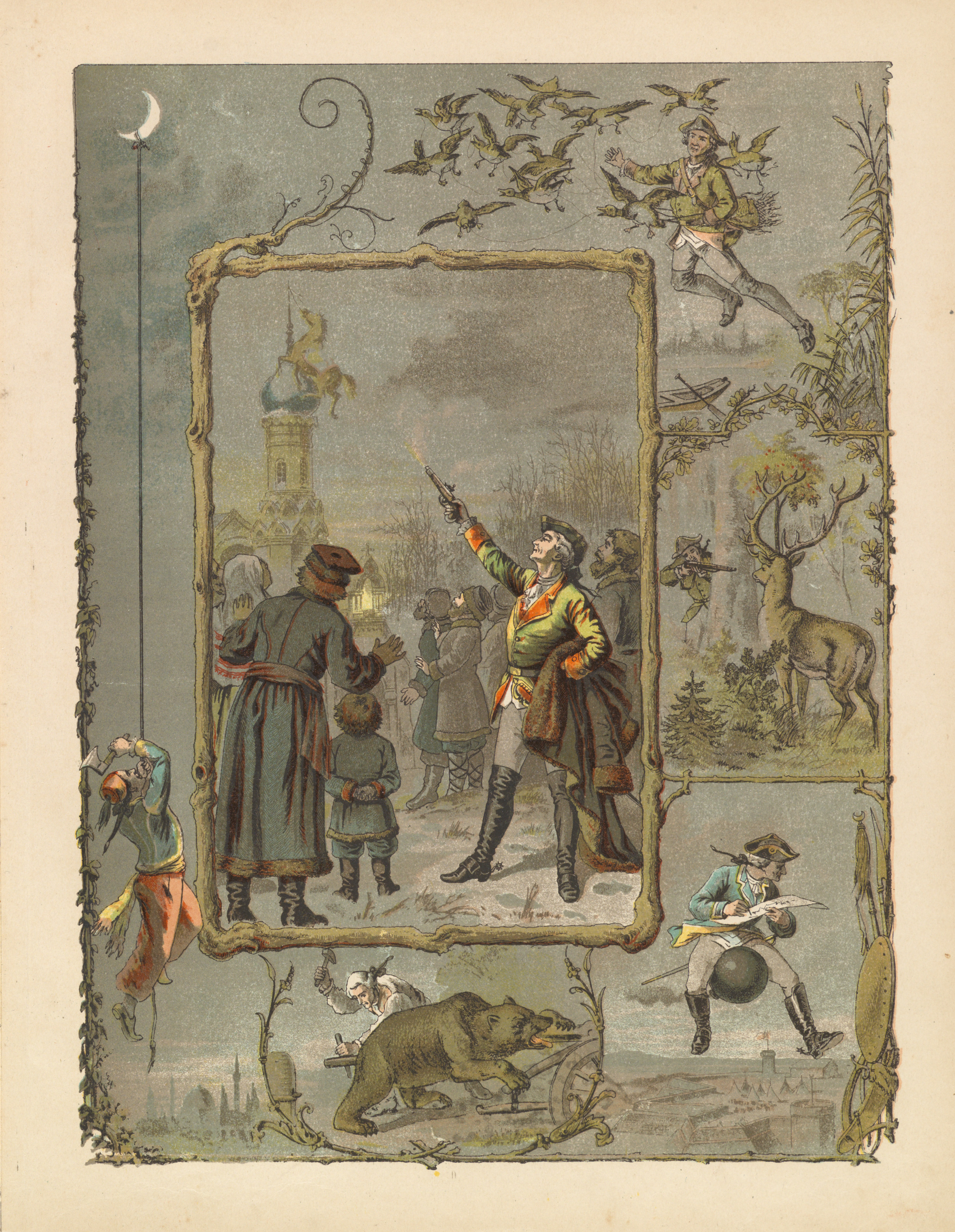
- Baron Munchausen in the 1890 Dutch translation
- Author: Rudolf Erich Raspe
- Language: English
- Genre: Fiction, fantasy
- Publication date: 1785
- Publication place: England

Baron Munchausen's Narrative of His Marvellous Travels and Campaigns in Russia is a 1785 novel about a fictional German nobleman written by the German writer Rudolf Erich Raspe.

The lead character Baron Munchausen is loosely based on a real baron, Hieronymus Karl Friedrich, Freiherr von Münchhausen (1720–1797, German pronunciation: [ˈmʏnç(h)aʊzən]). The fictionalized character was created by Rudolf Erich Raspe.

The novel was the basis of the 1943 film Münchhausen, the 1962 film The Fabulous Baron Munchausen and the 1988 film The Adventures of Baron Munchausen.

== Premise ==
An eighteenth-century German nobleman Baron Munchausen, experiences a series of amazing adventures. He arrives at the Turkish royal court, where he meets the Sultan, steals his whole treasury, and sails away from Turkey.
