= Ludwig Christoph Heinrich Hölty =

German poet (1748–1776)

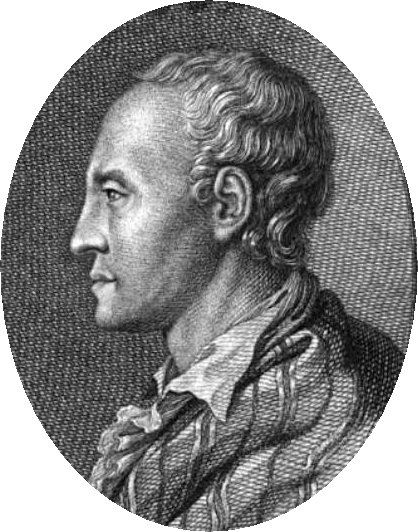
Ludwig Hölty

Ludwig Christoph Heinrich Hölty (21 December 1748 – 1 September 1776) was a German poet, known especially for his ballads.

Hölty was born in the Electorate of Hanover in the village of Mariensee (today part of Neustadt am Rübenberge) where his father was pastor. In 1769, he went to study theology at the University of Göttingen. There he formed a close friendship with Johann Martin Miller, Johann Heinrich Voss, Heinrich Christian Boie, the brothers Stolberg, and others, and became one of the founders of the famous society of young poets known as the Hain, or Göttinger Hainbund. By the time he left the university in 1774, he had abandoned all intention of becoming a clergyman, but he was not to enter any profession. He died of consumption at Hanover.

Hölty was the most gifted lyric poet of the Göttingen circle. He was influenced by Johann Uz and Friedrich Klopstock, but his love for the Volkslied and his delight in nature preserved him from the artificiality of Uz and the unworldliness of Klopstock. A strain of melancholy runs through all his lyrics. His ballads are the pioneers of the rich ballad literature on English models, which sprang up in Germany over the next few years. Among his most familiar poems are: "Üb' immer Treu' und Redlichkeit" (1776), "Tanzt dem schönen Mai entgegen", and "Wer wollte sich mit Grillen plagen" (1776).

To many, the opening lines of Hölty's poem "Der alte Landmann an seinen Sohn" ("The Old Farmer to His Son") are the very embodiment of all Prussian virtues. This poem was set to music by Mozart to a melody adapted from the aria "Ein Mädchen oder Weibchen" from his 1791 opera The Magic Flute. It was played daily by the carillon of the Potsdam Garrison Church where Frederick the Great was initially buried. The text reads as follows: "Üb' immer Treu und Redlichkeit / Bis an dein kühles Grab; / Und weiche keinen Fingerbreit / Von Gottes Wegen ab." Translation: "Practice always fidelity and honesty / Up to your cold grave; / And stray not one inch / From the ways of the Lord."

Hölty's collection Gedichte (poems) was published by his friends Count Friedrich Leopold zu Stolberg and J. H. Voss (Hamburg, 1783). A new edition, enlarged by Voss with a biography, came out in 1804, followed by a more complete but still imperfect edition by F. Voigts (Hanover, 1857). The first complete edition was that of Karl Halm (Leipzig, 1870), who had access to manuscripts not hitherto known.

Many of Hölty's poems were set to music by composers including Mozart, Beethoven, Schubert, Mendelssohn, Fanny Hensel, and Brahms, and his verse 'Ihr Freunde, hänget, wann ich gestorben bin' is inscribed above the final movement of the Harp Sonata by Paul Hindemith. Several streets and schools in Germany are named after him, including the Hölty-Gymnasium in Wunstorf near Hanover; in 2008, the biennial poetry prize Hölty-Preis was created in his name.
