= Molmerswende =

- Stadtteil of Mansfeld
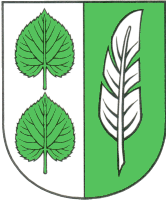
- Coat of arms
- Interactive map of Molmerswende
- Location within Germany Location within Saxony-Anhalt
- Coordinates: 51°37′38″N 11°15′40″E
- Country: Germany
- State: Saxony-Anhalt
- District: Mansfeld-Südharz
- Town: Mansfeld

Area
  - Total: 4.06 km^{2} (1.57 sq mi)
- Elevation: 330 m (1,080 ft)

Population (2006-12-31)
  - Total: 256
  - Density: 63.1/km^{2} (163/sq mi)
- Time zone: UTC+01:00 (CET)
  - Summer (DST): UTC+02:00 (CEST)
- Postal codes: 06543
- Dialling codes: 034779
- Vehicle registration: MSH

Molmerswende is a village and a former municipality in the Mansfeld-Südharz district, Saxony-Anhalt, Germany. Since 6 March 2009, it has been part of Mansfeld.
