= Johann Friedrich Hahn =

Johann Friedrich Hahn (28 December 1753 in Gießen – 30 May 1779 in Zweibrücken) was a German lyric poet.

Hahn, an evangelical Lutheran, began his studies on 22 April 1771 at the University of Göttingen, first law, then theology. On 12 September 1772 he helped to establish the Göttinger Hainbund literary group.

After his graduation he became a confidant of Johann Heinrich Voss.

On 11 May 1774, along with Friedrich Leopold Graf zu Stolberg, he became a Freemason in the Zu den drei Rosen lodge of Hamburg. In June 1774 he helped found the Zum goldenen Zirkel lodge in Göttingen, and on 18 November 1774 he was elected Master.

He was a close friend of the German-Swedish composer Joseph Martin Kraus (1756-1792).

He died on 30 May 1779 at the age of twenty-five.

== External sources ==
Olga Kawecka, Joseph Martin Kraus and Johann Friedrich Hahn: The Composer and the Poet

== Works ==
- Gedichte und Briefe ("Poems and letters", 1880)
