= Gottfried Müller (jurist) =

Jurist in the Austrian Empire (1796–1881)

Johannes Gottfried Müller (28 December 1796–4 March 1881) was a jurist in the Austrian Empire.

He was born in Broos, Transylvania.

In 1844 he joined a newly founded law academy in Sibiu, where he served as director for over a quarter of a century. The institute was closed in 1884 by Ágoston Trefort, the Hungarian education minister, during the Magyarization.

He was awarded the title Imperial Councillor in 1860, and the Knight's Cross of the Order of Franz Joseph in 1862. After retirement, he was forced into exile. He died in 1881 in Währing near Vienna.
