= Johann Heinrich Voss =

German classicist, poet, translator (1751–1826)

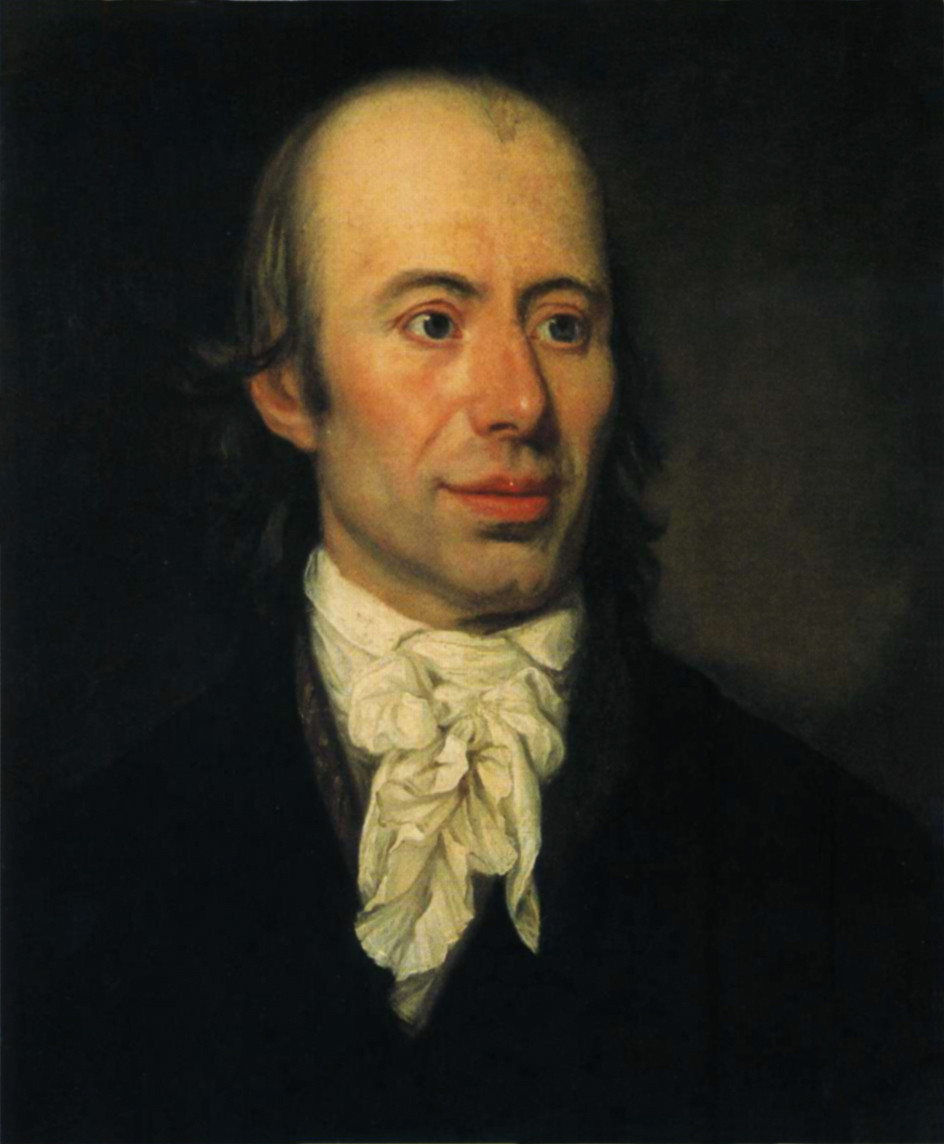
Johann Heinrich Voss, 1797

Johann Heinrich Voss (German: Voß, pronounced [fɔs]; 20 February 1751 – 29 March 1826) was a German classicist and poet, known mostly for his translation of Homer's Odyssey (1781) and Iliad (1793) into German.

== Life ==
Voss was born at Sommersdorf in Mecklenburg-Strelitz as the son of a farmer. After attending the Gymnasium at Neubrandenburg from 1766 to 1769, he was obliged to accept a private tutorship in order to earn money to enable him to study at a university.

At the invitation of Heinrich Christian Boie, whose attention he had attracted by poems contributed to the Göttinger Musenalmanach, he went to the University of Göttingen in 1772. There he studied philology, his studies encompassing both classical and modern languages, and became one of the leading spirits in the Göttinger Hainbund. In 1775 Boie made over to him the editorship of the Musenalmanach, which he continued to issue for several years. He married Boie's sister Ernestine in 1777.

In 1778 Voss was appointed rector of the school at Otterndorf. In 1781, after the publication of several treatises, he produced a German-language text for Homer's Odyssey. This work made the poem national with the Germans (new ed. by Bernays, 1881).

In 1782, Voss accepted the rectorship of the gymnasium at Eutin. There, in 1789, he published translations of Virgil's Eclogues and Georgics. In 1793, his translation of Homer's Iliad appeared, along with the Odyssey in a new form. He also produced two volumes of controversial letters addressed to Christian Gottlob Heyne (Mythologische Briefe, 1794).

He retired from Eutin in 1802 with a pension of 600 thalers, and settled at Jena. In 1805, although Johann Wolfgang von Goethe used his utmost endeavours to persuade him to stay, Voss accepted a call to a professorship of classical literature at the University of Heidelberg. There, in the enjoyment of a considerable salary, he devoted himself entirely to his literary labours, translations and antiquarian research until his death.

== Work ==
=== Poetry and essays ===
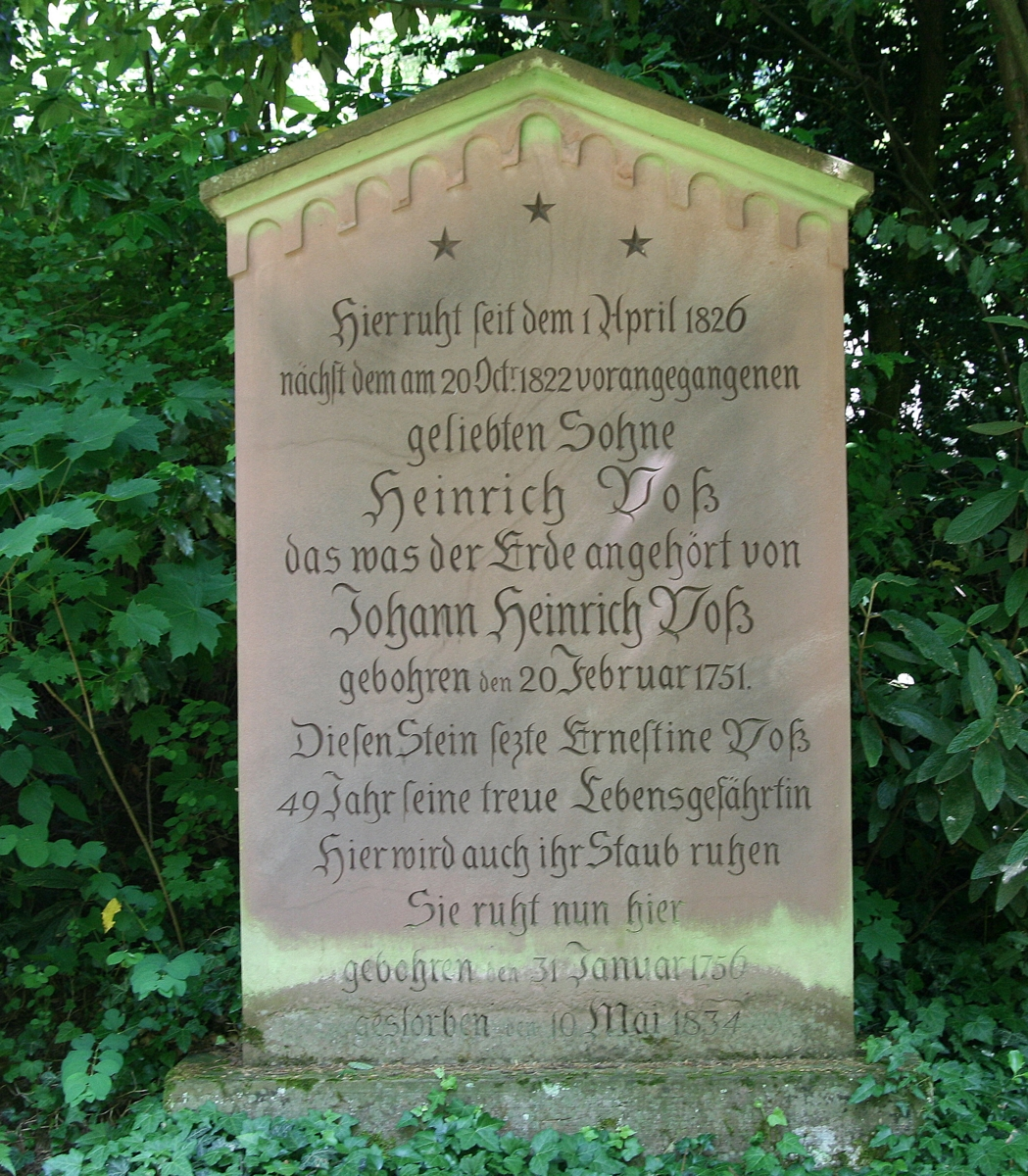
Voss' grave in Heidelberg

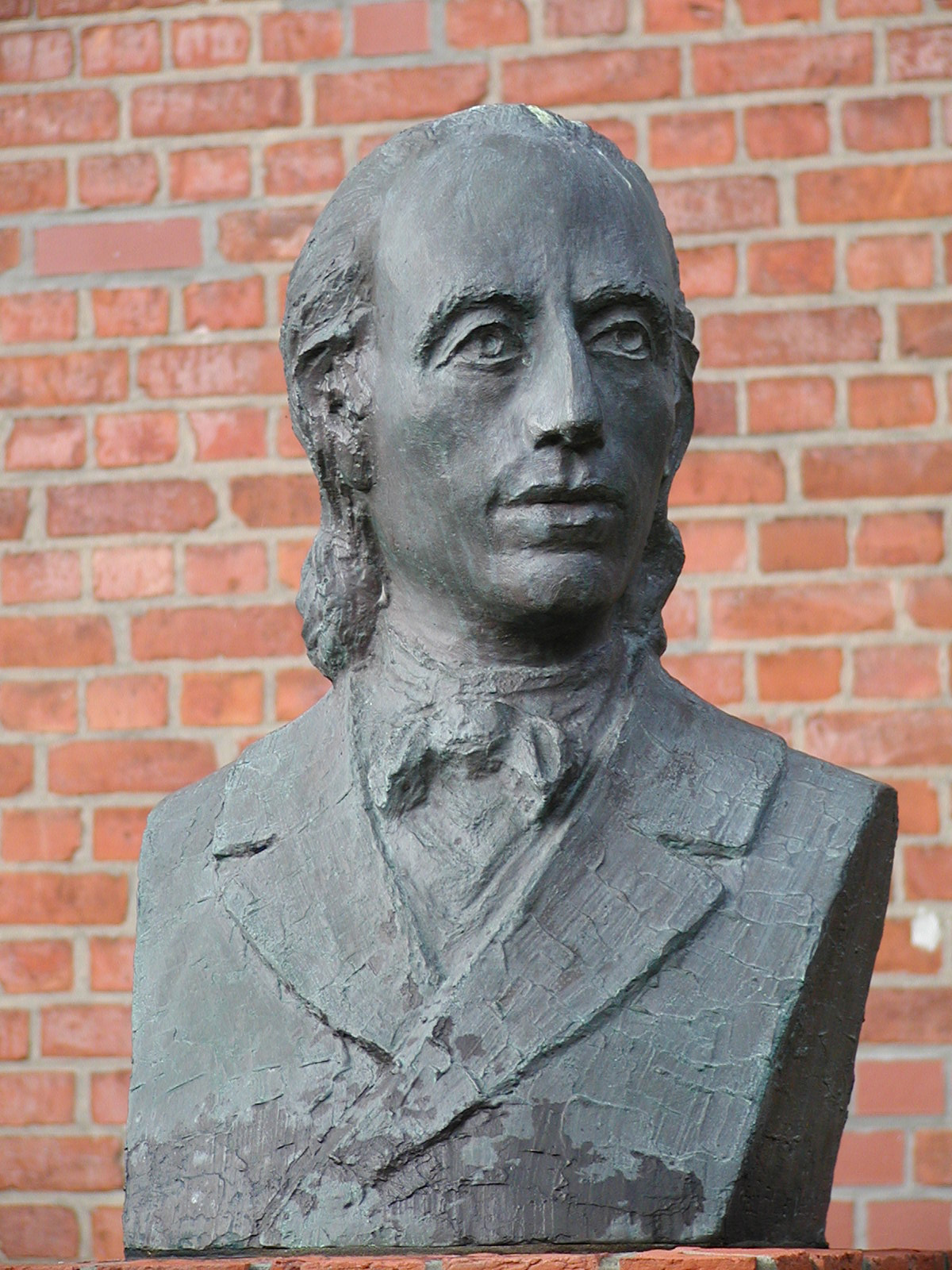
Bust of Johann Heinrich Voss in Otterndorf

Voss was a man of a remarkably independent and vigorous character. From 1785 to 1795 he published in two volumes a collection of original poems, to which he afterwards made many additions. An edition of his poems in four volumes was issued in 1825. Of these original works, the idyllic poem "Luise" is uniformly singled out as his most successful. It was first printed in 1783, and reissued with changes in 1795. In this work, he sought to apply the style and methods of classical poetry to the expression of modern German thought and sentiment. The later works Wie ward Fritz Stolberg ein Unfreier (1819) and Antisymbolik (2 volumes, 1824–1826), the latter written in opposition to Georg Friedrich Creuzer, have been characterized as painstaking and dignified, but dreary.

His poems were often set by contemporary composers such as C. P. E. Bach, Johann Friedrich Reichardt, and Johann Abraham Peter Schulz, and also later composers such as Felix Mendelssohn, Carl Maria von Weber, and Johannes Brahms. Many of his poems and settings of them were published in the Musenalmanach. Based on his correspondence with Schulz, he favored a folklike style of Lied composition.

Voss's Mythologische Briefe, his Antisymbolik, and other writings made important contributions to the study of mythology. He was also prominent as an advocate of the right of free judgment in religion, and at the time when some members of the Romantic school were being converted to the Roman Catholic Church, he produced a strong impression by a powerful article, in Heinrich Paulus's journal Sophronizon, on his friend Friedrich von Stolberg's repudiation of Protestantism (1819).

=== Translations ===
It is, however, as a translator that Voss chiefly owes his place in German literature. His translations indicate not only sound scholarship but a thorough mastery of the laws of German diction and rhythm. The most famous of his translations are those of Homer. The translation of the Odyssey, as originally issued in 1781, is singled out as the most successful. He also translated Hesiod (1806), Theocritus, Bion and Moschus (1808), the whole of Virgil (1799, rev. ed. 1821), Horace (1806), Tibullus (1810), Propertius (1830) and selections from Ovid (1798). He prepared a critical edition of Tibullus. From 1818 to 1829, a translation of William Shakespeare's plays in 9 volumes was published. This work Voss completed with the help of his sons Heinrich and Abraham, both of whom were scholars and writers of considerable ability, though the result has been characterized as less successful than Schlegel's work.

Voss's Sämtliche poetische Werke were published by his son Abraham in 1835; new ed. 1850. A selection is in A. Sauer, Der Göttinger Dichterbund, volume i. (Joseph Kürschner's Deutsche National-literatur, vol. 49, 1887). His Letters were published by his son in 3 or 4 volumes (Halberstadt, 1829–1833). Voss left a short autobiography, Abriß meines Lebens (1818). See also Wilhelm Herbst, Johann Heinrich Voß (3 volumes, Leipzig, 1872–1876); Friedrich Heussner, Johann Heinrich Voß als Schulmann in Eutin. Festschrift zum hundertjährigen Gedenktage seiner Ankunft daselbst (1882); and another life by Paulus (Heidelberg, 1826); also Robert Prutz, Der Göttinger Dichterbund (Leipzig, 1841).

According to Bartlett's Familiar Quotations, Voss is the most likely source for the phrase Wein, Weib und Gesang, or, in English, "wine, women and song". Voss's full phrase is Wer nicht liebt Wein, Weib und Gesang / Der bleibt ein Narr sein Lebelang ("He who loves not wine, woman and song / Remains a fool his whole life long").

== Notes ==
=== Sources ===
- Chisholm, Hugh, ed. (1911). "Voss, Johann Heinrich" . Encyclopædia Britannica. Vol. 28 (11th ed.). Cambridge University Press. p. 215.
