= Eichner =

Eichner is a surname. Notable people with the surname include:

- Adelheid Maria Eichner (1762–1787), German composer
- Alfred S. Eichner (1937–1988), American economist
- Billy Eichner (born 1978), American comedian and actor
- Clare Eichner (born 1969), American long-distance runner
- Christian Eichner (born 1982), German football player
- Ernst Eichner (1740-1777), German bassoonist and composer
- Florian Eichner (born 1985), German rower
- Henry M. Eichner (1909–1971), American non-fiction writer
- Ian Bruce Eichner (born 1945), American real estate developer
- Philip K. Eichner, American priest
- Sylvia Eichner (born 1957), German swimmer

== See also ==
- Phoenix Ikner (born 2004), American accused mass shooter
