= String Quartets, Op. 50 (Haydn) =

String quartets by Joseph Haydn

String Quartets, Opus 50 "Prussian"
- by Joseph Haydn
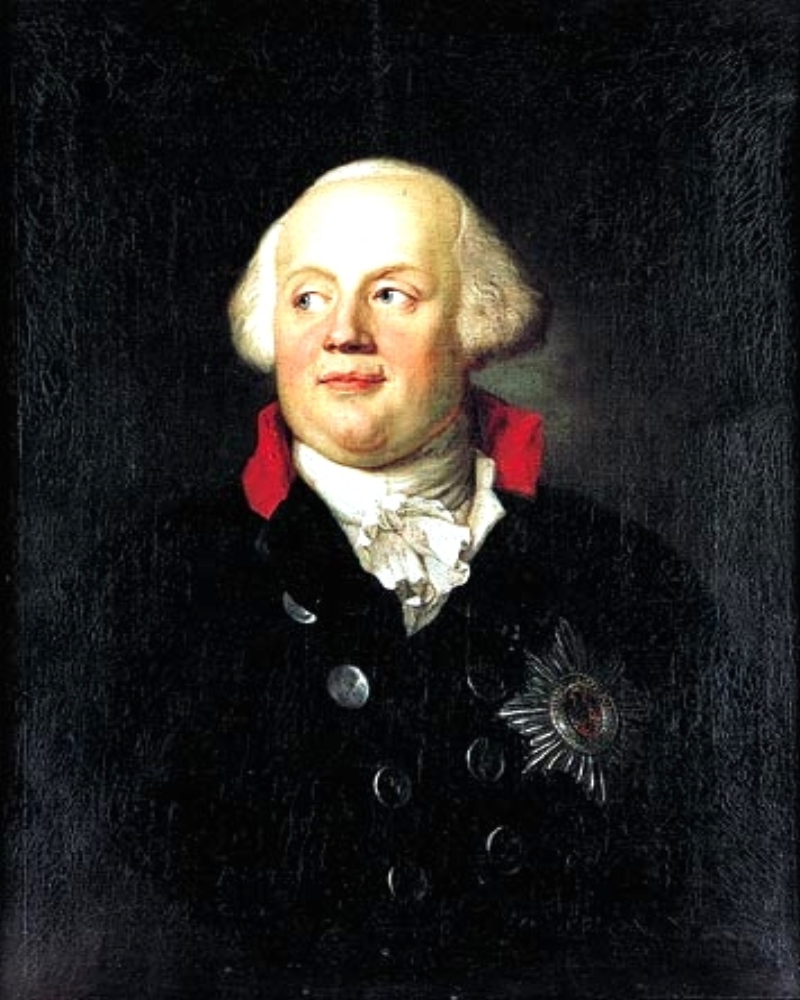
- The Opus 50 set was dedicated to King Frederick William II of Prussia (pictured), who was an amateur cellist.
- Catalogue: Hob. III/44–49; L. 36–41
- Opus: 50
- Style: Classical
- Composed: 1787
- Dedication: Frederick William II of Prussia
- Published: 1787
- Scoring: String quartet

The String Quartets, Op. 50 (Hob. III/44–49, L. 36–41), were composed by Joseph Haydn in 1787. The set of six quartets was dedicated to King Frederick William II of Prussia. For this reason the set is commonly known as the Prussian Quartets. Haydn sold the set to the Viennese firm Artaria and, without Artaria's knowledge, to the English publisher William Forster. Forster published it as Haydn's Opus 44. Haydn's autograph manuscripts for Nos. 3 to 6 of the set were discovered in Melbourne, Australia, in 1982.

Each of the six quartets in the set has four movements, and in each case the movements are ordered in a conventional fast–slow–minuet–fast sequence.

The set was Haydn's first complete set of quartets since the Opus 33 set of 1781. While the Opus 33 set was apt for broad public consumption, the Opus 50 set is more serious and experimental. It is perhaps because of the Opus 50's intellectual character that other sets among Haydn's mature quartets have received more attention from performers.

== History ==
Haydn conceived of what became the Opus 50 set in a letter to the publishing house Artaria in 1784, although he then put the project on hold for the Paris symphonies and The Seven Last Words of Christ. He started work in 1787, composing the first two quartets in February. In April, Haydn received a letter from King Frederick William II of Prussia, praising Haydn for the copies of the Paris symphonies that he had sent. The letter enclosed a golden ring. Haydn sought to return the favour by dedicating the Opus 50 set to the King, and Artaria acceded to Haydn's request to do so.

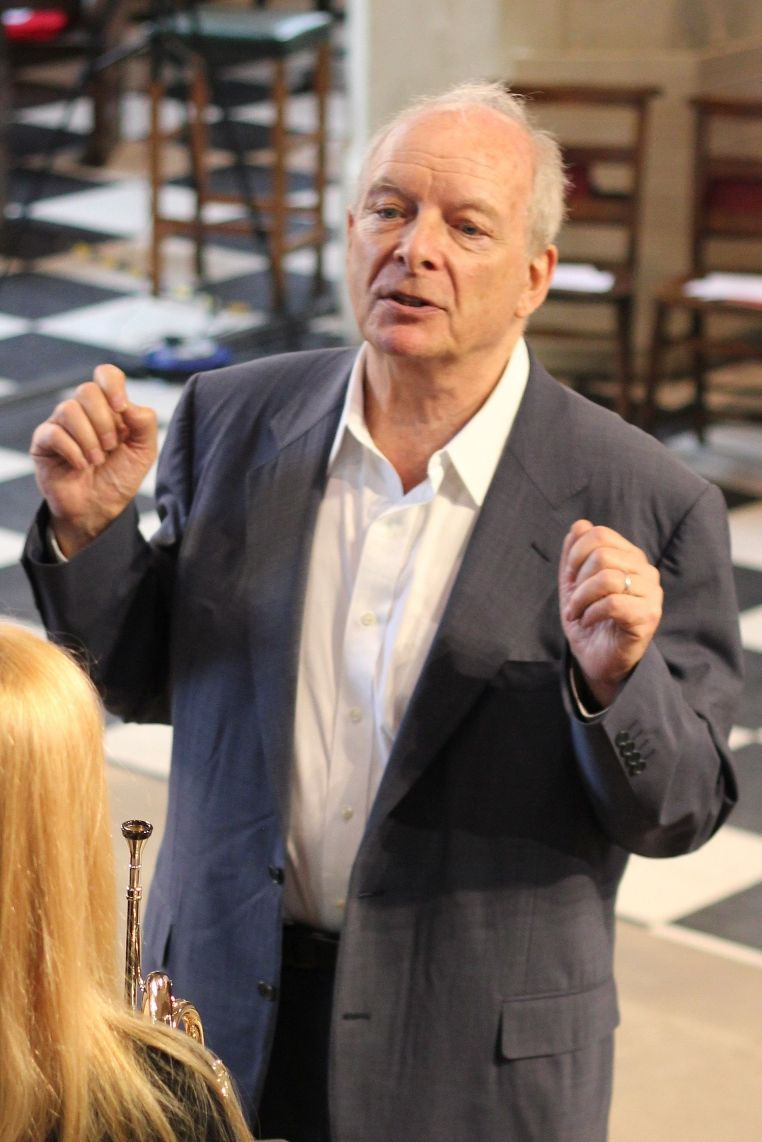
Christopher Hogwood in 2014

The history of the publication of Opus 50 set betrays one of the more remarkable examples of Haydn's financial and commercial impropriety. Haydn hurriedly completed the set by September 1787, when he sent the fifth quartet to Artaria. Meanwhile, in August, he had offered the set to the English publisher William Forster, who duly printed the six quartets before Artaria did. Haydn was deceiving both publishers: the offer to Forster was unbeknown to Artaria, while Haydn misled Forster into believing that no one else had been offered the set. Artaria learned of the Forster deal but published the set anyway, in December 1787, as Haydn's Opus 50.

In 1982, the original autograph manuscripts of the Nos. 3 to 6 of the set were discovered at a festival arranged in Melbourne, Australia, for the 250th anniversary of Haydn's birth. After a concert at the festival, a woman presented the manuscripts in a plastic shopping bag to the conductor Christopher Hogwood. The Haydn scholar Georg Feder, who was visiting Australia at the time, then verified the scores to be the authentic original manuscripts of the four quartets. It emerged that the woman who presented the manuscripts to Hogwood had inherited them, through successive generations, from an English colonel who had purchased them at an 1851 auction before emigrating to New Zealand. The colonel's heirs were evidently unaware that they owned the only original versions of the quartets in Haydn's pen. Until the 1982 discovery, publishers had been working from incomplete or non-original editions.

== Overview ==
The six quartets in the set are:

- Quartet No. 36 in B♭ major, Op. 50, No. 1, Hob. III/44
- Quartet No. 37 in C major, Op. 50, No. 2, Hob. III/45
- Quartet No. 38 in E♭ major, Op. 50, No. 3 Hob. III/46
- Quartet No. 39 in F♯ minor, Op. 50, No. 4, Hob. III/47
- Quartet No. 40 in F major ("Dream"), Op. 50, No. 5, Hob. III/48
- Quartet No. 41 in D major ("The Frog"), Op. 50, No. 6, Hob. III/49

In Haydn's previous two sets of quartets, the Opus 20 ("Sun") and Opus 33 ("Russian"), he adopted a variety of cyclical structures, particularly in the alternate placement of the slow movement as the second or third movement. But in the Opus 50 set, each quartet follows the same fast–slow–minuet–fast sequence. The set is also characterised by a high degree of monothematicism (the use of a single theme within a movement). In a number of movements, including sonata form movements and minuets and trios, Haydn eschews presenting a second and contrasting theme and instead elects to explore the full potential of the primary theme.

The set's dedicatee, King Frederick William II, was a capable amateur cellist. The set contains a number of striking passages for the cello, including in its opening of the first movement of No. 1 and its leading passages in the slow movements of Nos. 2 and 3.

== Opus 50, No. 1 ==
The first quartet of the set, in B♭ major, is numbered III/44 in the Hoboken catalogue. Its movements are listed below, with their opening themes.

First movement:

Second movement:

Third movement:

Fourth movement

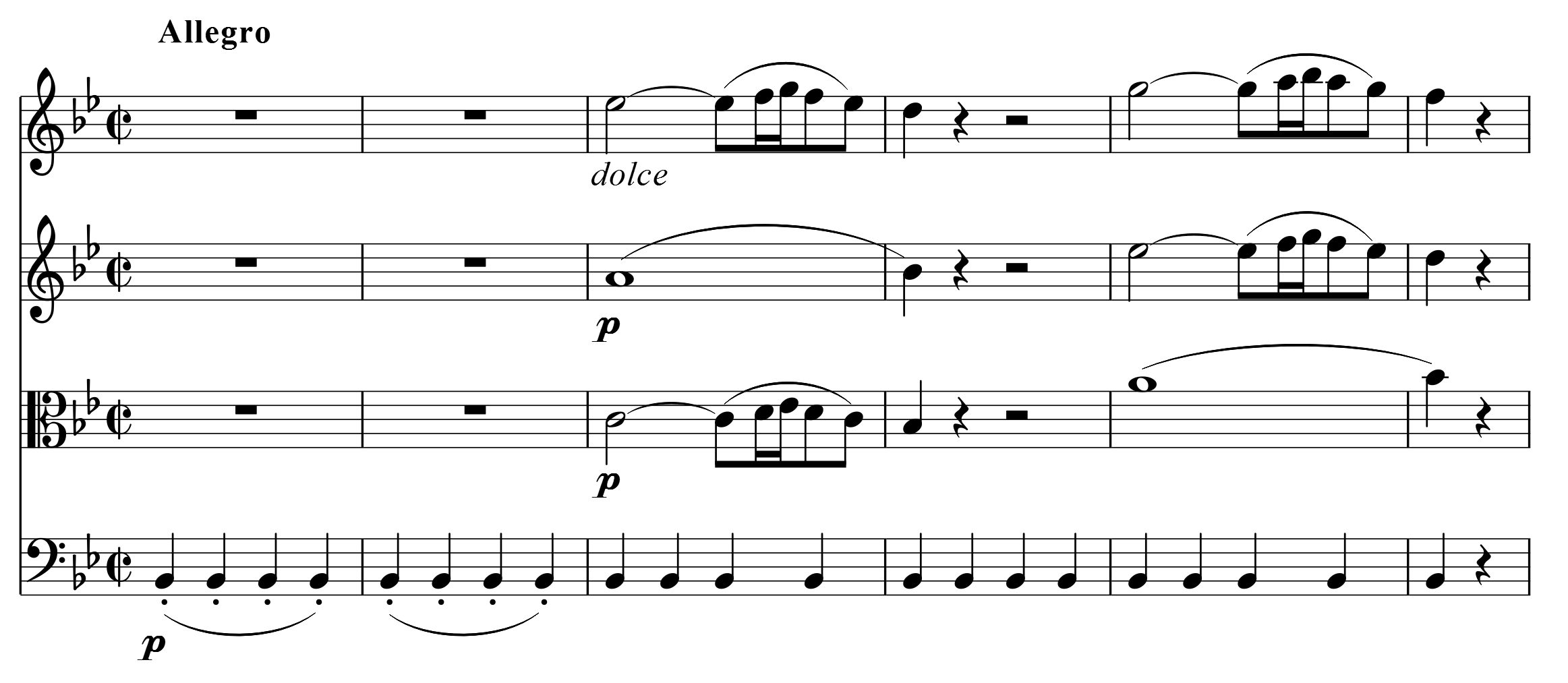
The opening measures of the first movement

The first movement is in cut common (2/2) time. It starts with the cello, alone, playing eight quarter notes on the same B♭. It is not until the third measure of the movement that the violins and viola enter. The cello's eight throbbing notes act as more than an introduction. They reappear at critical junctures throughout the movement, including at the beginning of the development and recapitulation sections, illustrating that they are part of the movement's primary thematic material. The melody that follows the eight cello notes echoes Mozart's Violin Sonata K.454 and is echoed in Beethoven's String Quartet No. 1 (Op. 18, No. 1).

The first movement caught the admiration of the pianist and scholar Charles Rosen, who devoted several pages of his book The Classical Style (1997) to it. Rosen suggests that essentially everything in this movement is musically derived from just two elements: (a) the ostinato notes repeated by the cello at the opening, and (b) the up-down sequence played by the first violin and viola in the third and fourth bars. Both (a) and (b) are repeated played in varied forms and in different keys. Rosen provides an annotated version of the entire exposition section (pp. 121-131) to show how it is derived from (a) + (b). He concludes:

Neither (a) nor (b) alone is sufficient, but from the opposition between them and from their shape Haydn derives his larger structure. There are no tunes, few rhythmic surprises, fewer dramatic harmonies. Yet is it fascinating and witty music, in which Haydn, intent on dazzling us with his technique, makes splendid bricks with hardly any straw at all.

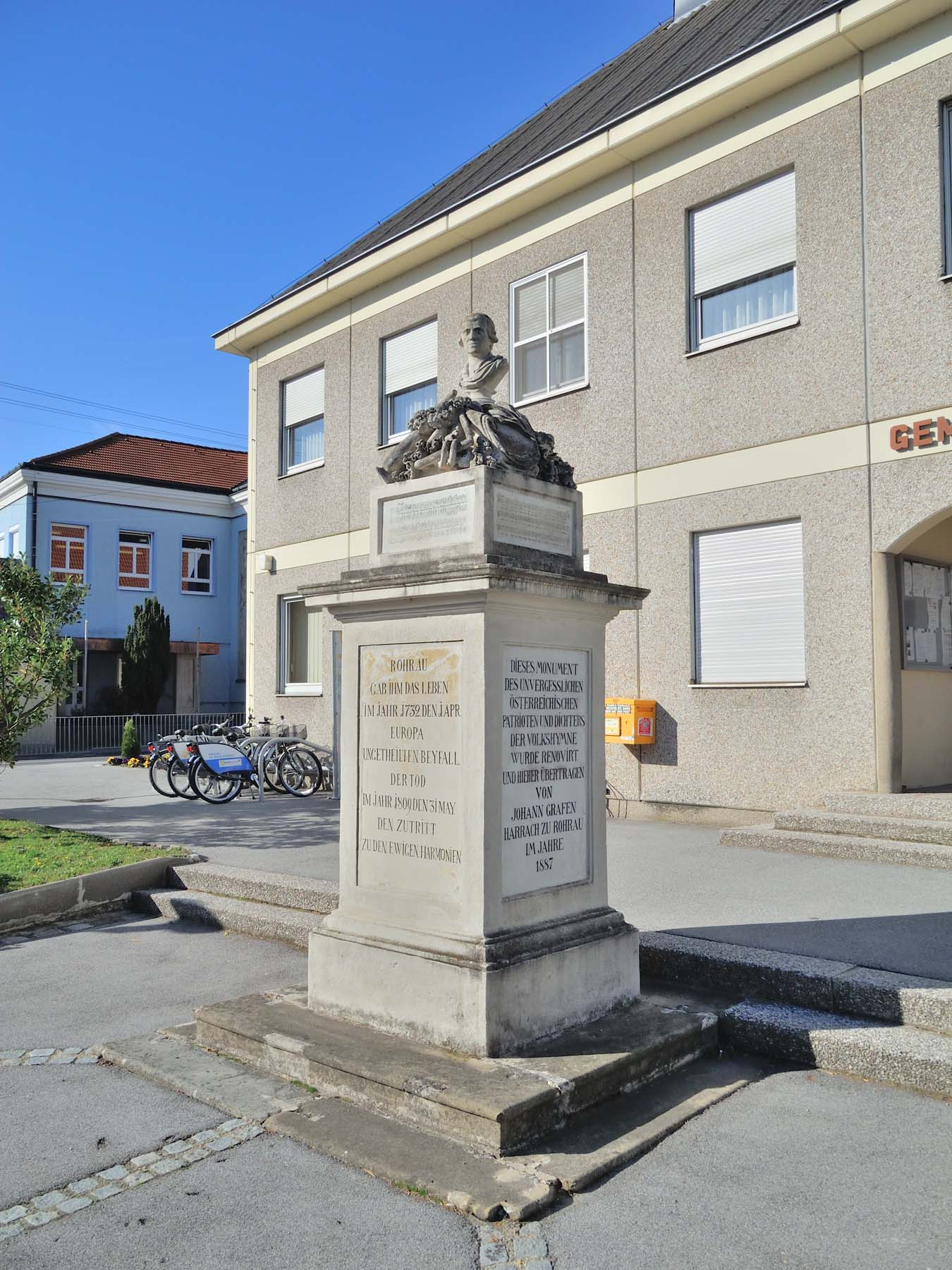
The Haydn monument in Rohrau, Austria. The theme from Opus 50 no. 1, with Baumberg's lyrics, is inscribed on the upper level.

The second movement is in E♭ major and strophic form, with a statement of a theme followed by three variations (the second of which is in E♭ minor) and a coda. Haydn used a similar design for the slow movement of the Opus 20, No. 4 quartet. In 1793 the poet Gabriele von Baumberg set the movement's theme to words, for inscription on a monument honouring Haydn in the composer's home town of Rohrau, Austria.

The third movement, a minuet and trio, features motivic elements that hark back to the previous two movements. In the trio, Haydn uses off-beat entries and second-beat sforzandos to disrupt what would otherwise be a regular and conventional triple metre.

The fourth movement, in sonata form but with characteristics of a rondo, is replete with Haydnesque false recapitulations and conclusions. In one example, the music lands in the tonic at the end of the recapitulation and apparent coda, and is followed by two measures of complete silence, creating an illusion of finality. However, the main theme is then reprised, and the real conclusion to the work follows some 20 measures later.

== Opus 50, No. 2 ==
The second quartet of the set, in C major, is numbered III/45 in the Hoboken catalogue. Its movements are listed below, with their opening themes.

First movement:

Second movement:

Third movement:

Fourth movement:

The first movement is in 3/4 time, hitherto uncommon among Haydn's opening movements. In this movement, Haydn departs from the monothematic approach that characterises many of his other sonata form movements in the set. The exposition presents two clearly distinct themes: the first in the tonic and the second in the dominant.

The second movement, in F major and marked "adagio cantabile", commences with the statement of the primary theme by the second violin, before it is taken up by the first violin in the ninth measure. The first violin part enjoys a move into a high register in the movement's central section as well as an elaborate solo passage towards the end of the movement. The movement's central section also features a five-measure passage of sixteenth notes for the cello, perhaps specially written for the opus's cellist dedicatee.

The opening measure of the minuet, after an upbeat, is a descending C-major triad (G–E–C) played by the first violin. The trio inverts this opening with an ascending triad (C–E–G) played by the second violin.

The finale is in sonata form. It features significant developments of a simple motif, and considerable dialogue between the four parts. The finale also contains a high degree of chromaticism, a feature that links the four movements of the work. The musicologist W. Dean Sutcliffe points to the recurrence of C♯ at key points in each movement, serving at different times to create dissonance, to commence modulation away from the tonic, or, as in the case of the finale, as a device for inflection.

== Opus 50, No. 3 ==
The third quartet of the set, in E♭ major, is numbered III/46 in the Hoboken catalogue. Its movements are:

First movement:

Second movement:

Third movement:

Fourth movement:

This is a concise work, in terms of its duration, the economy of thematic material presented, and also the narrow registers within which the four parts operate. The first movement is in 6/8 time and a monothematic sonata form. The development and recapitulation sections feature an example of Haydn's musical jokes. In this case he tinkers with the movement's sonata form by reference to an historical variation of it. The recapitulation starts only with a statement of the second phrase of the movement's theme, which is in the dominant. This would have been a common technique earlier in the eighteenth century that, in this instance, is liable to confuse the unknowing listener looking for the statement of the first phrase of the theme in the tonic. It is not until 27 measures later that the listener is presented with a more emphatic reprise, which is actually a coda. The coda involves the statement of the main theme in the tonic that the listener might have been expecting, and it does so after two measures of pointed silence.

The form of the second movement, an Andante in B♭ major, is undefinable. The movement involves elements of a theme and variations, but also has characteristics of both a ternary form movement and a rondo. Unlike a conventional theme and variation movement, the minor mode variation is placed immediately after the statement of the theme; normally, the minor mode theme would be held back for later in the movement. The second variation involves very little actual variation, and is closer to a literal re-statement of the theme that one would see in ternary form or a rondo. Also unconventionally, the second and third so-called variations are separated by an eight-measure free-form passage. The cello enjoys a prominent role throughout the movement, with the viola often substituting as the bass accompaniment. The cello also presents the movement's opening theme.

The one exception to the compactness of the quartet comes in the minuet. The minuet's first half is a standard 12 measures, but the second half is an unusually long 44 measures and involves harmonic excursions deep into the flat-side keys. The trio echoes the first and fourth movements by commencing with a B♭ upbeat leading to an E♭.

The finale completes the interconnectedness of the work with a theme audibly similar to those of the first movement and the minuet and trio. The movement is the most economical of all: the exposition and development commence with nearly identical passages and conclude in exactly the same way.

== Opus 50, No. 4 ==
The fourth quartet of the set, in F♯ minor, is numbered III/47 in the Hoboken catalogue. Its movements are:

First movement:

Second movement:

Third movement:

Fourth movement:

This is the only quartet of the set in a minor key. Haydn employed F♯ minor as the home key of only three of his known works: this, his Symphony No. 45 ("Farewell"), and his Piano Trio No. 40 (Hob. XV/26).

The first movement's exposition commences in the tonic of F♯ minor, before modulating to the relative major of A. After a long development section, the recapitulation both arrives and concludes in F♯ major. Sutcliffe argues that the perfunctory major-key conclusion is not a "happy ending" but an "uneasy truce" that paves the way for the remainder of the quartet, the finale of which concludes in a minor key.

The second movement continues the major-minor tussle that pervades the work as a whole. It is in double variation form, with the first theme in A major and the second theme in A minor. Again the movement ends abruptly, with an A-major chord.

The relationship of the minuet (in F♯ major) and the trio (in F♯ minor) continues the overall tension between major and minor. The minuet features a startling harmonic shift: its second half is suddenly interrupted by a fortissimo D-major chord, far remote from the home key, before a chromatic passage leads back to the dominant of C♯ major. The trio is linked to the minuet by the rhythmic similarities of their opening motifs.

The finale is a fugue that builds on motifs presented in the earlier three movements. The musicologist Donald Tovey, writing in 1929, described the fugue as "tragic" on the scale of Beethoven's String Quartet No. 14 (Op. 131), although Sutcliffe argues that the movement is more strained and discomforting than tragic.

== Opus 50, No. 5 ("The Dream") ==
The fifth quartet of the set, in F major, is numbered III/48 in the Hoboken catalogue. Its movements are:

First movement:

Second movement:

Third movement:

Fourth movement:

With its 2/4 time signature, pulse occurring on the eight notes, and "allegro moderato" tempo, the metre of the first movement is a throwback to an earlier and simpler style of opening movement. It begins with a simple duet between the two violins, before a second subject area that involves rapid sextuplets. The movement continues to feature subtle textural conversation between the violins, viola and cello that is not resolved until the coda.

The second movement, in B♭ major, is in two parts: an exposition and a recapitulation. The first violin plays the leading role throughout, although the movement is characterised by rich textures between the four parts created by compositional devices such as contrary motion. It is this movement that gives the Op. 50, No. 5 the nickname of "Der Traum", or "The Dream".

The minuet is in F major, but it is not until well into its second half that a strong chord in the tonic arrives. Once again among the Opus 50 minuets, Haydn is unsettling harmonic conventions. Haydn also toys with metre towards the end of the minuet: it moves into, and concludes, essentially in duple time. The trio follows, and its theme is almost identical to that of the minuet, albeit in a minor key and played by all four parts in unison.

Sutcliffe refers to the finale as the "one disappointing movement" of the Opus 50 quartets, arguing that it is "too straightforward structurally", lacks "internal tension", and might have been the product of the composer's rush to finish the work, which was holding up publication of the whole set.

== Opus 50, No. 6 ("The Frog") ==
The sixth and final quartet of the set, in D major, is numbered III/49 in the Hoboken catalogue. Its movements are:

First movement:

Second movement:#Poco adagio

1. Third movement:

Fourth movement:

Haydn's choice of D major for this quartet, with the second movement in D minor, optimises the use of open strings and allows for the work to be the loudest and most grandiose of the set. The first movement opens peculiarly: the first violin starts on an E, and proceeds to play a four-measure phrase that concludes with a D major chord. The use of a closing phrase to start the movement is the first of a number of unsettling incidents in the movement. The exposition withholds the expected cadence to the dominant almost until the exposition ends. And the movement itself has a tentative pianissimo ending that serves more as a link to the D-minor Adagio than a proper conclusion.

The Adagio is in sonata form and presents a single theme. While the exposition modulates to a re-statement of the theme in F major, the recapitulation modulates to D major. The movement ends in that key, pianissimo, with a segue (an explicit direction given by Haydn to avoid too long a pause between the movements) to the D-major minuet.

The minuet is the shortest among those of the Opus 50, but the trio features an exceptionally long second section, which uses drifting melodies, a fermata and a pair of two-measure pauses to create a sense of timelessness. Neither the minuet nor the trio reaches a proper conclusion, and in this they continue a feature of the first two movements. The minuet ends with a perfunctory reprise of its main theme and the trio draws out its final cadence with a chromatic passage marked "diminuendo". Again, Haydn reinforces the interconnectedness between the movements with an explicit direction to the performers for an immediate segue from the reprised minuet to the finale.

The finale brings out Haydn's playfulness. The sound effect that predominates is unison bariolage, a technique heard for instance at the very opening: the first violinist fingers the note A on the D string, then bows in a way that rapidly alternates playing this fingered A with the identically-pitched A on the adjacent open (unfingered) A string. The resulting strange pulsating effect is the consequence of an open string having a quite distinct timbre (louder, more ringing) from a fingered one. Haydn employed unison bariolage in a number of his works (such as the "Farewell" Symphony), but nowhere is it employed as obsessively as in the Opus 50 No. 6 finale. The sound of unison bariolage has reminded some listeners of a croaking frog, and is what earned the quartet its nickname. But the movement is no mere auditory joke. It contains important thematic connections to the earlier movements that, aside from the explicit segues between movements, result in a significant degree of cyclic integration. The most important thematic connection is that the closing-phrase opening of the first movement reappears in the finale in a modified form: it no longer stands alone, but as the second part of an eight-measure phrase that forms the movement's secondary theme. Presented in this context, the ambiguity inherent in its appearance in the first movement is resolved.
