= Mannheim school =

Techniques pioneered by the court orchestra of Mannheim

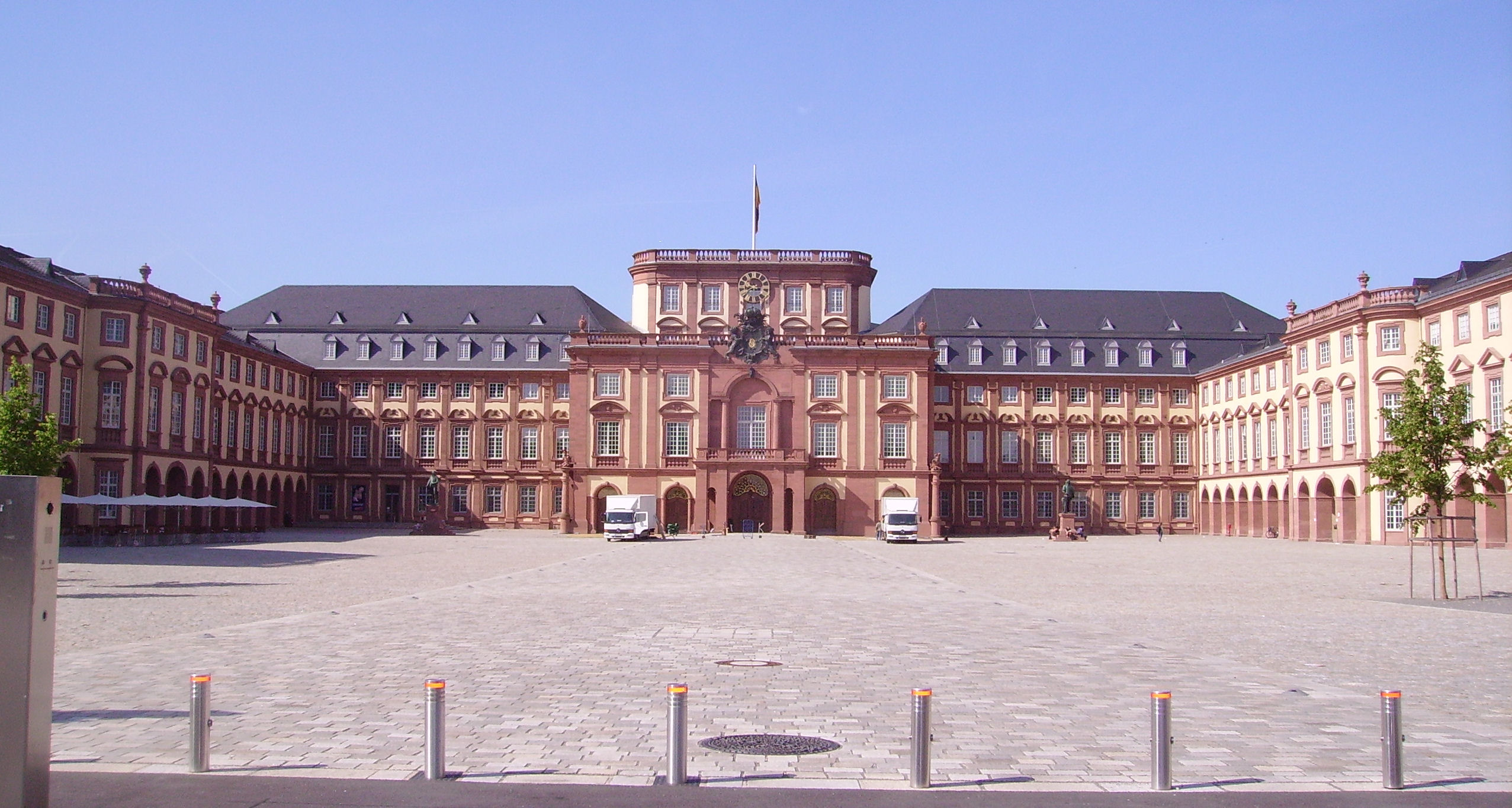
The courtyard of the palace at Mannheim

Mannheim school refers to both the orchestral techniques pioneered by the court orchestra of the Elector Palatine in Mannheim in the latter half of the 18th century, and the group of composers of the early classical period who composed for the orchestra of Mannheim. The father of the school is considered to be the Bohemian composer Johann Stamitz. Besides him, two generations of composers wrote compositions for the orchestra, whose reputation was due to its excellent discipline and the individual skill of its players; the English traveler Charles Burney called it "an army of generals". Their performance style included new dynamic elements, crescendos and diminuendos. Composers of the Mannheim school played an important role in the development of the classical period's genres and of the classical symphony form.

== History ==
The origins of the Mannheim school go back to the court of the Elector Charles III Philip, who moved from Heidelberg to Mannheim in 1720, already employing an orchestra larger than those of any of the surrounding courts. The orchestra grew even further in the following decades and came to include some of the best virtuosi of the time. Under the guidance of Kapellmeister Carlo Grua, the court hired such talents as Johann Stamitz, who is generally considered to be the founder of the Mannheim school, in 1741/42, and he became its director in 1750.

The most notable of the revolutionary techniques of the Mannheim orchestra were its more independent treatment of the wind instruments, and its famous whole-orchestra crescendo. Contemporary musicians mentioned the high level of the orchestra, among them, Leopold Mozart in 1763, and W. A. Mozart in his letters in 1777/78, and the English music historian Charles Burney.

The role of the Mannheim school's composers in the evolution of the classical symphony is thus significant, although most scholars now agree that these changes occurred nearly simultaneously at various other centers, e.g. in Berlin and Vienna. Their influence on the evolution of the classical music period is due to the reputation of the ensemble at one hand, and on the other hand to the fact that the compositions of the Mannheim school's composers were published in Paris and London.

== Composers ==
Members of the Mannheim school included Johann Stamitz, Franz Xaver Richter, Ignaz Holzbauer, Carl Stamitz, Franz Ignaz Beck, Ignaz Fränzl, and Christian Cannabich, and it had a very direct influence on many major symphonists of the time, including Joseph Haydn and Leopold Hofmann. (Cannabich, one of the directors of the orchestra after the death of J. Stamitz, was also a good friend of Wolfgang Amadeus Mozart from the latter's visit to Mannheim in 1777 onwards.)

Johann Stamitz visited Paris, and the Mannheim school had an influence on the Concert Spirituel Sacred Concert since 1754. When Joseph Legros took over the Parisian concert series Concert Spirituel, the relationship with the Mannheim School flourished and the music of Haydn became extremely popular in Paris. Prominent concerts in Paris during the 1770s were the Concert de la Loge Olympique (Concert of the Olympic Lodge) and the Concert des Amateurs (Concert for the Fans) which may have been part of the Concert Spirituel.

Claude-François-Marie Rigoley (the Comte d'Ogny) commissioned Joseph Haydn's six "Paris Symphonies", Nr. 82–87, for performance by Concert de la Loge Olympique. Chevalier de Saint-Georges conducted their world premiere. The influence of the Mannheim school is evident in these symphonies.

== Musical innovations ==
Mannheim Rocket at the beginning of the fourth movement of Mozart's Symphony No. 40

Composers of the Mannheim school introduced a number of novel ideas into the orchestral music of their day: sudden crescendos – the Mannheim Crescendo (a crescendo developed via the whole orchestra) – and diminuendos; crescendos with piano releases; the Mannheim Rocket (a swiftly ascending passage typically having a rising arpeggiated melodic line together with a crescendo); the Mannheim Roller (an extended crescendo passage typically having a rising melodic line over an ostinato bass line); the Mannheim Sigh (a mannered treatment of the Baroque practice of putting more weight on the first of two notes in descending pairs of slurred notes); the Mannheim Birds (imitation of birds chirping in solo passages); the Mannheim Climax (a high-energy section of music where all instruments drop out except for the strings, usually preceded by a Mannheim Crescendo); and the Grand Pause where the playing stops for a moment, resulting in total silence, only to restart vigorously. The Mannheim Rocket can be a rapidly ascending broken chord from the lowest range of the bass line to the very top of the soprano line. Its influence can be found at the beginning of the fourth movement of Mozart's Symphony No. 40 and the start of Eine kleine Nachtmusik, and the very start of Beethoven's Piano Sonata No. 1 in F minor, Op. 2, No. 1.

Members of the Mannheim school abandoned quickly the praxis of the basso continuo in their compositions, which was almost universal in the Baroque era, and they used the minimum of contrapuntal elaboration. One of their chief innovations is the four-movement symphony form, introducing the menuet as its third movement, which was originally one of the Baroque suite's movements. The Mannheim school played an important role in the development of the sonata form, which is generally the form of the classical symphony's first movement. In their orchestration practice, the clarinet appears both as part of the woodwind section and as a solo instrument.

== Recordings ==
- Clarinet Concertos by The Mannheim School Seven concertos by Carl Stamitz; works by Franz Danzi, Franz Anton Dimmler, Josef Fiala, Frédéric Blasius, Sébastien Demar, Georg Friedrich Fuchs, Franz Tausch, Peter Winter; Karl Schlechta, clarinet and basset horn; Kurpfälzisches Kammerorchester, Jiří Malát, conductor. Arte Nova 74321 37327 2, 5 discs
- Many of the Mannheim symphonists have now been recorded on Chandos and the Naxos labels in various numbers of volumes per composer. J. Stamitz 2 volumes, F. X. Richter 2 volumes, Carl Stamitz, Cannabich 2 volumes, etc.
- Conductor Simon Murphy has made several recordings of the very first Mannheim School symphonies for Pentatone, including early four part, string symphonies by J. Stamitz and F. X. Richter.
