= 1785 in music =

== Events ==
- January 1 – Giovanni Paisiello officially leaves his employment at the court of Catherine the Great in Russia, having returned to Italy some months earlier.
- January 12 – Wolfgang Amadeus Mozart's Die Entführung aus dem Serail is produced by impresario Pasquale Bondini's company in Dresden.
- January 15 – The first performance of Wolfgang Amadeus Mozart's six string quartets dedicated to Joseph Haydn (or possibly just three of them) is given in Mozart's own home.
- January 21 – Soprano Nancy Storace, who was about to give birth, was replaced as Rosina in a Vienna production of Giovanni Paisiello's Il barbiere di Siviglia by Luisa Laschi, to great acclaim.
- February 7 – Leopold Mozart leaves Munich for Vienna, with a pupil, Heinrich Marchand, in tow.
- February 26 – Polish violinist Feliks Janiewicz makes what was probably his debut as a soloist in a concert at the Burgtheater in Vienna.
- March 7 – King Ferdinand I of Naples awards a lifetime annual salary of 1,200 ducats to Giovanni Paisiello, on the understanding that the latter writes one new opera every year.
- March 28 – Domenico Cimarosa becomes second organist at the Chapel Royal of Naples.
- September 19 – Amélie-Julie Candeille makes her Comédie-Française début as a singer.
- October 13 – The Lord Chamberlain, James Cecil, Earl of Salisbury, refuses to grant a licence to Giovanni Gallini for his Italian Opera House in London, unless he appoints a Mr. Crawford as deputy manager.
- October 26 – Joseph Haydn receives a visit from Venezuelan revolutionary Francisco de Miranda, to whom he gives a guided tour of Schloss Esterházy.
- November 22 – The Hermitage Theatre in St Petersburg, Russia, is officially opened.
- Composer John Antes is appointed warder of the Fulneck Moravian Settlement in England
- Composer Supply Belcher settles in Maine.
- Opera composer Michele Mortellari relocates to London from his native Italy.
- Pietro Leopoldo, Grand Duke of Tuscany appoints Filippo Maria Gherardeschi organist and maestro di cappella at the Chiesa Conventuale dei Cavalieri di S Stefano at Pisa.
- Violinist Regina Strinasacchi marries Johann Conrad Schlick, cellist & Konzertmeister of the Gotha ducal band.

== Bands formed ==
- Band of the Coldstream Guards (16 May)

== Published popular music ==
- "Cara sposa", music by Johann Christian Bach from the cantata Rinaldo ed Armide (lost)
- "Song of the Page", music by William Shield from Follies of a Day, or The Marriage of Figaro
- "Black-eyed Susan", by Robert Broderip

== Classical music ==
- Carl Friedrich Abel – 4 Trio Sonatas, WK 98–101 (Op. 16)
- Carl Philipp Emanuel Bach – 2 Sonaten, 2 Fantasien und 2 Rondos für Kenner und Liebhaber, Wq.59
- Johann Christian Bach
  - 6 Violin Sonatas, Op.10 (posthumously)
  - 2 Symphonies, Op. 18 (posthumously)
- Ludwig van Beethoven – Three quartets for harpsichord, violin, viola, and cello, in E♭ major, D major, and C major, WoO 36
- William Billings – "I Was Glad When They Said Unto Me, We Will Go Into The House Of Ye Lord"
- Luigi Boccherini – Cello Concerto No. 10 in D major, G.483
- William Boyce, Ten Voluntaries
- Giuseppe Maria Cambini
  - 6 Flute Quartets, T.145–150
  - 6 Trios for Flute, Oboe and Bassoon, Op. 45
- Muzio Clementi – Six piano sonatas, Op. 13
- Francois Devienne – Flute Concerto No.3 in G major
- Carl Ditters von Dittersdorf – Six Symphonies after Ovid's Metamorphoses (comp. 1781, first three published 1785)
- Anton Eberl – Symphony in C major
- Giuseppe (or Tomasso) Giordani – Caro Mio Ben
- Joseph Haydn
  - Symphony 83 in G minor "La poule"
  - Symphony 85 in B-flat "La Reine"
  - Symphony 87 in A major, Hob.I:87
  - Overture in D major, Hob.Ia:4
  - 12 Minuets, Hob.IX:8
  - Piano Trios, Op.27 (Hob.XV:2,9,10)
- Franz Anton Hoffmeister
  - Double Bass Concerto No.1 in E-flat major
  - Keyboard Sonata in A major, WeiH 37
- Wolfgang Amadeus Mozart
  - Piano Concertos 20 in D minor and 21 in C major
  - String Quartet No.18 in A major, K.464
  - String Quartet in C, "Dissonance"
  - Lied zur Gesellenreise, K. 468
  - Davidde penitente, K. 469
  - Fantasia in C minor, K. 475
  - Piano Quartet No. 1, K. 478
- Giovanni Paisiello – Il ritorno di Perseo, R.2.6 (cantata)
- Ignaz Pleyel
  - String Quartet
  - Symphony in D major, B.126
- Joseph Bologne de Saint Georges – 6 String Quartets, Op. 14
- Johann Schenk – Die Weinlese (singspiel)
- John Stanley – "Delusive is the poet's dream"
- Gaetano Valeri – 12 Organ Sonatas, Op. 1
- Friedrich Witt – Symphony in A major
- Ernst Wilhelm Wolf – 3 String Quartets, Op. 3
- Maria Carolina Wolf – Glänzender sinket die Sonne

== Opera ==
- Gaetano Andreozzi – Giasone e Medea
- Marcello Bernardini – Le donne bisbetiche, o sia L'antiquario fanatico, Teatro Pace, Rome (during carnival).
- Pierre-Joseph Candeille – Pizarre, ou La conquête de Pérou, Opéra, Paris (3 May)
- Luigi Cherubini – La finta principessa, King's Theatre, London (9 April)
- Domenico Cimarosa – La donna sempre al suo peggior s'appiglia
- Prosper-Didier Deshayes – Le Faux serment
- Carl Ditters von Dittersdorf Der Hufschmied (Der gelehrte Hufschmied) (German version, text translated by J. C. Kaffka, of Il maniscalco, 1775), Breslau (13 May)
- Robert Jephson – Campaign, or Love in the East Indies, Theatre Royal, Covent Garden, London (12 May)
- Thomas Linley
  - Hurly-Burly, or The Fairy of the Well, Theatre Royal, Drury Lane, London (26 December)
  - Strangers at Home, Theatre Royal, Drury Lane, London (8 December)
- Michele Mortellari
  - Armida abbandonata, Teatro della Pergola, Florence (autumn)
  - L'infanta supposta, Teatro Ducale, Modena
- Giovanni Paisiello – La grotta di Trofonio, R.1.69
- Ignaz Pleyel – Ifigenia in Aulide
- Johann Friedrich Reichardt – Artemisia
- Antonio Salieri – La Grotta di Trofonio
- Giuseppe Sarti – I finti eredi
- William Shield
  - The Nunnery, Covent Garden, London (12 April)
  - The Choleric Fathers, Covent Garden, London (10 November)
  - Omai, or A Trip Round the World, Covent Garden, London (20 December)
- Stephen Storace – Gli sposi malcontenti, Burgtheater, Vienna (1 June)

== Births ==
- February 2 – Isabella Colbran, coloratura soprano and composer (died 1845)
- March 3
  - Nicola Petrini Zamboni, composer (died 1849)
  - Giovanni Ricordi, violinist and opera publisher (died 1853)
- March 6 – Karol Kurpiński, Polish composer (died 1857)
- March 19 – Pierre-Joseph-Guillaume Zimmermann, composer (died 1853)
- April 4 – Bettina Brentano, composer and writer (died 1859)
- April 19 – Alexandre Pierre François Boëly, composer (died 1858)
- August 18 – Friedrich Wieck, piano teacher, father of Clara Schumann (died 1873)
- September 5 – Thomas Adams, organist and composer (died 1858)
- September 11 – Alpheus Babcock, American piano maker (died 1842)
- November 2 – Friedrich Kalkbrenner, pianist and composer (died 1849)
- date unknown
  - Max Bohrer, German-born composer and cellist (died 1867)
  - Zofia Dmuszewska, Polish actor and opera singer (died 1807)

== Deaths ==
- January 3 – Baldassare Galuppi, composer (born 1706)
- April 26 – Karl Siegmund von Seckendorff, composer and noble (born 1744)
- May 15 – Karel Blažej Kopřiva, organist and composer (born 1756)
- June 2 – Gottfried August Homilius, organist, cantor and composer (born 1714)
- June 22 – Matthias Vanden Gheyn, composer (born 1721)
- August 31 – Pietro Chiari, librettist (born 1712)
- November 19 – Bernard de Bury, composer (born 1720)
- December 8 – Antonio Maria Mazzoni, composer (born 1717)
- December 29 – Johann Heinrich Rolle, composer (born 1716)
- date unknown
  - Giovanni Battista Gervasio, composer and musician (born c. 1725)
  - Antoine Mahaut, composer and flautist (born 1719)
