= Symphony No. 86 (Haydn) =

Symphony in four movements by Joseph Haydn

- by Joseph Haydn
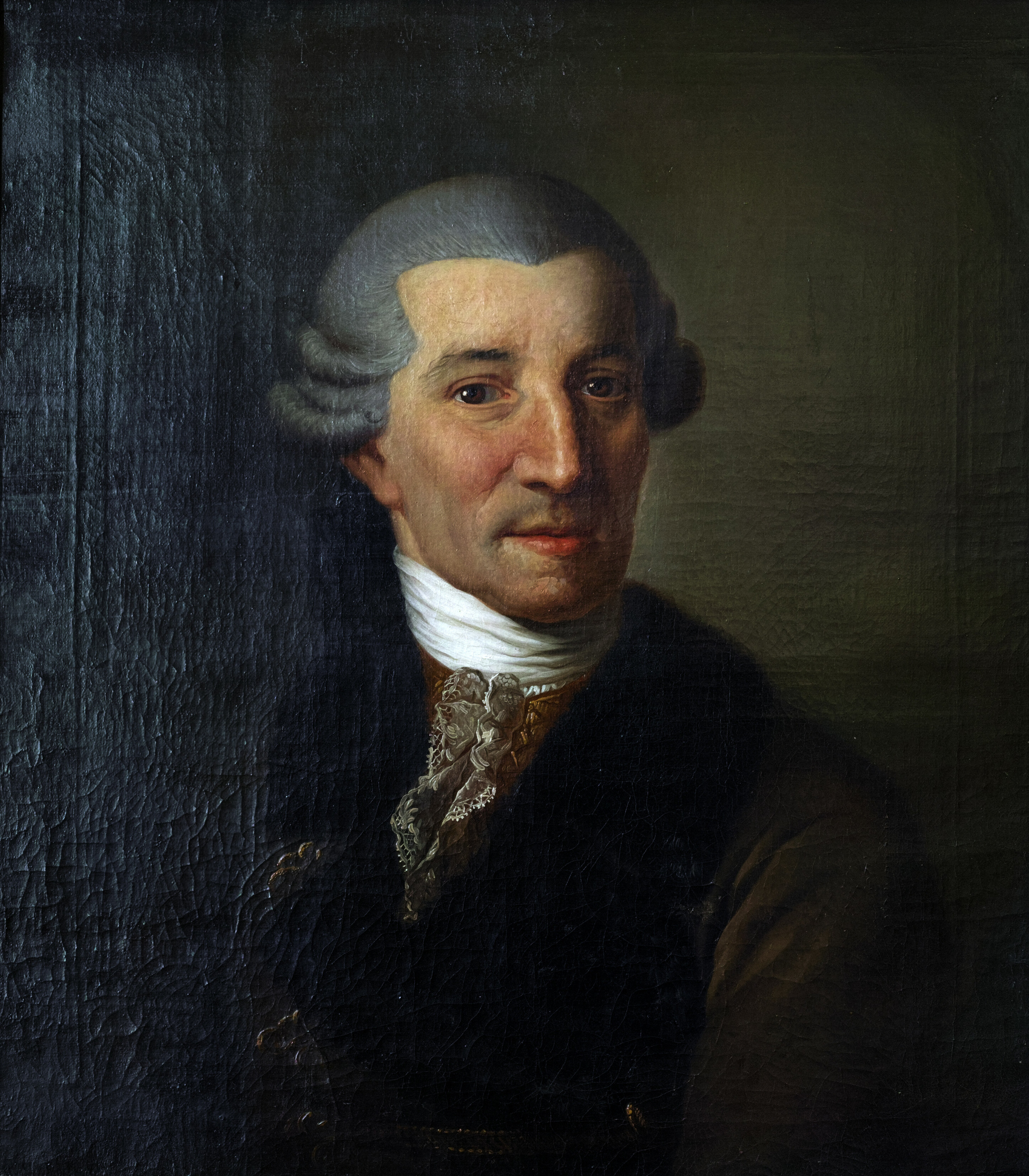
- Haydn at the time he wrote the symphony
- Key: D major
- Catalogue: Hob. I:86
- Composed: 1786
- Dedication: Claude-François-Marie Rigoley, Comte d'Ogny
- Movements: 4

Premiere
- Date: 1787
- Location: Paris
- Performers: Concert de la Loge Olympique

The Symphony No. 86 in D major, Hoboken I/86, is the fifth of the six Paris Symphonies (numbers 82–87) written by Joseph Haydn, and was written to be performed in Paris in 1787. He wrote it in Esterháza in 1786, but for an orchestra much larger, at the instigation of Count Claude d'Ogney.

== Music ==
The work is in standard four movement form and scored for flute, two oboes, two bassoons, two trumpets, two horns, timpani and strings (violin I, violin II, viola, cello, double bass). Out of the six Paris symphonies, the 86th and 82nd are the only two to use percussion and trumpets.

There are four movements:

1. Adagio, 3/4 — Allegro spiritoso, 4/4
2. Capriccio: Largo, 3/4 in G major
3. Menuetto: Allegretto, 3/4
4. Finale: Allegro con spirito, 4/4

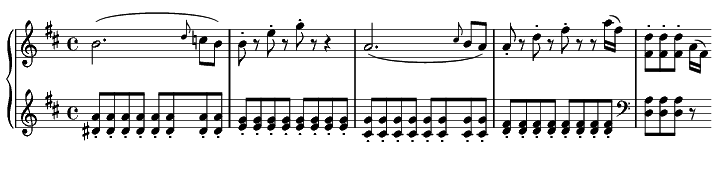

The first movement is in sonata form and is broadly conceived. An unusual feature is that the primary theme of the exposition begins "off-tonic" and does not resolve to the D major until five bars in. Similarly the secondary theme group also delays establishment of the dominant key.

The slow movement's "Capriccio" marking is used only one other time in Haydn's symphonic output; in the finale of the "A" version of the 53rd symphony.

The sonata-form finale is characterized by themes contain the rhythmic motif of five eighth-notes leading into the next bar. In most cases, these five notes are also repeated and staccato.
