= Symphony No. 82 (Haydn) =

Symphony by Joseph Haydn, popularly known as "The Bear"

- The Bear or L’Ours
- by Joseph Haydn
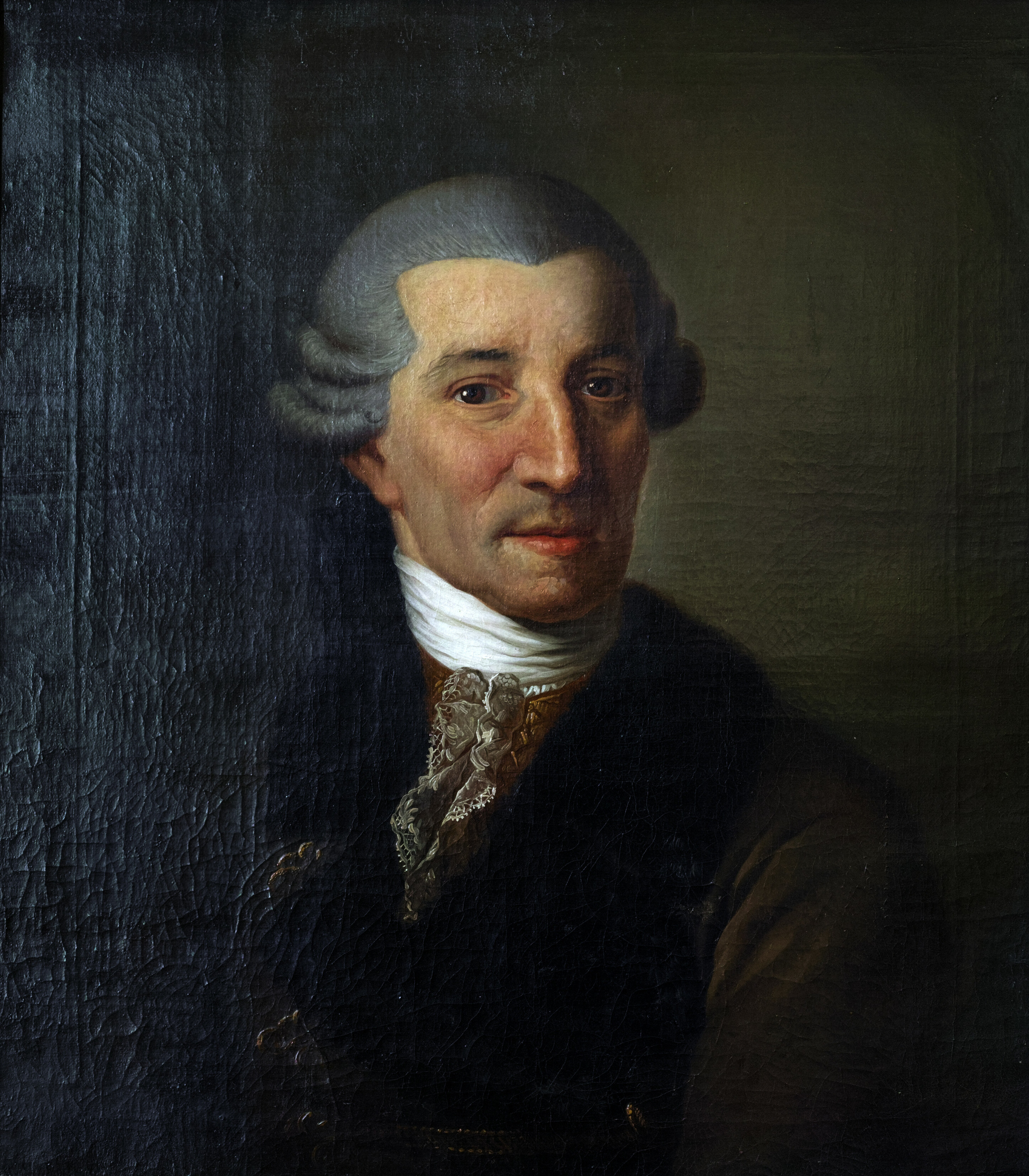
- Key: C major
- Catalogue: Hob. I:82
- Composed: 1786
- Dedication: Claude-François-Marie Rigoley, Comte d'Ogny
- Movements: 4

Premiere
- Date: 1787
- Location: Paris
- Conductor: Joseph Bologne, Chevalier de Saint-Georges
- Performers: Concert de la Loge Olympique

The Symphony No. 82 in C major, Hoboken 1/82, is the first of the six Paris Symphonies (numbers 82–87) written by Joseph Haydn. It is popularly known as the Bear Symphony.

== Background ==
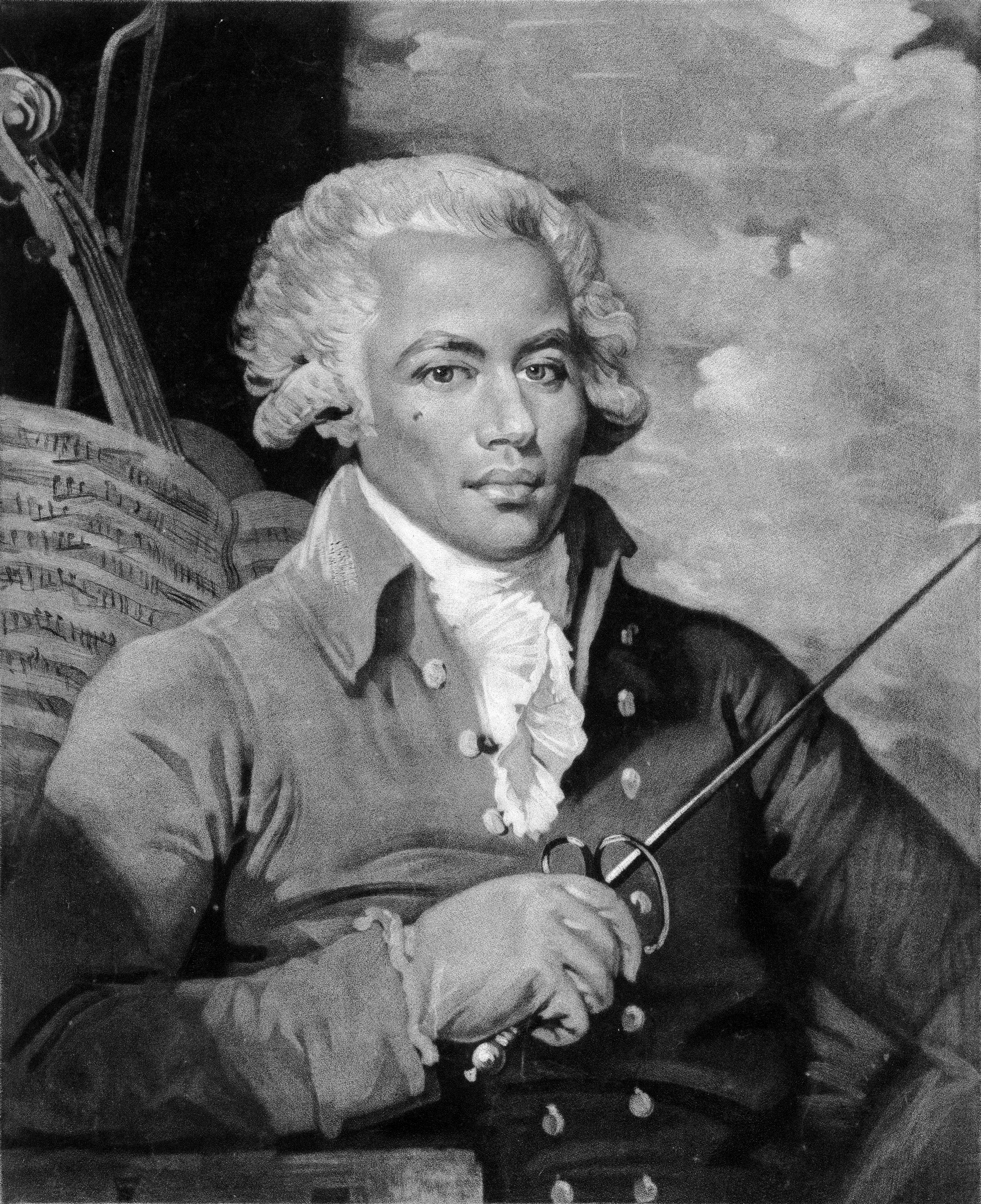
Joseph Bologne, the Chevalier de Saint-Georges, who conducted the premiere of the Symphony.

The symphony was one of a series of six symphonies commissioned in 1786 by the Concert de la Loge Olympique, a popular concert subscription in Paris (hence the name for the series as a whole). Like the other Paris symphonies, the Bear Symphony was written for the largest orchestral ensemble that Haydn had written for up until that time, including reinforced woodwind parts and a large string section. Despite its number, the symphony was actually the last of the six Paris symphonies to be composed. It was completed in 1786.

It was first performed in 1787 in Paris by the Concert de la Loge Olympique, directed by Joseph Bologne, Chevalier de Saint-Georges.

The work was published in Paris by the Imbault firm. Haydn's manuscript became the property of the Comte d'Ogny, who had commissioned the work; it resides today in the Bibliothèque Nationale of France.

== Nickname ==
The symphony has long been popularly referred to as the Bear Symphony. As with the nicknames of almost all of Haydn's symphonies, it did not originate with the composer. Instead, the name derives from a recurring feature from the last movement (including its famous opening), in which Haydn imitates the tonality of bagpipes or Dudelsack: a low sustained drone, accentuated by a grace-note on the downbeat. This curious tonality prompted an 1829 piano arrangement of the symphony to be entitled "Danse de l'Ours," the earliest known printed appearance of the nickname. This is a reference to the music used to accompany dancing bears — a popular form of street entertainment.

== Music ==
The symphony is scored for flute, two oboes, two bassoons, horns and/or trumpets, timpani, continuo (harpsichord) and strings. Early conflicting manuscript sources make the exact scoring for the brass unclear. Typically, however it is performed with both French horns and trumpets.

The work is in standard four-movement form:

1. Vivace assai, 3/4
2. Allegretto, 2/4 in double variation form.
3. Menuet e Trio, 3/4
4. Finale: Vivace, 2/4

=== I. Vivace assai ===
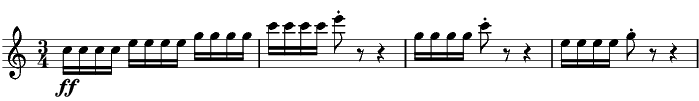

This movement fits into a historical pattern of exuberant, sometimes military expression for symphonies in C major; Mozart most celebrated symphony, the 41st, written two years later and in the same key, likewise opens with a movement in this style. The critic Richard Wigmore calls Haydn's opening movement "the apogee of [his] martial C major style, and one of the most dynamic, explosive movements he ever wrote. Amid the brass- and timpani-dominated aggression, the second theme comes as an oasis of bucolic calm." A program annotator for the New York Philharmonic wrote, "The entire movement is filled with delicious touches of instrumental color spiced with harmonic surprises, including some sharp dissonance. The form of this opening movement is traditional [i.e. sonata form], but its content is as fresh as the day it was written."

=== II. Allegretto ===
This takes the traditional position of a symphonic slow movement but is fairly brisk in tempo, marked allegretto. It is a double variations, a musical form particularly favored by Haydn for his symphonies, trios, and quartets. The two alternating themes are in F major and F minor. The movement ends with a substantial coda that (per Wigmore) "destabilizes the hitherto regular phrasing and introduces a new rustic dance tune."

=== III. Menuet e Trio ===
This is the minuet movement standard as the third movement for symphonies of the classical era. Wigmore notes the extreme contrast of the minuet section, reflecting the great pomp of the French royal court, and the trio section, written in the style of an Austrian Ländler.

=== IV. Finale: Vivace ===
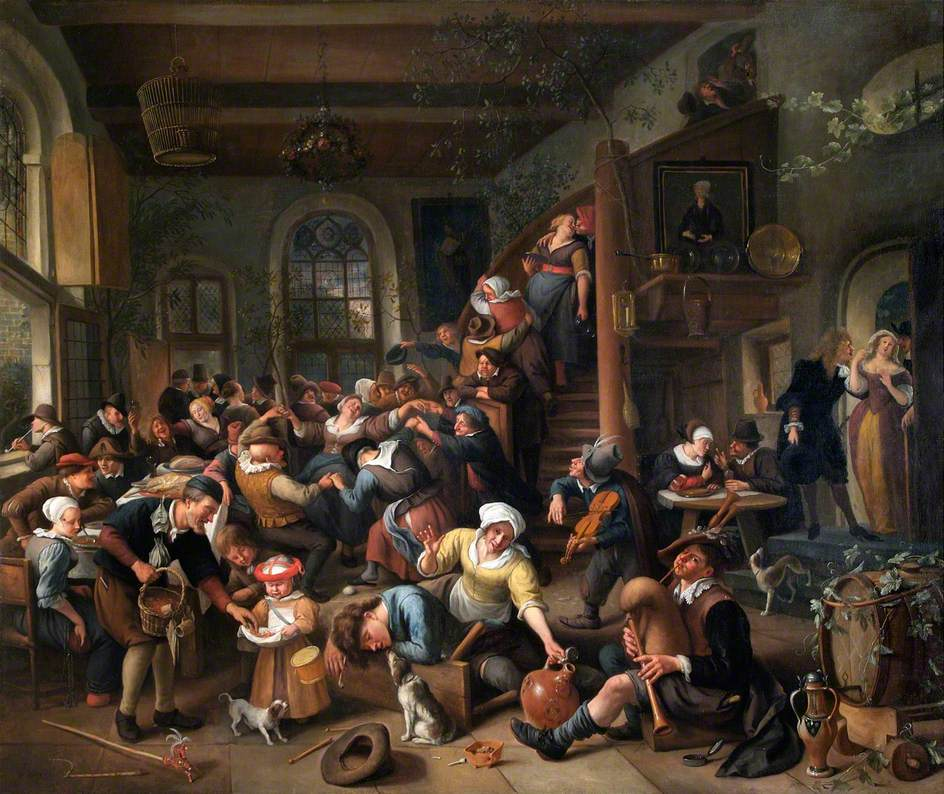
Peasants making merry to the music of bagpipes, as portrayed in the 17th century by Jan Steen

Of this movement, we cannot know if Haydn intended to depict an actual dancing bear, but the theme of peasants dancing wildly to the sound of bagpipes was a familiar one in his time; portrayed for instance in the trio section of the scherzo of Beethoven's Sixth Symphony (1808) or in the Wine Chorus of Haydn's own oratorio The Seasons (1801).

The finale movement of Symphony No. 82 has attracted particular critical admiration, not just for its energy, but for its musical sophistication. Wigmore writes, "Fusing the symphony's two dominant modes of C major ceremony and bucolic naivety, the finale is a movement of intoxicated verve and invention. The drones that underpin the ubiquitous "bear" tune are liable to invade the texture at any point, reaching extremes of rebarbative splendour at the start of the development and in the thunderous coda." The movement also attracted the admiration of the musicologist David Wyn Jones, who writes, "The finale is a sonata form whose opening theme seems, at first, to be a whimsical allusion: drone bass with a piping melody. Out of this commonplace material Haydn fashions a movement of striking power."

== See also ==
- List of symphonies by name
