= Symphony No. 87 (Haydn) =

Symphony in four movements by Joseph Haydn

- by Joseph Haydn
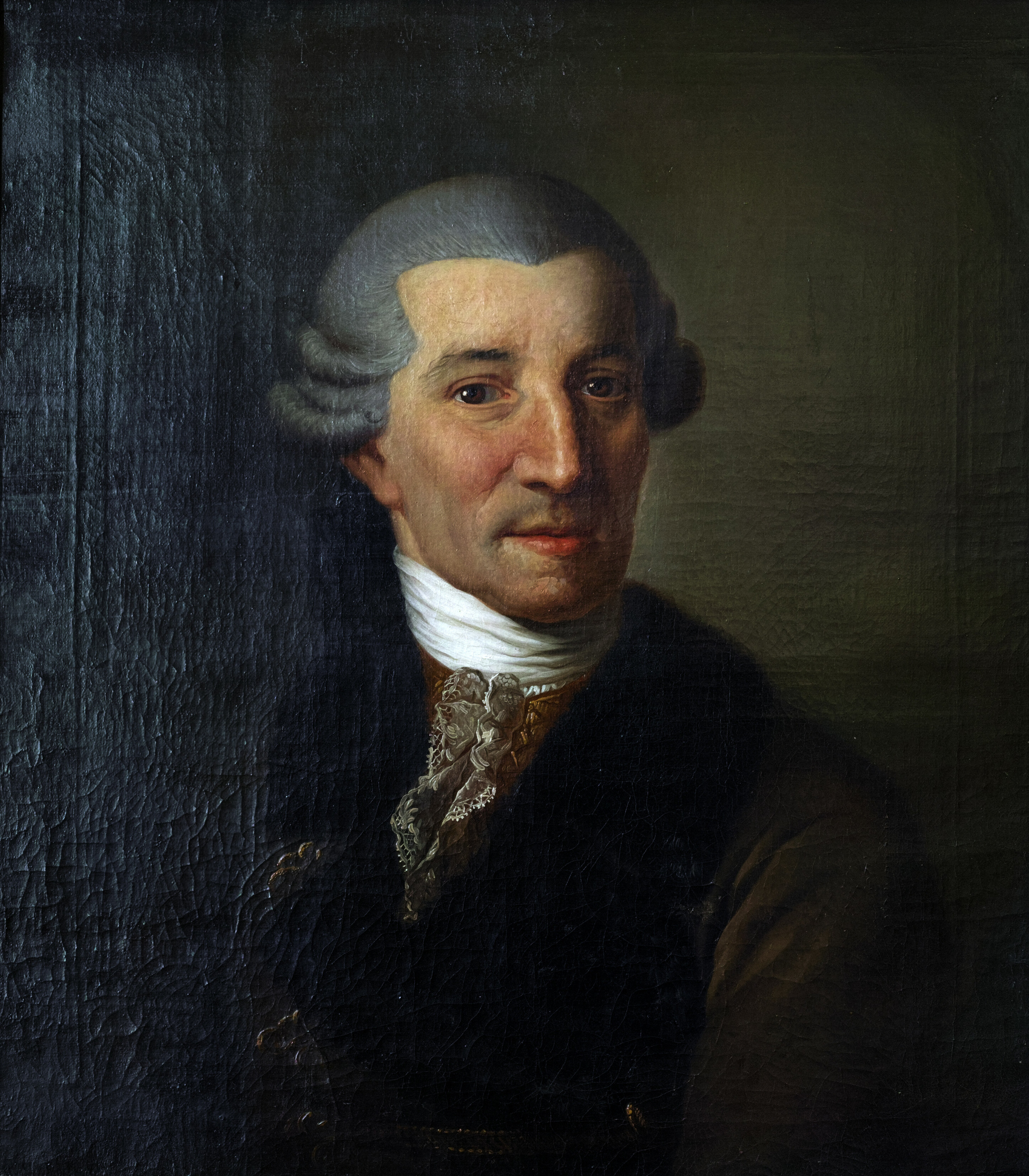
- Haydn at the time he wrote the symphony
- Key: A major
- Catalogue: Hob. I:87
- Composed: 1786
- Dedication: Claude-François-Marie Rigoley, Comte d'Ogny
- Movements: 4

Premiere
- Date: 1787
- Location: Paris
- Performers: Concert de la Loge Olympique

The Symphony No. 87 in A major, Hoboken I/87, is the last of the six Paris Symphonies (numbers 82–87) written by Joseph Haydn. It was written in 1786, but performed in 1787 by the Concert de la Loge Olympique, after having been commissioned for performance there by Count d'Ogney in 1785.

== Movements ==
I. Vivace

II. Adagio

III. Menuet e trio

IV. Finale vivace
Performed by Les Arts Florissants

The symphony is scored for flute, two oboes, two bassoons, two horns, and strings.

It is in standard four-movement form:

1. Vivace, 4/4
2. Adagio, 3/4 in D major
3. Menuet e trio, 3/4
4. Finale: Vivace, 2/2

The trio of the Minuet prominently features the solo oboe which rises to a high E.
