= Symphony No. 84 (Haydn) =

Symphony in four movements by Joseph Haydn

- In nomine Domini
- by Joseph Haydn
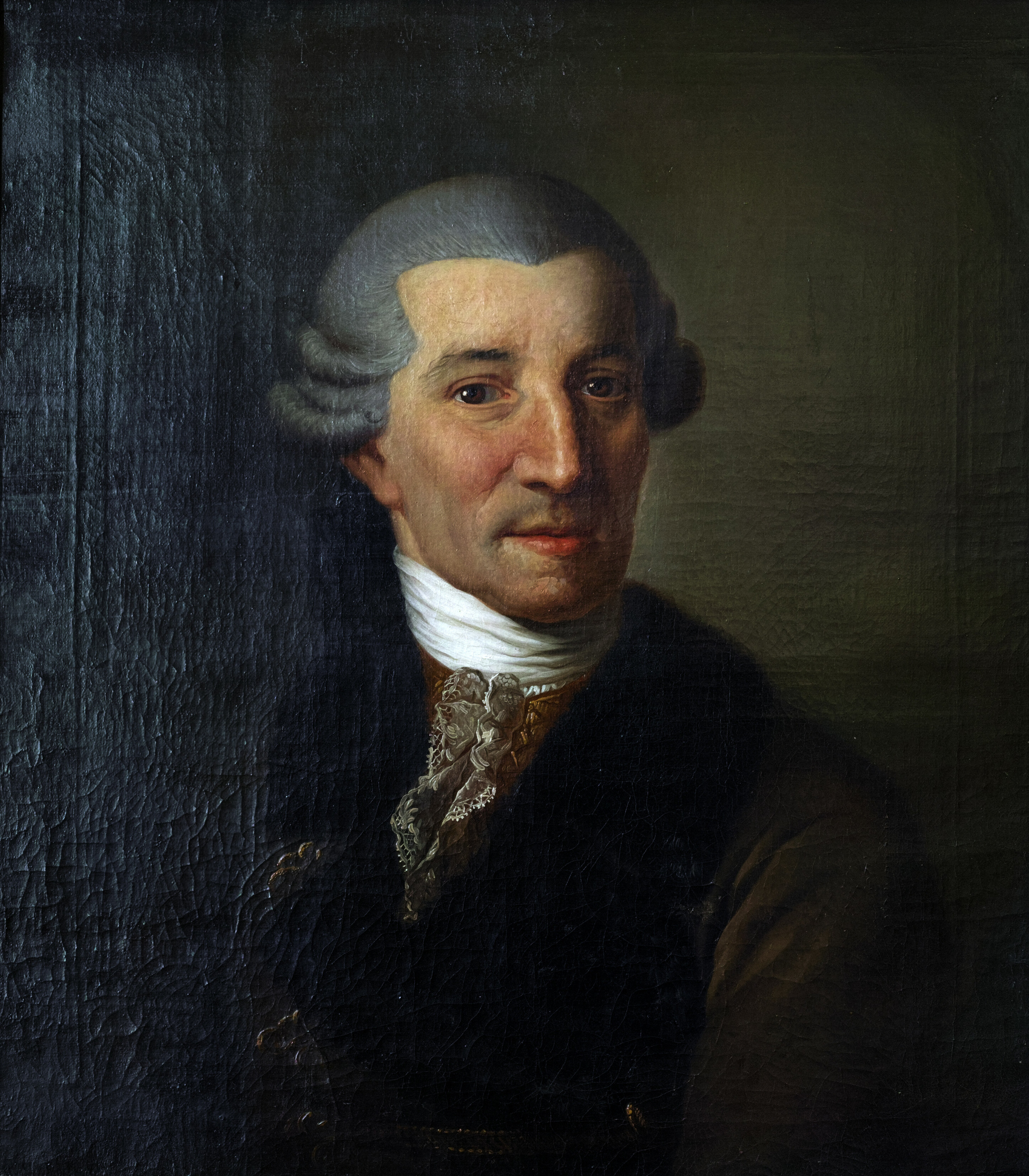
- Haydn at the time he wrote the symphony
- Key: E-flat major
- Catalogue: Hob. I:84
- Composed: 1786
- Dedication: Claude-François-Marie Rigoley, Comte d'Ogny
- Published: Vienna, December 1787
- Publisher: Artaria
- Movements: 4

Premiere
- Date: 1787
- Location: Paris
- Performers: Concert de la Loge Olympique

The Symphony No. 84 in E♭ major, Hoboken I/84, is the third of the six Paris Symphonies (numbers 82–87) written by Joseph Haydn. It is sometimes known by the subtitle In nomine Domini.

The symphony was one of a series of six symphonies commissioned in 1784 by the Concert de la Loge Olympique, a popular concert subscription in Paris (hence the name for the series as a whole). Like the other Paris symphonies, Symphony No. 84 was written for the largest orchestral ensemble that Haydn had written for up until that time, including reinforced woodwind parts and a large string section. Unlike the other Paris symphonies (save No. 87), in No. 84 greater "prominence [is] given to woodwind instruments." Despite its number, the symphony was actually one of the last of the six Paris symphonies to be composed. It was completed in 1786.

== Music ==
The symphony is scored for flute, two oboes, two bassoons, two horns, and strings.

It is in standard four-movement form:

1. Largo — Allegro
2. Andante, 6/8 in B♭ major
3. Menuet e Trio, 3/4
4. Finale: Vivace

The slow second movement is a hybrid between ternary and variation form. The main theme is similar in shape to the introduction to the first movement. After the theme is stated, there is a contrasting passage in the minor which is only loosely based melodically on the main theme. Then two more strophic variations follow, the first lyrical and the second more grand. The movement then segues to a cadenza passage that features the full wind band over pizzicato strings before the full tutti concludes the movement with one last statement of the theme.

== See also ==
- List of symphonies by name
