= Symphony No. 63 (Haydn) =

Symphony by Joseph Haydn, written 1779–1781

- La Roxelane
- by Joseph Haydn
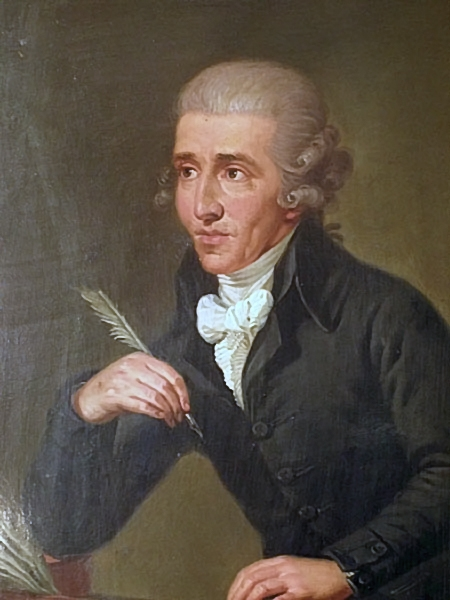
- Portrait of Joseph Haydn, ca. 1770
- Key: C major
- Catalogue: Hob. I:63
- Composed: 1779-81
- Duration: c. 20 minutes
- Movements: 4
- Scoring: Orchestra

The Symphony No. 63 in C major, Hoboken I/63, is a symphony by Joseph Haydn written sometime between 1779 and 1781.

It is often known by the title of the second movement, La Roxelane, named for Roxelana, the influential wife of Suleiman the Magnificent of the Ottoman Empire. This second movement was originally part of Haydn's incidental music for Charles Simon Favart's stage work Soliman der zweite (or Les Trois Sultanes) in which Roxelana was a character.

== Instrumentation ==
There are two versions of this symphony: the so-called "first version" is scored for flute, two oboes, two bassoons, two French horns, two trumpets, timpani, and strings, while the "second version" has the same scoring but with only one bassoon and no trumpets or timpani. Part of the reason for this re-scoring was the departure of bassoonist Ignatz Drobny from Eszterháza, leaving Haydn's orchestra with only one bassoon.

== Movements ==
The two versions are not only differently scored; the third and fourth movements of the two versions are also totally different. The first version of the finale is based on an old fragment from c. 1769–73 and is viewed by some musicologists as a stop-gap to perhaps complete the symphony early to fulfill the need for a performance.

First version

1. Allegro
2. "La Roxelane" Allegretto (o più tosto allegro)
3. Menuetto & Trio
4. Finale: Prestissimo

Second version

3. Menuetto & Trio
4. Finale: Presto.

The first movement is derived from the overture to Haydn's opera Il mondo della luna. This was done by transforming the curtain-raising transitional ending into one that is more cadential, adding the appropriate expositional repeats to conform more to sonata form and transposing one of the overture's two bassoon parts up an octave so that it could be played by the flute. The exposition still retains some of its overture-like feel as the first theme group is in ternary form and it lacks a true second theme, transitioning straight into an expositional coda. In the recapitulation, only the third part of the ternary first theme group is restated.

The "La Roxelane" second movement is in double variation form (ABA_{1}B_{1}A_{2}B_{2}).

The trio of the minuet features solo oboe and solo bassoon playing over pizzicato string accompaniment.

== See also ==
- List of symphonies by name
