= Paris symphonies =

Group of six symphonies by Joseph Haydn

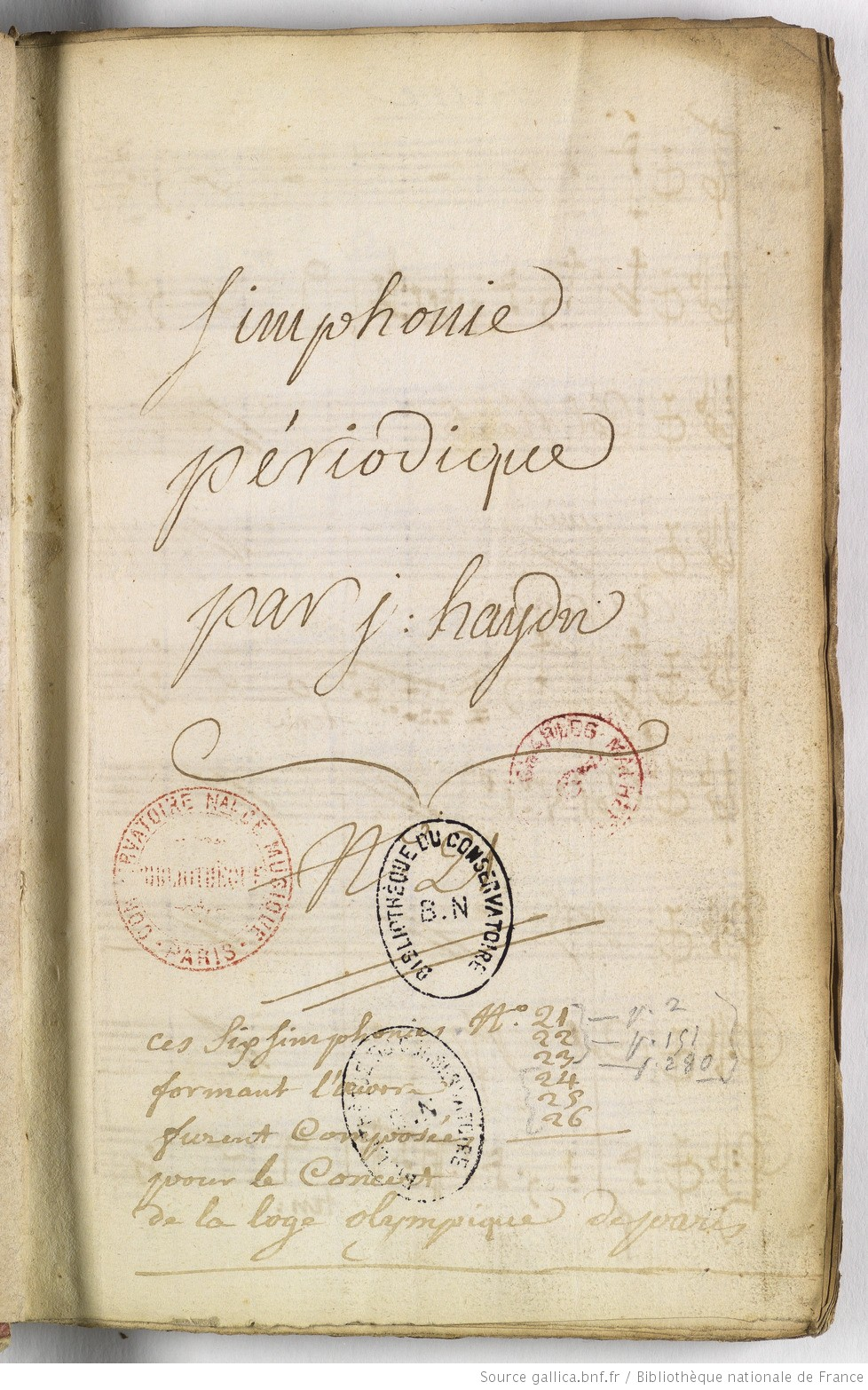
Title page: "ces Six Simphonies N° 21, 22, 23, 24, 25, 26 formant l'œuvre furent composées pour le Concert de la loge olympique de paris"

The Paris symphonies are a group of six symphonies written by Joseph Haydn commissioned by the Count D'Ogny, Grandmaster of the Masonic Loge Olympique. Beginning on 11 January 1786, the symphonies were performed by the Olympique in the Salle des Gardes du Corps of the Tuileries, conducted by Saint-Georges.

== The Symphonies ==
The symphonies are:

- Symphony No. 82 in C major, L'Ours" ("The Bear") (1786)
- Symphony No. 83 in G minor, La Poule ("The Hen") (1785)
- Symphony No. 84 in E♭ major, In Nomine Domini (1786)
- Symphony No. 85 in B♭ major, La Reine ("The Queen") (1785)
- Symphony No. 86 in D major (1786)
- Symphony No. 87 in A major (1785)

== History ==
Parisians had long been familiar with Haydn's symphonies, which were being printed in Paris as early as 1764. H. C. Robbins Landon writes: "All during the early 1780s Haydn's symphonies were performed at the various Parisian concerts with unvarying success, and numerous publishing houses – among them Guera in Lyon, Sieber, Boyer, Le Duc and Imbault in Paris, etc. – issued every new symphonic work by Haydn as soon as they could lay hands on a copy."

The works were composed for a large Parisian orchestra called Le Concert de la loge Olympique (Orchestra of the 'Olympic' (Masonic) Lodge). This organization consisted in part of professionals and in part of skilled amateurs. It included 40 violins and ten double basses, an extraordinary size of orchestra for the time. (Haydn's own ensemble at Eszterháza was never larger than about 25 total.) According to Robbins Landon, "The musicians wore splendid 'sky-blue' dress coats with elaborate lace ruffles, and swords at their sides." They performed in a large theater with boxes in tiers. The performances were patronized by royalty, including Queen Marie Antoinette, who particularly enjoyed the Symphony No. 85, giving rise to its nickname.

The individual responsible for commissioning the symphonies from Haydn was Claude-François-Marie Rigoley, Comte d'Ogny (i.e., Count of Ogny), an aristocrat still in his twenties (his life dates were 1757–1790). The Count, who played in the cello section of the orchestra, was the Intendant Général des Postes (postal service superintendent) and grew up in a very musical household. His father kept a great collection of musical manuscripts, used as the library of the Concert des Amateurs dissolved in 1781, and its successor, the Concert Olympique. Patronage of music may have been an extravagance for the Count, since at his death he left a huge debt of 100,000 livres.

The actual negotiations with Haydn were carried out at Ogny's request by Joseph Bologne the Chevalier de Saint-Georges, celebrated conductor of the Loge Olympique orchestra. Haydn was paid 25 louis d'or for each symphony plus 5 louis for the French publication rights; the sum was apparently very satisfactory from Haydn's point of view, since the lack of copyright laws had generally prevented him from profiting much from his popularity as a composer.

Symphonies 85-87 were republished in Britain soon afterwards, in 1788, by the company Longman & Broderip, rededicated to the Duke of York and given opus number 52.

== Reception ==
According to the composer Giuseppe Maria Cambini, who participated in the orchestra, the finest musicians in Paris performed in the premieres of the symphonies, and received them with "rapture". Edited by Saint-Georges, the symphonies were published in Paris by Sieber. The works were very popular with public and press, and were soon published in London and Vienna. Haydn's very good friend Mozart expressed admiration for them.

The anonymous critic of the Mercure de France particularly praised Haydn's ability to write "monothematic" sonata expositions (as they are now called; see sonata form): "this vast genius, who in each one of his pieces knows how to draw developments so rich and varied from a unique theme (sujet) – very different from those sterile composers who pass continually from one idea to another for lack of knowing how to present one idea in varied forms".

Modern critics also appreciate the works. Robbins Landon calls them "a remarkable fusion of brilliance, elegance, and warmth." Charles Rosen writes "There is not a measure, even the most serious, of these great works which is not marked by Haydn's wit; and his wit has now grown so powerful and so efficient that it has become a sort of passion, a force at once omnivorous and creative."

== See also ==
- List of symphonies by Joseph Haydn

== Notes ==
Sources

- Banat, Gabriel (2006). The Chevalier de Saint-Georges, Virtuoso of the Sword and the Bow. Hillsdale, New York: Pendragon Press.
- Haydn, Joseph (1788). Three symphonies for a grand orchestre ..., op. 52. London: Longman & Broderip. OCLC 223215982.
- Kassler, Michael (2013). Music Entries at Stationers' Hall, 1710–1818. Aldershot: Ashgate. ISBN 9781409493792.
- Quoy-Bodin, J. L. (1786). "L'Orchestre de la Société Olympique en 1786". Revue Musicale (in French). 70 (1). Paris.
- Robbins Landon, H. C. (1963). Joseph Haydn: Critical Edition of the Complete Symphonies. Vienna: Universal Edition.
- Rosen, Charles (1988). Sonata Forms (2nd ed.). Norton.
- Rosen, Charles (1997). The Classical Style: Haydn, Mozart, Beethoven. Norton.
- Thiéry, Luc Vincent (1786). Guide du voyageur à Paris. Vol. I. Paris: Hardouin.
- Webster, James (2001). "Joseph Haydn". New Grove.
