= Ernst Eichner =

German bassoonist and composer

Ernst Dietrich Adolph Eichner [Ernesto Eichner] (15 February 1740 in Arolsen – early 1777 in Potsdam) was a German bassoonist and composer.

== Biography ==
Eichner was born to Johann Andreas Eichner (1694–1768), a court musician to the court of Waldeck. His father provided him with his primary musical education. He became widely known as a virtuoso bassoonist throughout Europe as a result. In 1762, he entered into the service of Duke Christian IV, Count Palatine of Zweibrücken as a violinist. In 1768, he became the concertmaster of the Zweibrücken court orchestra, where he remained until 1772.

He was highly respected by his contemporaries and achieved international recognition as an accomplished composer, bassoonist, and concertmaster during his lifetime. Eichner, however, died young and was quickly forgotten. To musicologists, he is known as a representative of the Mannheim School. His 31 symphonies and 20 concertos comprise the main body of his works, but he also composed chamber music including Six Flute Quartets, Op. 4. In 1772 his compositions were published almost simultaneously in Paris, London, and Amsterdam. Christian Friedrich Daniel Schubart praised Eichner's works in 1784 for their gracious charm and "melting sweetness". His Harp Concerto in D major, Op. 9 is performed to this day.

His daughter was composer Adelheid Maria Eichner.

== Awards ==
- 1772: Second prize in a symphony competition

== Selected works ==
Orchestral

- Six Symphonies, Op. 1 (1770)
- Trois Symphonies à huit parties, Op. 5 (1772)
- Trois Symphonies à huit parties obligées, Op. 6 (1772)
- Six Symphonies à huit parties obligées, Op. 7 (1772)
- Six Symphonies à huit parties, Op. 10 (1775)
- Six Symphonies à grand orchestre, Op. 11 (1776)

Concertante

- Concerto No. 1 for oboe and orchestra in B♭ major (1764)
- Concerto No. 2 for oboe and orchestra in D major (1770)
- Concerto No. 1 for harp/piano and orchestra in C major (1771), also printed as Concerto for harpsichord and orchestra, Op. 6 (1777)
- Concerto No. 2 for harp/piano and orchestra in D major, Op. 9 (1771)
- Concerto No. 1 for bassoon and orchestra in C major (c.1771)
- Concerto No. 3 for oboe and orchestra in C major (1772)
- Concerto No. 2 for bassoon and orchestra in C major (1772)
- Concerto No. 3 for bassoon and orchestra in C major (1778)
- Concerto No. 4 for oboe and orchestra in B♭ major (c.1779)
- Concerto No. 4 for bassoon and orchestra in E♭ major (1781)
- Concerto No. 5 for bassoon and orchestra in B♭ major (1782)
- Concerto No. 6 for bassoon and orchestra in D major (1783)

Chamber music

- Sechs Quartette (6 Quartets) for flute, violin, viola and cello, Op. 4
- Sechs Duette (6 Duets) for violin and viola, Op. 10
- Sechs Quartette (6 Quartets) for violin, viola, cello and double bass, Op. 12

== Recordings ==
- Sonata in C minor for harpsichord (from Op. 9), performed by Rainer Kussmaul, on: RBM 463 193, CD (2001).
- Six Flute Quartets, Op. 4, performed by Jan de Winne (flute), Ensemble Il Gardelino, on: Accent ACC 24183, CD (2006).
- Oboe Concerto No. 3 in C major, performed by Kurt Meier (oboe), Northern Sinfonia, Howard Griffiths (cond.), on: Pan Classics PAN 510 088, CD (2007).
- Harp Concertos, Op. 6 and 9; performed by Silke Aichhorn (harp), Kurpfälzisches Kammerorchester, Stefan Fraas (cond.), on: cpo 777 835-2, CD (2013).
- Symphonies – Theresa Orchestra, Vanni Moretto (cond.), on CPO 555 580-2
