= Sébastien Demar =

German pianist, composer, conductor, teacher and organist (1763-1832)

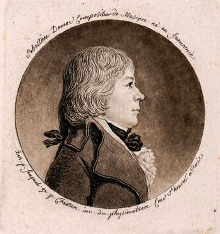
Sébastien Demar, after Jean Fouquet. 1795

Jakob-Ignaz-Sebastian Demar (29 June 1763 – 25 July 1832) (often wrongly called Jean-Sébastien Demar or much more recently Jacques-Sébastien) was a German pianist, composer, conductor, music teacher and organist.

== Biography ==
Born in the vicinity of Gauaschach, now part of Hammelburg, district of Bad Kissingen in Lower Franconia, Holy Roman Empire, on 29 June 1763, he died in Orléans, on 25 July 1832. He was the son of music teacher Sebastien Demar and his wife Dorothée Zugis.

Born into a family of musicians, he was first trained at the Strasbourg Cathedral by the Kapellmeister and composer Franz Xaver Richter, representative (in the same way as Johann Stamitz) of the Mannheim School. Then he became organist in Wissembourg, (Alsace). He also traveled to Vienna (Austria) to further his studies in the field of composition, with Joseph Haydn. He arrived in Paris in 1788 and settled in Orléans in 1789, shortly before the Revolution. Demar did a lot for music in the city, where he first directed the music of the 88th Regiment (he was in place on 23 December 1791), then of the National Guard. In 1799, he was appointed by the municipality to play the organ as an amateur at Republican festivals, in the various "temples" (the old churches) where they were held: the plain-song gave way to the "war song".

At the beginning of the 19th century (1802?), Demar became "master of [pianoforte]" in the Maison d'éducation de Mme Robillard, in Orléans. In 1806, he created the Société des Concerts par Abonnement. Following the course of history, he was also organist of Saint-Paterne's church from 1815... In this context he was able to train "choir children" (boys singing in the professional choir) in the technique of the pianoforte and the organ.

He left many interesting works, often instrumental. He is the author, among others, of several concertos for forte-piano, including a "hunting concerto", a Cossack concerto, a concerto dedicated to the Empress Marie-Louise.

He transcribed for harp one of his violin concertos so that it could be performed by his daughter Theresia in a public concert in Paris.

== Compositions ==
- Clarinet Concerto in E-flat major, 6 Clarinet Duos
- Grande Méthode pour le Forte Piano
- Horn Concerto in D major
- Méthode abrégée pour le violon
- Nouvelle méthode pour la clarinette
- Piano Concerto 'Cosaque' in B minor, Op.48
- Recueil d'airs pour 2 flageolets
- Trio concertant in F major, Op.40
- Violin Concerto in D major, Op.32, 40 Violin Duos d'airs choisis

== Family ==
His daughter, Thérésia-Elisabeth-Françoise Demar (Theresia Demar) married Jean-Nicolas Gannal, pharmacist, chemist and inventor of modern embalming. She herself was a harpist, composer and music teacher. We also know that she was singing. She lived several years in Paris and finally ended her life in Orléans. She died in this city on January 18, 1858, at 71 years of age. She left more than thirty musical compositions, which were published at the time. They are kept at the BnF essentially. Her cantata Sainte-Cécile (éd. Orléans, Gatineau, 1851) had been written on the words of the Orléans historian and bibliophile Jean Michel Constant Leber.

Demar was born in Gernsbach (Duchy of Baden) 30 October 1786. Her death certificate indicates that she was the daughter of "Jacob-Ignace-Sébastien Demar, music teacher, and of Dame Elisabeth Riesam". Other erroneous sources, give her birth in Paris in 1788.

== Bibliography ==
- Hervé Audéon, Demar (Johann-Sebastian), in Dictionnaire de la musique en France au XIXe (ed. Joël-Marie Fauquet, Paris, Fayard, 2003).
- Id., Catalogue des concertos pour pianos édités pour la première fois à Paris entre 1795 et 1815, June 1999. Catalogue published on the database Philidor of the Centre de Musique Baroque de Versailles, November 2003, 54 p. (p. 15-17: Démar [Jacques-Ignace-]Sébastien, 3 concertos).
- François Turellier, Les orgues et les organistes de la cathédrale Sainte-Croix d’Orléans. Leur place à l’église et dans la ville, des origines jusqu’aux travaux d’Aristide Cavaillé-Coll, in L’Orgue, Quarterly review published by the Association des Amis de l'Orgue in co-publication with Symétrie, No. 291, Versailles, Lyon, 2010-III, p. 3–33 (p. 23–24).
