= Symphony No. 83 (Haydn) =

Symphony by Joseph Haydn, popularly known as "The Hen"

- The Hen or La Poule
- by Joseph Haydn
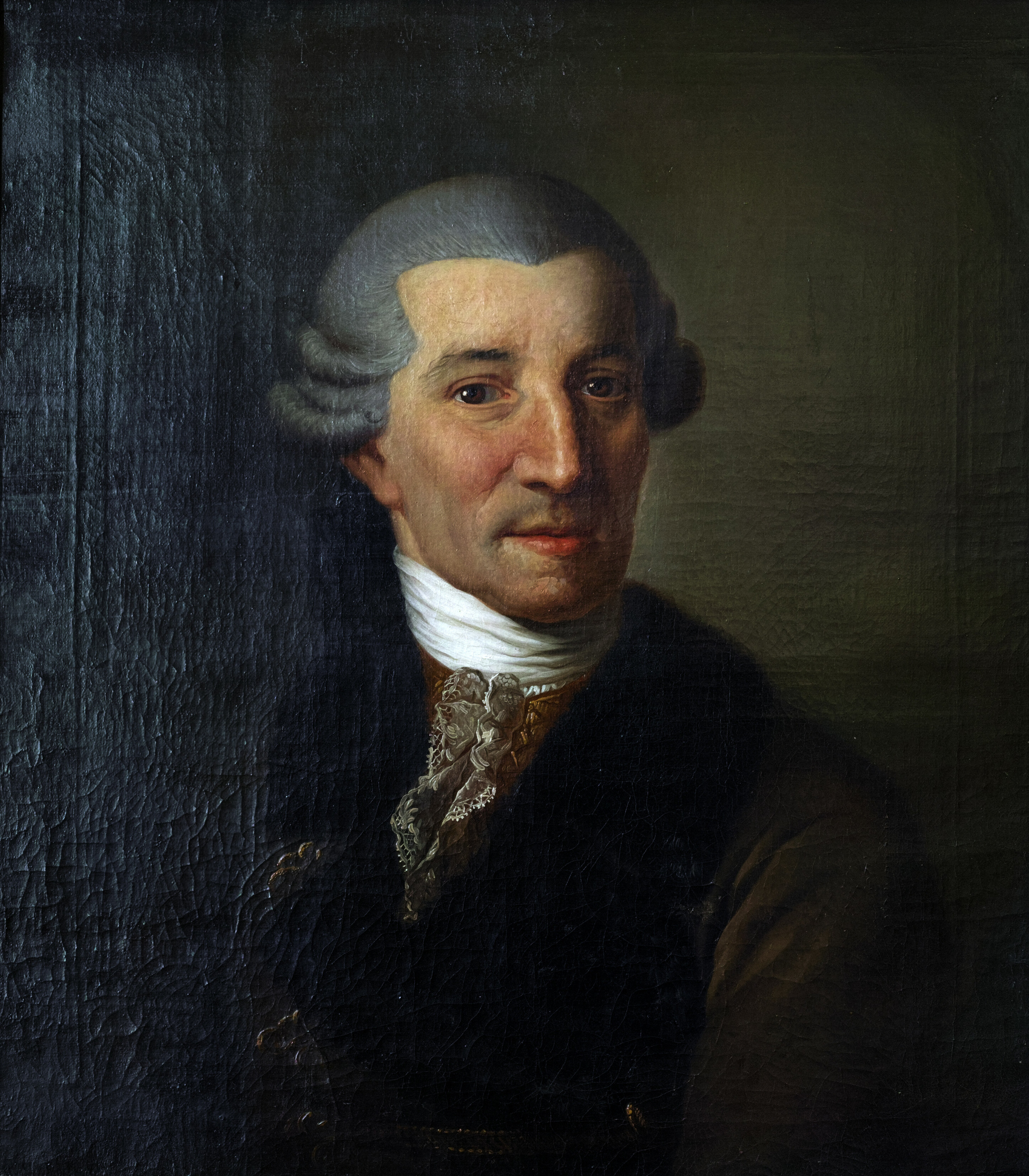
- Haydn at the time he wrote the symphony
- Key: G minor
- Catalogue: Hob. I:83
- Composed: 1785
- Published: Vienna, December 1787
- Publisher: Artaria
- Movements: 4

Symphony No. 83 in G minor, Hoboken I/83, is the second of the six Paris Symphonies (numbers 82–87) written by Joseph Haydn in 1785. It was published by Artaria in Vienna in December 1787.

It is popularly known as the Hen Symphony (French: La poule), from which the nickname comes from the clucking second subject in the first movement, which reminded listeners of the jerky back-and-forth head motion of a walking hen.

== Music ==
The symphony is scored for flute, two oboes, two bassoons, two horns and strings.

It is in standard four-movement form:

1. Allegro spiritoso, 4/4
2. Andante, 3/4 in E♭ major
3. Menuet: Allegretto – Trio, 3/4 in G major
4. Finale: Vivace, 12/8 in G major

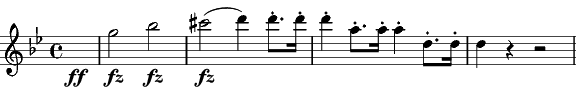

The symphony opens in stormy G minor with the minor triad further intensified by the added dissonance of the C♯. The dotted rhythms that answer are transformed into fanfares later in the first theme group of the sonata form movement.

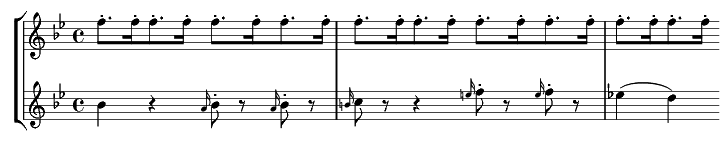

The second theme in B♭ major features dotted repeated notes in a solo oboe against jerky acciaccaturas in the first violins. This is the "Hen" motif that gives the symphony its nickname, although it is also related to the dotted rhythm response in the first theme. The development features the exploration of the two themes in different keys. It opens with the first theme in C minor, followed by the second theme in E♭ major and F minor. The first theme is then heard contrapuntally leading towards the dominant allowing for a retransition to the tonic for the recapitulation. The first theme is recapitulated in G minor while the second theme is recapitulated in G major.

== See also ==
- List of symphonies by name
