= Philip K. Eichner =

Philip K. Eichner, S.M., was an American educator, Marianist priest and Catholic activist. He chaired the Board of Directors of the Catholic League for Religious and Civil Rights from 1992 to 2016, and he has been president of three Catholic schools on Long Island.

Eichner was a successful respondent in Eichner v. Denis Dillon, a case before the New York Court of Appeals which helped to establish the rights of patients and their proxies to decline extraordinary means of life support.

== Educational leadership ==
Eichner graduated from Chaminade High School in Mineola, New York, in 1953. He received his undergraduate degree at the University of Dayton and his graduate degree in theology from the University of Fribourg, in Switzerland, and he was ordained in 1966, From 1967 to 1992 he served as president of his high school alma mater, Chaminade. He was also leader of the Meribah Province—the religious community of brothers who teach at Chaminade. This community separated from the Marianist's New York Province during the 1970s “because of deep differences concerning ministry and the role of the school apostolate”. The Meribah Province assumed responsibility for a second school, Kellenberg Memorial High School, in 1987, with Eichner as president. Eichner is the President of Kellenberg and of St. Martin de Porres Marianist School, the Meribah Province's third and final school.

While President of Chaminade, Eichner established an endowment drive called the Torch Fund, to defray the costs of tuition. He thus helped initiate a trend among Catholic schools towards raising endowments and limiting tuition.

== Educational, religious and social stances ==
Eichner has taken stands on several educational, religious and social issues and controversies.

One such issue is a terminal patient's right to refuse "extraordinary means" of life support, or to have them refused on his or her behalf. In 1980, Eichner petitioned the New York State Court of Appeals, in Eichner v. Denis Dillon, to allow removal of a respirator keeping Brother Joseph C. Fox alive. Fox, an 88-year-old member of the religious community that Eichner led, had fallen into a coma after a cardiac arrest that occurred during a hernia operation. In the wake of the Karen Ann Quinlan case, Fox had expressed his strong desire not to be kept alive by extraordinary means, according to Eichner and other Marianist brothers at Chaminade. The court appointed Eichner “committee of the person of Brother Fox” and authorized him to have the respirator removed. He did so, and on January 24, 1980, Fox died of congestive heart failure.

Another issue on which Eichner has spoken out is “financial decadence,” particularly in Long Island “prom culture.” In 2006, after Kellenberg discontinued the senior prom, Eichner and Kellenberg Principal Kenneth Hoagland, S.M., wrote parents to say that the prom had become synonymous with “flaunting of affluence, assuming exaggerated expenses, a pursuit of vanity for vanity's sake.” The letter was published on the Chicago Tribune op-ed page and received national attention.

Eichner has also received attention for positions he has taken as chairman of the Board of Directors of the Catholic League, though League President Bill Donohue is the organization's more outspoken and controversial leader. Eichner has spoken for the League on two matters related to Catholic-Jewish relations. First, in 2004, when accusations of anti-Semitism were raised against Mel Gibson’s The Passion of the Christ, Eichner was a strong public supporter of the film. Eichner called the film “a meditation on our own inhumanity to each other and how this doesn't destroy God's love," and he endorsed a two-mile walk by 1,000 Kellenberg upperclassmen to see the movie on Ash Wednesday. Second, Eichner defended a reference to the “conversion of Jews” in the traditional Latin liturgy for Good Friday Mass. He called this a matter not of anti-Semitism, but of concern; "we would say,” he explained, that “everyone who doesn't see Jesus is living in a certain amount of darkness, and we want them to see the light."

Similarly, Eichner has suggested that fundamentalist Christians are limited in their religious perspective. He made this point when a Kellenberg junior was barred from returning for her senior year after her evangelical family had clashed with the school over several religious issues. Her dismissal came after she refused to sing as a choir member in Jesus Christ, Superstar; she objected that one of the songs “only speaks of Jesus' humanity; it does not mention his divinity." Eichner asserted that the school had a right to expect students to respect its religious beliefs and practices. He maintained that “We are Catholic in the true sense of the term. We are not rightist or fundamentalist. We would find their version of Christianity to be narrow and fundamentalist, and we are not a fundamentalist school."

On August 5, 1988, Eichner was an impromptu guest on Late Night with David Letterman. During the broadcast, Letterman and guest Don Rickles conducted remote camera interviews with people in the lobby of the Loews Summit hotel, one of whom was Eichner. Rickles said to Eichner, "My best friend Bob Newhart is an Irish Catholic and when he comes to church he loves to hit the bell," to laughs from the audience. Rickles followed with, "You know what's funny, I think the priest bought it. The father went, 'Yeah, hit the bell!'"
