= Zofia Dmuszewska =

Polish stage actor and opera singer

Zofia Dmuszewska (1785–1807) was a Polish stage actress and opera singer.

She was born to the actor August Petrascha and married in 1805 to her colleague Louis Adam Dmuszewski. She was engaged at the National Theatre, Warsaw, from 1801 until 1807, where she became hugely popular and referred to as the greatest opera female star in Poland of her generation. She was active as an actor as well as an opera singer which was common at the time, and she is described as a capable actor, but it was as an opera singer she became most famed. She performed to Napoleon I in 1807.
