= Adelheid Maria Eichner =

German composer, singer and pianist (1762–1787)

- Born: 1762
- Died: 1787 (aged 24–25)
- Occupations: Composer, singer and pianist
- Parents: Ernst Eichner (father); Maria Magdalena Ritter (mother)

Adelheid Maria Eichner (1762–1787) was a German composer, singer and pianist who was noted during her brief lifetime for her fine three-octave singing voice and vocal technique. She was the only child of bassoonist and composer Ernst Eichner and his wife, Maria Magdalena Ritter. Critics claim her compositions to be more effective instrumentally than vocally. As a composer, Adelheid Eichner had difficulty combining words and music effectively.

== Early years ==
Adelheid Eichner grew up in Zweibrücken, in the homonymous state. Her father, Ernst Eichner, was employed in the Hofkapelle of Duke Christian IV of Zweibrücken-Birkenfeld from autumn 1762 to November 1772. She was taught singing in Mannheim by an elderly Italian castrato of a good school while it is thought her father taught her the piano. At the end of 1773 she and her mother joined her father in Potsdam, in the Kingdom of Prussia. He had travelled to Paris and London to give concerts and had begun his employment in the Hofkapelle of the Prince Frederick William in August 1773.

== Career ==
From 1773, Adelheid was employed in the Hofkapelle, with her father, as the only German woman singer. She appeared in public concerts in Berlin as the prince's Kammersängerin ("chamber singer") from 1777 and from 1781, at the Berlin Royal Opera. She became a permanent member of the opera from 1782 and sang leading roles in opera seria performances.

Adelheid Eichner first came to prominence as a composer in 1780, when her 12 Lieder mit Melodien fürs Clavier was published in Potsdam. This collection is her only surviving work, and includes one of the earliest Goethe songs, a setting of Jägers Nachtlied. Although highly expressive, the songs are conceived in instrumental terms, with little regard for the natural melody of their texts. Further individual songs were printed in musical almanacs until 1792. Eichner set poems by G. A. Bürger and J. D. Overbeck, as well as those of the Dutch General von Stamford, who from about 1775 until 1786 was a tutor at the Prince of Prussia's court and according to Zelter, was engaged to her.

== Works ==
Selected works include:

- 2 Lieder mit Melodien fürs Clavier (1780)
- Ich hatt' ein kleines Lammchen nur (1783)
- Mach mir vom Volk (1781–82)
- An die Träume
- Lied eines Mädchens

== Critical response ==
Eichner received considerable acclaim for her vocal technique throughout her three-octave range. The Freiburg Musikalisches Taschenbuch of 1784 praised her piano playing, claiming that she performed "with the same ease and skill [with which she sings] and particularly with regard to matters of taste in performance, her sensitive father's spirit seems to rest on her".

As a composer, Adelheid Eichner received criticism for her the setting of her words to music. Critics argue her compositions are more effective instrumentally than vocally.
