= Double variation =

Structural Musical Form

The double variation (also known as alternating variations) is a musical form used in classical music. It is a type of theme and variations that employs two themes. In a double variation set, a first theme (to be called A here) is followed by a second theme (B), followed by a variation on A, then a variation on B, and so on with alternating A and B variations. Often there is a coda at the end.

The double variation is strongly associated with the composer Joseph Haydn, who wrote many such movements during his career. Later Ludwig van Beethoven sometimes used this form more loosely, often in slower movements. The form was occasionally used by subsequent Romantic-era composers.

== The double variation in Haydn ==
The double variation first appears in Haydn's work of the 1770s. Haydn may have been inspired by an earlier example of Carl Philipp Emanuel Bach, the sixth of that composer's Sonatas with Varied Reprises, (W. 50/6, H. 140), in C minor (1760). Elaine Sisman, an authority on variations, notes "This set of sonatas was advertised in Vienna several times in the period in which Haydn wrote his first [double] variations."

While Haydn's double variations show considerable diversity, there are some general patterns.

- Both themes have the same tonic, but in opposite modes, so that if A is major, B is minor, and vice versa.
- The second theme is usually thematically reminiscent of the first, though not so close as to be an actual variation of it.
- The total number of variations is small, often just one or two for each theme.
- The number of variations is (with just one exception) arranged to place the major theme last. Thus, if the first theme is major, Haydn generally uses ABABA form, but if the first theme is minor, Haydn uses ABABAB.

As Haydn's career proceeded, he moved toward a very particular type of double variations, having the following additional specific characteristics.

- The tempo is moderate, typically andante.
- The minor theme is placed first.
- Each theme is divided into two sections, and each section is repeated.
- The internal arrangement of both themes is often that of sonata form, with the music moving to the dominant or relative major key in the first part, to remote keys in the first half of the second part, and then to a recapitulation of the opening material in the tonic key. This observation is made by Charles Rosen (in The Classical Style) concerning the double variations in the Drumroll Symphony; it holds true in several other cases as well.
- While assessments of emotional content are necessarily subjective, it is reasonable to claim that the minor themes sound tense and the major themes blissful. Jean-Yves Bras, writing in program notes for a performance of the Piano Trio H:23 (Harmonia Mundi 901400), describes the minor and major themes as "somber" and "radiant", respectively. For Richard Wigmore, the minor theme of the "Razor" Quartet is "astringent", the major theme again "radiant". Charles Rosen, writing of the major theme from the Piano Trio H. 13, says that in it Haydn created "an emotion that was completely his own and that no other composer, not even Mozart, could duplicate – a feeling of ecstasy that is completely unsensual, almost amiable."

=== List of works by Haydn written in double variation form ===
According to Sisman, Haydn wrote 21 double variation movements. Sisman's list is restated below in chronological order. Where different authorities provide different dates, both are given; NG = the New Grove (used by Sisman), MH = Maurice Hinson's edition of the piano sonatas. For the keys of the A and B sections, lower case designates minor; upper case major. The structural synopses are taken from Sisman with minor corrections; in Sisman's notation an asterisk means "altered".

| Year | Work | Form | A | B |
|---|---|---|---|---|
| 1770–75? (ES); before 1780 (MH) | Piano sonata H. XVI:36. 2: Scherzando | ABA_{1}B_{1}A_{2}coda | A | a |
| 1771-3 (ES); ca. 1768–1770? (MH) | Piano sonata H. XVI:44. 2: Allegretto | ABA_{1}B_{1}; a minuet | g | G |
| before 1778 (ES); 1771–1773? (MH) | Piano sonata H. XVI:33. Finale: Tempo di Minuet | ABA_{1}B_{1}A_{2}; a minuet | D | d |
| before 1778 (ES); 1773 (MH) | Piano sonata H. XVI:22. Finale: Tempo di Minuet | ABA_{1}B_{1}A_{2}; a minuet | E | e |
| 1778/79 | Symphony No. 53, "L'Impériale". 2: Andante | ABA_{1}B_{1}A_{2}A_{3} | A | a |
| 1778/79 | Symphony No. 70, 2: Specie d'un canone in contrapunto doppio: Andante | ABA_{1}B_{1}A_{2}. | d | D |
| 1779 | Symphony No. 63, "La Roxelane". 2: Allegretto (O piu tosto allegro) | ABA_{1}B_{1}A_{2}*B_{2}* | c | C |
| 1781 | String quartet Op. 33, No. 6. 4: Allegretto | ABA_{1}B_{1}A_{2} | D | d |
| before 1784 | Piano sonata H. XVI:34. 3: Vivace molto | ABA_{1}*B_{1}A_{2}. First variation in A is lengthened by a reprise of the initial section. | e | E |
| 1784 | Piano sonata H. XVI:40. 1: Allegro innocente | ABA_{1}B_{1}A_{2}. In the following movement, in ternary (ABA) form, the A sections form yet two more variations of the A theme of the opening movement. | G | g |
| 1786 | Symphony No. 82. 2: Allegretto | ABA_{1}B_{1}A_{2}coda | F | f |
| 1787 | String quartet Op. 50, No. 4. 2: Andante | ABA_{1}B_{1}A_{2} | A | a |
| 1788 | Symphony No. 90. 2: Andante | ABA_{1}B_{1}A_{2}coda | F | f |
| 1788 | String quartet Op. 55, No. 2, "The Razor". 1: Andante più tosto Allegretto | ABA_{1}B_{1}A_{2}B_{2} | f | F |
| 1789 | Piano sonata H. XVI:48. 1: Andante con espressione | ABA_{1}B_{1}A_{2} | C | c |
| 1789 | Piano trio H. XV:13 in C minor. 1: Andante | ABA_{1}B_{1}A_{2}B_{2} | c | C |
| 1793 | Variations for solo piano in F minor, H. XVII:6. Andante | ABA_{1}B_{1}A_{2}B_{2}A* with extensive coda. This work is widely admired by commentators; Sisman calls it the "most profound" of all of Haydn's alternating variations. | f | F |
| 1793 | String quartet Op. 71, No. 3. 2: Andante con moto | ABAA_{1}B_{1}A_{2}coda | B♭ | b♭ |
| 1794 | Piano trio H. XV:19 in G minor. 1: Andante | ABA_{1}B_{1} followed by a second quasi-variation on B in Presto tempo, expanded to full sonata form. For discussion of this expansion, see Rosen (1997:83–88). | g | G |
| 1795 | Piano trio H. XV:23 in D minor. 1: Andante molto | ABA_{1}B_{1}A_{2}B_{2} with coda | d | D |
| 1795 | Symphony No. 103, "The Drumroll". 2: Andante più tosto Allegretto | ABA_{1}B_{1}A_{2}B_{2} form, with a long coda based on B. The themes are said to be based on Croatian folk tunes. | c | C |

== The double variation in Beethoven ==
Although the double variation is associated strongly with Haydn, Elaine Sisman has pointed out that, provided we adopt a somewhat looser definition of the form, Ludwig van Beethoven also emerges as a major composer of double variations. With the partial exception of the Piano Trio in E flat major, Op. 70 No. 2, which Sisman sees as an homage to Haydn, Beethoven's double variations have a rather different character. For instance, sometimes only the A theme is strongly varied, with B remaining relatively constant. Beethoven also likes to interrupt or truncate one or both themes, producing a less regular structure than Haydn's, seen in the often-complex structural formulae given below.

Thus flexibly construed, the double variation emerges as the musical form for some of the most famous of Beethoven's works. Here is a list of movements for which Sisman argues that a double-variation structure is present.

| Year | Work | Form | A | B |
|---|---|---|---|---|
| 1802 | Third Symphony. 4: Allegro molto | Intro-A-A_{1-}A_{2-}B-A_{x-}B_{1-}A_{3-}B_{2-}A_{x1-}B_{3-}B_{4-}coda | various, centered on E♭ | various, centered on E♭ |
| 1808 | Fifth Symphony. 2: Andante con moto | A-B-A_{1-}B_{1-}A_{2-}cadenza on A-B_{2-}A_{3-}A_{4-}coda based on A | A♭/once in A♭ minor | A♭-C, A♭-C, C |
| 1808 | Piano Trio Op. 70, No. 2. 2: Allegretto | A-A_{1-}B-A_{2-}B_{1} with coda | C | c |
| 1812 | Seventh Symphony. 2: Allegretto | Intro(1 chord)-A-A_{1-}A_{2-}A_{3-}B-A_{4}-A_{5}-B_{1}-coda | a | A to C, A |
| 1824 | Ninth Symphony. 3: Adagio molto e cantabile | A-B-A_{1-}B_{1}-A_{2-}A_{3}-coda | B♭/once in E♭ | D, then G |
| 1825 | String Quartet No. 15, Op. 132. 3: Molto Adagio — Andante ("Heiliger Dankgesang") | A-B-A_{1}B_{1}A_{2} | F Lydian, notated C | D |

As Sisman notes, Beethoven placed his double variations in the same genres as Haydn: the piano trio, the string quartet, and the symphony.

== Later double variations ==
After Beethoven, the double variation appears to have been only seldom employed. The following list is ordered chronologically.

- The second movement of Johannes Brahms' String Quintet No. 1 (1882) is described by Joanna Wyld as a set of double variations.
- The second movement of Anton Bruckner's Seventh Symphony (1883/1885) is described by A. Peter Brown as a set of double variations.
- The Larghetto movement of Antonín Dvořák's String Quintet Op. 97 (1893) is described by Colin Lawson as a set of double variations.

== Other senses of the term "double variation" ==
=== Distinct variations for repeated sections ===
Occasionally, authors on music use the term "double variation" with a different meaning. This definition presupposes that the theme consists of two parts, each one repeated (that is, AABB). In a double variations of this kind, each repeat gets its own variation, as shown below:

AABB A_{1}A_{2}B_{1}B_{2} A_{3}A_{4}B_{3}B_{4} ...

Alternatively, some of the variations can be single (A_{x}A_{x}B_{x}B_{x}) and others double.

An example of this usage is found in Cedric T. Davie's discussion of the last movement of Beethoven's Piano Sonata Opus 109, in which some but not all of the variations are double in the intended sense. The full formula for this movement (adapting Davie's verbal description) is:

Theme: AABB
I. A_{1}A_{1}B_{1}B_{1}
II. A_{2}A_{3}B_{2}B_{3}
III. A_{3}A_{4}B_{3}B_{4}
IV. A_{5}A_{5}B_{5}B_{5}
V. A_{6}A_{7}B_{6}B_{7}
VI. A_{8}A_{9}B_{8}B_{9}
Coda, incorporating the original AABB

The two kinds of "double variation" are not mutually exclusive. In Haydn's Piano Trio H:13, the first movement is a double variations in the first sense given in this article (that is, it takes the form ABA_{1}B_{1}A_{2}B_{2}), and the last variation of the B theme (B_{2}) is a double variation in the second sense, with different treatment of the repeats in each half of the theme. There appears to be no standard nomenclature for keeping the two senses distinct.

=== "Double" as designating a single variation ===
In the Baroque dance suite, a dance movement was sometimes immediately followed by a single variation, which was called the "double". A widely known example is the first partita from Johann Sebastian Bach's sonatas and partitas for solo violin where each of the four dance movements is followed by a double that elaborates on the bass-line of the previous piece.
