= Claude-François-Marie Rigoley =

French nobleman

Claude-François Rigoley
- Count of Ogny
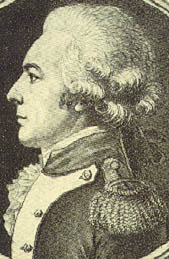
- Portrait of the Comte d'Ogny in uniform of the commander of the National Guard, ca. 1790
- Born: 9 January 1756; Dijon, France
- Died: 7 October 1790 (aged 34); Paris, France
- Spouse: Flore-Louise Ménage de Pressigny
- Father: Claude-Jean Rigoley, Baron of Ogny
- Mother: Élisabeth d’Alencé

Claude-François-Marie Rigoley, comte d'Ogny (9 January 1756 – 3 October 1790) was a French nobleman, military officer, patron of the arts, Freemason, and founder of the Concert de la Loge Olympique.

== Early life ==
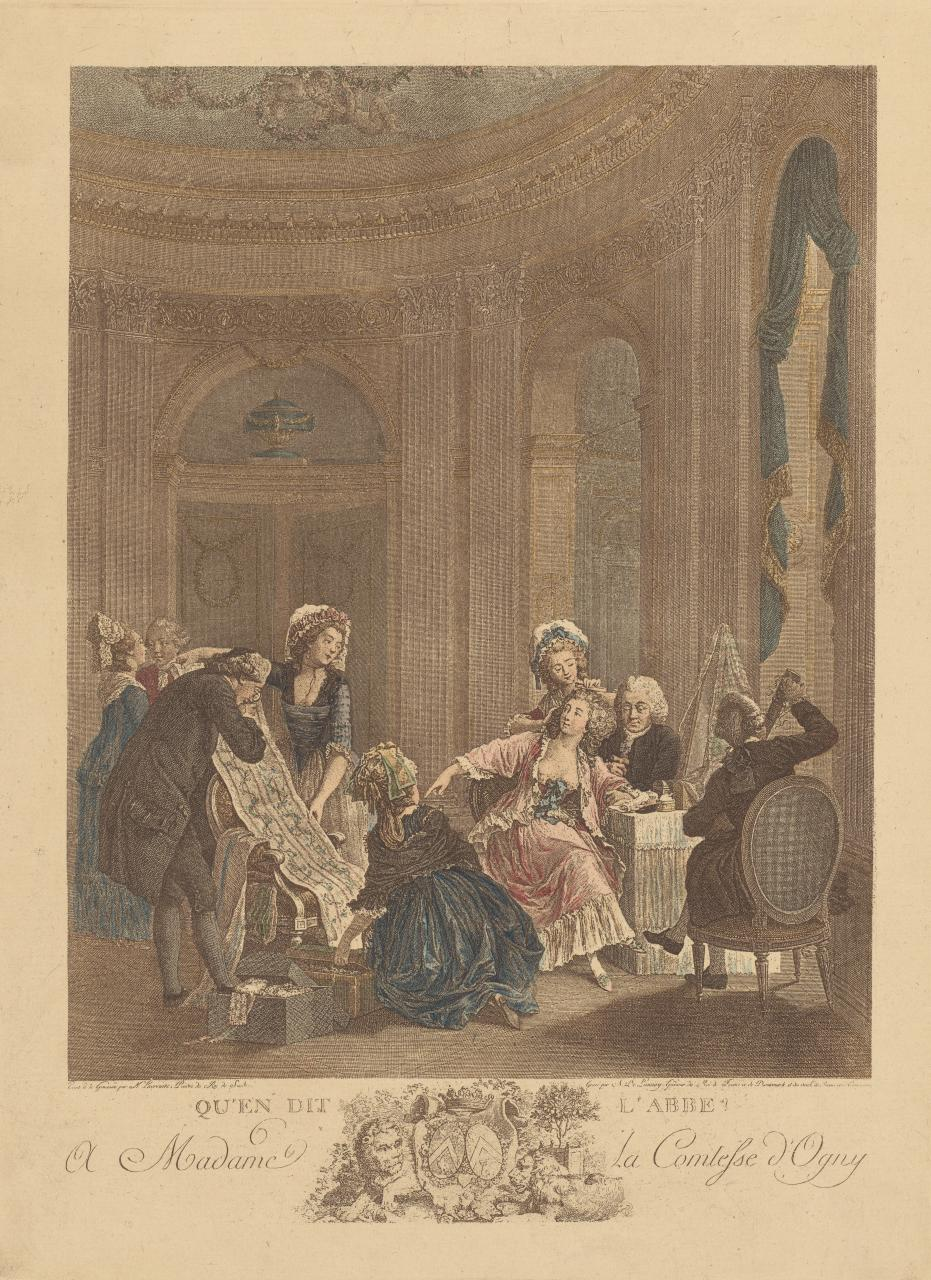
Engraving of the Comtesse d'Ogny by Nicolas Delaunay

Claude-François was born in Dijon to Claude-Jean Rigoley, baron d'Ogny and Élisabeth d'Alencé. His father served as General Intendant of the Posts under both Louis XV and Louis XVI.

The Comte d'Ogny distinguished himself within the Strasbourg Regiment of Artillery in 1770, and attained the rank of captain in the regiment of the Jarnac Dragoons in 1774, later retiring from military service on 1 November 1779 with a pension of 885 livres. On 25 January 1780, he was appointed Intendant général du poste et des coursiers de France by Louis XVI, alongside his father.

On 13 February 1786, he married Flore-Louise Ménage de Pressigny, daughter of the eponymous fermier général.

== French Revolution ==
On 16 July 1789, after the Storming of the Bastille, his father took refuge in his château de Millemont, leaving the Comte d'Ogny alone at the head of the Post Office administration. This was reorganized in June 1790 by a series of decrees of the National Assembly, which nevertheless kept him in office as the result of a letter from Jacques Necker, dated 10 August 1790, informing the Comte d'Ogny that "His Majesty by virtue of the decree of the National Assembly had committed him to exercise the functions of the former Intendant of the Posts."

He was associated with Lafayette and the events of 5 and 6 October 1789, in which, according to Antoine-Charles Tardieu, marquis de Maleissye, "it is M. d'Ogny, the son of the Superintendent of Posts, to whom the unfortunate Louis owed to not always had at his door the two heads of his unfortunate bodyguards "

During the brief period while directing the post office alone, Rigoley secretly assured the security and regularity of correspondence between the King and the royal family, within the province and abroad, while they were detained at the Tuileries Palace under surveillance of the National Guard. These facts were discovered at the time of the trial of Louis XVI and recorded as incriminating evidence in the Valazé Report. In a letter to Mirabeau, Marie Antoinette wrote, during the summer of 1790, "M. d'Ogny is a reliable and faithful man".

== Musical career ==
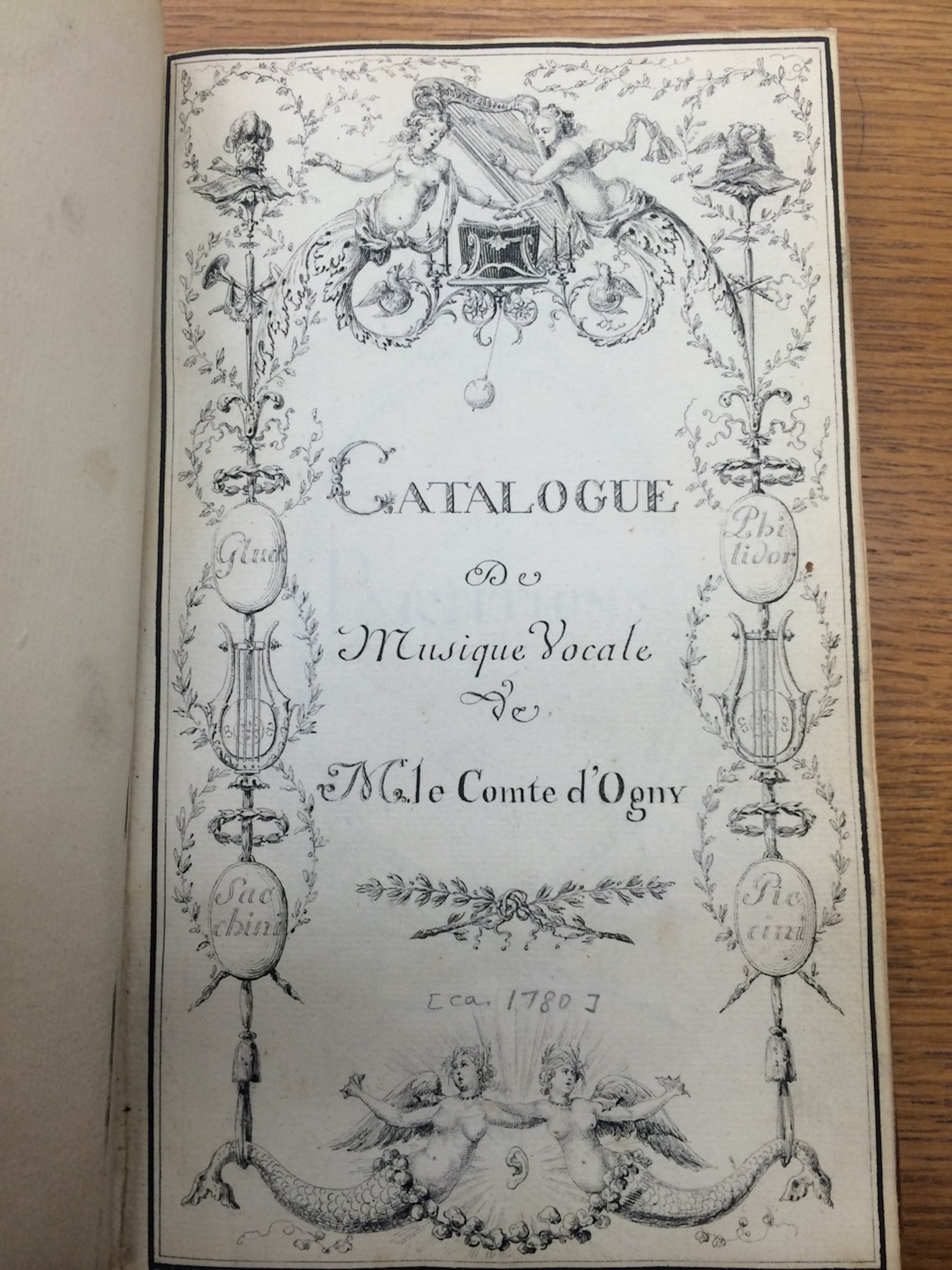
Title page of the Catalogue de la Musique vocale de M. le comte d'Ogny (Library of Congress)

With his friend Étienne-Marie de La Haye, survivor of his father, the ferme générale Marin de La Haye des Fosses, he founded the Olympic Lodge in 1782, the main object of which was the organization of concerts intended to replace the Concert des Amateurs dissolved in 1781 following the bankruptcy of one of its supporters, the tax ferme générale Pierre Haudry de Soucy. The concert des Amateurs used to take place in the salons of the Hôtel de Soubise and was founded by their respective fathers, the Baron d'Ogny and Marin de La Haye des Fosses in 1769. The concerts of the Olympic Lodge were managed by the Olympic Society, the commercial entity of the Lodge, which installed a club for its subscribers in 1785 at the Palais Royal, known as the Sallon Olympique. On the first floor were the rooms of the lodge itself. The Olympic Society inherited the considerable musical background of the Concert des Amateurs which it continued to enrich thanks to the numerous and high contributions of its members. The most famous acquisition was that of the six Paris symphonies (82 to 87) and symphonies 90-92 commissioned to Joseph Haydn through Comte d'Ogny and the Chevalier de Saint-Georges.

The concerts took place in the Social Contract Room (attached to the Saint John of Scotland Lodge and the Social Contract), in the Hôtel de Bullion, rue Coq-Héron, until 1786. Then they took their seats in the Hall of the Hundred Swiss of the Tuileries Palace, liberated by the Concert Spirituel which had emigrated to the Salle des Machines in 1784, itself abandoned by the French Comedians who settled in 1782 in the Théâtre Français (which became in 1797 the Théâtre de l'Odéon). After 5 and 6 October 1789, when the Court was installed at the Tuileries Palace, the "Salle des Cents-Suisses" returned to its original destination as "Salle des Gardes" and the Olympic Society ended its concerts. It was probably at this period, that the Comte d'Ogny donated his musical background to the Olympic Society. This considerable library represented the last twenty years of the musical life of the Ancien regime when it was most innovative. The works were premiered at the Concert des Amateurs, followed by those of the Olympic Society, when they followed, before being included among others by the Concert Spirituel.

On the death of the Comte d'Ogny, the collection was subject of a public sale which lasted at least four days, from 7 to 10 February 1791. One can only identify as coming from this remarkable collection that of the nine autograph partitions of the "Symphonies Of the Olympic Lodge" by Haydn, kept at the Bibliothèque Nationale for n° 82(1786), 83(1785), 86(1786), 87(1785) and 92(1789) and the Morgan Library for the 91(1788). The autograph manuscript of the Hob I 90 symphony is preserved in the Library of Congress of the United States. There are also two partial manuscript inventories, begun at the request of the Comte d'Ogny, presumably by his assistant the violinist Stanislas-Laurent Bréval, one entitled Catalogue de la Musique de Monsieur le comte d’Ogny, British Library, Hirsch IV.1085, 52p;, Supplément [66], 67 p. the other Catalogue de la Musique vocale de Monsieur le comte d’Ogny, Library of Congress, 220 p. (ML31. H43q no. 12. CASE).

The Comte d'Ogny was a third-chair cellist in the orchestra of the Société Olympique. The Musée de la Musique in Paris retains a chamber organ of the Parisian factor Jean-Baptiste-Jérémie Schweickart that belonged to him.

== Death ==
Gabriel-François de Brueys d'Aigalliers in a letter to Isabelle de Charrière dated 13 October 1790 from Paris wrote:

"This young man, one of the most obliging and amiable I knew, died almost suddenly a few days ago, carrying away the regrets of all that knew him"

== Works ==
- Réponse au Mémoire présenté à l'Assemblée Nationale par les ex-Postillons, signed: le comte d'Ogny, [Paris], [1790], in 4°, (p. 116).
- Réglemens de la Loge et Société Olympique, [Paris], [1787]. in 12, (p. 59).

== Sources ==
- Nicolas Viton de Saint-Allais, Nobiliaire universel de France ou recueil général des généalogies historiques des maisons nobles de ce royaume, Paris, Au bureau du nobiliaire universel de France, 1818, (p. 362).
- Société académique de l'Aube, Mémoires de la Société d'agriculture, sciences et arts du département de l'Aube, tome 93, 1930, (p. 114).
