= Concert des Amateurs =

French music concert company

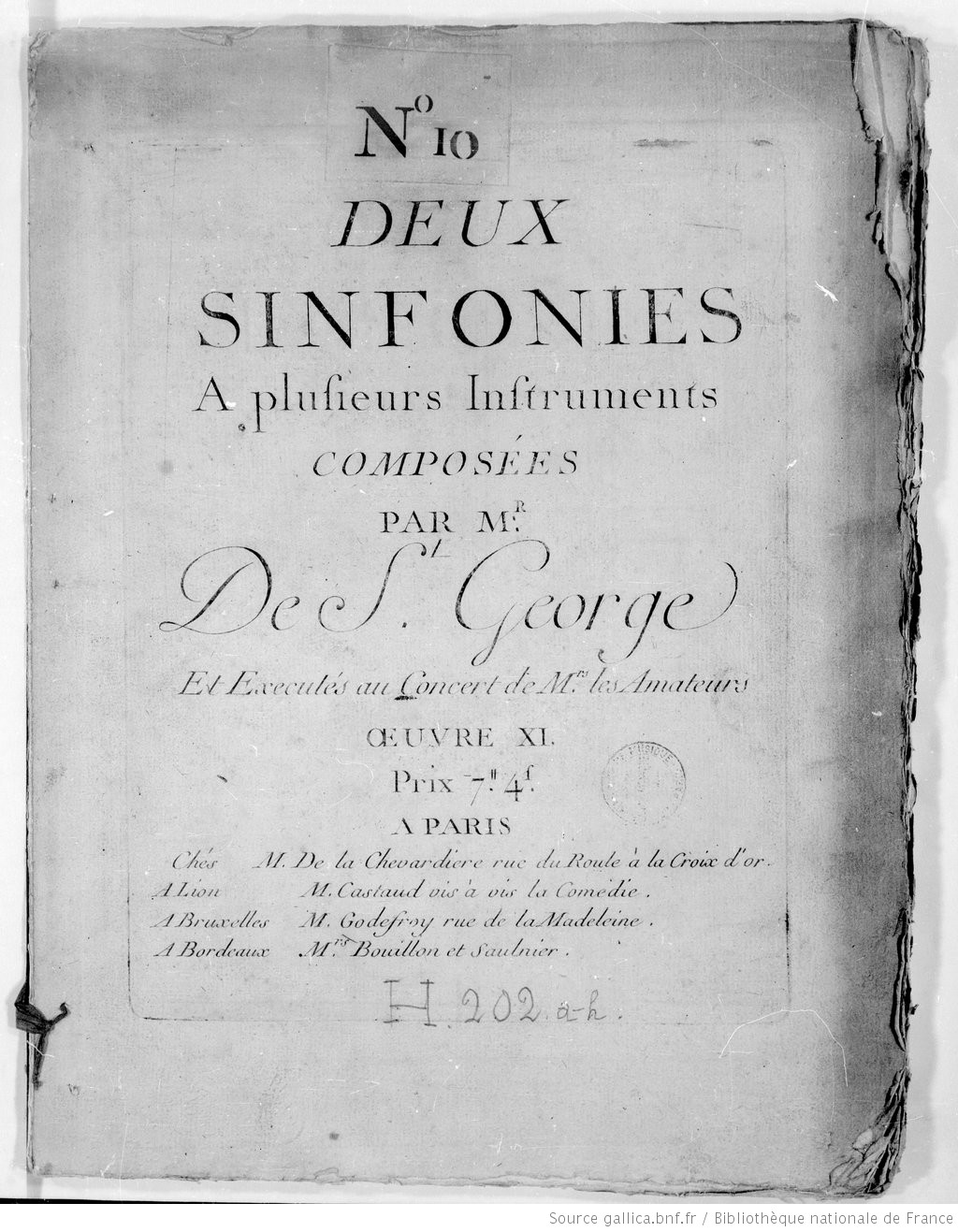
Deux Sinfonies de Saint-George (1779)

The Concert des Amateurs was a company which organized musical concerts in France. Established in 1769 it was dissolved in 1781.

== History ==
The Concert des Amateurs was created in 1769 and housed at the Hôtel de Soubise in Paris. It was financed only by private funds. (Note: Included in private funds were donations and annual subscriptions.) Unlike all other societies of the time, it competed with the Concert Spirituel, inaugurated in 1725. From 1769 to 1773, the Concert des Amateurs was directed by the founder of the society François-Joseph Gossec; Joseph Bologne de Saint-George replaced him.

Every week, from December to March, the Concert des Amateurs performed contemporary and/or unpublished works, sometimes in premiere.

In the absence of financial means, the Concert des Amateurs disappeared in 1781.

== Bibliography ==
- Tissot, Robert Henri; Bellissant, Camille (2004). Le Concert des Amateurs à l'Hôtel de Soubise (1769-1781); Une institution musicale parisienne en marge de la Cour. Grenoble: MSH Alpes. ISBN 2-914242-15-8.
