= Concert de la Loge Olympique =

Orchestral ensemble and concert series in Paris

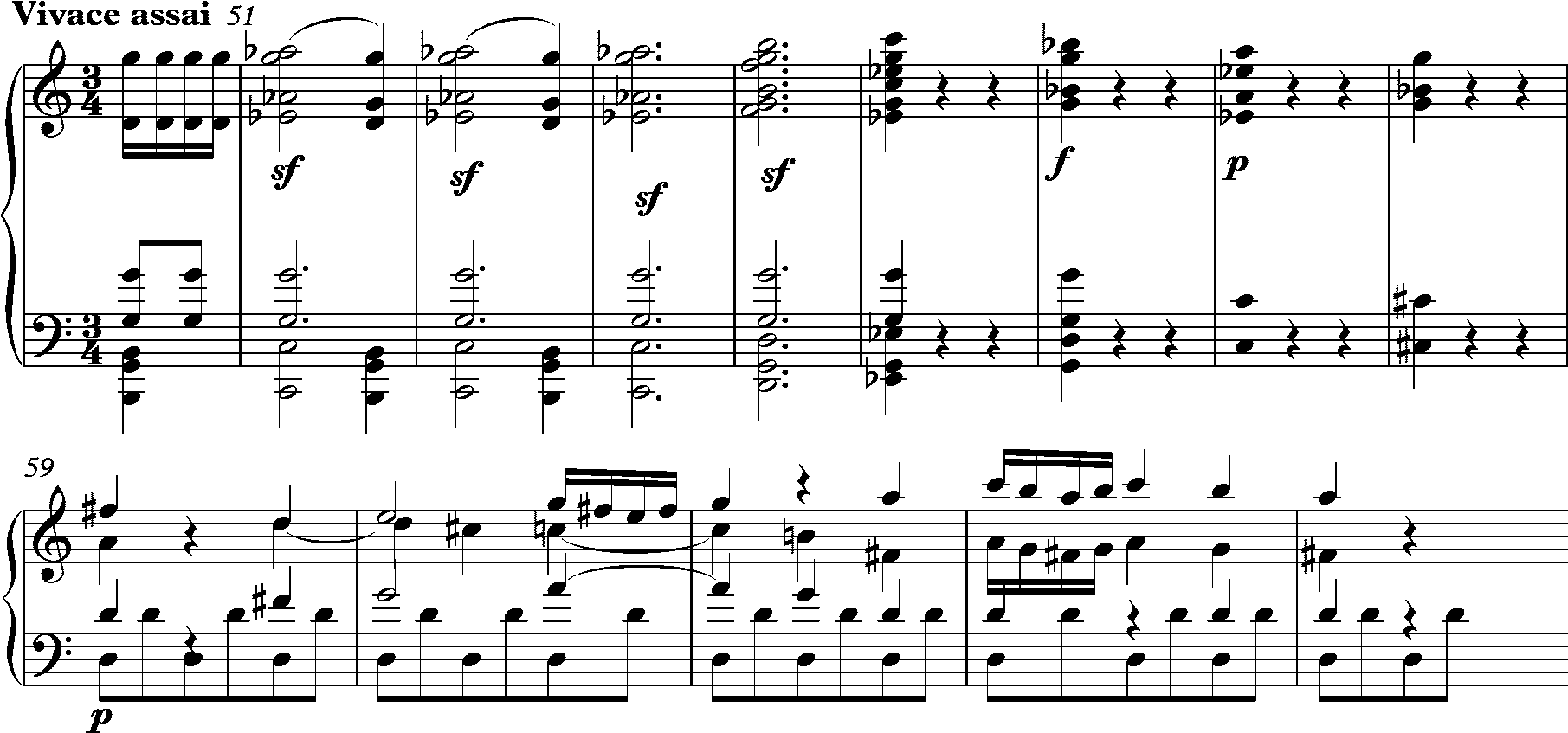
Haydn: the first of the Paris symphonies.

The Concert de la Loge Olympique was a concert company founded in the 1780s by the fermier général Charles Marin de La Haye des Fosses and Count Claude-François-Marie Rigoley. The main conductor was Joseph Bologne de Saint-George.

The orchestra was considered one of the best in Europe and in particular commissioned Joseph Haydn with the so-called "Paris symphonies" (82 to 87). The company ceased all activity in 1789.

== Recreation in January 2015, change of name in 2016 ==
Recreated in 2015 at the initiative of the violinist and musical director Julien Chauvin, this formation is intended not only as the heir of the name, but also of the artistic approach of that of the 18th century. The favorite repertoire is the music of the late 18th century, one of its characteristics being the use of period instruments.

But the new musical ensemble was opposed by the French National Olympic and Sports Committee, which objected to the use of the term "Olympic". Threatened with legal proceedings if it did not change his name by 11 February 2016, the Concert withdrew its name from the National Institute of Industrial Property by the end of January, and its website is now the hallmark of the Concert de la Loge. A support committee was created, and the orchestra called for public support.

== Sources ==
- Jean-Luc Quoy-Bodin, "L'orchestre de la Société Olympique en 1786", Revue de Musicologie, vol. 70, No 1 (1984), (pp.|95–107).
