= 1786 in music =

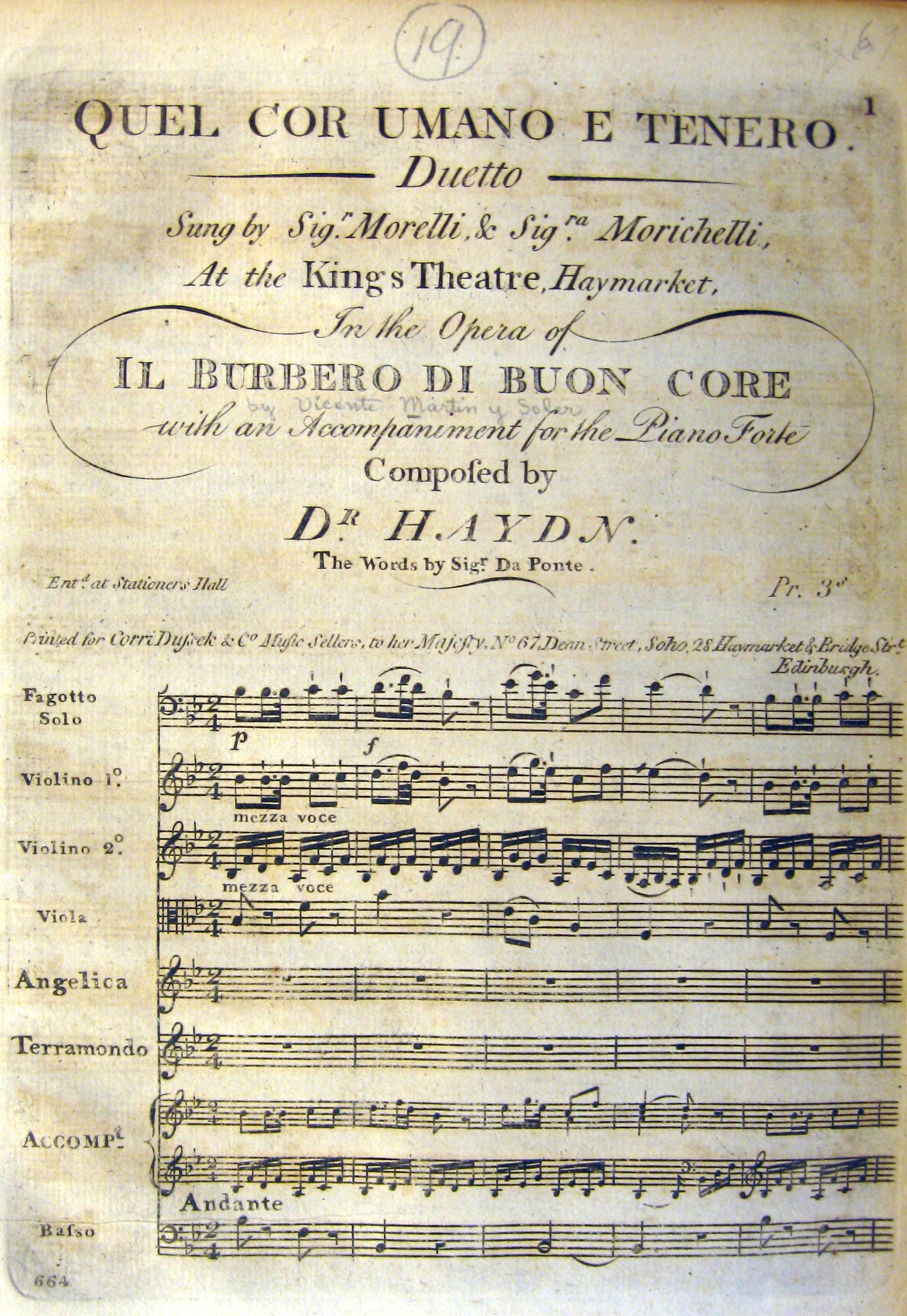
Manuscript of Joseph Haydn’s “Quel cor umano e tenero,” first performed in 1786

== Events ==
- January 21 – Luigi Boccherini becomes an official composer to Prince Frederick William of Prussia.
- February 7 – Joseph II, Holy Roman Emperor, presents a festival at Schönbrunn Palace, at which new compositions by both Wolfgang Amadeus Mozart and Antonio Salieri are performed.
- April 28 – Leopold Mozart writes to his daughter, Maria Anna Mozart, predicting failure for his son's latest opera, The Marriage of Figaro. In fact its premiere on May 1 under the composer's baton at the Burgtheater in Vienna is a success with encores demanded. The libretto is by Lorenzo da Ponte.
- October 18 – Leopold Mozart is given a blood test on the same day that his daughter-in-law Constanze Mozart gives birth to her third child, Johann Thomas Leopold; the baby dies a month later, Leopold the following year.
- November 7 – America's oldest singing society is founded as the Stoughton Musical Society.
- November 24 – Carl Ditters von Dittersdorf unsuccessfully seeks employment with the newly enthroned King Frederick William II of Prussia.
- In Britain, William Parsons succeeds John Stanley as Master of the King's Musick.
- In Benares, Jiwan Shah and Francis Fowke conduct an experiment comparing the pitch of the harpsichord with that of a traditional Indian instrument.
- Georg Joseph Vogler is appointed Kapellmeister to King Gustav III of Sweden.

== Publications ==
- Johann Wilhelm Hässler – 6 Leichte Sonaten, Theil 1
- Leopold Kozeluch – Three Piano Sonatas, Op. 20
- Maria Theresia von Paradis – Zwölf Lieder auf ihrer Reise in Musik gesetzt, composed on tour over the previous two years
- Christian Friedrich Daniel Schubart – Musicalische Rhapsodien

== Classical music ==
- Carl Philipp Emanuel Bach – Funeral music for A. Schulte
- Johann Christoph Friedrich Bach – Ino, BR G 48
- Cecilia Maria Barthélemon
  - Op. 1: Three Sonatas for the Piano-Forte, or Harpsichord, the Second with an Accompaniment for the Violin
  - 6 English and Italian Songs, Op.2
- Luigi Boccherini – Symphony in C major, G.515
- Carl Ditters von Dittersdorf
  - Der Apotheker und der Doktor (singspiel)
  - Giobbe (oratorio)
- Xaver Hammer – Gamba Sonata No.1 in D major
- Joseph Haydn
  - Symphony No. 82 in C ("Bear")
  - Symphony No. 84 in Eb
  - Symphony No. 86 in D
  - Concerto for 2 "Lyra organizzata" Hob.VIIh:3
  - Cavatina: "Sono Alcina e sono ancora" Hob.XXIVb:9
  - Recit: "Ah, tu non senti, amico" and Aria: "Qual destra omicida" Hob.XXIVb:10
- Wolfgang Amadeus Mozart
  - Rondo in D for Keyboard, K. 485
  - Piano Concerto No. 23 in A, K. 488
  - Duet for Soprano and Tenor, “Spiegarti no poss'io”, K. 489
  - Scena and Rondo for Soprano, “Non più, tutti ascoltai”, K. 490
  - Piano Concerto No. 24 in C minor, K. 491
  - Quartet in E♭ for Piano and Strings, K. 493
  - Concerto No. 4 in E♭ for Horn and Orchestra, K. 495
  - Trio No. 2 in G for Piano, Violin and Violoncello, K. 496
  - Concerto No. 25 in C for Piano and Orchestra, K. 503
  - Symphony No. 38 in D "Prague", K. 504
  - Canon for 3 Voices in F major, K.507
- Giovanni Paisiello – Amor vendicato, R.2.7
- Ignaz Pleyel – Symphony in C major, B.128
- Corona Schröter – 25 Lieder
- Michel Yost – Clarinet Concerto No.14

== Opera ==
- Gioacchino Albertini – Virginia
- Bonifazio Asioli – Le nozze in villa
- Dmitri Stepanovich Bortniansky – Le Faucon
- Nicolas Dalayrac – Nina, premiered May 15 in Paris
- François-Joseph Gossec – Rosine, ou L’épouse abandonnée
- André Grétry – Amphitryon
- Lucille Grétry – Le mariage d’Antonio
- Wolfgang Amadeus Mozart
  - Der Schauspieldirektor (The Impresario)
  - Le nozze di Figaro (The Marriage of Figaro)
- Antonio Salieri
  - Les Horaces
  - Prima la musica e poi le parole
- Giuseppe Sarti – Armida e Rinaldo
- Johann Christoph Vogel – La Toison d'or, premiered Sept. 5 in Paris

== Published popular music ==
- First edition of Elias Mann's Worcester Collection

== Methods and theory writings ==
- Francesco Azopardi – Il musico prattico
- Henry Beck – Flute Book
- Antonio D. R. Borghese – L’art musical ramené à ses vrais principes
- João Ribeiro de Almeida Campos – Elementos de Musica
- Johann Adam Hiller – Nachricht von der Aufführung des Händelschen Messias
- Friedrich Wilhelm Marpurg – Legende einiger Musikheiligen
- James Nares – A Concise and Easy Treatise on Singing, with a Set of English Duets for Beginners
- Joseph Riepel – Baßschlüssel
- Ignaz Schweigl – Grundlehre der Violin

== Births ==
- January 3 – Johann Christian Friedrich Schneider, composer
- February 16 – Grand Duchess Maria Pavlovna of Russia, amateur composer and patron (died 1859)
- April 11 – Johann Friedrich Kelz, composer (died 1862)
- April 18 – Franz Xaver Schnyder von Wartensee, composer (died 1868)
- June 20 – Marceline Desbordes-Valmore, lyricist (died 1859)
- June 21 – Charles Edward Horn, singer and composer (died 1849)
- July 25 – Giacomo Cordella, composer (died 1847)
- September 11 – Friedrich Kuhlau, composer (died 1832)
- September 12 – Jean-Louis Tulou, composer (died 1865)
- September 26 – August Mühling, German composer (died 1847)
- September 27 – José Mariano Elízaga, composer (died 1842)
- October 3 – Carl Almenräder, bassoonist (died 1846)
- October 21 – Henry Lemoine, composer (died 1854)
- November 10 – Carl Eberwein, violinist and composer (died 1868)
- November 18
  - Carl Maria von Weber, composer (or December 18)
  - Sir Henry Bishop, Professor of Music at Oxford
- December 20 – Pietro Raimondi, composer
- date unknown
  - Konstantinos Nikolopoulos, composer (died 1841)
  - Elena Pucić-Sorkočević, composer (died 1865)

== Deaths ==
- January 4 – Moses Mendelssohn, philosopher and grandfather of composers Felix Mendelssohn and Fanny Mendelssohn (born 1729)
- January 14 – Michael Arne, composer (born c.1740)
- February 16 – Johann Georg Schürer, composer (born 1720)
- March 7 – Frantisek Benda, composer (born 1709)
- March 21 – Johann Gottlieb Preller, cantor and composer (born 1727)
- April 13 – Jan Tomáš Kuzník, composer and music teacher (born 1716)
- May 19 – John Stanley, composer (born 1712)
- June 2 – Giovanni Battista Lampugnani, composer (born 1706)
- July – Sophia Baddeley, actress and singer (born 1745)
- July 5 – Michel Yost, composer (born 1754)
- July 29 – Franz Asplmayr, composer (born 1728)
- August 2 – François-Louis Gand Le Bland Du Roullet, librettist (born 1716)
- August 17 – King Frederick II of Prussia, amateur composer (born 1712)
- August 26 – Christoph Christian Sturm, lyricist (born 1786)
- September 6 – Karl von Ordóñez, composer (born 1734)
- September 18 – Giovanni Battista Guadagnini, musical instrument maker (born 1711)
- September 29 – Dietrich Ewald von Grotthuss pianist and composer (born 1751)
- October 6 – Antonio Sacchini, composer (born 1730)
- December 25 – Christoph Sonnleithner, composer (born 1734)
