= Demophon =

Demophon or Demophoon may refer to:

== Mythology ==
- Demophon of Athens, son of Theseus and Phaedra
- Demophon of Eleusis, or Demophoon, son of King Celeus and Queen Metanira
- Demophon of Elaeus, Greek Thracian king

== Music ==
- Demofonte or Demofoonte, 1731 Italian-language libretto by Metastasio
- Demofoonte (Gluck), 1743 Italian-language opera by Christoph Willibald Gluck
- Demofoonte (Mysliveček, 1775), Italian-language opera by Josef Mysliveček
- Demofoonte (Mysliveček, 1769), Italian-language opera by Josef Mysliveček
- Demofonte (Berezovsky), 1773 Italian-language opera by Maksym Berezovsky
- Démophon, 1789 French-language opera by Johann Christoph Vogel
- Démophoon, 1788 French-language opera by Luigi Cherubini

== Other ==
- Demophon (seer), a seer in Alexander's entourage

== See also ==
- 4057 Demophon, asteroid named after Demophon of Athens
