= Démophoon =

Opera composed by Luigi Cherubini

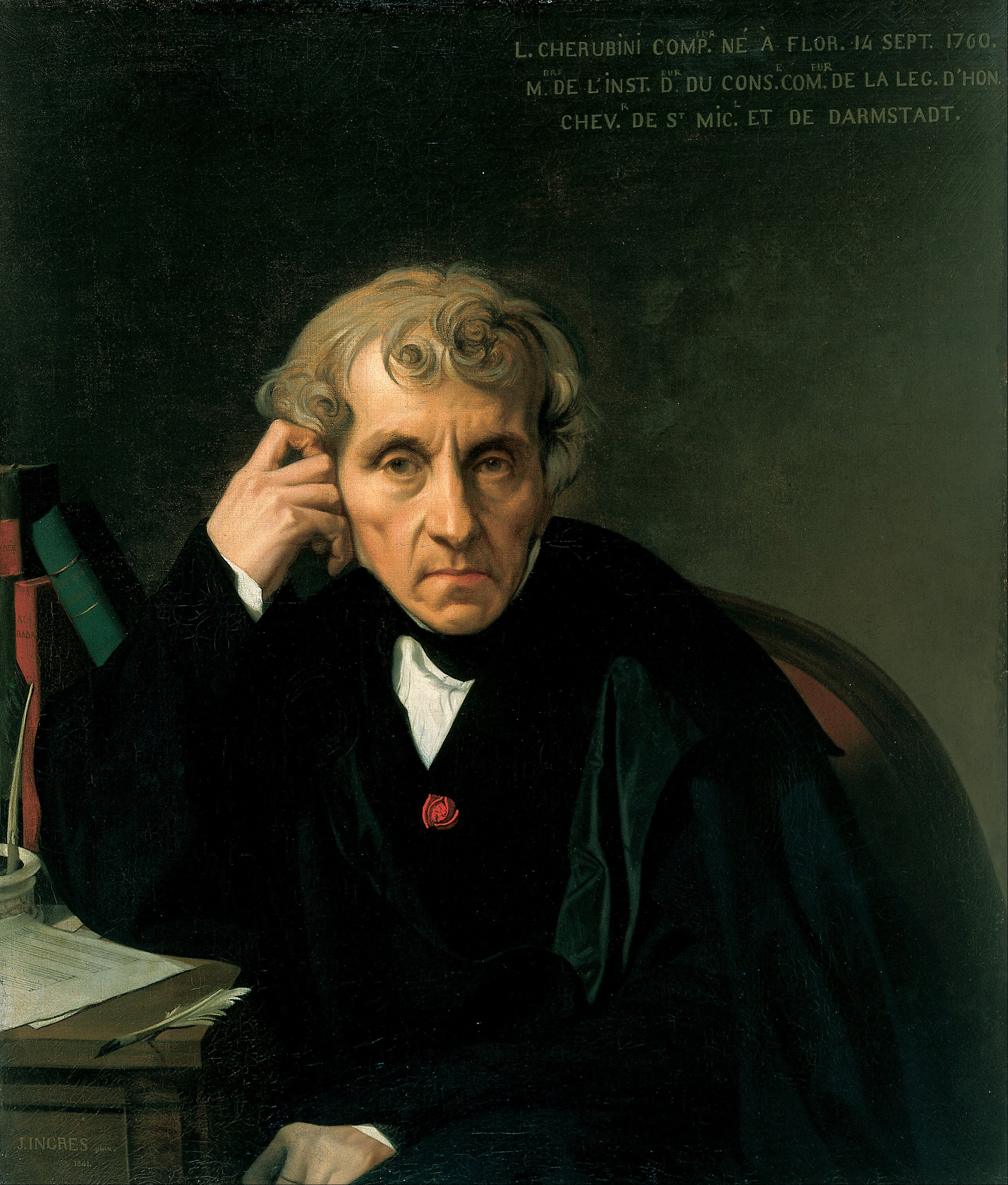
Luigi Cherubini

Démophoon (sometimes spelt Démophon) is an opera by the composer Luigi Cherubini, first performed at the Académie Royale de Musique (the Paris Opera) on 2 December 1788. It takes the form of a tragédie lyrique in three acts. The libretto, by Jean-François Marmontel, is based on Demofoonte by Metastasio.

== Performance history and reception ==
Démophoon was Cherubini's first French opera after his move from London to Paris. It was not a success and was soon eclipsed by Johann Christoph Vogel's opera on the same subject, which premiered the following year. The musicologist Basil Deane writes: "In retrospect it is easy to see that failure was inevitable. Marmontel based his French libretto on Metastasio, but sacrificed his predecessor's directness by introducing a superfluous sub-plot. Diffuse in structure, his text is pompously banal in language." The Italian Cherubini also had difficulty setting French and there are numerous examples of false accentuation. He was also only partially successful at changing his musical style from that of opera seria to one influenced by Christoph Willibald Gluck, who was then fashionable in France.

Some later critics have been much more enthusiastic about the score. E. J. Dent wrote, "Cherubini produced a French opera, Démophoon, which in its technical accomplishment is as masterly as anything of Mozart's. If any work ever deserved the epithet 'classical', it is Démophoon."

== Roles ==
Cast	Voice type	Premiere
Démophoon, King of Thrace	basse-taille (bass-baritone)	Auguste-Athanase (Augustin) Chéron
Osmide, son of Démophoon	tenor	Étienne Lainez
Néade, Démophoon's second son	tenor	Jean-Joseph Rousseau
Ircile, princess of Phrygia	soprano	Anne Chéron (née Cameroy, called "Mlle Dozon")
Astor, warrior of the army and the court of Démophoon	baritone	François Lays
Dircé, daughter of Astor, wife of Osmide	soprano	Antoinette Saint-Huberty
Adraste, captain of Démophoon's guards	tenor	Martin
Lygdame, high priest of Apollo	basse-taille (bass-baritone)	Moreau
An officer of the palace	basse-taille (bass-baritone)	Châteaufort
The oracle	basse-taille (bass-baritone)	Châteaufort
A priestess	soprano	Anne-Marie-Jeanne Gavaudan (the elder)
A child	mute	Mlle Desforges
Chorus: Priests, priestesses, young girls, people of Thrace, warriors

== Sources ==
- Original libretto on Google Books
- Basil Deane, Cherubini, Oxford University Press, 1965
- Edward Joseph Dent The Rise of Romantic Opera (Cambridge University Press, 1979 edition)
- Raffaele Mellace (2007). "Démophoon". In Piero Gelli (ed.). Dizionario dell'opera 2008 (in Italian). Milan: Baldini Castoldi Dalai. p. 302. ISBN 978-88-6073-184-5.
