= Love & Friendship (soundtrack) =

Love & Friendship (Original Motion Picture Soundtrack)

Soundtrack album by Mark Suozzo and the Irish Film Orchestra
- Released: 6 May 2016
- Recorded: August 27–28, 2015
- Studios: Ted Spencer Recording, New York City; Windmill Lane Studios, Dublin
- Genres: Film score; classical; baroque
- Length: 32:19
- Label: Sony Classical
- Producers: Mark Suozzo; Benjamin Esdraffo

Mark Suozzo chronology
| Unorthodox (2013) | Love & Friendship (2016) | Swim Team (2016) |

Love & Friendship (Original Motion Picture Soundtrack) is the soundtrack accompanying the 2016 period film Love & Friendship directed by Whit Stillman. The album consisted of the musical score composed by Mark Suozzo and opening theme composed by Benjamin Esdraffo, along with reworkings of several classical pieces from the late 18th century conducted by Suozzo and performed by the Irish Film Orchestra. The album was released through Sony Classical Records on 6 May 2016.

== Background ==
Mark Suozzo composed the score for Love & Friendship after doing so for all of Stillman's previous films. He recorded the film's score at the Windmill Lane Studios in Dublin during August 27–28, 2015 where he would also conduct the orchestral sessions performed by the Irish Film Orchestra. French composer Benjamin Esdraffo wrote two themes for the film—which includes the opening harp theme—and additional pieces contributing the film score. Suozzo wrote fewer musical cues.

The film accompanied instrumental renditions of works from classical composers such as William Boyce, George Frideric Handel, Henry Purcell, Wolfgang Amadeus Mozart, Antonio Vivaldi and Ludwig van Beethoven. According to Stillman, while Austen's novel was set during the 1790s, he felt that he used works earlier so that it could "reflect the spirit of the piece" better. Stillman's likeness for baroque music was also instrumental in his musical selections. Film editor Sophie Curra helped on selecting specific music from the time period. while Etienne Jardin, an expert on period music, helped Stillman with the musical research on works from French composers. Most of the musical pieces from Suozzo's score were included in the editing process with the beginning of the credits, as according to Stillman, "every line is coordinated with the music, with the graphics as they appear" which he considered important while editing the film in synchronous to the music.

== Reception ==
Justin Chang of Variety wrote "the tuneful accompaniment of Benjamin Esdraffo and Mark Suozzo’s piano-and-strings score [...] hums along so mellifluously that you could easily enjoy it with your eyes closed". James Manheim of AllMusic wrote "The soundtrack, in short cuts, effectively captures the quick rhythms of Stillman's film and for that reason will likely satisfy fans of the film."

== Track listing ==
| No. | Title | Writer(s) | Artist(s) | Length |
|---|---|---|---|---|
| 1. | "Love & Friendship Harp Theme" | Benjamin Esdraffo | Dianne Marshall | 0:57 |
| 2. | "Music for the Funeral of Queen Mary" | Henry Purcell | Mark Suozzo; Irish Film Orchestra | 1:32 |
| 3. | "Symphony No. 6 In F Major: Largo" | William Boyce | Mark Suozzo; Irish Film Orchestra | 1:04 |
| 4. | "Arietta" | Mark Suozzo | Mark Suozzo; Irish Film Orchestra; Archie Chen; Dianne Marshall; Paul Woodiel; William Butt | 2:09 |
| 5. | "The Mass for Mr. Mauroy: Agnus Dei" | Marc-Antoine Charpentier | Mark Suozzo; Irish Film Orchestra | 0:50 |
| 6. | "Cessate, omai Cassai: Ah Ch'infelice Semprei" | Antonio Vivaldi | Mark Suozzo; Irish Film Orchestra; Chloe Morgan | 1:16 |
| 7. | "A Medley of Marches" | André-Ernest-Modeste Grétry; Antonio Sacchini; François-Joseph Gossec | Mark Suozzo; Irish Film Orchestra | 1:29 |
| 8. | "String Quartet" | Hyacinthe Jadin | Mark Suozzo; Irish Film Orchestra | 0:53 |
| 9. | "From Giulio Cesare in Egitto" | George Frideric Handel | Mark Suozzo; Irish Film Orchestra | 0:53 |
| 10. | "Cello Sonata No.3 in A Major: Adagio" | Ludwig van Beethoven | William Butt; Archie Chen | 0:42 |
| 11. | "Rodelinda: Ombre piante, urne funestre" | George Frideric Handel; Nicola Francesco Haym | Mark Suozzo; Irish Film Orchestra; Chloe Morgan | 0:56 |
| 12. | "Symphony in C Major for Wind Orchestra" | François-Joseph Gossec | Mark Suozzo; Irish Film Orchestra | 0:44 |
| 13. | "Allegro for Strings and Piano" | Mark Suozzo | Mark Suozzo; Irish Film Orchestra; Archie Chen; Dianne Marshall; Paul Woodiel; William Butt | 0:34 |
| 14. | "Tamerlano: Cor di Padre" | George Frideric Handel; Nicola Francesco Haym | Mark Suozzo; Irish Film Orchestra; Chloe Morgan | 0:59 |
| 15. | "La Toison d'Orf" | Johann Christoph Vogel | Mark Suozzo; Irish Film Orchestra | 0:36 |
| 16. | "Sir Roger de Coverley" | Traditional | Mark Suozzo; Irish Film Orchestra | 1:15 |
| 17. | "Scipione: March" | George Frideric Handel | Mark Suozzo; Irish Film Orchestra | 1:27 |
| 18. | "Amadis de Gaule: Ballet-March" | Johann Sebastian Bach | Mark Suozzo; Irish Film Orchestra | 0:43 |
| 19. | "Prélude" | Henri Fremart | Mark Suozzo; Irish Film Orchestra | 2:32 |
| 20. | "Stabat Mater, RV621: Eja mater, fons amoris" | Antonio Vivaldi | Mark Suozzo; Irish Film Orchestra | 0:43 |
| 21. | "Cello Concerto in C Major, RV402 Allegro" | Antonio Vivaldi | Mark Suozzo; Irish Film Orchestra | 1:23 |
| 22. | "Idomeneo: March" | Wolfgang Amadeus Mozart | Mark Suozzo; Irish Film Orchestra | 1:03 |
| 23. | "Cosî fan Tutte: Soave com il vento" | Lorenzo Da Ponte; Wolfgang Amadeus Mozart | Mark Suozzo; Irish Film Orchestra; Paul McCough; Chloe Morgan; Sarah Brady | 3:17 |
| 24. | "Wedding March" | Benjamin Esdraffo | Mark Suozzo; Irish Film Orchestra | 1:00 |
| 25. | "Love Will Find Out the Way" | Traditional | Mark Suozzo; Irish Film Orchestra | 1:09 |
| 26. | "Chaconne La Sonning" | François d'Agincourt | David Adams | 1:01 |
| 27. | "Prélude" | Henri Fremart | Mark Suozzo; Irish Film Orchestra | 1:12 |
| Total length: | | | | 32:19 |

== Personnel ==
Credits adapted from liner notes:

- Mark Suozzo – composer, conductor, orchestrator, arranger, producer
- Benjamin Esdraffo – composer (tracks: 1, 24), additional music, arranger, producer
- Tomas Peire Serrate – orchestrator, arranger, programmer, additional music
- Stephen McLaughlin – music recording engineer, music scoring mixer
- The Irish Film Orchestra – performer
- Crux Vocal Ensemble – performer
- Paul McGough – choral contractor, vocalist
- William Butt – cello
- David Adams – continuo
- Dianne Marshall – harp
- David Weiss – woodwinds
- Archie Chen – piano
- Chloë Martin – vocals
- Sarah Brady – vocals
- Etienne Jardin – music advisor
- Poppy Kavanagh – music production assistant
