= Robert W. Cole =

American conductor (1931–2026)

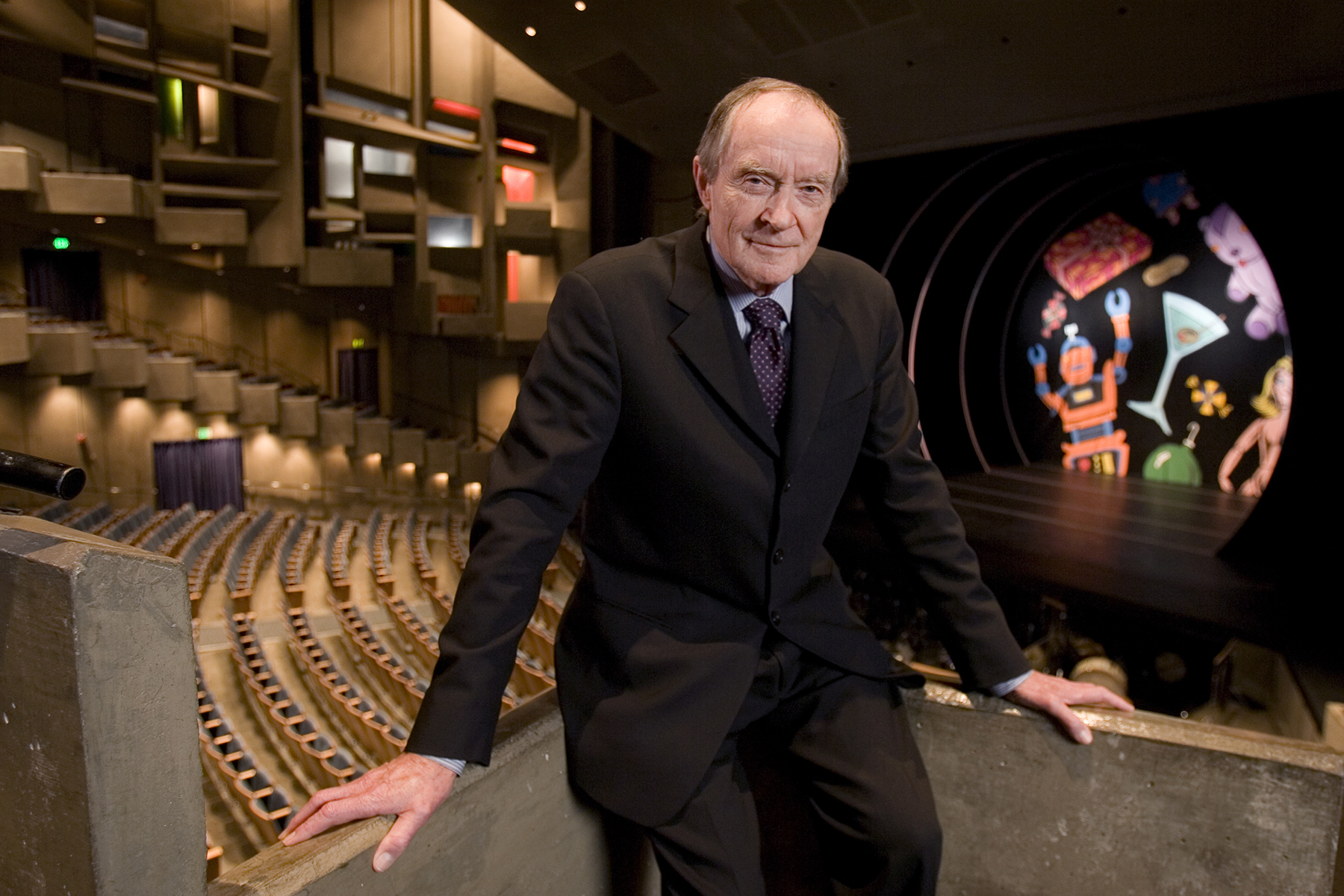
- Born: March 31, 1931 (age 95); San Jose, California
- Died: July 11, 2026 (aged 95)
- Education: San Jose State University; University of Southern California
- Occupation: Arts Administrator
- Organization: Cal Performances

Robert Walton Cole (March 15, 1931 – July 11, 2026) was an American conductor, impresario and arts administrator. He was the Director of Cal Performances at the University of California, Berkeley from 1986 until his retirement in 2009. During his tenure, he elevated Cal Performances from a regional presenting arts program into a premier presenting, producing, and commissioning organization.

== Early life ==
Robert Cole was born in San Jose, California, on March 15, 1931. His father died when he was 22 in an automobile accident, six months before Cole was born. He was raised by his mother and maternal grandparents; his grandfather was a minister in the Church of the Nazarene in San Jose. His father had left him a 1/4 size violin, and he started taking lessons when he was six years old; his passion for music continued throughout his upbringing and eventually became a central part of his life.

== Education and military service ==
Cole began his college education at San Jose State University, and spending at least a semester at the University of Texas at El Paso where his grandmother lived. After earning his bachelors from San Jose State, he enlisted in the U.S. Air Force during the Korean War and was sent to Parks Air Force Base in Dublin, California, where musicians with talent could be trained to play in the Air Force Band. Subsequently he was stationed at St. John's, Newfoundland as a sergeant in the Air Force Band. Later he returned to California, earning a masters degree from the University of Southern California School of Music, where he trained as a conductor under Ingolf Dahl.

== Early career ==
Cole began his professional career as a high school band director in Tulare, California. In 1960, he started the Tulare County Symphony, and was the director of the symphony until 1973. During this time he also pursued a career as a conductor, moving to Los Angeles and taking up the baton as guest conductor for the Pasadena Symphony, West End Symphony Orchestra, and Riverside Opera Association. While in Los Angeles he was an adjunct faculty member at Immaculate Heart College, and at the same time was an instructor at North Hollywood High School, where he met Michael Tilson Thomas, who was a senior at the time.

In 1969, Cole branched out into ballet, becoming conductor and director of the Ballet Society of Los Angeles, which performed at Wilshire Ebell Theater and other locations around Los Angeles. As director of the Ballet Society, he collaborated with choreographer David Lichine, and the star of the Ballet Russes Tania Riabouchinska. He was also introduced to board member Joanne Woodward.

During that time, Cole was spending his summers at the Tanglewood Music Center under a conducting fellowship. Tilson Thomas was assistant conductor at the Boston Symphony, and invited Cole to the Tanglewood Institute to study conducting under Leonard Bernstein and Léon Barzin. In 1973, Tilson Thomas, now music director at the Buffalo Philharmonic Orchestra, invited Cole to audition for the orchestra as associate conductor; Cole accepted the position and moved to Buffalo, NY.

== Career ==
Cole was associate conductor of the Buffalo Philharmonic from 1973 to 1977. He experimented with a variety of programming ideas for a concert series. He invited the Dance Theatre of Harlem to perform with the Philharmonic at Kleinhans Music Hall. The concert was a success, but the shortcomings of a dance company performing in a concert hall were evident. Cole invited the company to return, and in approached the community leaders of Buffalo to restore the historic Shea's Buffalo Theatre. The community responded, and Dance Theatre of Harlem returned. In subsequent years the New York City Ballet and Merce Cunningham also performed at Shea's. By then Cole had assumed the role of Executive Director, and made the pivot from conductor to arts presenter.

He left Shea's Buffalo in 1979, arriving in Poughkeepsie to restore another historic theater, the Bardavon Opera House. He was Executive Director until 1983. During his tenure, the venue was home to the Hudson Valley Philharmonic. Cole co-presented opera with the Syracuse Opera Theater, and brought dance company Joffrey II to the venue.

Cole accepted a position as Executive Director for the Brooklyn Center for the Performing Arts at Brooklyn College. He was there for three years, from 1983 to 1986. But he clashed with the administration, and although he was in New York, where he wanted to be, he was unhappy.

=== Cal Performances ===
In 1986, Cole came upon an advertisement in the New York Times for a director of Cal Performances at the University of California, Berkeley. He applied, interviewed, and accepted the position. By his own account the first few years were rocky; the relationship between Cal Performances and the faculty at the university was dismal. The staff didn't initially support what he was trying to do.

By 1995, he declared to the San Francisco Chronicle: "We are not out to be the best in the Bay Area. We have no interest in competing with San Francisco or San Jose. We are competing with New York, London, and Paris." He created a diverse presenting program that featured regular appearances by the Alvin Ailey American Dance Theater, Mark Morris Dance Group, Yo-Yo Ma and Cecilia Bartoli. He fostered direct relationships with these artists, which gave him the opportunity to collaborate on productions including the American premiere of Jean-Phillip Rameau's Platée in 1998.

Cal Performances presented Morris' Platée as part of the fifth season of the Berkeley Festival & Exhibition, which Cole had created in 1990. Cole had knowledge of many aspects of music, including classical, jazz, contemporary and early music. There was already a community of early music aficionados and artists as well as academic experts in the Music Department. He saw this as an opportunity to build bridges with the department, and to demonstrate his bona fides when it came to his knowledge of music. Cole's idea was to collaborate with the Music Department to present a full summer program of early music that would compliment the Boston Early Music Festival, which was held every other year. The inaugural festival was a weeklong event in June that included concerts, symposia and master classes, and featured an exhibit hall in the Pauley Ballroom of the student union. Over time and faced with financial pressures, Cal Performances withdrew as primary sponsor, shifting the program to the San Francisco Early Music Society (SFEMS). Cole continued to work with SFEMS to present the event until 2018.

Cole retired from Cal Performances in 2009. He continued to contribute to the cultural community as member of SFEMS, as advisor on the launch of the Green Music Center in Sonoma, and as interim director of the Napa Valley Performing Arts Center in Yountville. He also continued to perform as guest conductor for a variety of national and international orchestras.

== Personal life ==
Cole was married three times and had two sons from his first marriage. In 2002, Cole married Susan Muscarella, a musician and the founder and executive director of the Jazzschool in Berkeley. She was on the search committee that was responsible for hiring Cole in 1989.

Cole died on July 11, 2026, at the age of 95 due to complications from a stroke.

== Awards and honors ==
In 1995, Cole was honored with the Chevalier of the Order of Arts and Letters from the French Ministry of Culture. In 1997, the University awarded Cole the Berkeley Citation. Cole also received the William Dawson Award from Programmatic Excellence from the Association of Performing Arts Presenters (APAP) in 1998.
