= La toison d'or =

La toison d'or is French for the Golden Fleece. It is the title of the following works:

- La toison d'or, a 1660 tragedy by Pierre Corneille
- La toison d'or (opera), a 1786 opera by Johann Christoph Vogel
