= Aryeh Nussbaum Cohen =

American countertenor (born 1994)

Aryeh Nussbaum Cohen (born 1994) is an American countertenor.

== Early life ==
Born and raised in Brooklyn, New York, Nussbaum Cohen grew up singing in the Brooklyn Youth Chorus and HaZamir, a Jewish international youth choir. He was an assistant cantor at East Midwood Jewish Center on Rosh Hashanah and Yom Kippur. He attended Fiorello H. LaGuardia High School, where he first began vocal studies, and he then attended Princeton University, where he majored in History (with a concentration in Intellectual and Cultural History) and minored in Vocal Performance and Judaic Studies.

== Career ==
=== Opera ===
While still a student at Princeton University, Nussbaum Cohen made his European debut at age 20, singing the lead role of Timante in the modern-day revival of Christoph Willibald Gluck's opera Demofoonte at the Theater an der Wien with Alan Curtis and Il Complesso Barocco. He went on to complete his training as a member of the Merola Opera Program at San Francisco Opera in 2016, the Houston Grand Opera Studio for 2017–18 (where he was the first countertenor in the Studio's history), and the Adler Fellowship Program at San Francisco Opera for 2018–19.

His operatic roles have included

- Giulio Cesare in Handel's Giulio Cesare in Egitto – Glyndebourne Festival (staged production), Moscow Chamber Orchestra, Russia (concert performance)
- Sesto in Handel's Giulio Cesare in Egitto – Teatro dell'Opera di Roma, Italy
- The Boy in George Benjamin's Written on Skin – Deutsche Oper Berlin, Germany
- Unulfo in Handel's Rodelinda – The English Concert, at Carnegie Hall, Shanghai Concert Hall, Incheon Arts Center, Los Angeles Opera, and Cal Performances
- Athamas in Handel's Semele – Glyndebourne Festival, United Kingdom
- David in Handel's Saul – Komische Oper Berlin, Germany and Houston Grand Opera, Texas
- Endimione in Francesco Cavalli's La Calisto – Bavarian State Opera, Munich
- Rosencrantz in Brett Dean's Hamlet – Metropolitan Opera, New York
- Prince Go-Go in György Ligeti's Le Grand Macabre – Radio Filharmonisch Orkest, Netherlands (concert performance)
- Oberon in Benjamin Britten's A Midsummer Night's Dream – Adelaide Festival, Australia
- Medoro in Handel's Orlando – San Francisco Opera, California
- Ottone in Handel's Agrippina – Ars Lyrica Houston, Texas
- Nireno in Handel's Giulio Cesare in Egitto – Houston Grand Opera, Texas
- Nerone and Ottone in Claudio Monteverdi's L'incoronazione di Poppea – Cincinnati Opera – Ohio, Princeton University
- Ismaël in Mikael Karlsson’s "Fanny and Alexander" for the world creation - La Monnaie/De Munt in Brussels in december 2024

=== Concert ===
Nussbaum Cohen's concert performances include the world premiere performances of Kenneth Fuchs' Poems of Life with the Virginia Symphony, led by JoAnn Falletta, which he then recorded with the London Symphony Orchestra. The album went on to win a 2019 Grammy Award.

He has performed works such as Carl Orff's Carmina Burana (with the Indianapolis Symphony led by Hans Graf, Bernstein's Chichester Psalms (with the Buffalo Philharmonic), Handel's Messiah (with the San Francisco Symphony, Saint Paul Chamber Orchestra, American Bach Soloists, and others), Handel's Saul and Theodora (with Philharmonia Baroque Orchestra and Nic McGegan and Richard Egarr), Handel's Jephtha (with Music of the Baroque and Dame Jane Glover), Bach's Christmas Oratorio (with the Portland Baroque Orchestra), and many others.

== Awards ==
In 2016–17, in addition to winning the Metropolitan Opera National Council Auditions Grand Finals, Nussbaum Cohen was first prize winner in the Houston Grand Opera Eleanor McCollum Competition and recipient of a Sara Tucker Study Grant from the Richard Tucker Music Foundation. He was first prize winner and Audience Choice Award recipient at the 2018 Dallas Opera Guild Vocal Competition, and he was third prize winner in the 2019 edition of Plácido Domingo’s Operalia. He was also winner of a 2019 William Matheus Sullivan Musical Foundation Award, a 2022 Career Grant from the Richard Tucker Music Foundation, and a 2023 George and Nora London Foundation Award.

His first commercial recording – the world premiere recording of Kenneth Fuchs' Poems of Life with the London Symphony Orchestra, conducted by JoAnn Falletta – won a 2019 GRAMMY Award in the Best Classical Compendium category.

During his senior year at Princeton University, he became the first singer in a decade to win the Princeton University Concerto Competition. Upon graduating in 2015, he was awarded the Isidore and Helen Sacks Memorial Prize for extraordinary achievement in the arts, granted each year to the student of greatest promise in the performance of classical music.

== Recordings ==
Nussbaum Cohen's discography includes the following:

- Uncharted, a solo CD of German lieder with John Churchwell, piano
- Hamor in Handel's Jephtha (Handel) with Jane Glover and Music of the Baroque
- St. John Passion with Nic McGegan and Cantata Collective
- David in Handel's Saul with Nic McGegan and Philharmonia Baroque Orchestra
- A solo CD of works by Gluck, Handel, and Vivaldi with American Bach Soloists
- Kenneth Fuchs' Poems of Life with JoAnn Falletta and the London Symphony Orchestra

== Personal life ==
Nussbaum Cohen currently resides in Northern California with his wife Abbi. He serves as Western Region Soloist Representative on the board of the American Guild of Musical Artists, the union that represents America's operatic, dance, and choral artists.
