= American Bach Soloists =

- Chamber orchestra on period instruments
- Short name: ABS
- Founded: 1989
- Location: San Francisco
- Principal conductor: Jeffrey Thomas
- Website: americanbach.org

The American Bach Soloists (ABS) is an American baroque orchestra based in the San Francisco Bay Area. The orchestra was founded in Belvedere, California, in 1989. Performers share music from Johann Sebastian Bach and his contemporaries during the Classical era, including Handel, Vivaldi, and Mozart, with modern audiences.

== History ==
Since 1998, ABS has performed Handel's Messiah at Grace Cathedral during the Christmas season.

In February 2020, ABS released a compilation album featuring Bach's cantatas and other early music pieces.

=== American Bach Soloists Academy ===
In 2010, ABS began hosting the American Bach Soloists Academy, an annual two-week summer training program at the San Francisco Conservatory of Music. Each year, more than 50 advanced students of early music convene for coaching, rehearsals, and classes. Following the academy, musicians publicly perform baroque selections as a part of the ABS Festival.

=== Music director ===
The American Bach Soloists are led by artistic and music director Jeffrey Thomas. Thomas is a conductor and tenor vocalist. He studied at the Oberlin Conservatory of Music, Manhattan School of Music, the Juilliard School of Music and at Cambridge University.

== Notable performers ==
- Aryeh Nussbaum Cohen

== Collaborations ==
- Performances at the Berkeley Festival and Exhibition
- Henry Purcell's opera Dido and Aeneas with the San Francisco Opera Center and The Crucible in Oakland, California
- Works by Claudio Monteverdi, George Frideric Handel's Dixit Dominus, and Virgil Thomson's Four Saints in Three Acts with the Mark Morris Dance Group
- George Frideric Handel's Music for the Royal Fireworks with laser lighting display by Lighting Systems Design, Orlando, Florida, in Grace Cathedral, San Francisco
