= Demofonte =

Italian libretto by Pietro Metastasio

Demofonte (also Demofoonte; Il Demofoonte; Demofoonte, ré di Tracia [King of Thrace]; Démophon; Demophontes; or Dirce, L'usurpatore innocente [Dirce, the Innocent Usurper]) is an opera seria libretto by Metastasio. The libretto was first set by Antonio Caldara in 1733, but remained popular throughout the eighteenth century and was set over seventy times.

== General information ==
- Title and title abbreviation: Demofoonte (Demof.) dramma per musica – dm
- Volume and page number in the Brunelli edition of Metastasio's works: I, 635
- Text incipit of the first line of the work: [Dircea:] "Credimi, o padre: ol tuo soverchio affetto"
- Composer of first setting: Antonio Caldara
- Place and date of first performance (or of completion): Vienna, Hoftheater, November 4, 1733
- Occasion for the first performance: Name-day of the Emperor Charles VI

== Other settings ==
The libretto, written in 1731 or 1733, became immensely popular. By 1800 it had inspired at least 73 operas (according to the Encyclopaedia Musical St. Petersburg: The 18th Century) Here is only the short list of the operas with the same title:

- Antonio Vivaldi, (Note: Authenticity is debated.) Demofoonte (RV deest; performance unknown)
- Felice Alessandri, Demofoonte (June 12, 1783 Padua)
- Pasquale Anfossi, Demofoonte (carnival 1773 Rome)
- Maksym Berezovsky, Demofonte (carnival February 1773 Livorno)
- Andrea Bernasconi, Demofoonte (carnival 1741 Rome)
- Francesco Bianchi (composer), Demofoonte (spring 1781 Genoa)
- Antonio Boroni, [Baroni, Borroni, Buroni, Burroni] Demofoonte (carnival 1762 Turin)
- Giuseppe Brivio, Demofoonte (carnival 1738 Turin)
- Francesco Ciampi, Demofoonte (February 5, 1735 Rome)
- Gioacchino Cocchi, Demofoonte (1754 Venice)
- Egidio Duni, Demofoonte (May 24, 1737 London)
- Johann Adolph Hasse, Demofoonte (1748)
- Baldassare Galuppi, Demofoonte (December 18, 1749 Madrid)
- Christoph Willibald Gluck, Demofoonte (January 6, 1743 Milan)
- Niccolò Jommelli, Demofoonte (1770 Naples)
- Francesco Mancini, Il Demofoonte (1735, Naples) [together with D. Sarro and F. Leo]
- Josef Mysliveček, Demofoonte, first setting, (carnival) 1769 Venice
- Josef Mysliveček, Demofoonte, second setting, birthday of King Charles III of Spain, 20 January 1775 Naples
- Giovanni Paisiello, Demofoonte (carnival 1775 Venice)
- Antonio Pampani, Demofoonte (carnival 1757 Rome)
- Davide Perez, Demofoonte (1752 Lisbon)
- Brizio Petrucci, Demofoonte (December 26, 1765 Ferrara)
- Niccolò Piccinni, Demofoonte (May 1761 Reggio Emilia)
- Giuseppe Sarti [Sardi], Demofoonte (January 30, 1771 Copenhagen, carnival 1782 Rome)
- Gaetano Maria Schiassi, Il Demofoonte (carnival 1735 Venice)
- Joseph Schuster, Demofoonte (1776 Forlì)
- Angelo Tarchi, Demofoonte (September 1786 Crema, 1786 Milan)
- Tommaso Traetta, Demofoonte (Autumn 1758 Verona)
- Francesco Uttini, Demofoonte (c. 1750 Ferrara)
- Mattia Vento, Demofoonte (March 2, 1765 London
- Marcos Portugal (Marco Portogallo), Demofoonte (February 8, 1794 Milan, La Scala)
- Marcos Portugal (Marco Portogallo), Il Demofoonte Rev. (August 15, 1808 Lisbon, S. Carlos);

See also operas by Leonardo Leo, Carl Heinrich Graun, Niccolò Jommelli, Johann Adolph Hasse, Luigi Cherubini. Composers such as Wolfgang Amadeus Mozart used Metastasio's text and set it to music individually, in the form of concert arias. Mozart's settings include:

- Aria for tenor "Ah più non tremar non voglio" in F major, K. 71 (fragment)
- Aria for soprano "In te spero, o sposo amato" in C major, K. 440
- Aria for soprano "Non curo l'affetto" in E major, K. 74b
- Aria for soprano "Se tutti i mali miei" in E-flat major, K. 83
- Recitative and aria for soprano "Misero me...Misero pargoletto" in E-flat major, K. 77

== Roles ==
- Demofoonte
- Dircea
- Creusa
- Timante
- Cherinto
- Matusio
- Adrasto
- Olinto

== Synopsis ==
The Thracian king Demofonte asks the oracle of Apollo how long the practice of the annual sacrifice of a virgin will continue. The answer is puzzling: "as long as the innocent usurper sits on the throne". The nobleman Matusio tries to protect his daughter Dircea from being sacrificed. He and Demofonte are unaware that Dircea is secretly married to Timante, the son of Demofonte and the heir to the throne. Demofonte wants Timante to marry Creusa, a princess of Phrygia. Timante's younger brother Cherinto is accompanying her to the kingdom of Thrace, however he falls in love with her. Meeting Creusa, Timante admits that he can't marry her, but does not explain why.

Dircea has been caught while trying to flee the country and imprisoned, and Demofonte orders the immediate sacrifice of Dircea. Timante tries to release her but with no success. He is also imprisoned. Creusa asks Demofonte for mercy. The king releases Timante and Dircea, and Timante decides to give up the throne in favour of Cherinto.

Suddenly they find a letter revealing that Dircea is the daughter of Demofonte, which makes Timante and Dircea brother and sister. Timante is in despair, and tries to avoid Dircea. However another letter reveals that Timante is the son of Matusio. Everybody is happy. The marriage of Timante and Dircea becomes legal, and Cherinto is the real crown prince and can marry Creusa. No more virgins are sacrificed, since Timante is no longer the "innocent usurper of the throne".

== Settings of individual arias ==
- Franz Schubert, Aria di Timante (Act III, scene 5): "Misero pargoletto" (D 42).
