= Berkeley Festival and Exhibition =

Music festival in Berkeley California

- Genre: Early Music
- Dates: June every other year
- Locations: San Francisco Bay Area, California, United States
- Years active: 1990-present
- Organised by: SFEMS
- Website: berkeleyfestival.org

The Berkeley Festival and Exhibition (BFX) is a week long, biennial early music festival held in the San Francisco Bay Area in California, United States. BFX is currently produced by the non-profit organization San Francisco Early Music Society (SFEMS).

Founded in 1990 by Robert Cole, then-director of Cal Performances, the festival started as a mirror event to take place during Boston Early Music Festival and Exhibition's off-years at the University of California, Berkeley. The event promotes historically informed performance, focuses on the works from the Medieval, Renaissance, and baroque periods, and features local and international performers.

Beyond the main stage and exhibitions, the Berkeley Early Music Festival promotes community participants through its "Fringe" program. The Fringe is a platform for self-produced concerts by Bay Area soloists and ensembles, and provides a performance outlet for a diverse range of artists, including recreational and educational groups, amateurs, pre-professionals, and rising stars.

In 2004 and 2008, during periods of financial stress, the California state's university system (Cal Performances' underwriter and the festival primary sponsor) was forced to withdraw. The festival experienced a downturn. The increased costs to use campus room forced all events (main, fringe and exhibition) to move off-campus to venues like the First Congregational Church of Berkeley. Later, the larger-scale productions were put on hold.

Today, the festival's main stage is still in Berkeley, California. Exhibitions and marketplace for period instruments, special events, as well as the fringe are also held in the nearby cities of San Francisco or Palo Alto.
