= Michèl Yost =

French clarinetist

Michèl Yost (Paris, 1754 – Paris, July 5, 1786) was a French clarinetist and cofounder of the French clarinet school. He was a brilliant instrumentalist and even known beyond the boundaries of France.

Yost was a friend of Johann Christoph Vogel. Joseph Beer (1744–1811) was Yost's teacher. Yost himself was a clarinet teacher counting famous clarinetists such as Xavier Lefèvre amongst his pupils.

== Compositions ==
Although most compositions were published under his own name, some are the result of a cooperation with other musicians such as Johann Christoph Vogel. Some of his concertos have been recorded by Dieter Klöcker.

- Concerto No. 1
- Concerto No. 2 in B♭
- Concerto No. 3 in B♭
- Concerto No. 4
- Concerto No. 5 in E♭
- Concerto No. 6
- Concerto No. 7 in B♭ major for clarinet and orchestra ("de Michel et Vogel")
- Concerto No. 8 in E♭ major for clarinet and orchestra ("de Michel et Vogel")
- Concerto No. 9 in B♭ major for clarinet and orchestra ("de Michel et Vogel")
- Concerto No. 10 in B♭ ("de Michel et Vogel")
- Concerto No. 11 in B♭ major for Clarinet and Orchestra ("de Michel et Vogel")
- Concerto No. 12 in B♭ ("de Michel et Vogel")
- Concerto No. 13 ("de Michel et Vogel")
- Concerto No. 14 in E♭ ("de Michel et Vogel")
- Duo Concertante for 2 clarinets
- 12 Grand Solos or Studies
- Airs variés
- Duos, Opp. 1, 2, 3, 4, and 7
- 6 Duos, Op. 5
- 6 Duos, Op. 6
- 6 Duos, Op. 8 for clarinet and violin
- 6 Duos, Op. 9 for clarinet and violin
- 6 Duos, Op. 10
- 6 Favorite Duets, Op. 12
- 3 Trios for flute, clarinet and bassoon
- 3 Trios for 2 clarinets and cello
- 3 Trios for clarinet, violin and cello
- Airs variés for clarinet, viola, and cello
- 5 Quartets, with Vogel
- 6 Quartets, with Vogel, Opp. 1, 2, 3, 4, and 5

== Discography ==
- Dieter Klöcker, Michèl Yost, Concertos for Clarinet and Orchestra, MDGL MDG 301 0718-2, © 1997, (p) 1997
