= Johann Nicolaus Mempel =

German musician

Johann Nicolaus Mempel (variants: Nikolaus, Mempell, Mämpel) (10 December 1713 – 26 February 1747) was a German musician.

He was born in Heyda (now part of Ilmenau, Thuringia). From 1740 to his death, he was cantor in Apolda. Along with Johann Gottlieb Preller, he copied one of the most important manuscript collections of the organ and keyboard music of Johann Sebastian Bach, known as the Mempell-Preller-Handschrift.

He may have come into contact with Bach's music when he was a student of Johann Peter Kellner or through Johann Gottfried Walther, though it is not known for certain.
