= Giovanni Carestini =

Italian opera singer

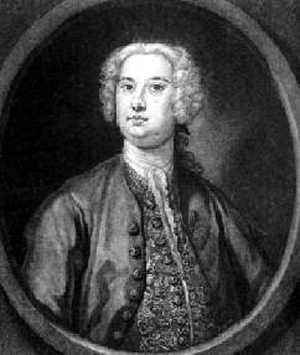
Carestini

Giovanni Carestini (13 December 1700 in Filottrano, near Ancona – 1759 in Bologna) was an Italian castrato of the 18th century, who sang in the operas and oratorios of George Frideric Handel. He is also remembered as having sung for Johann Adolf Hasse and Christoph Willibald Gluck.

== Career ==
Giovanni Carestini was born on 13 December 1700 in Filottrano. He was the son of Marco Felice Carestini and Vittoria Costantini. He was baptized two days after his birth by Don Nicola Gentiloni, provost of the Church of Santa Maria Assunta in Filottrano. In that occasion it was given the name Giovanni Maria Bernardino. The godfathers of his baptism were Felice Lancioni and Olimpia Felice Gentiloni, wife of Alessandro Gentiloni, a noble man of Filottrano. Since he was a child he had an exquisite and sweet voice. Carestini's career began in Milan in 1719, patronised at the time by the Cusani family (hence the alternative name Cusanino). He sang for Alessandro Scarlatti in Rome in 1721. The scope of his burgeoning career quickly began to expand; he was at the Viennese court during 1723, and followed this up with performances in Naples, Venice and Rome again, singing in operas by Hasse, Leonardo Vinci, and Nicola Porpora. He created the role of Arbace in Vinci and Metastasio's Artaserse, which is known for its difficult and virtuosic arias. He sang in Munich in 1731 before coming to London to sing for Handel in 1733.

For Handel he sang the main roles in Arianna in Creta, Ariodante, and Alcina, and also performed in the oratorios Deborah, Esther, and Athalia. While in Naples in 1735, he commanded a fee higher than that of the renowned Caffarelli. Charles Burney records an entertaining anecdote from this time:

Verdi prati, which was constantly encored during the whole run of Alcina, was, at first, sent back to HANDEL by Carestini, as unfit for him to sing; upon which he went, in a great rage, to his house, and in a way which few composers, except HANDEL, ever ventured to accost a first-singer, cries out: "You toc! don't I know better as your seluf, vaat is pest for you to sing? If you vill not sing all de song vaat I give you, I will not pay you ein stiver."

Following this peak, Carestini's career began to wane quickly. A London audience of 1740 was indifferent, and he returned to Italy in the early 1740s (singing in Gluck's Demofoonte in Milan in 1743), but was an employee of Maria Theresa by 1744. From 1747 to 1749 he sang for Hasse in Dresden, and then moved to Berlin (1750–54), and then St Petersburg (1754–56). Audiences in Naples were actively displeased by his performances in 1758, and Carestini seems to have died not long after. One of his last appearances was portraying the title role in the world premiere of Gaetano Latilla's Ezio at the Teatro di San Carlo on 10 July 1758.

== Voice and reputation ==
The range of Carestini's voice changed throughout his career - he began as a "powerful and clear soprano" (according to Burney), but later descended to "the fullest, finest, and deepest counter-tenor that has perhaps ever been heard" (again according to Burney). He was held in high regard by many critics across Europe. Hasse commented that "He who has not heard Carestini is not acquainted with the most perfect style of singing", while Johann Joachim Quantz remarked that "He had extraordinary virtosity in brilliant passages, which he sang in chest voice, conforming to the principles of the school of Bernacchi and the manner of Farinelli". He was also reputed to be a fine actor, and was furthermore noted for his striking good looks. As a mark of his continuing impact upon operatic history, in 2007 French counter-tenor Philippe Jaroussky released a CD tribute to Carestini, composed largely of arias written for Carestini's voice.
