= Maxim Berezovsky =

Classical-period composer (c.1745–1777)

- Максим Березовский
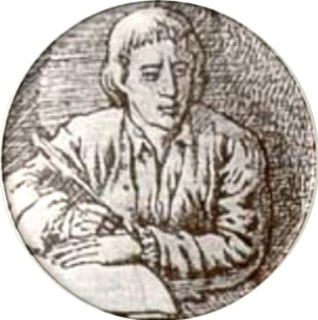
- A 20th-century portrait of Berezovsky
- Born: c. 1745; Glukhov, Cossack Hetmanate, Russian Empire
- Died: 2 April [O.S. 24 March] 1777; Saint Petersburg, Russian Empire
- Era: Classical

Maxim Sozontovich Berezovsky (Note: Alternative transliterations of his name include Maksym and Sozontovych.) (Russian: Максим Созонтович Березовский; Ukrainian: Максим Созонтович Березовський; c. 1745 – 2 April [O.S. 24 March] 1777) was a composer of secular and liturgical music, and a conductor and opera singer, who worked at the Saint Petersburg Court Chapel in the Russian Empire, but who also spent much of his career in Italy. He made an important contribution to the music of Ukraine. Together with Artemy Vedel and Dmitry Bortniansky, both of whom have cited him as an influence, Berezovsky is considered by musicologists as one of the three great composers of 18th-century Ukrainian classical music, and one of the Russian Empire's first composers.

Berezovsky's place of birth and his father's name are known only from verbal accounts. He is traditionally thought to have been educated at the Hlukhiv Musical School; he may have also attended the Kyiv-Mohyla Academy, although this is uncertain. In 1758, he was accepted as a singer into the capella at Oranienbaum, before being employed at the imperial court of Catherine II in Saint Petersburg, where he received lessons from the Italian composer Baldassare Galuppi. In 1769, Berezovsky was sent to study in Bologna. There he composed secular works, including Demofonte, a three-act opera seria that was the earliest Italian-style opera to be written by a Ukrainian or a Russian composer. He returned to Saint Petersburg in October 1773. The circumstances of his death in 1777 are not documented.

Berezovsky is best known for his choral works, and was one of the creators of the Ukrainian sacred choral style. Few of his compositions are extant, but research in recent decades led to the rediscovery of previously lost works, including three symphonies. His opera and violin sonata were the first known examples of these genres by an Imperial Russian composer.

== Biography ==
A lack of documentary evidence meant that little was known about Maxim Sozontovich Berezovsky until the 21st century. During the 1830s and 1840s, the librarians of the St. Petersburg State Academic Capella compiled details about his life and work. They had access to the composer's own scores and notes, but relied on anecdotal information from others who remembered him. The earliest writers to produce short biographies of Berezovsky were the German historiographer Jacob von Stehlin, the antiquary and book collector Eugene Bolkhovitinov, and the Russian poet and translator Nikolai Dmitrievich Gorchakov. Bolkhovitinov's unsubstantiated biography, written decades after Berezovsky's death, was used by later writers as the main source of information about the composer. Unconfirmed details still included in modern biographies include that he was a victim of his circumstances who was driven to suicide, either by debt or the lack of recognition of his creative genius.

=== Early life ===
Berezovsky's father may have belonged to the petty nobility. Contemporary descendants of a brother, Pavel, associate the family's origins with the Cossacks. The family's coat of arms has also been preserved, testifying to its Polish origins.

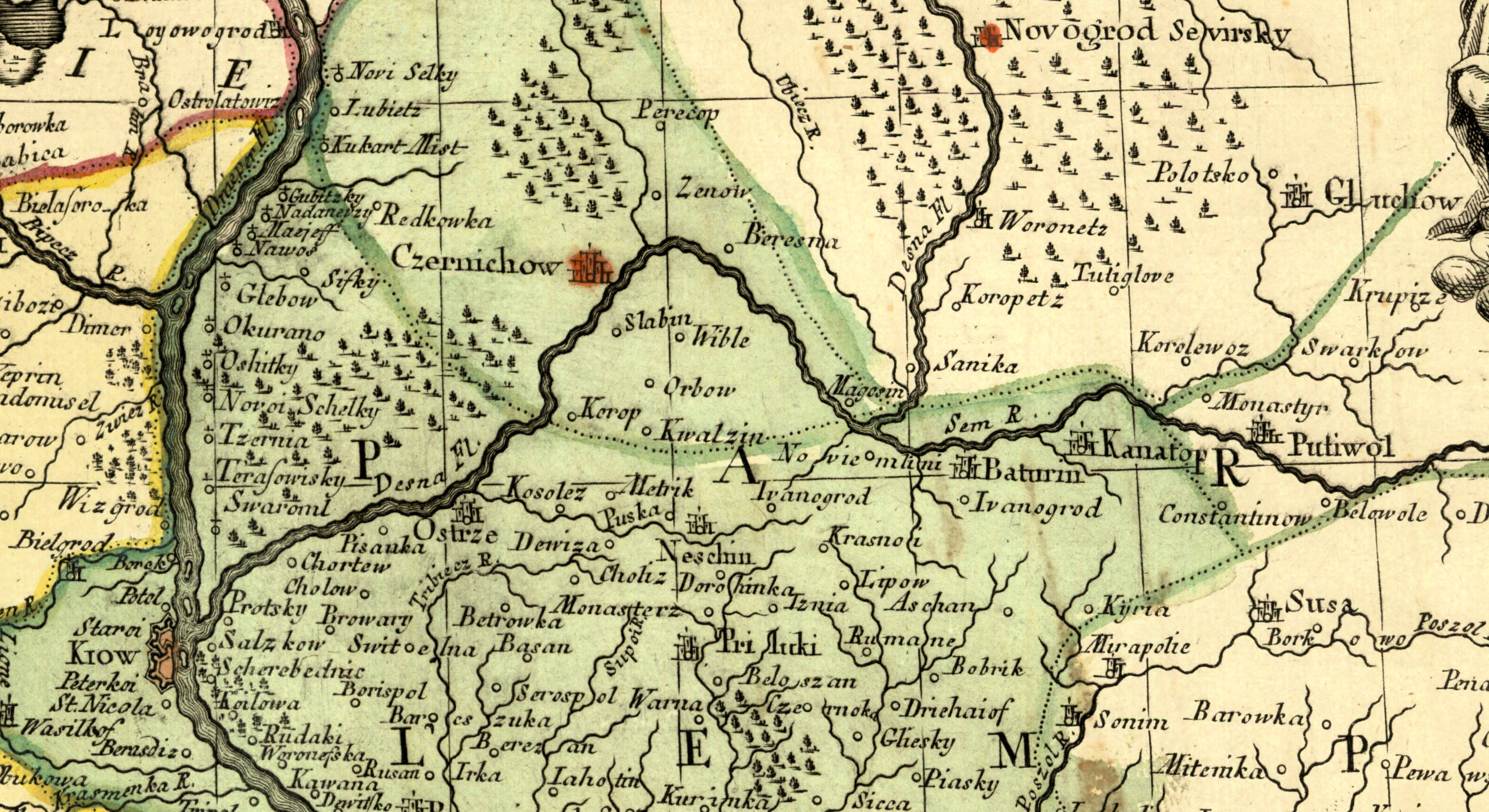
A part of a map, produced in 1769 by Johann Gottlieb Facius. Kyiv (labelled "Kiow") and Hlukhiv ("Gluchow") are shown on the left and right sides respectively.

Berezovsky's place of birth, father's name, and supposed period as a scholar at the Kyiv-Mohyla Academy in Kyiv, are known only from verbal accounts, and so are not known for certain. Once-accepted aspects of his life story originate from a largely fictional play by Peter Smirnov, written in 1841, as well as from a novel written in 1844 by the Russian writer Nestor Kukolnik.

It was in the past believed that Berezovsky was born on 27 April [O.S. 16 April] 1745, as recalled by a teacher in the Capella in Saint Petersburg. Other 19th-century sources cite different years: 1743, 1742, and even 1725. Since being stated by an encyclopedic dictionary, published in 1836, that Berezovsky was born in around 1745, this year has become the accepted year of his birth. The month and the day of his birth appeared in works by Mikhail Lebedev and Mikhail Solovyov respectively. It is unclear where their information originated from.

Berezovsky's birthplace is unknown for certain, but according to many sources was Glukhov, at that time the main residence of the Hetman of Zaporizhian Host. During the 18th century, Glukhov served as the capital of the Cossack Hetmanate and the administrative centre of the Little Russia Governorate.

=== Education in Glukhov and Kiev ===
During the 18th century, as choirs arose in Ukrainian churches, monasteries and schools, composers and singers raised choral music to a high artistic and professional level. In contrast to the Italian practice of employing castrati, the all-male Capella used boy sopranos. Ukraine became known as a place to recruit boys with excellent singing voices, and from the 1730s, Russian nobles brought talented youngsters from the region with them to perform at the Capella. From 1738, the Glukhov Singing School was used by the Capella to provide boys with their initial training, before those that were selected were coached as singers at the court in Saint Petersburg. When their voices changed, those with the best voices were then trained as adult singers, and freed if they were serfs. Those not selected generally found work as government employees, or choristers in monasteries.

Berezovsky is generally considered to have been a boy chorister at the school in Glukhov. His name does not appear in surviving documents of this institution, but as it was the only one in the Russian Empire that trained singers for the Imperial Court Choir, it is likely that he was educated there, as were other composers such as Artemy Vedel, Hryhorii Skovoroda, and Gavrilo Rachinsky. He may have composed three- and four-part motets as a boy.

It was asserted by some 19th-century sources that Berezovsky received part of his education at the Kyiv-Mohyla Academy, but when the academy's documents were made public at the start of the 20th century, Berezovsky's name was not found amongst any of the student lists. There is no documentary confirmation of Berezovsky attending the academy.

=== Oranienbaum, and Saint Petersburg ===
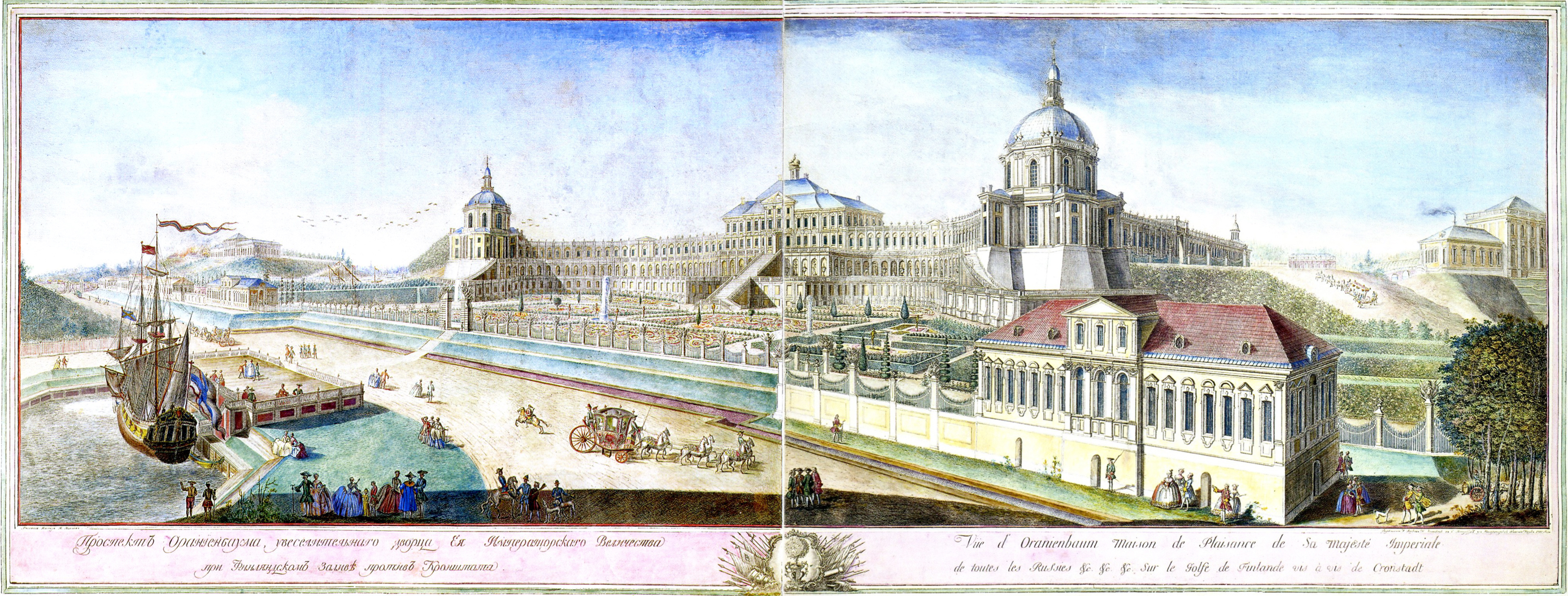
Prospect of the Grand Palace in Oranienbaum, based on a drawing by Mikhail Makhaev (1750s), Hermitage Museum

On 29 June 1758, Berezovsky was accepted as a singer into the capella of the future Paul I of Russia, in Oranienbaum, near Saint Petersburg. There he sang in Italian operas and his name appears in printed librettos of the operas Alessandro nell'Indie (1759) by Francesco Araja (when he played the role of Poro) and La Semiramide riconosciuta (1760) by Vincenzo Manfredini (when he portrayed Ircano). (Note: Berezovsky's date of birth was calculated by whether his voice had broken by 1757. There was once doubt as to whether the roles he sang were for a soprano or a tenor.) Some 1756 salary receipts are preserved, signed by "Beresevsky", that confirm that he was a paid as an opera singer at the Oranienbaum.

The future governor of Little Russia, Pyotr Rumyantsev, brought the 13-year-old Berezovsky to the royal court. He was employed at the court for 19 years, as an opera singer (until 1765), a musician in the orchestra (from 1766) and a composer (from 1774). In 1762, he became a singer of the Italian Saint Petersburg Court Capella. He was taught to compose and play the harpsichord by the Italian conductor Francesco Tsoppis, and was taught composing by the Italian composer Baldassare Galuppi. Berezovsky surprised Tsoppis when he created a series of well-written choral concerts. With Dmitry Bortniansky, he took part in a performance of Hermann Raupach's Alceste in Saint Petersburg.

During the 1760s, Berezovsky was a court staff-musician and composed concertos for church choirs. Influenced by the sacred concertos created by Italians at court, Berezovsky's new music in the Italian style was well received. He no longer sang as a principal after Catherine II became empress in 1762, perhaps because of his age, or because Russian musicians lost favour at court during her rule.

==== Married life ====
In 1763, at the age of 18, Berezovsky married a girl he had known since his days at Oranienbaum, a court ballerina named Franzina Uberscher, who was the daughter of one of the court orchestra's horn players. Berezovsky belonged to the Russian Orthodox Church, and Franzina was a Roman Catholic, so permission had to be sought for the marriage. Having worked for 11 years as a dancer in the court theatre, in 1774, she was dismissed due to her age.

According to the conductor musicologist Mstyslav Yurchenko, Berezovsky had another wife named Nadiya Matviivna, but the Ukrainian musicologist Olga Shumilina asserts that Franzina changed her name when she married into the Orthodox Church.

It is not known for certain why, shortly after Berezovsky's death, a court employee received a payment from the imperial treasury that would normally have been given to his wife, who was still alive. A year after her husband's death, Nadiya Matviivna, left without means of subsistence, died in poverty. The death certificate, dated 1 January 1778, named her as the wife of Berezovsky, a chamber orchestra musician.

=== First Italian trip ===
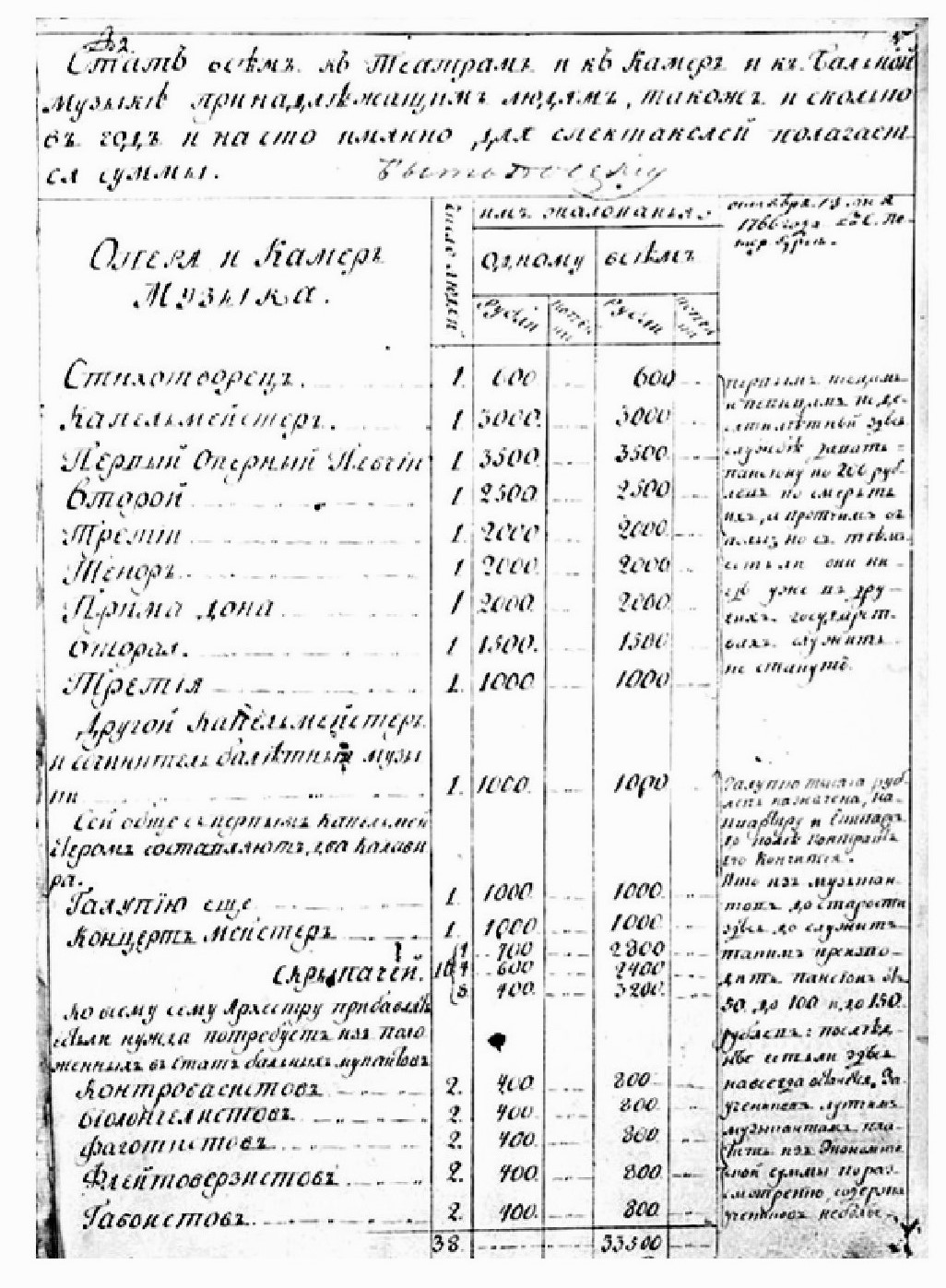
The record of Berezovky's position as a court composer in Saint Petersburg

It is unclear exactly when or how often Berezovsky went to Italy, but there is evidence he may travelled there more than once. An imperial document exists concerning two passports issued on 26 August 1764 to persons from Little Russia sent to Italy at the private expense of Kirill Razumovsky, the last Hetman of the Zaporizhian Host. One of the passports is thought to have been for Berezovsky. Razumovsky had taken him from Glukhov to St. Petersburg in late 1757. He acted as his mentor, and assisted him financially. The passport document read: "In Little Russia to Kiev to the Little Russian nobleman Maxim Berezevsky and the merchant Ivan Konstantinov, sent by His Eminence Hetman Count Razumovsky to Italy". The indication that Berezovsky was a nobleman reveals that he probably had certain privileges, and a good salary. Shumilina states that the passport may not have been for Berezovsky, as the name "Beresevsky" is not the same as "Berezovsky".

After his return from Italy, Berezovsky was hired as the deputy director of the Capella, with an annual salary of 500 rubles. His duties included writing operatic ballet music. This position is shown in a list of theatre employees that was made in 1766. His sacred choral concerts was performed in August 1766 in the Amber Room of the Tsarskoye Selo Palace in the presence of Catherine II. Five more concerts were written during the next two years and were praised by Italian musicians (including Galuppi) and courtiers alike.

=== Return to Italy ===
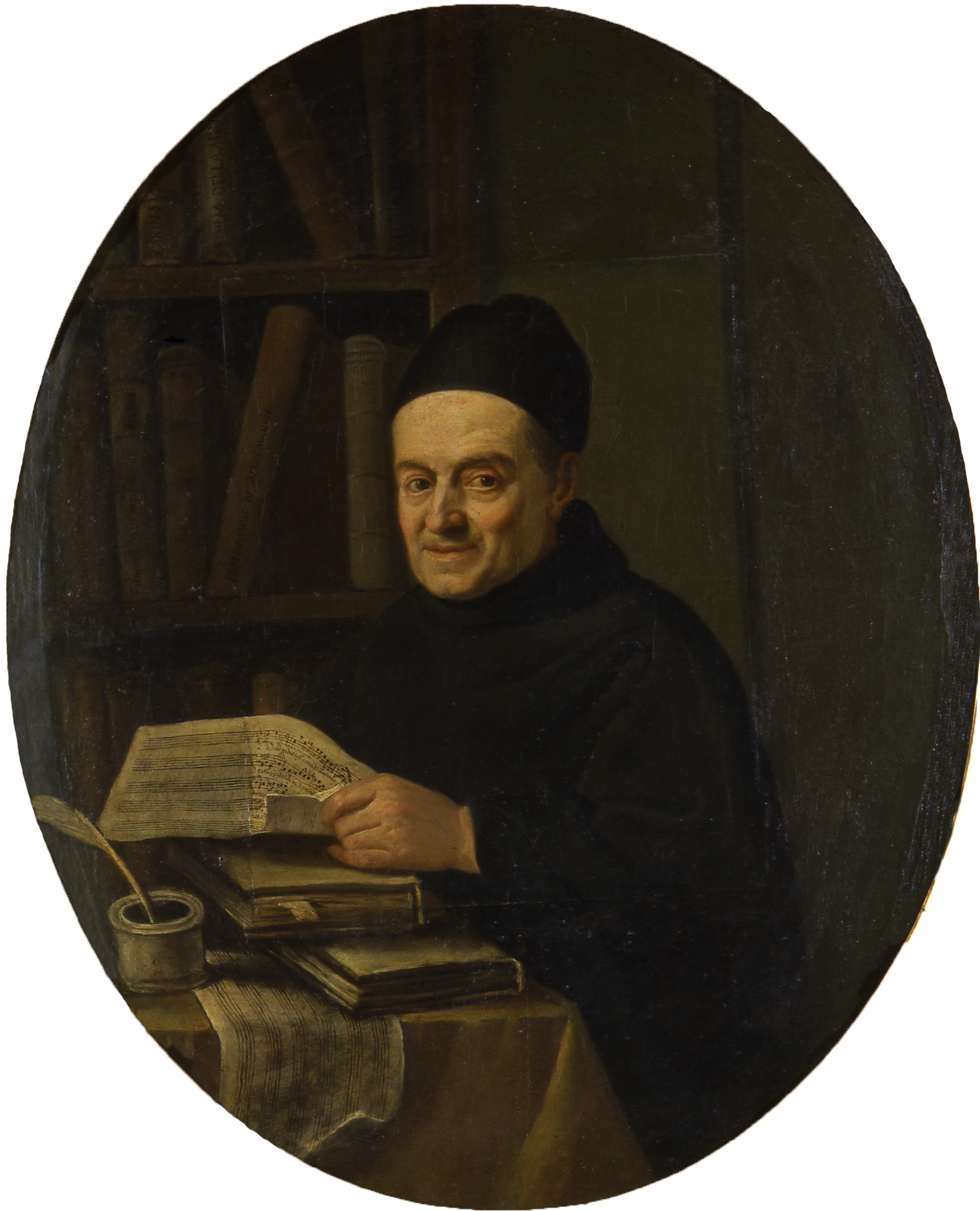
Giovanni Battista Martini, Berezovsky's instructor at the Bologna Academy of Music

In 1769, Berezovsky, by then in his late twenties, made a return trip to Italy. He travelled first to Vienna, as a courier to the ambassador Dmytro Golitsyn, as stated in a border crossing document dated 26 May. From there he went to Bologna. There he studied with the composer Giovanni Battista Martini at the Accademia Filarmonica di Bologna. He stayed in Italy until 1773.

Berezovsky did not have the necessary letter of introduction for Martini. The letter was sent to Martini in February 1770 by the director of the Russian imperial theatres, Ivan Yelagin, by which time Berezovsky was already in Bologna and had begun classes. Shumilina has proposed that the appearance of Berezovsky in Italy (at a time when Russia and the Ottoman Empire were at war) was not initially so that he could be taught by Martini, and that the Russian authorities used Berezovsky's tuition as a cover, so that he could act as a government agent.

In May 1771, Berezovsky formally requested to be allowed to take the graduation exam: (Note: "15 Maggio 1771. Illustrimo Signor Principe e Accademici filarmonici...Massimo Beresovskoy detto Russo desiderando di essere aggregato in gualetà di Compositore e Maestro di Capella dell'Accademia Celeberrima de filarmonici, suplica in Signor Principe, et Accademia de filarmonici di ameterlo all esperimento, ad aggregazione dell'Accademia. Che della grazia qua deus.")

May 15, 1771: Venerable Signor President and Professors of the Academy. Maxim Berezovsky, nicknamed The Russian, wishing to be admitted to the ranks of composers and conductors of the most famous Philharmonic Academy, asks the Signor President and members of the Philharmonic Academy to admit him to the exam for admission to the Academy. To the glory of the Lord.

— Maxim Berezovsky

Along with fellow graduate Josef Mysliveček, (Note: By 1771, Josef Mysliveček had composed nine operas, more than 30 symphonies and overtures, three concerts, and many other chamber works.) Berezowsky had to compose a polyphonic work on a given theme. This was a similar exam to the one given to the 14-year-old Wolfgang Amadeus Mozart a year earlier. Academicians gathered to test the applicants, who assessed the candidates' examination pieces by secret ballot, using white and black balls to vote that the required standard had been reached. Unusually, both Mysliveček and Berezovsky received only white balls—which signified a positive vote—and so both became academicians. This brought them financial and social benefits. Berezowsky's examination piece, Hic vir despiciens, signed "Massimo Berezovsky", is now kept by the academy. Berezovsky's compositions in Italy include Demofonte, a three-act opera seria, with an Italian libretto by Pietro Metastasio. It was staged in Livorno and premiered in February 1773. The music he composed in Italy had to be published in France, as during his lifetime, neither Russia or Italy regularly published printed music. Berezovsky became the first Russian member of the Academia Filarmonica di Bologna.

=== Return to Saint Petersburg ===
Having run out of funds, Berezovsky returned to Saint Petersburg in October 1773, (Note: Early biographies indicate that he returned in 1775.) and was put in charge of the choir in which he had been trained. His allowance for his years in Italy was paid only in 1774, upon his return to Russia.

As his duties involved writing and performing music, Berezovsky is referred to as a composer in some documents. However, no compositions or records of his employment at court from this period have survived. It is probable that he had no permanent position, and that following his return from Italy, his composing career effectively stopped. He was never promoted again.

=== Death ===
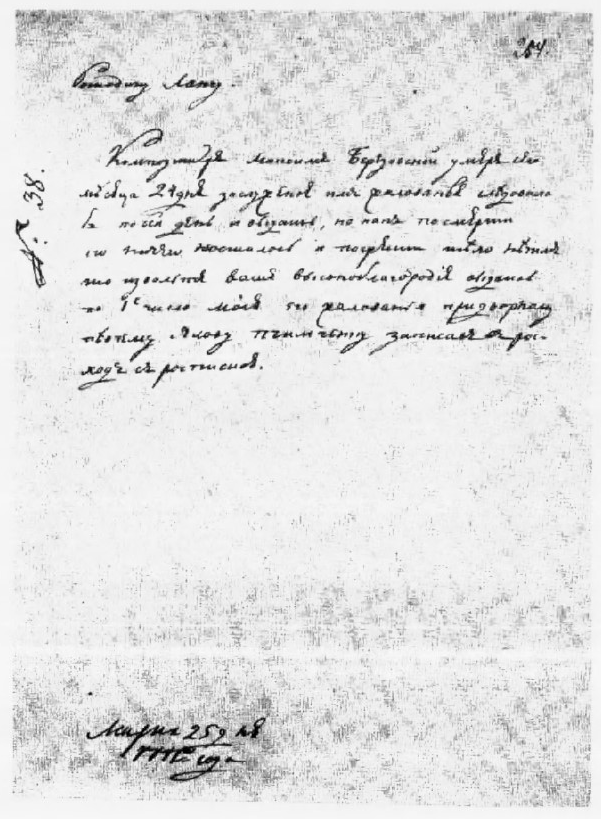
The document relating to Berezovsky's burial

Berezovsky received his last salary in February 1777. The Russian statesman Grigory Potemkin invited him to work as the director of a music academy in Kremenchuk (now in modern Ukraine), but on 24 March (2 April N.S.) 1777, Berezovsky died in Saint Petersburg.

Over time, the details of Berezovsky's death were embellished, for instance relating that he became alcoholic, and committed suicide. No records to indicate that he died by this means are known. He is finally mentioned after his death, when the issue of his estate is discussed: "Composer Maxim Berezovsky died on the 24th day of this month; The salary he was owed is due to be paid, but since there is nothing left after his death, and there is nothing to bury the body, then please, your highness, give his salary to the court singer Yakov Timchenko...." According to Muzyka and The Day, the story that Catherine II secretly ordered the papers in Berezovsky's rooms to be burnt after his death are among the "myths and legends" surrounding his biography.

Bolkhovitinov wrote in his 1804 biography of Berezovsky that "hypochondria" caused Berezovsky to "stab himself to death". His suicide, taken as fact from the early 19th century, may have happened because of debt problems, as opposed to earlier theories such as his supposed poor treatment by the imperial court. According to the Russian and Israeli musicologist Marina Ritzarev, Berezovsky died of a fever.

== Works ==
Most of Berezovsky's compositions are lost. Of the 18 choral concertos he wrote, three are extant, of which only one autograph score, the antiphony he wrote during his exam for election to the Academy of Music, is known. Of the 40 choral works recorded during the 19th century, approximately half have been lost.

In 1901, the music encyclopedia Riemann Musiklexikon referred to "not only the Demofonte opera, but also other secular works" by the composer that had been written in Italy. The description of Berezovsky as a composer of sacred music who occasionally produced secular works has since been challenged by some modern scholars. His opera Demofonte and his violin sonata are the first examples of these genres by either a Ukrainian or a Russian composer.

=== Sacred music ===
Berezovsky became famous for his choral works. The style of his choral concertos influenced later composers such as Bortniansky and Vedel. His most well-known choral works are the concerto "Ne otverzhi mene vo vremya starosti" ("Do Not Forsake Me in My Old Age"), considered by musicologists to be his last composition, liturgical music for the Lord's Prayer and the Credo, and four communion hymns: "Chashu spaseniia" ("Chalice of Salvation"), "V pamiat' vichnuiu" ("In Eternal Memory"), "Tvoriai anhely svoia" ("Let the Angels Create"), and "Vo vsiu zemliu" ("Over All the Land"). They are related to Ukrainian folk songs and to the tradition of Kievan chant. "Do Not Forsake Me in My Old Age" was first published in 1817. It is sung regularly by Russian and Ukrainian choirs. Some of Berezovsky's communion hymns are lost, and it is possible that of those that are extant, some were not composed by him.

Berezovsky was one of the creators of the Ukrainian choral style in sacred music, and the first composer to divide the Orthodox Liturgy into seven parts, providing each of them with a distinctive role. His settings are notable for their expressive melodies, which contain hints of Ukrainian folk songs. He originated the use of the folk tradition of homophonic choral recitation in the genre.

Lidiya Korniy writes that Berezovsky raised the genre of sacred concertos to the highest musical and artistic level. According to Yurchenko, the quality of some of Berezovsky's liturgical works is "unparalleled not only in Ukrainian but in European music". Prior to 2018, three choral concertos were attributed to Berezovsky, written during his second period in Saint Petersburg. Berezovsky created the four-movement classical choral concerto.

In 2001, some of Berezovsky's choral works were found in Kyiv, where following the end of World War II they had been placed in the care of the Kyiv Conservatory, before being moved to the Central State Archive of Ukraine. In 2018, a volume of newly discovered choral concerti by Berezovsky, nine for four voices, and three for double-choir, were published, nearly all for the first time.

=== Secular music ===
==== Demofonte ====
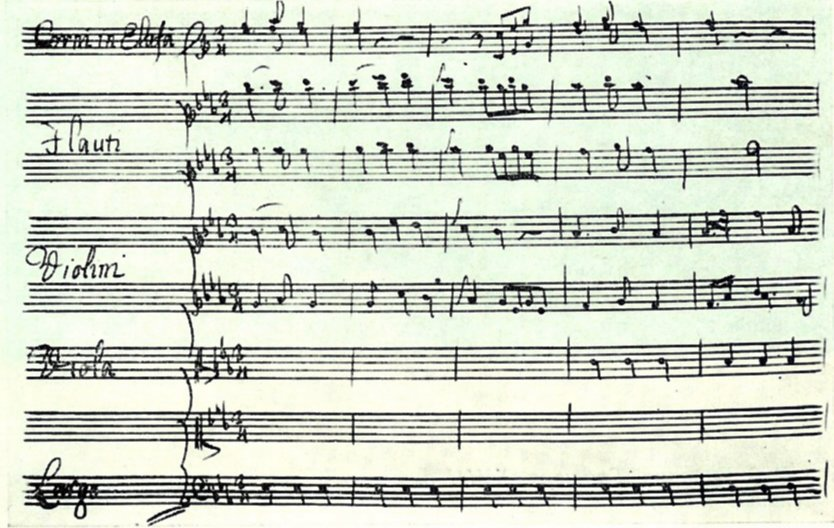
A fragment of Berezovky's manuscript from the score of his opera Demofonte (1773)

Berezovsky's opera Demofonte was commissioned and paid for by the Russian statesman Count Alexei Grigoryevich Orlov, who was stationed with his squadron in Livorno. The opera was staged during the town's annual carnival in February 1773, and was well received.

Four arias, discovered in a music library in Florence, have survived: Mentre il cor con meste voci, Misero pargoletto, Per lei fra l'armi, and Prudente mi chiedi. The two arias each for Demophoön (tenor) and Timanthes (castrato)—were in a copyist's score. Timanthes' arias, Misero pargoletto and Prudente mi chiedi?, contain da capo sections in the style of Niccolò Jommelli. Their quality testifies to the composer's experience of the opera seria genre.

The opera was performed both in Livorno and Florence, according to two accounts of productions found in "Notizie del mondo" published in Livorno on 27 February 1773. They show that Demofonte was performed as part of Livorno's town carnival, as well as in a Florentine theatre. An entry listing the opera was also found in the Milanese "Index of Theatre Performances for 1773".

The autograph manuscripts from Demofonte are held in the library of the Conservatorio Luigi Cherubini. Sergei Diaghilev, the founder of the Ballets Russes, was prevented from reviving the opera, as so much was lost.

==== Violin sonata ====
Berezovsky's symphony in C major and the sonata for violin and harpsichord in C major both have a cyclical structure and are written in an early sonata form, a musical style that is positioned somewhere between the Baroque and Classical styles of music.

The sonata (1772), composed when he was in Pisa, contains both Italian and Ukrainian elements. The influence of Ukrainian folk songs is found in the third movement, and the work incorporates the melody to a traditional folk song, "The Cossack Rode beyond the Danube". The complexity of the violin part shows that Berezovsky was able to play the instrument at a professional level.

The piece consists of three movements:

1. Allegro
2. Grave
3. Minuet con 6 variazioni

The manuscript score, along with many other culturally important documents and objects, was taken by Napoleon Bonaparte's army to Paris. In 1974, the work was mentioned in an account of Berezovsky's life by the musicologist Vasyl Vytvytsky. The manuscript of the sonata was obtained from the Bibliothèque nationale de France (code D 11688), and published in Kyiv by the Ukrainian composer Mykhailo Stepanenko. Its first performance, with Stepanenko accompanying the violinist Alexander Panov, took place on 26 May 1981 at the Kyiv Conservatory (now the Ukrainian National Tchaikovsky Academy of Music).

In the early 2000s, a manuscript entitled Sonata Per il Clavircembalo Del. Sig. Ber[esowsky] was found in the library of the Czartoryski Museum by the Ukrainian academic Valeriya Shulgina. The attribution to Berezovsky was confirmed by Shulgina and experts at the National Library of Poland, who analysed the handwriting and demonstrated that the sonatas were written out by one person. A comparison of the sonatas with Berezovsky's surviving autograph of the antiphon he wrote as an examination piece in 1771 shows that manuscript was written by a copyist. In 2014, the works were reattributed as being of Czech origin, when the composers were identified as being Kauchlitz Colizzi, Johann Baptist Wanhal, and probably the clarinettist Joseph Beer.

==== Symphony in C major ====
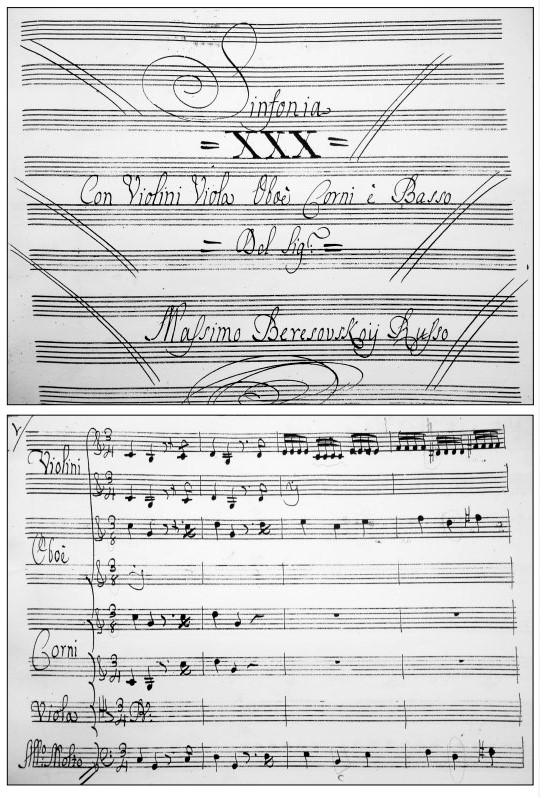
The first two pages of Berezovsky's symphony in C major

The article "Symphony: 18th century" of the 1980 edition of the New Grove Dictionary of Music and Musicians noted that "many Italian overtures have found their way into Russian libraries; and Berezovsky's Russian symphony/overture has been preserved in the Doria Pamphilj collection in Rome." It is the earliest symphony known to be written by a Russian composer.

In 1996, an article in Muzyka was the first to report the existence of a symphony by Berezovsky. The work, in C major, and named on the first page as Symphonia XXX, was discovered by the American conductor Steven Fox in 2002. Fox found a manuscript of the score in the music collection of an Italian aristocratic family, and was given permission for the work to be performed. The manuscript of the work is held in the Archivio Doria Pamphilj, in Rome. It is hand-bound within the penultimate volume—"XXX"—along with five symphonies by other composers. Berezovsky's symphony was not written out in parts, as most symphonies in the 18th century were published, but rather in the form of a full score.

Shumilina has suggested the possibility that the symphony was an overture to Berezovsky's opera and not a separate orchestral work. It was first performed by the early music orchestra Pratum Integrum in 2003, at the Royal Academy of Music in London. It was first played in Ukraine in 2016.

==== Symphonies by "Beresciollo" ====
External videos
- YouTube video
- UA-TV's world premiere of two symphonies by Berezovsky, followed by a performance of his Symphony No. 1 (Ukrainian National Chamber Ensemble, conductor Kirill Karabits).

Two symphonies that are likely to have been composed by Berezovsky—in C major and G major (named on the scores as XIII and XI respectively)—have since been found in Paris. The works were composed by an otherwise unknown man named Beresciollo. Published in 1760 in Paris, copies are now known to exist found in a number of European libraries. (Note: Beresciollo's two symphonies were preserved in the Bibliothèque nationale de France; the Universitätsbibliothek, Musiksammlung, Basel; the archives of the city of Agen, France; Musik- och teaterbiblioteket, Stockholm); Bibliothèque municipale, Bordeaux; and the Danish Royal Library in Copenhagen.) Certain themes in Beresciollo's Symphony in G major have an affinity with Ukrainian folk music. They were performed for the first time in 2020 by the Ukrainian National Chamber Ensemble, conducted by Karabits.

It was announced that the works were composed by Berezovsky in Kyiv in 1995, during the celebrations of the composer's 250th birthday. Berezovsky was a foreigner in Italy, and so was titled as Signor. His surname may have been written differently because of errors in transcribing the handwritten transcription of his name from the Russian, which would not have been easy for the West Europeans to read.

== Legacy ==
A monument to Berezovsky was installed in Hlukhiv, and his name is engraved in gold on a slab on the wall of the Accademia Filarmonica di Bologna, besides the name of Mozart. Andrei Tarkovsky's 1983 film Nostalghia is inspired by the life of Berezovsky. The 275th anniversary of Berezovsky's birth was celebrated in 2020.

Kirill Karabits, who conducted the Ukrainian premiere of Berezovsky's Symphony No.1, has said that both Russia and Ukraine have equal claim to the composer's legacy, saying that "Russians have the right to call Berezovsky 'Russian' and [Ukrainians] have a right to call him 'Ukrainian.'"

=== Recovered scores ===
After his death, Berezovsky's music was largely forgotten, until the middle of the 19th century, when it was once again performed. The interest this created led to more research on the composer being undertaken. Analysis of his music ceased during the Russian Revolution, when more of his music was lost. Since the 1950s, previously lost works by Berezovsky have been discovered, performed again, and recorded for the first time, and his music has since been actively promoted.

In 1998, the musicologist Christoph Wolff found six volumes of manuscripts containing 28 anonymous choral works composed by Berezovsky or Galuppi. Included are nearly all of Berezovsky's concerts published and known at the time, his liturgy, a communion hymn, and works that were previously considered lost. The documents, originally from the Library of the Sing-Akademie zu Berlin, had been taken to Kyiv by the Red Army after World War II, the most important finds (about a fifth) going to Moscow. The manuscripts, which had been stored and catalogued at the Kyiv Conservatory by the Soviets, were gifted to Germany by the Ukrainian government. In exchange, Germany gave manuscripts of Ukrainian composers to Ukraine. Among these were works by Berezovsky.

== Sources ==
- Azeev, Evstafiy Stepanovich (1914). На Литургии [At the Liturgy] (in Russian). Russian State Library.
- Ivchenko, Larisa (2021). Три симфонії [Maxim Berezovsky: Three Symphonies] (PDF). Kyiv: Muzychna Ukraina.
- Jaffé, Daniel (2012). Historical Dictionary of Russian Music. Scarecrow Press. ISBN 978-08108-7-980-5.
- Karabits, Kirill, ed. (2021). Три симфонії [Maxim Berezovsky: Three Symphonies] (PDF) (in Ukrainian). Kyiv: Muzychna Ukraina.
- Korniy, Lydia Pylypyvna (1998). Історія української музики [History of Ukrainian Music] (in Ukrainian). Vol. 1. Kharkiv; New York: P. Kotz. OCLC 978701286.
- Kuzma, Marika (2001). "Berezovs′ky, Maksym Sozontovych". Grove Music Online (8th ed.). Oxford University Press. ISBN 978-1-56159-263-0. (subscription, Wikilibrary access, or UK public library membership required)
- Lebedeva-Emelina, Antonina (2017). "Лебедева-Емелина А. В. Биографика композиторов екатерининской эпохи: соотношение документов, легенд и мифов" [Biographic Writings on the Composers of the Era of Catherine the Great: Correlation Between Documents, Legends, And Myths] (PDF). IMTI (17): 36–38.
- Rakochi, V. (2018). "Рукописи Не Горять, або Симфонія До-Мажор Максима Березовського" [Manuscripts do not burn, or Maxim Berezovsky's Symphony in C major] (PDF). Art Studies Studios (in Ukrainian). 1. National Academy of Sciences of Ukraine: 45–54. ISSN 1728-6875.
- Ritzarev, Marina (1983). Композитор М.С. Березовский: жизнь и творчество [Composer M.S. Berezovsky: Life and Work] (in Russian). Leningrad: Muzyka. OCLC 15856456.
- Ritzarev, Marina (2006). Eighteenth-Century Russian Music. Taylor & Francis. ISBN 978-13515-6-860-9.
- Shulgina, V.D. (2020). "Unique Manuscripts and Printed Documents of Ukrainian Musical Culture of the 18th Century". Cultural and Arts Studies of National Academy of Culture and Arts Management. Kyiv: Russian State Library.
- Shumilina, Olga (2015). "Композитор максим березовський: огляд прижиттєвих документальних матеріялів (до 270-річчя від дня народження)" [Composer Maxim Berezovsky: a review of documentary materials during his lifetime (for the 270th anniversary of his birth)] (PDF). українська музика [Ukrainian Music]. 18: 77–84.
- Shumilina, Olga (2018). "Реконструкція Біографічного Сценарію Життєтворчості М. Березовського У Світлі Основних Положень Концепції Вікового Музикознавства Н. Савицької" [Reconstruction of the biographical scenario of the life of M. Berezovsky in the light of the main provisions of the concept of age musicology] (PDF). українська музика [Ukrainian Music]. 29 (3): 21–28.
- Shumilina, Olga (2019). "Італійські Періоди Життєтворчості Максима Березовського Та Їх Роль У Становленні Індивідуального Музичного Стилю" [The Italian periods of Maxim Berezovsky's creative life and their role in the formation of individual musical style]. Scientific Herald (in Ukrainian) (126). Tchaikovsky National Music Academy of Ukraine: 93–101. doi:10.31318/2522-4190.2019.126.197976. ISSN 2522-4204.
- Shumilina, Olga Anatolyivna (2020). "Сонатна Форма Вінструментальних Творах Максима Березовського" [Sonata form in the instrumental works of Maxim Berezovsky]. Journal of the National Music Academy of Ukraine Named After P. I. Tchaikovsky (in Ukrainian). 46 (1): 6–16. doi:10.31318/2414-052x.1(46).2020.198489. ISSN 2414-052X.
- Shumilina, Olga (2021). "Клавірні Сонати Синьйора Бера З Краківського Рукопису І Чеська Музична Культура Другої Половини Хvііі Століття" [Signor Ber's Piano Sonatas From the Krakow Manuscript and Czech Musical Culture of the Second Half of the 18th Century]. українська музика [Ukrainian Music] (in Ukrainian). 41 (3): 24–32. doi:10.32782/2224-0926-2021-3-2.
- Stites, Richard (2008). Serfdom, Society, and the Arts in Imperial Russia: The Pleasure and the Power. Yale University Press. ISBN 978-03001-2-818-5.
- Suprun-Yaremko, Nadia (2014). Поліфонія: Посібник для студ.вищих навч.муз.заклад [Polyphony: A Guide for Students of Higher Educational Institutions of music]. Vinnytsia, Ukraine: Nova Knyha. ISBN 978-96638-2-510-6.
- Yurchenko, Mstyslav (2001). Text of booklet to the CD Sacred Music by Maksym Berezovsky
- Yurchenko, Mstyslav, ed. (2018). Newly Discovered Choral Concerti Part A – Concerti for Four Voices (PDF). Anthology of Ukrainian Sacred Music: Works by Ukrainian Composers. Vol. 5: Maksym Merezovsky. Kyiv: Komora Publishing House. ISBN 978-617-7286-40-9.
