= Cecilia Maria Barthélemon =

English singer, composer, pianist and organist

Cecilia Maria Barthélemon (1 September 1767 – 5 December 1859) was an English singer, composer, pianist, and organist. She published sonatas and other compositions and sang professionally in musicals.

== Early life ==
Cecilia Maria Barthélemon was born in 1767. Her mother, Maria Barthélemon, was a singer and composer, and her father, François-Hippolyte Barthélemon, was a violinist and a singer. From a young age, Barthélemon learned to sing and play the harpsichord, piano, organ, and harp from her parents. Until 1788, she studied harpsichord, piano, and organ with Johann Samuel Schröter.

in 1771–1772, while Barthélemon was an infant, her parents brought her on tour to Dublin. In 1776, the family toured Germany, France, and Italy, where Barthélemon sang for the King of Naples and the Queen of France.

== Professional life ==
Barthélemon debuted in London as a singer on 3 March 1779 at the Haymarket Theatre, where she sang an Italian duet with her mother. Her next large-scale performance was in April 1782, when she played the part of First Fairy in the musical "The Arcadian Pastoral." Her father led the orchestra and her mother directed the off-stage chorus.

At a benefit concert for her father in April 1784, Barthélemon played a piano concerto after Act I of Thomas Arne's opera Eliza. Her father accompanied her on the viola d’amore. After Act II, Barthélemon and her mother sang an Italian duetto..

Barthélemon's music was published from 1786 to 1795. Her debut as a composer was a volume of Three Sonatas for the Piano-Forte, or Harpsichord, the Second with an Accompaniment for Violin. Four more sonatas followed.

When Joseph Haydn came to England in the 1790s, the Barthélemon family became friends with him. He gave Barthélemon copies of his music. She dedicated some of her compositions to him.

Barthélemon died on 5 December 1859.

== Personal life ==
Barthélemon was married twice. She inscribed her name into her copies of Haydn's music with two different names. On one copy, she had the name Cecilia Maria Hinchcliffe.

A second copy had the name Cecilia Maria Henslow. Barthélemon married Captain E.P. Henslow around December 1796. She stopped performing publicly at this time.

== Compositions ==
- Op. 1: Three Sonatas for the Piano-Forte, or Harpsichord, the Second with an Accompaniment for the Violin, 1786. This volume was dedicated to Princess Sophia Matilda of Gloucester. A new edition of Sonata no. 2 appears in Cecilia Maria Barthelemon: Accompanied Keyboard Sonatas, ed. Calvert Johnson (Fayetteville: ClarNan Editions, 1994). A recording of Sonata no. 3 appeared on “Music for solo harpsichord by 18th century women composers”, Kingdom (UK) 2010.
- Op. 2: Two Sonatas for the Piano-Forte, 1792. This set of pieces was dedicated to Her Royal Highness the Duchess of York. A new edition of these pieces appeared in Accompanied Keyboard Sonatas, ed. Johnson.
- Op. 3: Sonata for the Piano-Forte or Harpsichord, 1794. This piece was dedicated to J. Haydn M.D. A new edition was edited by Sally Fortino, 1995. It was recorded for the 1990 CD, “18th Century Solo Harpsichord Music by Women Composers, vol. II”.
- Op. 4: Sonata for the Piano-Forte or Harpsichord, with an Accompaniment for a Violin, 1795. This piece was dedicated to Her Majesty The Queen of Naples. Modern edition is in Accompanied Keyboard Sonatas, ed. Johnson.
- The Capture of the Cape of Good Hope, for the piano-forte or harpsichord. This piece was dedicated to Sir George Keith Elphinstone, KB. The piece is included in Women Composers: Music Through the Ages (G.K. Hall, 1995– ), vol. 5.
