= José Mariano Elízaga =

Mexican composer and pianist

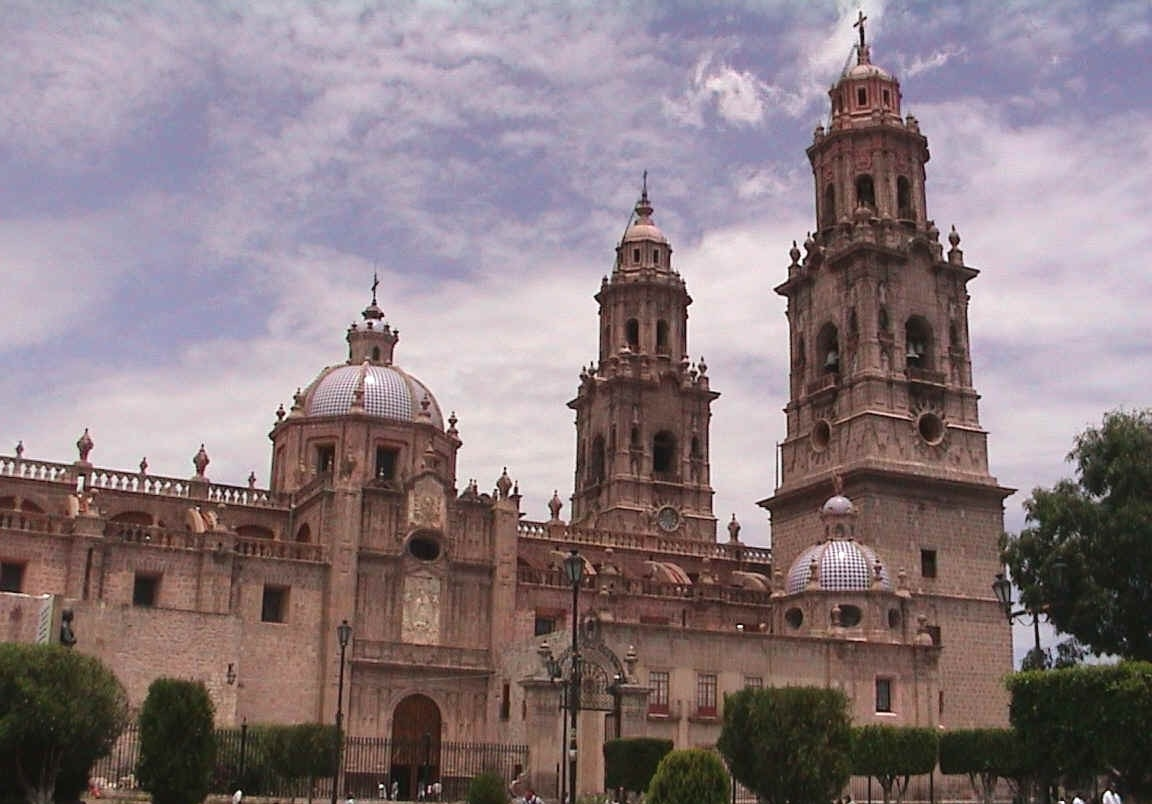
Elízaga Prado, José Damián

Elízaga Prado, José Damián (27 September 1786 – 2 October 1842) was a Mexican composer, music theorist, pianist, organist and teacher. He was the Kapellmeister of emperor Agustín I of Mexico and was the first great Mexican composer of the beginning of the 19th century.

== Life ==
Elízaga was born in Valladolid (Morelia), and was a child prodigy. He played before the viceroy Juan Vicente de Güemes, 2nd Count of Revillagigedo when he was 6. The viceroy became his main protector and sent him to the Colegio de Infantes de la Catedral. Elízaga later returned to Valladolid and in 1799 to Morelia where he worked as an organist. He acquired the best pianoforte of Mexico City to teach the local aristocracy. One of his pupils was Ana María de Huarte y Muñiz who later became the wife of Agustín de Iturbide, the emperor of the First Mexican Empire. In 1822, Elízaga was appointed ¨maestro de capilla¨ (Kapellmeister) of the Capilla Imperial. In 1823 he published his Elementos de música in Mexico City, a copy can be found in the Biblioteca Nacional in Mexico. The end of the First Mexican Empire damaged Elizaga's reputation but the Mexican government continued to support him. Elizaga settled the bases for the musical life of Mexico in the 19th century. He promoted the first Philharmonic Society of Mexico. In 1825 he founded the Philharmonic Academy which became the first conservatory of the Americas. In 1826 he founded the first music press in Mexico where he published his works and of other Mexican composers. Elízaga was soon considered the best Mexican composer of his time. In 1835 he published his treatise Principios de la armonía y de la melodía (Principles of harmony and melody) which was a great contribution to the Mexican music theory in the 19th century. He retired to Morelia in 1842 where he died at 56.

Until today very few scores of Elízaga have survived, since 1994 many of his scores have been found like the Ultimas Variaciones (Last variations) for keyboard which show a strong influence of Joseph Haydn.

== Works ==
Church music: Dúo de las siete palabras, Lamentaciones, Maitines de la transfiguración, Misas, Miserere, Oficios.

Secular music: El 16 de Septiembre. Inclito gran Morelos, Seis valses, Vals con variaciones a la memoria de Rossini, Ultimas variaciones.

== Sources ==
- Diccionario de la música española e hispanoamericana tomo 4
- The New Grove Dictionary of music and musicians. Second edition. 8
- Enciclopedia de México. 5
