= Carl Eberwein =

German composer and violinist

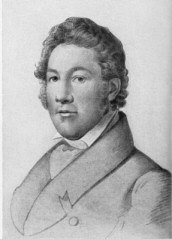
Carl Eberwein.

Franz Carl Adalbert Eberwein (10 November 1786 - 2 March 1868) was a German composer and violinist. He was born in Weimar, Holy Roman Empire and learned music under the consultation of his father. He was good friends with Johann Wolfgang von Goethe, and put music to many of his works, such as Faust and to Proserpina. There is also at least one flute concerto, a quatuor brillant (string quartet with leading violin; opus 4, after 1805?) in A major, song cycles and cantatas (some but not all to words by Goethe; also a Trauercantate to words by Friedrich Wilhelm Riemer, Eberwein's opus 21 published in 1830.)
