= Jean-Louis Tulou =

French flute teacher and player, composer, and instrument maker

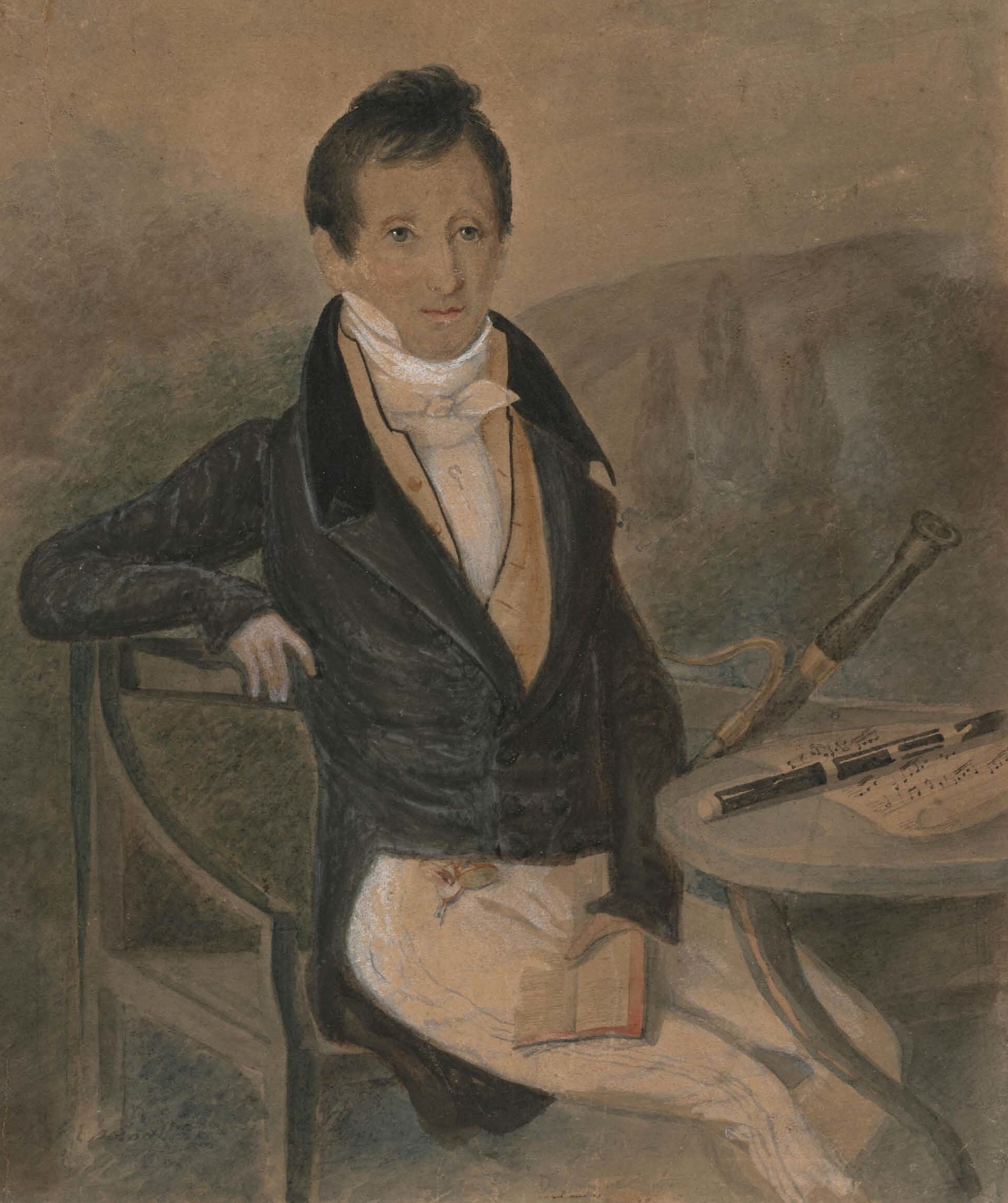

Jean-Louis Tulou (born 12 September 1786 in Paris – died 23 July 1865 in Nantes) was a French flute teacher and performer, composer, and instrument maker.

== Family and life ==
His father, Louis-Prosper Tulou (1749–1799), was a bassoonist in the Paris Opera and professor at the Paris Conservatoire from 1795 until his death.

Jean-Louis studied at the Paris Conservatoire from the age of 10. He became a professor there in 1829 and remained until 1856. He was involved in flute manufacture. He died on 23 July 1865 in Nantes.

== List of compositions ==
=== Flute method ===
- "Méthode de Flûte", published 1835 (Paris) includes flute duets etc.

=== Piccolo method ===
- Metodo Populare (Popular Method)

=== Flute and piano ===
Note: arrangements may exist for quartet/orchestra as well as with piano.

- Air Varie, Op. 22
- Air Ecossais - Fantaisie Brillante Op.29
- Fantasie, Op. 30
- Air Varie, Op. 35
- Fantasie, Op. 36
- L'Angelus Fantaisie, Op. 46
- Welsh Air and Variations on "All Through The Night" Op. 48
- Air Varie, Op. 62
- Grand Solo No. 1
- Grand Solo No. 2 Op. 70
- Air Varie, Op. 73
- Grand Solo No. 3 Op. 74
- Grand Solo No. 4 Op. 77
- Grand Solo No. 5 Op. 79
- Grand Solo No. 6 Op. 82
- Grand Solo No. 7 Op. 86
- Grand Solo No. 8
- Grand Solo No. 9
- Grand Solo No. 10 Op. 92
- Grand Solo No. 11 Op. 93
- Grand Solo No. 12 Op. 94
- Grand Solo No. 13 Op. 96
- Grand Solo No. 14 Op. 97
- Grand Solo No. 15
- Grand Duo Brilliant - La Donna Del Lago, Op. 154
- 3 Italian Arias

=== Flute d'Amour and piano ===
- Fantasy on a theme of Caraffa

=== Flute(s) and guitar ===
- Six Airs Italiens. Transcription by Jean-Louis Tulou and Ferdinando Carulli

=== Two flutes ===
- 3 Duos Facile (3 Easy Duets), Op. 1
- 3 Duos Concertante, Op. 2
- 3 Sonates Pour deux Flutes, Op. 8
- 3 Duos Faciles (3 Easy Duets), Op. 11
- 3 Duos Dificiles, Op. 12
- 3 Duos, Op. 14 (D, e, A)
- 3 Duos Dificiles, Op. 15
- 3 Duos, Op. 18
- 3 Grand Duos Concertante, Op. 19 (G, Eb, g)
- 3 Grand Duos, Op. 31
- 3 Duos, Op. 33 (G, D, A)
- 3 Duos Concertante Op. 34 (C, D, G)
- 3 Grand Duos, Op. 72 (D, C, D)
- Theme Varie, Op. 89
- 3 Duos Faciles (3 Easy Duets), Op. 102
- 3 Duos Faciles (3 Easy Duets), Op. 103
- 3 Duos, Op. 104

=== Three flutes ===
- Grand Trio Op. 24 in E♭ Major
- Trio Op. 26
- Recollections Of Ireland, Op. 50
- Souvenir Anglais Op. 51
- Trio - "Les trios amis", Op. 65 in F Major
- Trio Op. 83 in A Major

=== Five flute concertos ===
- Concerto No. 1
- Concerto No. 2
- Concerto No. 3 Op. 10 in D Major
- Concerto No. 4
- Concerto No. 5 Op. 37

== Sources ==
- Great Flute Makers of France, Tula Gianini (Tony Bingham, London, 1993).
- My Complete Story of the Flute, Leonardo De Lorenzo ISBN 0-89672-277-5
- Flute repertoire catalogue: 10,000 titles. Frans Vester. London: Musica Rara, 1967
