= Johann Gottlieb Preller =

Johann Gottlieb Preller, or Breller, (9 March 1727 – 21 March 1786), was a German cantor, composer, and land surveyor.

== Early life and education ==
He was born in Oberroßla, (now part of Apolda, Thuringia). Nothing is known of his musical training. He may have been a pupil of Johann Nicolaus Mempel in Apolda, which is inferred from the common authorship of the Mempell-Preller-Handschrift, a manuscript collection of organ and keyboard works by Johann Sebastian Bach. He studied from 1750 at the University of Jena and in 1753 or 1754 was appointed cantor in Dortmund, where he founded a collegium musicum. He remained there for the rest of his life. His only known composition is a Laudate Dominum.
