= Franz Asplmayr =

Austrian composer and violinist

Franz Asplmayr (1 April 1728 – 29 July 1786) was an Austrian composer and violinist. There are many variants of his name, including Franz Aspelmayr, Franz Aschpellmayr and Franz Appelmeyer. He is best known for an opera on Greek myths and for a few symphonies and string trios which were once attributed to Joseph Haydn. Among the few scholars who have studied his music, there are differing opinions as to the quality. J. Murray Barbour says of Asplmayr's 80 minuets "scored mostly for oboes, horns, and strings, without violas" that "all are extremely boring, as if written between beers". Temperly, on the other hand, finds advances "with respect to harmony and developmental techniques".

Asplmayr was born in Linz. His father taught him violin and, by the 1750s, he had steady employment playing violin in Vienna. In 1761, he took over Christoph Willibald Gluck's duty of writing ballet music for the German troupe. Although he was paid to write symphonies, few of those scores have survived.
