= Demophon (seer) =

Demophon was a seer in Alexander's entourage. The King ignored Demophon's prediction of danger before the attack on the Mallian town in India in 325 BC. Demophon was one of several men who slept in the alleged temple of Serapis at the time of Alexander's fatal illness.
