= Demofonte (Berezovsky) =

Opera seria composed by Maksym Berezovsky

Il Demofonte
- Opera seria by Maksym Berezovsky
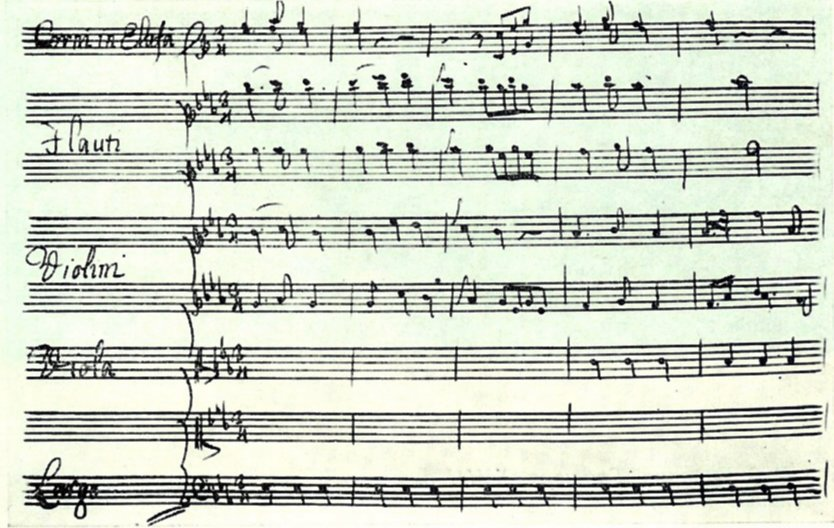
- Aria of Timante, "Misero pargoletto", the fragment of the composer's manuscript
- Native title: Russian/Ukrainian: Демофонт or Демофон
- Librettist: Pietro Metastasio
- Language: Italian
- Based on: Il Demofonte
- Premiere: February 1774; Livorno

Il Demofonte, also: Demofonte, Demofoonte or Demofont (Russian and Ukrainian: Демофонт or Демофон) is an opera seria by the Ukrainian composer Maksym Berezovsky (1745–1777) composed in 1773 to an Italian libretto by Pietro Metastasio.

The opera libretto Il Demofonte was written by Metastasio in 1731 (or 1733) and became immensely popular. By 1800 it had inspired at least 73 operas (according to the Encyclopaedia Musical St. Petersburg: The 18th Century)

The version by Maksym Berezovsky is especially important for music history as the first opera by a Russian as well as a Ukrainian composer.

== Creation and performance history ==
Berezovsky worked on the opera during his 4-year stay in Italy. It was for a winter carnival in Livorno, where a Russian flotilla was anchored, written at the request of his patron, count Alexei Grigoryevich Orlov, the commander-in-chief of the Russian fleet. The opera was premiered in February 1773 and was well received by the local press.

The review in the Livorno newspaper Notizie del mondo published on February 27, 1773 noted that the “opera with music composed by Maestro Beresovsky, the Russian maestro di cappella at the service of Her Majesty the Empress of the whole Russia, combines liveliness and good taste with the possession of musical science”.

The full score of the opera has been lost and is preserved only in a few remaining fragments: sinfonia (that regarded as the first Symphony of a Russian/Ukrainian composer), which probably served as an introduction to the opera, and four arias:

- Sinfonia in C major (1770–1773) in three short movements listen to the beginning of Sinfonia
- Aria of Demofonte “Per lei fra l’armi”
- Aria of Demofonte “Mentre il cor con meste voci”
- Aria of Timante "Prudente mi chiedi" from Act II listen to the introduction to the Aria
- Aria of Timante "Misero pargoletto" from Act III, Scene 5

It is known via Sergei Prokofiev that Sergei Diaghilev had an intention to re-stage the opera; however, this plan had not been realized. The arias were published in Kiev in 1988. The recording of the Sinfonia and two Timante’s Arias now are available on a CD (Maxim Berezovsky: Secular Music, SACD CM 0022003, 54:48)

== Roles ==
- Demofonte
- Dircea
- Creusa
- Timante
- Cherinto
- Matusio

A playbill featuring the singers' names was found by Robert-Aloys Mooser and published in Annales de la Musique et des Musiciens en Russie au XVIIIe siècle (Geneva, 1948). It reads:

Demofonte, dramma seria. Musica del Sig. Maestro Berezowskoy.

- Attori
- Signori:
  - Giacomo Verdi
  - Francesco Porri
  - Giuseppe Afferri (tenore)
  - Vincenzo Nicolini
- Signore:
  - Camilla Mattei
  - Caterina Spighi

Le balli sono inventati e diretti delli Signori Fratelli Turchi

== Synopsis ==
The Thracian king Demofonte asks the oracle of Apollo how long the practice of the annual sacrifice of a virgin will continue. The answer is puzzling: "as long as the innocent usurper sits on the throne". The nobleman Matusio tries to protect his daughter Dircea from being sacrificed. He and Demofonte are unaware that Dircea is secretly married to Timante, the son of Demofonte and the heir to the throne. Demofonte wants Timante to merry Creusa, a princess of Phrygia. Timante's younger brother Cherinto is accompanying her to the kingdom of Thrace, however he falls in love with her. Meeting Creusa, Timante admits that he can't marry her, but does not explain why.

Dircea has been caught while trying to flee the country and imprisoned, and Demofonte orders the immediate sacrifice of Dircea. Timante tries to release her but with no success. He is also imprisoned. Creusa asks Demofonte for mercy. The king releases Timante and Dircea, and Timante decides to give up the throne in favour of Cherinto.

Suddenly they find a letter revealing that Dircea is the daughter of Demofonte, which makes Timante and Dircea brother and sister. Timante is in despair, and tries to avoid Dircea. However another letter reveals that Timante is the son of Matusio. Everybody is happy. The marriage of Timante and Dircea becomes legal, and Cherinto is the real crown prince and can marry Creusa. No more virgins are sacrificed, since Timante is no longer the "innocent usurper of the throne".

== Bibliography ==
- Энциклопедический словарь Брокгауза и Ефрона (1890—1907)
- Штелин, Я. Музыка и балет в России XVIII века. // Музыкальное наследство. Вып. 1. М., 1935
- Старикова, Л. М. Новые документы о деятельности итальянской труппы в России в 30-е годы XVIII века <...> // ПКНО. 1988. М., 1989
- Рыцарева, Марина Композитор Березовский, - Rytsareva, Marina Kompozitor Berezovsky, Leningrad, Muzyka, 1983
