= Grand Kabuki =

Japanese theatre troupe

Grand Kabuki is a theatre troupe originating in Japan.

Using a stylized mixture of dance and music, mime and vocal performance, Grand Kabuki is a form of moralizing entertainment in Japan since the mid-17th century. Kabuki was considered the theatre of the common people.

Grand Kabuki made its United States debut at Manhattan's City Center in 1960. This troupe is one of Japan's oldest and greatest theater troupes. Unlike previous Kabuki-type visitors to America, Grand Kabuki, as true Kabuki, consists of all-male casts. Though Kabuki actually originated around 1600 with a woman dancer, one of its great modern claims to distinction is its onnagata, or extraordinary female impersonators.
