= Elias Mann =

Music Composer

Elias Mann (May 8, 1750 in Weymouth, Massachusetts – May 12, 1825 in Northampton) was one of the first American composers. He was one of the men responsible for founding the Massachusetts Musical Society.

== Scores ==
Volume 4. Elias Mann (1750-1825), The Collected Works, edited by Daniel Jones. 192 pages, ISBN 0-8153-2398-0
