= Demofoonte (Gluck) =

Opera by Christoph Willibald Gluck

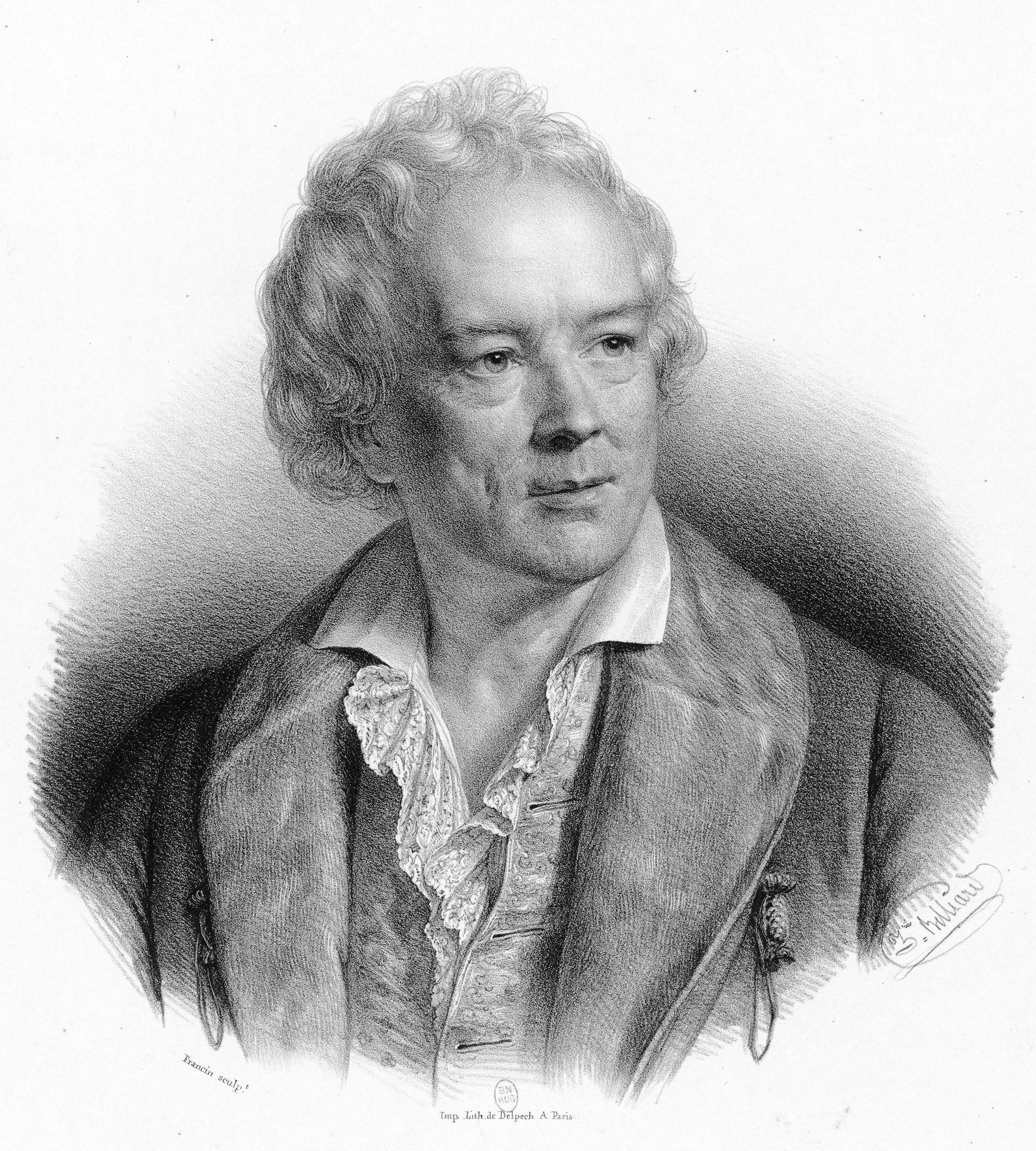
Christoph Willibald Gluck

Demofoonte is a dramma per musica or opera in 3 acts by composer Christoph Willibald Gluck. The work uses an Italian language libretto by Pietro Metastasio. The opera premiered on 6 January 1743 at the Teatro Regio Ducale in Milan.

== Roles ==
| Role | Voice type | Premiere Cast Conductor: |
|---|---|---|
| Demofoonte | castrato | |
| Dircea | soprano | |
| Adrasto | tenor | |
| Matusio | bass | |
| Creusa | soprano | |
| Cherinto | castrato | |
| Olinto | castrato | |
| Timante | castrato | Giovanni Carestini |

== Revivals ==
The first modern performance of the opera took place at the Theater an der Wien in Vienna, Austria on November 23, 2014. The opera was conducted by Alan Curtis (harpsichordist), featured his Il Complesso Barocco as well as Aryeh Nussbaum Cohen in the primo uomo role of Timante.
