= Cal Performances =

Performing arts organization at the University of California, Berkeley

Cal Performances is the performing arts presenting, commissioning, and producing organization based at the University of California, Berkeley in Berkeley, California.

The origins of Cal Performances date from 1906, when stage actress Sarah Bernhardt appeared at the William Randolph Hearst Greek Theatre to help rebuild public morale after the devastating San Francisco earthquake and fire in April of that year.

Cal Performances presents approximately 80 performances annually in five primary venues—Zellerbach Hall, Zellerbach Playhouse, Hertz Hall, and the Hearst Greek Theatre on the UC Berkeley campus, and First Church of Berkeley—and in site-specific locations and other spaces. The performances range among Modern and Classical Dance, Theater, Instrumental and Vocal Recital, Early Music, Opera, Chamber Music, Jazz, New Music, World Music, Dance & Theater, and a speaking series. Cal Performances serves some 150,000 patrons annually through performances and arts education, residency and community programs. The organization also operates a robust venue rental program in multiple spaces as a service to the University and other clients.

== Mission statement ==
Cal Performances at the University of California, Berkeley is a performing arts presenter, that hosts live performances featuring artists across a range of disciplines.

== History ==
Cal Performances is the performing arts presenting, commissioning and producing organization based at the University of California, Berkeley. The origins of Cal Performances date from 1906, when stage actress Sarah Bernhardt appeared at the William Randolph Hearst Greek Theater to help rebuild public morale after the devastating San Francisco earthquake and fire in April of that year.

Over the subsequent century, Cal Performances grew to become the largest, multi-discipline performing arts presenter in Northern California, and one of the largest university-based arts presenters in the United States.

=== Founding and Early Expansion ===
The San Francisco earthquake and fire of April 18, 1906 proved momentous to the rise of this arts institution in Berkeley. Sarah Bernhardt’s landmark performance in Racine’s Phèdre on May 17, 1906, was a testament to the restorative powers of the performing arts for the thousands of citizens who had been impacted by the earthquake, and the atmosphere of expectancy surrounding the appearance of “The Divine Sarah” was rewarded by her decision to donate the proceeds of her performance to the Emergency Relief Fund. Bernhardt’s wild popularity combined with the Greek Theatre’s spectacular design and atmosphere, set in motion the tradition of performing arts presentation in Berkeley. In the words of theater director Samuel Hume, it was the event that “placed the Greek Theatre definitely in the field of the commercial theatre.”

William Dallam Armes, Chair of the Musical and Dramatic Committee, realized that the Theatre’s large seating area (of about 6,500) made it economically feasible to invite big-name artists of national and international standing such as Bernhardt. Major stars of the time such as Margaret Anglin and Maude Adams brought notoriety to the campus through the Hearst Greek Theatre, in conjunction; the theatre also burnished their reputations as well.

Soon after the Greek Theatre opened, University faculty and administration realized the need for a smaller stage suited to productions requiring an intimate setting. In 1917, the campus gained a 1,050-seat (now reduced to 700) auditorium with the opening of Wheeler Hall, in the heart of the university campus. Wheeler Hall’s auditorium immediately became a vital performance venue overseen by the Musical and Dramatic Committee, where it was possible to increase the variety of chamber music and recital programs offered, as well as drama, lectures and other entertainments.

Though members of the Drama, Music and Dance departments realized that Wheeler Auditorium was not the ideal venue for the performing arts on all occasions, several uncompleted projects and, later, the financial strains of The Great Depression delayed the completion of a venue designed for such performances. The opening of Alfred Hertz Memorial Hall in 1958, with its formidable collection of organs and superior acoustics, was marked by the May T. Morrison Music Festival, a presentation of 11 programs between April 15 and May 22, 1958, presented by the Committee on Drama, Lectures and Music. Music critic Alfred Frankenstein claimed Hertz Hall to be the finest auditorium in California.

=== 1960s-present ===
Seeing that Wheeler Auditorium and Hertz Hall were not suited for presenting drama and dance, Zellerbach Hall was built in 1968. Zellerbach Hall consists of two main theaters: the 2,015-seat Auditorium (today known as Zellerbach Hall) and the 500-seat, multiform Playhouse. The Playhouse was conceived as a laboratory in which students can learn all aspects of the dramatic arts. Movable seating allows for numerous formations of the stage. The stage of the Auditorium is equipped for all major forms of theater, opera, music and dance productions, and, with the aid of a movable acoustic shell, the magnitude of the stage can be scaled back to suit chamber or recital music programs. Zellerbach has become Cal Performances’ main venue for presenting various genres of the performing arts as well as lecture events, and is one of the most well-appointed theaters in the United States.

== Artists Presented ==
Traditional and non-traditional artists regularly appear on or near the UC Berkeley campus in the theaters and concert halls managed by Cal Performances, including Mikhail Baryshnikov, Wynton Marsalis, Cecilia Bartoli, Bryn Terfel, Mark Morris, Yo-Yo Ma, Philip Glass, Alvin Ailey American Dance Theater, Merce Cunningham, Pina Bausch, Bill T. Jones, Peter Sellars, and Robert Lepage; as well as artists based in the San Francisco Bay Area like John Adams, Lou Harrison, Margaret Jenkins, Paul Dresher, Kronos Quartet, Joe Goode, Kaila Flexer, Jon Jang, and Sarah Cahill. Cal Performances is also instrumental in facilitating the touring of large ensembles from abroad, and has hosted such companies as the Grand Kabuki Theater of Japan, the Bolshoi and Kirov Ballet companies, Lyon Opera Ballet and Orchestra, the Kirov Orchestra, the Russian National Orchestra, the Berliner Ensemble, the Beijing People’s Art Theater, the Gate Theater of Dublin, Les Arts Florissants, Ballet Nacional de Cuba, and Nederland Dans Theater, among others.

== Current Leadership ==
Jeremy N. Geffen is the current Executive and Artistic Director of Cal Performances. Geffen came to Berkeley in April 2019 from Carnegie Hall, where he held the position of Senior Director and Artistic Adviser.

Geffen provides the overall artistic vision and executive leadership for Cal Performances. This encompasses initiating and commissioning new artistic and educational ventures, and supporting the educational and research mission of the university through the performing arts program.
