= La toison d'or (opera) =

Opera by Johann Christoph Vogel

La toison d'or (The Golden Fleece), soon revised as Médée à Colchos ou La toison d'or (Medea in Colchis or The Golden Fleece), is a French-language opera in three acts by the composer Johann Christoph Vogel. It was first performed at the Académie Royale de Musique (the Paris Opera) on 5 September 1786, "some years after its completion". The libretto, by Philippe Desriaux, is based on the legend of Jason and the Golden Fleece.

La toison d'or was the first of Vogel's two operas. The second, Démophon, premiered posthumously in 1789.

== Performance history ==
The opera premiered on 5 September 1786, though the first printed libretto indicates that it had been intended to open six days earlier, on 29 August 1786. According to Théodore Lajarte, "the opera rehearsals did not go without a hitch", as singer Adelaïde Gavaudan refused to assume the role of Medea's sister, Calciope. On the premiere day, a "lettre de cachet" for Gavaudan's arrest was issued and she was imprisoned until 22 September. She received temporary permits to leave prison only in connection with her commitments on stage.

La toison d'or was written a number of years before its premiere. Vogel emulated Gluck's operatic style, as he noted in his "touchingly sincere" dedication to that composer in the published score. Gluck, in return, congratulated Vogel on his score's "dramatic skill". By the time of the premiere, however, "taste had turned towards Sacchini" and Vogel's work, probably appearing somewhat old-fashioned and also lacking a ballet, did not meet with much success and was immediately reworked. A new libretto was published under the title Médée à Colchos ou La toison d'or and the revised version was mounted on 2 October 1786, a Sunday. In fact, this second libretto gives its initial presentation date as "Tuesday 27 September 1786", but as in the original libretto, the debut had to be postponed for several days, this time because Anne Chéron, who was cast as Hipsiphile, was suffering from a severe cold and was unable to perform. Adelaïde Gavaudan, who had been replaced as Calciope but remained Chéron's understudy, was requested to step in, but she claimed she had not fully mastered the role; director Dauvergne ultimately resolved to change the bill and rescheduled the performance for the following Sunday. Even with the revisions, and continuing additions of ballet pantomimes, the audience's appreciation of Vogel's opera did not increase and it was withdrawn on 7 November 1786 after nine performances in all, returning only 2,166 livres to the box office. It was revived at the Paris Opera beginning on 17 June 1788, but Vogel’s death on 26 June between the second and third performances ended the run prematurely; it earned only 1,553 livres 6 sols in the third and final performance of the revival on 1 July, and was shelved thereafter, having been presented a dozen times.

== Roles ==
Roles	Voice type	Premiere cast 5 September 1786	Revised version cast 2 October 1786
Médée (Medea)	soprano	Marie-Thérèse Davoux (called "Mlle Maillard")	Mlle Maillard
Jason	basse-taille (baritone)	François Lays	François Lays
Hipsiphile (Hypsipyle)	soprano	Anne Chéron (called "Mlle Dozon" at the premiere)	Anne Chéron
Calciope	soprano	Adélaïde Gavaudan, cadette (the younger)	Josèphe-Eulalie Audinot
Arcas	basse-taille (5 September) taille (baritenor) (2 October)	M. Moreau	M Martin
Un guerrier (a warrior)	basse-taille (?)		Pierre-Charles Le Roux cadet (the younger)
La Grande Sibile (the Great Sibyl)	soprano		Suzanne Joinville
Première Sibile (first Sibyl)	soprano		Mlle Buret
Seconde Sibile (second Sibyl)	soprano		Mlle St. James
Chorus: Women of Hypsipyle's retinue, Argonauts, people of Colchis, giants, sailors

== Synopsis ==
=== Act 1 ===
Scene: A plain outside the walls of Colchis.
Jason and the Argonauts have voyaged from Greece for Colchis in search of the Golden Fleece. Jason's wife, Queen Hypsipyle, has secretly followed him there. She arrives to hear a chorus celebrating Jason's triumph over fire-breathing bulls. They also congratulate Princess Medea of Colchis on her forthcoming marriage to Jason. The news shocks Hypsipyle. When Medea finds out that Jason is already married, she is furious and vows revenge on him. Jason and Hypsipyle are reconciled and decide to embark for Greece.

=== Act 2 ===
Scene: A dark forest by the sea, on which the Argonauts' fleet is sailing.
Medea's sister, Calciope, begs her to forget Jason, but Medea uses her magic to summon a storm which wrecks the Argonauts' ships. Jason and Hypsipyle make it to the shore and confront Medea. Jason urges her to forgive and forget, but Medea stabs Hypsipyle to death before his very eyes.

=== Act 3 ===
Scene: Walls surrounding the sacred forest in which the Golden Fleece is kept. Outside the walls, the Sybil's cave.
Still bent on revenge, Medea consults the Sybil in her cave. She plans to kill Jason but when she hears the Argonauts are in danger, she takes pity and rushes to his aid. Medea uses her magic powers to defeat the earth-born giants who are attacking the Argonauts. She also puts the dragon guarding the Golden Fleece to sleep, allowing Jason to steal it. Medea begs Jason to take her with him to Greece. When he refuses, she curses him and flies off in a chariot pulled by dragons.

== Recording ==
- La toison d'or: Marie Kalinine (Médée), Jean-Sébastien Bou (Jason), Judith Van Wanroij (Hipsiphile), Choir of the Staatstheater Nürnberg, Le Concert Spirituel, conducted by Hervé Niquet (2 CDs, Glossa, 2013)

== Sources ==
- Desriaux, Philippe. Second version libretto: (in French) Médée à Colchos ou la Toison d'or, Tragédie-lyrique en 3 actes, Représentée, pour la premiere fois, sur le Théatre de l'Académie Royale de Musique, le Mardi 27 Septembre 1786, Paris, de Lormel, 1786, via Gallica
- Dratwicki, Benoît, trans. Pardoe, Mary (2013): La Toison d'or, CD booklet notes to recording by Le Concert Spirituel directed by Hervé Niquet, pp. 13–17, Retrieved 29 July 2020.
- Jacobshagen, Arnold (2001). Vogel (Fogel), Johann Christoph. Grove Music Online. Retrieved 29 July 2020.
- (in French) Lajarte, Théodore, Bibliothèque Musicale du Théatre de l'Opéra. Catalogue Historique, Chronologique, Anecdotique, Paris, Librairie des bibliophiles, 1878, Tome I, Article CCXCIV: "La Toison d'or", p. 351 via Internet Archive
- (in French) Picot, Émile, Bibliographie Cornélienne, ou description raisonnée de toutes les éditions des oeuvres de Pierre Corneille, ..., Paris, Fontaine, 1876, pp. 431–432 via Google Books
- Pitou, Spire, The Paris Opéra. An Encyclopedia of Operas, Ballets, Composers, and Performers – Rococo and Romantic, 1715-1815, Westport/London, Greenwood Press, 1985, ISBN 0-313-24394-8
- Rushton, Julian (2002). Vogel (Fogel), Johann Christoph. Grove Music Online. Retrieved 29 July 2020.
- Vogel, Johann Christoph; Desriaux, Philippe. Original printed score: (in French) La Toison d'or, Tragédie lyrique en Trois Actes, Dédiée à Mr le Chevalier Gluck, Mise en Musique par Mr Vogel, Représentée pour la premiere fois, Par l'Accademie Royale de Musique, Le 5 Septembre 1786, Paris, Michaud, s.d. via Gallica
