= Démophon =

Opera composed by Johann Christoph Vogel

Démophon is a French-language opera by the composer Johann Christoph Vogel, first performed at the Académie Royale de Musique (the Paris Opera) on 15 September 1789. The libretto is by Philippe Desriaux. The second and last of Vogel's operas to be staged, it was premiered after the composer's death at the age of 32 the previous year.

== Roles ==
Cast	Voice type	Premiere
Démophon, King of Thrace	basse-taille (bass-baritone)	Martin-Joseph Adrien
Timante, son of Démophon, secretly married to Dircée	tenor	Étienne Lainez
Dircée	soprano	Marie-Wilhelmine de Roussellois
Narbal	tenor/baritone	François Lays
Adraste	basse-taille (bass-baritone)	Châteaufort
Un coryphée	basse-taille	Pierre-Charles Le Roux (the younger)
Le grand prêtre (the high priest)	basse-taille (bass-baritone)	Dufresne
Diane (the goddess Diana)	soprano	Burette
Une coryphée	soprano	Mullot (or Mulot)
Chorus: Priests, warriors and people of Thrace
