= Johann Vogel (composer) =

German composer (1756-1788)

- Born: Johann Christoph Vogel; 18 March 1756; Nuremberg, Germany
- Died: 28 June 1788 (aged 32); Paris, France

Johann Christoph Vogel (also given as Fogel) (18 March 1756, in Nuremberg – 28 June 1788, in Paris) was a German composer.

== Life ==
He spent most of his life working in France. He moved to Paris in 1776, and entered the service of the Duke of Montmorency and then of the Count of Valentinois as a horn player. He composed a great number of orchestral and chamber works but is best remembered for his oratorio Jephté, performed at the Concert Spirituel in September 1781, and for his two operas. Although his music was received favourably, his works never became extremely popular because they were deemed as 'too complicated and baroque'.

Vogel was an enthusiast for the operas of Gluck, and his first opera, La toison d'or, is dedicated to the composer as 'législateur de la musique'. In places it appears to be a faithful stylistic imitation of Gluck's two Iphigenia operas, Iphigénie en Tauride and Iphigenie auf Tauris , but with a fuller orchestration and a greater lyricism in the arias. The opera was written in 1781 but was not performed until 5 September 1786 at the Opéra National de Paris. It played for only 12 performances and was met with limited success since it seemed old-fashioned and contained no ballet. Philippe Desriaux, for many years the secretary of Baron von Tschudi, wrote the librettos for both La toison d'or and Vogel’s second opera, Démophon. Its posthumous première (at the Opéra on 22 September 1789) was given only after the première of Cherubini's opera on the same subject. Among the musical qualities of this work are the variety of recitative forms, the treatment of the woodwind as solo instruments and the harmonic colour of the choruses. The overture, composed in monothematic sonata form, remained popular into the early 19th century, and was incorporated into Pierre Gardel's ballet-pantomime Psyché (1790), which had more than 1000 performances at the Opéra National de Paris between its première and 1829.

== Sources ==
- Arnold Jacobshagen. The New Grove Dictionary of Opera, edited by Stanley Sadie (1992). ISBN 0-333-73432-7 and ISBN 1-56159-228-5
