= Seattle Flute Society =

Non-profit organization for flutists in Seattle, United States

- Location: Seattle

The Seattle Flute Society is a 501(c)(3) non-profit organization headquartered in Seattle, Washington. It was founded in 1979 to present recitals, master classes, and other flute events for Seattle area flutists.

== History ==
Members are amateur and professional flutists, teachers, students, flute makers, accompanists, listeners, patrons – anyone interested in the flute. Activities include meetings, ensemble performances, lectures, workshops, discussions, and solo performances by local and international flutists. The SFS sponsors a flute choir which is open to all adult members. Each year, the Flute Society holds a "Flute Festival" where instruments, music, accessories and other flute-related merchandise are exhibited, demonstrated and sold.

The SFS has sponsored performances and classes by flutists such as Claudia Anderson, Julius Baker, Jeanne Baxtresser, Leone Buyse, Tadeu Coelho, Michel Debost, Robert Dick, Zart Dombourian-Eby, Elena Duran, Jill Felber, Liz Goodwin, Jeffrey Khaner, Walfrid Kujala, Chris Norman, Amy Porter, Chris Potter, Paula Robison, Fenwick Smith, Alexa Still, Mimi Stillman, Gavin Tate-Lovery, Keith Underwood, Ransom Wilson, Trevor Wye, and more.

The SFS sponsors the Frank and Lu Horsfall Scholarship Competition each year for middle and high school students. The competition has two divisions: upper (high school) and lower (middle school), with the 1st-3rd place flutists receiving prizes.

SFS Presidents include Felix Skowronek, Scott Goff, Phyllis McDaniel, Rae Terpenning, Suzanne Walker, Paul Taub, Annie Carlson, Isabel Gallagher, Sarah Bassingthwaighte, Susan Telford, Celine Ferland, Shelley Collins, Jenny Eggert, and Sandra Saathoff.
