= Cheryl Boyd-Waddell =

American opera singer (1952–2002)

Cheryl Boyd-Waddell (born Margaret Cheryl Boyd, March 31, 1952 – April 27, 2002) was an American soprano, pianist, and voice teacher. Born in Pittsburgh, Pennsylvania, and raised in Long Beach, California, she was the sister of flutist Bonita Boyd with whom she often performed. She began her musical life as a classical pianist, making her concert debut at the age of 13 as a soloist with the California Chamber Symphony. She was active as a concert pianist in the Los Angeles area while a middle school and high school student; appearing in young artist concerts as a soloist with regional orchestras and in recitals. In high school she began performing in musicals in regional theaters in California, and was active as a musical theatre actress while a voice major at the University of Southern California (USC).

Cheryl graduated from USC in 1974, and studied at the Eastman School of Music where she earned two degrees: Master of Music and Doctorate of Music. She then joined the voice faculty of the University of Georgia and relocated to the Atlanta area where she lived out her life. There she worked as a concert soprano in oratorios and as a member of the chamber music group Thamyris. With this organization she performed contemporary classical compositions; including giving the world premieres of several works by American composers. At the time of her death in 2002 she was director of the voice department at Clayton State University where she was a professor of music.

== Early life and education in California ==
The daughter of Robert C. Boyd, Margaret Cheryl Boyd was born on March 31, 1952, in Pittsburgh, Pennsylvania. The Boyd family relocated to Long Beach, California, where they lived at a house on Heather Rd. There Cheryl attended school at Stanford Middle School and Millikan High School (MHS) in the Long Beach Unified School District. After graduating form Milliken she trained as a soprano at the University of Southern California (USC) where she graduated in 1974.

Cheryl began studying music seriously while very young; and was a piano student of Earl Voorhies at the California Institute of the Arts while a middle school and high school student. She made her professional concert debut as a pianist at the age of 13 as a soloist with the California Chamber Symphony (CCS) which was conducted by Henri Temianka. In 1966 she won the Southwestern Youth Music Festival competition, and in 1967 she won first prize in the CCS's Student Music Competition which led to another concert engagement with that orchestra.

In March 1967, at the age of 14, Cheryl performed in concert as a pianist with her older sister, the flutist Bonita Boyd, at American Jewish University. Bonita was by then already working as a concert flutist with American symphony orchestras. In April 1967 Cheryl was a soloist with the Long Beach Symphony Orchestra in a concert given at Los Angeles City College with conductor Hans Lampl. In November 1967 she gave a public recital at the Westide Jewish Community Center in Los Angeles in a program that included piano sonatas by Beethoven and Bartok, and Felix Mendelssohn's Preludes and Fugues, Op. 35.

In 1969 Boyd, while still a high school student, portrayed Eliza Doolittle in the musical My Fair Lady at the Downey Theatre in Downey, California in a production mounted by Downey Children's Theatre. In her college years at USC she continued to appear in local musical theatre productions. In 1970 she portrayed Julie Jordan in Rodgers and Hammerstein's Carousel with the Buena Park Civic Light Opera company. In 1971 she portrayed Lady Larkin in Once Upon a Mattress with the Westminster Community Theater. She returned to the Downey Theatre in 1971 as Laurie in the musical Oklahoma! with William Reynolds as Curly in a production staged by the Downey Theatre Guild.

== Graduate studies at Eastman ==
After graduating from USC, Boyd entered graduate voice program at the Eastman School of Music at the University of Rochester (UR) where she earned both a Master of Music and Doctorate of Music. She starred as Miss Wordsworth in the school's March 1975 production of Benjamin Britten's Albert Herring. The cast also included baritone William Sharp in the role of the vicar, and the production was directed by Leonard Treash. She performed in this same opera with the Chautauqua Opera in August 1975 with Ellen Faull as Lady Billows.

Boyd made her recital debut in Rochester in January 1976 in a program that included two arias from Handel's Giulio Cesare, Claude Debussy's Proses lyriques, and a work for soprano and flute by Adolphe Adam which she performed with her sister who was by that time principal flautist of the Rochester Philharmonic Orchestra. The sisters joined forces again later that year in a benefit recital given at UR to raise funds for the American Red Cross.

== Career ==
After completing her studies at Eastman, Boyd moved to Athens, Georgia, after accepting a position on the voice faculty of the University of Georgia. In 1977 she was a soloist in Carl Orff's Carmina Burana with the Athens Choral Society and the Union Civic Orchestra. In 1979 she won the Atlanta district division of the Metropolitan Opera National Council Auditions, and was a finalist in the Southeastern Division of the competition. In 1980 she performed a concert of opera arias with the Athens Symphony Orchestra. In 1981 she was a soloist at the Rochester Bach Festival performing Bach duets with her sister, and performed as a soloist in Handel's Messiah with a chorus of 300 voices in Atlanta. She gave a lecture recital at North Georgia College in 1982, and that same year performed at the Alhambra Dinner Theatre as Sister Margaretta in The Sound of Music with Paige O'Hara as Maria.

Boyd was active as soloist in professional chamber music concert series in Atlanta during the 1980s. In 1987 she performed Warren Benson's Five Lyrics Of Luise Bogan with her sister in a concert honoring Joseph Mariano at the convention of the National Flute Association in what critic James Wierzbicki of St. Louis Post-Dispatch described as the "most personable performance" heard at that event. In 1988 she became a member of the Atlanta based chamber music ensemble Thamyris; making her debut concert with the organization in April 1988 performing Lukas Foss's song cycle Thirteen Ways of Look at a Blackbird. She appeared with the ensemble at the Spoleto Festival USA and premiered over 30 new works with them, including Songs of Love and Longing by Stephen Paulus.

At the time of her death, she was voice professor and director of vocal activities at Clayton State University in Georgia.

== Recordings ==
Cheryl Boyd-Waddell appears as soprano soloist with the Thamyris ensemble on the following recordings:

- Alvin Singleton: Extension of a Dream. Label: Albany Records
- No Longer of That World – Music of Karl Boelter. Label: Aca Digital
- A City Called Heaven. Label: Aca Digital
