= Sinfonia Concertante for Four Winds =

1778 composition thought to be by Wolfgang Amadeus Mozart

- by W. A. Mozart (doubtful)
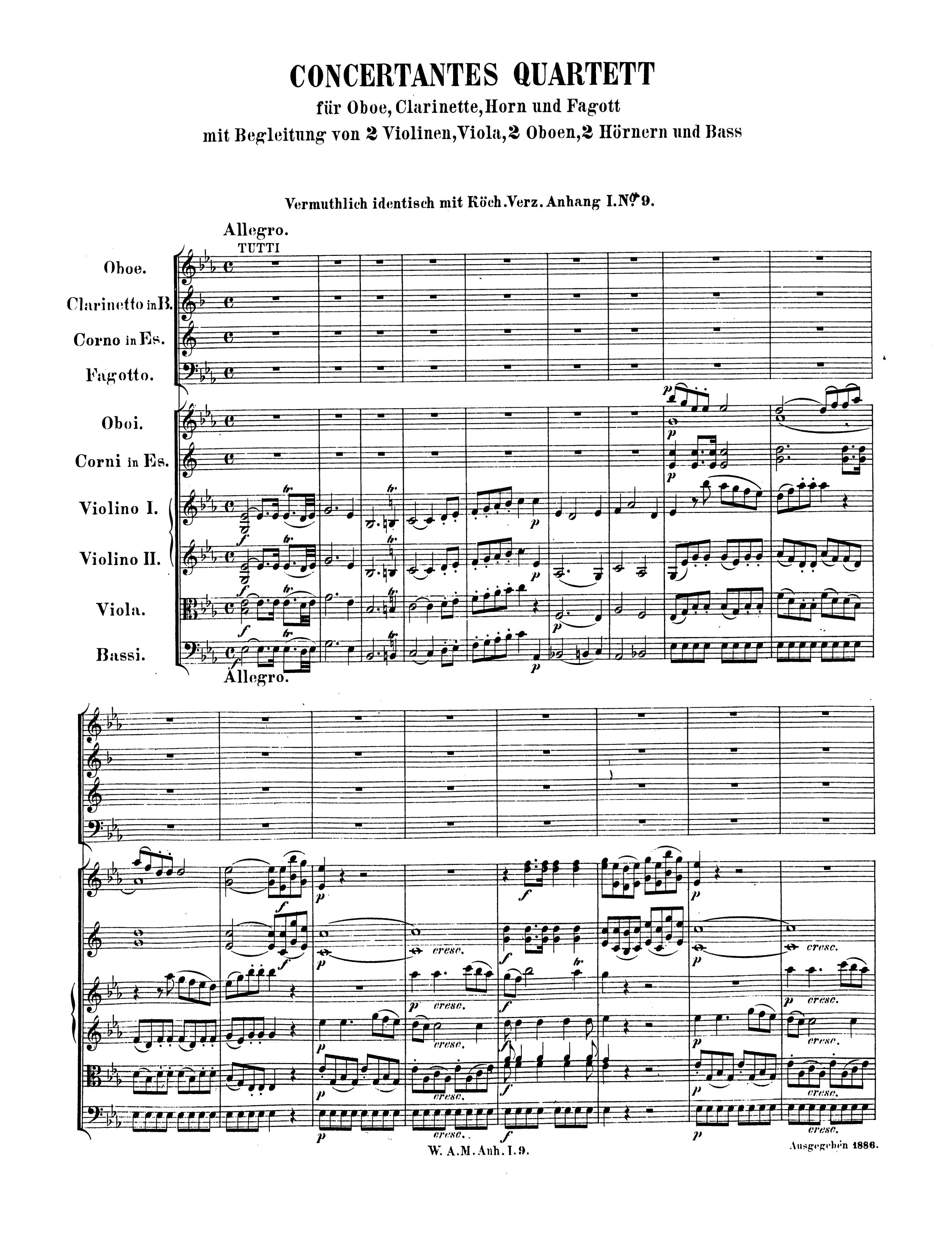
- Opening of the first movement (Breitkopf & Härtel)
- Key: E♭ major
- Catalogue: K. 297b/Anh. C 14.01
- Composed: Paris, April 1778 (now lost)
- Duration: c. 30 minutes
- Movements: 3
- Scoring: Solo oboe, solo clarinet, solo horn, solo bassoon, orchestra

The Sinfonia Concertante for Four Winds in E♭ major, K. 297b (Anh. C 14.01), is a work thought to be by Wolfgang Amadeus Mozart for oboe, clarinet, horn, bassoon, and orchestra. Mozart's work was written for flute, oboe, horn, bassoon, and orchestra, K. Anh. 9 (297B), in Paris in April 1778. This original work is lost, and it is not known who reworked it for a different combination of wind instruments if, indeed, this work is a reworking of Mozart's original.

== Lost manuscript ==
In April 1778, Mozart wrote to his father from Paris about the sinfonia concertante he was writing for performance at the Concert Spirituel naming the four virtuoso soloists who were to play. They were Johan Wendling (flute), Friedrich Ramm (oboe), Giovanni Punto (horn) and Georg Wenzl Ritter (bassoon). Mozart knew the three woodwind players from a previous visit to Mannheim. He wrote that the four soloists were "in love with" the work and that Joseph Legros, the Concert Spirituel director, had kept the score to have it copied. However at the last minute Mozart's piece was displaced from the concert program by a piece for similar forces by Giuseppe Cambini and the Mozart work was never played. From this point the original Mozart work became lost.

== As it is played today ==
The work as it is performed today came to light in 1869 as an anonymous copy manuscript in the collection of Otto Jahn. Jahn wrote the first scholarly biography of W. A. Mozart and had amassed a large quantity of Mozart letters, original manuscripts and score copies. These he made available to Köchel to assist with the creation of the Köchel catalogue of Mozart's work. There is considerable debate about the relation of this work as it is performed today to the lost original work, in part because the Jahn score has a somewhat different line-up of soloists from the lost Mozart work, but also because it contains errors both of copying and composition, as well as many dynamic markings and performance indications that Mozart would not have used, making it unlikely that it was copied from a Mozart manuscript. The manuscript bears no attribution to Mozart, or to any composer.

The work was endorsed as authentic by a number of Mozart scholars from the 1920s onward. These included Georges de Saint Foix and Alfred Einstein. Einstein was so convinced of its authenticity that he removed it from the appendix of the Köchel catalogue of Mozart's words to the main body, stating that although it had been arranged for a different group of soloists, "the arranger has not permitted himself any alteration seriously affecting the essential nature of the work". However, scholarly opinion had swung the other way by the 1960s when the work was removed from the main body of the revised Köchel catalogue and relegated once again to the appendix.

== Instrumentation ==
The sinfonia concertante is scored for solo oboe, solo clarinet, solo horn in E♭, solo bassoon, and an orchestra of two horns, two oboes, and strings. A typical performance lasts about 30 minutes.

== Movements ==
Sinfonia Concertante for Four Winds, K. 297b
I. Allegro

II. Adagio

III. Andantino con variazioni
Performed by James Caldwell (oboe), William McColl (clarinet), Robert Bonnevie (horn), and Arthur Grossman (bassoon), with the Casals Festival Orchestra, conducted by Alexander Schneider. Recorded at the Casals Festival by Voice of America in June 1964.

The work consists of three movements:

1. Allegro,
2. Adagio,
3. Andantino con variazioni, 2/4 then 6/8 from bar 262 onwards

The first movement is in sonata form with three expositions rather than two – one played by the orchestra, the other two by the soloists. It contains a written cadenza before the coda.

The second movement has "gentle exchanges of thematic material."

The third and final movement is composed of a theme with ten variations and a coda. Each variation is separated by "identical, basically decorative orchestral ritornelli". This movement is in 2/4 time until the end of the last variation, where 6 adagio bars in common time lead to a coda in 6/8 time.

== Authenticity ==
Mozart is known through letters and concert announcements to have written a sinfonia concertante for flute, oboe, horn, and bassoon, the original score of which is lost. There is considerable debate about the authenticity of what is performed today, and whether the extant piece is even related to the original work. Scholars have conflicting opinions about the work, but its authenticity is in enough doubt for the work to have been removed from the definitive catalogue of Mozart's works. There are a number of possibilities : the work is an arrangement of a work originally written by Mozart, it is a hybrid work based on Mozart's original solo parts, or it has no connection at all with Mozart. And there is the intriguing possibility that Mozart never actually wrote his sinfonia concertante in the first place. These options discussed in detail :

Initially the Sinfonia Concertante seems to have been accepted uncritically as a slightly different version of Mozart's lost work. However in the 1930s Donald Tovey described it as "blundering" and "inept". Alfred Einstein however considered it genuine. He considered the work to be an arrangement which retained the essential nature of the original and he identified a recurring Mozartean "motto" in the slow movement. Stanley Sadie was dismissive in particular noting that the solo clarinet cannot be directly back-transcribed to a supposed oboe part. Martin Staehelin considered that it was inconceivable that Mozart wrote a homotonal concerto (i.e. with all three movements in the same key; here E♭ major). No other attested Mozart concerto is homotonal though several of his symphonies and divertimenti are. Sadie thought that a sufficient reason for the homotonal character of the work might be to avoid a natural horn crook change and retune between movements. However, Richard Maunder points out that all of Mozart's authentic horn concerti use a different key for the slow movement if there is one, without requiring a crook change. Staehelin has written a book about the work which argues that it cannot be by Mozart. The Mozart Project considers this piece as "spurious or doubtful", and it does not appear on the project's listing of concertos.

Robert Levin analysed the Sinfonia Concertante and compared the structure of the work with known Mozart concertos. From this analysis he concluded that while the orchestral part and the first movement cadenza were spurious, the soloists' roles were based on the Mozart originals but had been modified by an unknown hand to substitute a clarinet for the oboe part and to change the flute for an oboe. This transcription process would have required the music for the three woodwind instruments to have been redistributed to accommodate the substitution of the clarinet for the original oboe part. Levin theorised that the unknown arranger had only the four original Mozart solo parts for reference so had composed the orchestral parts and cadenzas afresh. Levin wrote a book about the work and then went on to make a reconstruction of the supposed original Mozart work based on his research. For example, in the final movement he removed all the 10 short near-identical orchestral tuttis between the variations. Levin's reconstruction was recorded by the Academy of St Martin in the Fields with Neville Marriner conducting, and has also since been recorded by the Basel Chamber Orchestra.

Against Levin's theory, Richard Maunder pointed out that Levin's structural criteria fail to distinguish Mozart's works from those of other composers: Maunder uses two works by J. C. Bach as controls. He also points out that the writing for the instruments does not match the known capabilities of the players the Sinfonia Concertante was purportedly written for: for example, the bassoon line is restricted to G4, even though Ritter is known to have played up to B♭4, and the horn part shows idiomatic cor alto writing even though Punto was a cor basse player. Maunder suggests that it is more likely that the Sinfonia Concertante is a forgery of an eighteenth-century work, dating from 1820–1830; in support of this theory, he quotes Levin as noting that the clarinet part is written in a style unseen before the early 19th century, but that its upper range is unusually restricted. This suggests to Maunder the work of a forger, who was trying to avoid detection by limiting the instruments to what he imagined were their eighteenth-century ranges (but in fact were not). (Levin interprets this as indicating that the original Mozart work had been rearranged in 1820–1830, while Maunder suggests that there may not have been any Mozart original in the first place.)

Mozart displayed affection and prominence for the wind instruments in his operas and concertos. Noteworthy wind passages are in the fifteenth and seventeenth piano concertos, with memorable dialogues with the soloist; flute, oboe and bassoon. In opera there are many arias with similar woodwind and horn passages, such as Fiordiligi's "Per pietà, ben mio, perdona" from Così fan tutte. The aria Se il padre perdei from Idomeneo uses the same four wind instruments as the lost Paris work, is in E♭ and was written for the same Mannheim soloists. A passage from the Mozart Oboe Quartet first movement (bars 85–87 and 88–90) appears to quote the Sinfonia Concertante. Both works were written for the same player Friedrich Ramm.

Hugh Macdonald points out that Mozart offered a "rather lame excuse" to his father for why he did not bring the manuscript of the Sinfonia Concertante (and other works) back from Paris, and speculates that Mozart never actually wrote a sinfonia concertante for four winds and was attempting to hide that fact from his father. He also doubts that the extant Sinfonia Concertante could be an arrangement of a lost Mozart work, on the grounds that the clarinet part of the extant work is too idiomatic to the instrument to have been transcribed from a flute part.

The Sinfonia Concertante has declined in popularity today, but is regularly performed.
