= Friedrich Ramm =

Friedrich Ramm (1744–1813) was a German oboist for whom Wolfgang Amadeus Mozart wrote several works.

Ramm was principal oboist in the orchestra of Charles Theodore, Elector of Bavaria in Munich and in Mannheim, where Mozart first met him in 1777. Mozart the following year composed a Sinfonia Concertante for Ramm and several of his colleagues, thought to be or be related to the Sinfonia Concertante for Oboe, Clarinet, Horn, Bassoon and Orchestra K. 297b. In 1781, Mozart wrote his Oboe Quartet, K. 370 for Ramm, while the composer was staying in Munich to finish Idomeneo. (The opera's superb oboe part was also composed for Ramm.) In 1787 (14 March) Mozart participated in a benefit concert for Ramm in Vienna.
