= Laila Storch =

American oboist (1921–2022)

Laila Storch (February 28, 1921 – December 2, 2022) was an American oboist.

== Biography ==
She was the first woman oboist to graduate from the Curtis Institute in Philadelphia, where she studied with Marcel Tabuteau.

=== Career ===
Storch was the principal oboist for the Houston Symphony Orchestra, Carmel Bach Festival, the Bethlehem Bach Festival, Marlboro Music Festival, and the Casals Festivals. Additionally, she played with the National Symphony Orchestra, the Kansas City Philharmonic, and the Puerto Rico Symphony Orchestra. She was professor of oboe at the Conservatory of Music of Puerto Rico, for many years at the University of Washington and guest professor at Indiana University as well as the Central Conservatory of Music in Beijing, China. She was one of the longest serving members of the Soni Ventorum Wind Quintet.

Storch published a biography of her mentor Marcel Tabuteau, longtime Curtis Institute faculty member and world-renowned solo oboist (1915–1954) of the Philadelphia Orchestra, titled How Do You Expect to Play the Oboe If You Can’t Peel a Mushroom? (Indiana University Press).

Storch died on Orcas Island, Washington, on December 2, 2022, aged 101.

Beethoven's Prometheus Creatures Op. 43. No. 14: Solo della signora Casentini. Oboe: L. Storch. Basset horn: William McColl. Piano: Anita Cummings. Meany Theatre, 21 April 1986.

== Bibliography ==
- Storch, Laila (2008). Marcel Tabuteau: How Do You Expect to Play the Oboe If You Can't Peel a Mushroom?. Bloomington: Indiana University Press. ISBN 978-0-253-34949-1.
