= Leone Buyse =

American flutist (born 1947)

- Born: February 7, 1947 (age 79); Oneida, New York
- Genre: Classical
- Occupations: Musician, Educator
- Instruments: Flute, Piano

Leone Buyse (born February 7, 1947) is an American flutist, pianist, speaker, and educator. From July 1997 to July 2023 she served on the faculty of The Shepherd School of Music at Rice University, receiving the title professor emerita upon her retirement. Professor of Flute for four years at The University of Michigan, she previously held faculty appointments at the New England Conservatory and Boston University. Her orchestral career included positions with the Boston Symphony (assistant and acting principal flutist, 1983-90;1990-93), Boston Pops (principal flutist, 1983-1990), San Francisco Symphony (assistant principal flutist, 1978-83), and Rochester Philharmonic (second flute and solo piccolo, 1971-78). In 2010 she was honored with the National Flute Association’s Lifetime Achievement Award for outstanding contributions to the flute community worldwide.

== Biography ==
Leone Buyse was born on February 7, 1947, in Oneida, New York, the daughter of Leonard and Ione Hinman Buyse. Her mother, a pianist who earned a master's degree in theory from the Eastman School of Music, was her first piano teacher and both parents supported her early interest in music. While growing up in Ithaca, New York, she attended many concerts at Cornell University and heard renowned musicians of that time such as flutists Julius Baker and Albert Tipton, pianist Gina Bachauer, violinist Nathan Milstein, tenor Jussi Björling, guitarist Andres Segovia, and the famed French pedagogue Nadia Boulanger. This musical upbringing and exposure to world class musicians from an early age contributed greatly to her musical development.

Buyse's formal music training began at a very young age with piano lessons and then expanded to include flute lessons at age nine. When she was 12 she began studying with David Berman, Professor of Flute at Ithaca College (1954–1989), who was an extremely important foundational influence throughout her junior and senior high school years. At his suggestion Buyse applied to study with Joseph Mariano at the Eastman School of Music, from which she graduated with distinction and a performer's certificate in 1968. Awarded a Fulbright grant to study in France, Buyse attended the Paris Conservatory, where she first had lessons with Gaston Crunelle and the following year with Jean-Pierre Rampal, whose summer master classes she attended for three summers in Nice at l’Académie Internationale d’Été. During this time she studied privately with Michel Debost, at that time solo flutist of l’Orchestre de Paris, and also attended Marcel Moyse’s summer master class in Boswil, Switzerland. She attributes her style as a flutist and musician to the mentorship of those iconic French artist/teachers.

After returning to the United States, Buyse received a Master of Music degree in Flute Performance from Emporia State University (then Kansas State Teacher's College), while teaching undergraduate flute students and touring with the woodwind faculty in the Mid-America Woodwind Quintet. Her master's monograph, The French Rococo Style Exemplified in Selected Chamber Works of Joseph Bodin Boismortier (1689-1755), was published in The Emporia State Research Studies in 1979. In 1992, she received the Distinguished Alumna Award from Emporia State University.

Buyse’s first professional orchestral position was with the Rochester Philharmonic Orchestra as solo piccolo and second flute. She credits this position as having given her an opportunity to grow as an orchestral player, preparing her for subsequent positions in the San Francisco Symphony and later, the Boston Symphony.

In 1983, Buyse was invited by Seiji Ozawa to join the Boston Symphony as assistant principal of the symphony and principal of the Boston Pops under John Williams. During her decade with the BSO and Boston Pops, she appeared numerous times as a soloist with those orchestras and performed with the Boston Symphony Chamber Players. Throughout her Boston years she was a member of Boston Musica Viva, performed with the Muir String Quartet, and collaborated with numerous artists, recording with her BSO colleague Fenwick Smith and pianist Martin Amlin. In addition she taught at the New England Conservatory, Boston University, and Boston Conservatory. While playing the BSO’s summer season at Tanglewood she taught at Boston University's Tanglewood Institute and appeared in chamber concerts with international soloist Yo-Yo Ma and with the Juilliard String Quartet.

A devoted advocate of chamber music, she and clarinetist Michael Webster formed the Webster Trio in 1988, playing and recording over the next 30 years with pianists Martin Amlin, Katherine Collier, and the late Robert Moeling. Through commissions and Webster's published arrangements of four-hand piano works and operatic music they greatly expanded the repertoire for flute, clarinet, and piano. They promoted this repertoire while performing and teaching throughout North America and in New Zealand, Australia, Europe, and also Japan, as the Webster Trio Japan with pianist Chizuko Sawa.

In 1993 Buyse decided to pursue a more active career as soloist and teacher, accepting a professorship at The University of Michigan. After four years she moved to Houston to become Professor of Flute at Rice University. Her summer festival engagements have included two decades at the Sarasota Music Festival and appearances at Aspen, Norfolk, Orcas Island, Park City, Strings in the Mountains (Steamboat Springs), Sitka, Skaneateles, Music Academy (Santa Barbara), Texas Music Festival, and the Atlantic Music Festival. Since 2005 she has served as flute coach for Orchestra of the Americas, which currently functions as OAcademy, an intensive online diploma program.

Buyse has given recitals and masterclasses throughout the United States and in Mexico, Brazil, Panama, Chile, Italy, France, The Netherlands, Canada, Japan, Australia, and New Zealand. She has appeared as soloist with l'Orchestre de la Suisse Romande (Geneva), San Francisco Symphony, Utah Symphony, Orquesta Sinfónica Nacional (Mexico City), and the New Hampshire Music Festival, of which she was principal flute for over a decade.

Buyse is a flute educator whose students have held positions in orchestras including the Boston Symphony Orchestra, San Francisco Symphony, Houston Symphony, Detroit Symphony Orchestra, Baltimore Symphony Orchestra, and Toronto Symphony Orchestra. Her former students have also held teaching positions at institutions including Rice University, the University of Colorado Boulder, and St. Olaf College. Buyse is also a pianist and served as a collaborative pianist for Jean-Pierre Rampal's summer classes in Nice, France.

In 2010 Buyse was awarded the National Flute Association's Lifetime Achievement Award for outstanding contributions to the global flute community. She retired from her position at Rice University at the end of June 2023 and currently serves on the faculty of OAcademy, the Texas Music Festival, and the Atlantic Music Festival.

== Personal life ==
In 1987 Buyse married Michael Webster, former principal clarinetist of the Rochester Philharmonic, who subsequently taught at the New England Conservatory, Boston University, and for 26 years at Rice University. He is artistic director of the award-winning Houston Youth Symphony.

== Discography ==
Solo

The Sky’s the Limit (Crystal, 1993)

Contrasts: American Music for Flute and Harp (Boston Records, 1994)

Rivier Revisited (Crystal, 2002)

Dedicated to Barrère (Crystal, 2006)

Dedicated to Barrère, Vol. 2 (Crystal, 2007)

Webster Trio / Webster Trio Japan

Tour de France (Crystal, 1997)

World Wide Webster (Crystal, 2004)

American Webster (Crystal, 2016)

Sonata Cho-Cho San (Nami/LiveNotes, 1997)

From Vienna to Budapest (Camerata Tokyo, 2009)

Selected Chamber

American Vistas: Music for Flute, Voice, Clarinet & Piano (Albany, 2009)

Martin Amlin: Music for Flute, Clarinet & Piano (Albany Records, 2015)

Harbison: Words from Paterson (Elektra/Nonesuch 79189-2). Boston Symphony Chamber Players

Of Angels and Shepherds (CRI 883). Flute concerti of Richard Toensing with Theodore Kuchar and the National Symphony of Ukraine. Available on Amazon.
