= Felix Skowronek =

American flutist and professor (1935–2006)

Felix Skowronek (August 21, 1935 – April 17, 2006) was an American flutist and professor of music.

== Education ==
Skowronek studied in Seattle with Fred H. Wing and Frank Horsfall, and for a few summers with Donald Peck. He later studied with William Kincaid at the Curtis Institute of Music.

== Career ==
Skowronek played principal flute for the Seattle Symphony (1956–57 and 1959–60), Seventh Army Symphony (1957–59), Puerto Rico Symphony Orchestra (1960–66), and St. Louis Symphony (1966–68), and was a member of the Casals Festival orchestra in Puerto Rico. He was a founding member of the Soni Ventorum Wind Quintet.

He became a member of the faculty of the Conservatory of Music of Puerto Rico, followed by the University of Washington. He also served as president of the National Flute Association and Seattle Flute Society.

He was a leading figure in the revival of wooden Boehm-style flutes in the USA. He was an expert in the use of various hardwoods in flute manufacturing. He was also a consultant with Verne Q. Powell Flutes Inc. in its attempt to reintroduce the wooden flute to the United States on a major scale.
