= Sinfonia concertante in E flat major =

There are two compositions with this title:

- Sinfonia concertante in E flat major K.364 (320d) by Wolfgang Amadeus Mozart
- Sinfonia concertante in E flat major K. 297b (Anh. C 14.01) perhaps an arrangement of a lost work by Mozart but the authorship is debated.
