= Soni Ventorum Wind Quintet =

American wind quintet

Soni Ventorum
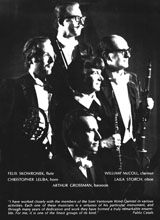

Longest-serving Members
- Felix Skowronek (1935–2006), Flute; Laila Storch (1921–2022), Oboe; William McColl (1933–2024), Clarinet; Arthur Grossman, Bassoon; David Kappy, Horn

Prior Membership
- James Caldwell (1939–2006), Oboe, member from 1962 to 1965; Christopher Leuba (Pictured in photo above), horn, member from 1962 to 1963 and from 1968 through 1979; Robert Bonnevie, horn, member from 1963 to 1967; Alex Klein, oboe, member from 1992 to 1994; Rebecca Henderson, oboe, member from 1996 to 1998; Peter Kern, Flute, member from 1966 to 1968; Sidney Rosenberg, bassoon, member, 1977 – 1978 season David Sternbach, horn, member, 1967–1968 season Dan Williams, oboe, member, 1995–1996 season Tad Margelli, oboe, frequent guest

Website
- www.soniventorum.com

The Soni Ventorum Wind Quintet was an American wind quintet that was officially founded in 1962 when Pablo Casals asked its members to become the woodwind faculty of his newly founded Conservatory of Music of Puerto Rico. It is known worldwide for its many international tours sponsored by the United States Department of State including three tours of South America and three of Europe. Over 25 original chamber works for winds have been written for the members of Soni Ventorum including compositions by Claude Arrieu, William Bergsma, Jean Francaix, Gerald Kechley, Joseph Goodman, John Verrall, and William O. Smith. In 1972 the quintet won the silver medal at the International Instrumental Ensembles Competition (Festival Villa-Lobos) in Rio de Janeiro.

The group had a long and stable history. Through its concerts, tours, and recordings, the Soni Ventorum Wind Quintet established an international reputation. For many years (beginning in 1968) Soni Ventorum was also the wind quintet-in-residence at the University of Washington School of Music.

== History ==
The quintet was founded in 1962 by Felix Skowronek, William McColl, Arthur Grossman, James Caldwell, and Christopher Leuba. Skowronek, McColl, and Grossman had been in the Seventh Army Symphony Orchestra in the 1950s and had formed the Seventh Army Wind Quintet. Members of the ensemble were on faculty at the Conservatory of Music of Puerto Rico, members of the Puerto Rico Symphony, and participants in the annual Casals Festival. During its years in Puerto Rico, the quintet went on several concert tours to the US mainland, which led to recording opportunities with the Lyrichord label.

In 1968 Soni Ventorum was hired by the University of Washington School of Music as the resident Woodwind Quintet. The group was active through June 2001.

== Discography ==
Year	Title	Genre	Label	Notes
1963	Works by Mozart and Villa-Lobos	Classical LP	Lyrichord LLST 7168	Reviewed: The New Records, March 1965; Audio, April 1965
1964	"A Festival of Winds," Works by Hamerik and Morris	Classical LP	Desto 6401	Featuring the Soni Ventorum Quintet and the New York Brass Quintet
1964	"Music for the Musical Clock" Works by Beethoven and Haydn, arr. Skowronek	Classical LP	Lyrichord LLST 7143	Reviewed: The New Records, July 1965; High Fidelity, November 1965; The Grammophone, May 1967; Records and Recordings, September 1967
1965	Music of Walter Piston, Ernst Krenek and Joseph Goodman	Classical LP	Lyrichord LLST 7158	Reviewed: High Fidelity, October 1966; Saturday Review (listed in "Year's Best Recordings"), November, 1966
1968	Electro-Vibrations: the Music of John Eaton	Classical LP	Decca DL71065	Microtonal techniques
1969	Quintets by Reicha and Danzi	Classical LP	Lyrichord LLST 7216	Reviewed: The New Records, May 1970
1970	Cambini: Trois Quintetti Concertans	Classical LP	Ravenna RAVE701	The New Records, July 1973; High Fidelity and Musical America, August 1972
1972	"Soni Ventorum Plays Poulenc and Villa-Lobos"	Classical LP	Musical Heritage Society MHS3187	Also released as a reel-to-reel 7.5 IPS 4-track Barclay-Crocker tape, MHS C3187
1972	"Soni Ventorum Plays Villa-Lobos"	Classical LP	Ravenna RAVE702	Reviewed: High Fidelity and Musical America, May 1973; Stereo Review,May 1973 "Recording of special merit"
1972	Two Quintets by Anton Reicha	Classical LP	Musical Heritage Society MHS 3248	
1975	Two Quintets by Franz Danzi	Classical LP	Crystal S 251	Reviewed: The New Records, June 1976. Re-released in 2011 in CD format
1976	"Winds from the Northwest"	Classical LP	Crystal S 351	Flute and Bassoon. Reviewed: The New Records, June 1976
1977	Quintets by Paul Taffanel, Jean Martinon and Claude Arrieu	Classical LP	Crystal S 253	Reviewed: The New Records, September 1978; Fanfare, Jan./Feb., 1979; Consumers' Research, January 1979. The Taffanel quintet was re-released in 2011 in CD format.
1978	Works by Françaix, Arrieu, Ketting and Gerster	Classical LP	Crystal S 254	Reviewed: The Clarinet, Winter 1983; The New Records, July 1981; Cosmopolitan, June 1981
1980	"Music of Joseph Goodman and Joseph Alexander"	Classical LP	Serenus Recorded Editions SRS 12097	Reviewed: Fanfare, July/August 1882; The New Records, May 1982
1981	Four Quintets of Franz Danzi	Classical LP	Musical Heritage Society MHS 4621	Reviewed: Fanfare, May/June 1982
1981	"Music for Woodwinds, Chamber Ensemble and Voice" Works by W.O. Smith, Diane Thom and Joseph Goodman	Classical LP	Crystal S 257	With Montserrat Alavedra, soprano. Reviewed: The Clarinet, Spring 1984; The New Records, February 1984
1981	Quintets by Samuel Barber, Elliott Carter, Irving Fine and Joseph Goodman	Classical LP	Musical Heritage Society MHS 4782F	Reviewed: Fanfare, March/April 1984
1981	"Two Quintets for Piano and Winds" The Mozart and Beethoven Quintets	Classical LP	Musical Heritage Society MHS 4375	
1982	Quintets by Carl Nielsen and Jean Françaix	Classical LP and CD	Musical Heritage Society MHS 7132K	
1984	Works by Bergsma, Goodman, Zaninelli and Etler	Classical LP	Crystal S 258	Reviewed: The New Records, October 1985; Ovation, November 1985; Fanfare, November/December 1985; American Record Guide, January/February 1986
1985	"Six Works for Wind Quintet" Quintets by Ibert, Hindemith and Milhaud plus encores by Rimski-Korsakov, Fučik and Blanchet	Classical LP	Musical Heritage Society MHS 7364L	
1986	Six Quartets of Rossini and Twelve Bagatelles of Mayr	Classical 2-LP set	Musical Heritage Society MHS 922024A	
1990	"Soni Ventorum Plays Works of Jean Françaix and Ronald Roseman"	Classical CD	Musical Heritage Society 512759Y	
1992	Schoenberg Quintet, Op. 26 and W.O.Smith, Jazz Set for Wind Quintet and Solo Violin	Classical CD	Musical Heritage Society 51422K	With Aloysia Friedmann, Violin
2011	"Danzi and Taffanel. Soni Ventorum Wind Quintet"	Classical CD	Crystal CD 251	Digitized remastering. Reviewed: Instrumentalist, July 2011; De Klarinet (Netherlands), July/August 2011; Fluit (Netherlands), September 2011; Fanfare, January/February 2012; The Horn Call, February 2012; The Flutist Quarterly, Fall 2011; Audiophile Audition – Classical Reissues, February 24, 2012; The Double Reed, Quarterly Journal of the International Double Reed Society Vol. 35 . No.1 July 2012
2013	"Music for the Musical Clock – Haydn, Beethoven and Mozart"	Classical mp3	Lyrichord LYR 6018	Digitized remastering of Lyrichord LLST 7143 and part of LLST 7168. mp3 download only. Reviewed: MusicWeb International, 2013–2014
2013	"Joseph Goodman – Walter Piston – Ernst Krenek – Heitor Villa-Lobos"	Classical mp3	Lyrichord LYR 6924	Digitized remastering of Lyrichord LLST 7158 and part of LLST 7168. mp3 download only.
2013	Quintets by Reicha and Danzi	Classical mp3	Lyrichord LYR 6020	Digitized remastering of Lyrichord LLST 7216. mp3 download only. Reviewed: MusicWeb International, 2013–2014
