= Oboe Quartet (Mozart) =

1781 composition by W. A. Mozart

The Oboe Quartet in F major, K. 370/368b, was written by Wolfgang Amadeus Mozart in early 1781. The quartet is scored for oboe, violin, viola and violone basso or cello. In 1780, Mozart was invited to Munich to visit Elector Karl Theodor, who had commissioned the opera Idomeneo for a carnival celebration. While in Munich, Mozart renewed an acquaintance with Friedrich Ramm, a virtuoso oboist in the Munich orchestra. It was for Ramm that Mozart composed the quartet in order to show off his virtuosity and the improvements that had been made to the oboe at that time. One way that this piece showed off the instrument was the use of the "high F" above the staff, a note rarely played in any repertoire previously written for the oboe.

== Structure ==
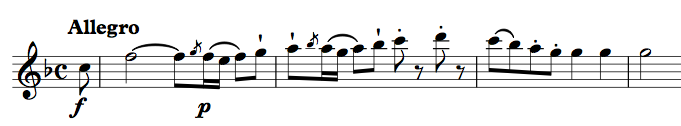
Main theme in the first movement, as played by the oboe in the opening bars

This piece is a work of chamber music, but it has elements that harken to other musical genres, and requires a fair amount of virtuosity. Because of its large amount of virtuosic playing on the part of the oboe and the large degree to which the strings simply accompany the oboist, it almost resembles a concerto, but with only four players instead of an entire orchestra. Despite this, there are also a number of places within the work that require ensemble playing, for example, the famous 13-bar passage in the finale in which the oboe plays in cut time against a 6/8 accompaniment.

Oboe Quartet in F major, K. 370
1. Allegro

2. Adagio

3. Rondeau: Allegro
Performed by Laila Storch (oboe) with the Philadelphia String Quartet

There are three movements:

1. Allegro – (common time)
2. Adagio – D minor, 3/4
3. Rondeau: Allegro – 6/8

A performance takes around 15 minutes.
