= Charles McShane =

American football player (born 1954)

No. 90, 59
- Position: Linebacker

Personal information
- Born: January 4, 1954 (age 72); Long Beach, California, U.S.
- Listed height: 6 ft 3 in (1.91 m)
- Listed weight: 203 lb (92 kg)

Career information
- High school: R.A. Millikan (Long Beach)
- College: Cal Lutheran
- NFL draft: 1976: 12th round, 346th overall pick

Career history
- Dallas Cowboys (1976)*; Seattle Seahawks (1977–1979)
- * Offseason or practice squad member only

Awards and highlights
- Second-team NAIA District II (1974); All-Lutheran (1975); NAIA District III All-American (1975); UPI Little All-Coast (1975); Third-team Little All-American (1975); NAIA District III Player of the Year (1975)

Career NFL statistics
- Games played: 29
- Stats at Pro Football Reference

Charles Shawn McShane (born January 4, 1954) is an American former professional football player who was a linebacker in the National Football League (NFL) for the Seattle Seahawks. He played college football for the Cal Lutheran Kingsmen.

== Early life and college ==
McShane attended Robert A. Millikan High School, where he practiced football and track. He enrolled at Long Beach City College after graduating from high school.

He transferred to California Lutheran College after his sophomore season to play defensive tackle under Kingsmen head coach Bob Shoup. As a junior, McShane was named NAIA District II second-team, receiving the team's Iron Man and most valuable lineman awards.

As a senior, he was named NAIA District III first-team All-American, third-team Associated Press Little All-American, UPI Little All-Coast, First-team All-Lutheran and NAIA District III Player of the Year. He also was a part of the 1976 undefeated track team, competing in the javelin throw.

In 2008, he was inducted into the California Lutheran University Alumni Association Athletic Hall of Fame.

== Professional career ==
=== Dallas Cowboys ===
McShane was selected by the Dallas Cowboys in the 12th round (346th overall) of the 1976 NFL draft, with the intention of being converted into a linebacker. He was waived on September 6.

=== Seattle Seahawks ===
On April 29, 1977, he was signed as a free agent by the Seattle Seahawks. He played mainly on special teams. He had 10 tackles and one forced fumble against the Buffalo Bills. He blocked a field goal against the Houston Oilers.

In 1978, he played mainly on special teams. He had 5 tackles against the Minnesota Vikings. On September 5, 1979, he was released after playing in the season opener against the San Diego Chargers.
