= Ron Brown (linebacker) =

American football player (born 1967)

Michael Ron Brown
No. 96, 64
- Position: Linebacker

Personal information
- Born: February 13, 1967 (age 59); Long Beach, California, U.S.
- Listed height: 6 ft 4 in (1.93 m)
- Listed weight: 225 lb (102 kg)

Career information
- High school: Millikan (Long Beach); Bishop Amat (La Puente, California)
- College: USC
- NFL draft: 1987: 8th round, 204th overall pick

Career history
- San Diego Chargers (1987)*; Los Angeles Raiders (1987–1988)
- * Offseason or practice squad member only

Career NFL statistics
- Sacks: 2
- Fumble recoveries: 1
- Stats at Pro Football Reference

Michael Ron Brown (born February 13, 1967) is an American former professional football player who was a linebacker in the National Football League (NFL) from 1987 to 1989 for the San Diego Chargers and then traded to the Los Angeles Raiders. After playing college football for the USC Trojans, he was selected by the Chargers in the eighth round of the 1987 NFL draft with the 204th overall pick. Brown forsook what might have been a promising track career to play football. While at high school in 1982, he had the seventh-fastest prep high hurdles time in the country, 13.82 seconds.

He recalled that he regularly beat Danny Harris of Perris High in the 300-meter low hurdles. Harris went on to earn a silver medal in the 400-meter hurdles at the 1984 Olympic Games.

Brown's hurdling career took a detour in 1983 when he tore ligaments in his left knee, requiring surgery. A football-related injury to his right knee forced him to red-shirt in 1984.
