= Arthur Grossman =

American bassoonist and professor of music

Arthur Grossman is an American bassoonist and professor of music.

== Education ==
His primary teacher was Sol Schoenbach of the Curtis Institute of Music and he took chamber music classes with Marcel Tabuteau.

== Career ==
He served as principal bassoon for the Indianapolis Symphony, the Cincinnati Symphony, and the Israel Philharmonic. He became faculty for the Conservatory of Music of Puerto Rico followed by the University of Washington. During his tenure at the University of Washington, he also served as Associate Dean for Arts of the College of Arts and Sciences, a position which he held for 10 years.

He is a founding member of the Soni Ventorum Wind Quintet and he has recorded solo and chamber works on Musical Heritage, and Crystal labels.

Grossman is known among classical musicians and critics for his "technical facility", his "attention to musical detail" and a "dark, velvety tone quality". He is also recognized in the United States as a notable player of the heckelphone.
