= Bonita Boyd =

American flutist (born 1949)

Bonita Boyd (born August 1, 1949) is an American flutist, soloist and pedagogue. She has been the professor of flute at the Eastman School of Music since 1977, when she succeeded her mentor Joseph Mariano. Her primary teachers include Mariano, Maurice Sharp of the Cleveland Orchestra, and Roger Stevens of the Los Angeles Philharmonic. In 1971, she became the youngest principal flutist (at age 21) of a major American orchestra after winning the positions of principal flute with the Rochester Philharmonic. Following this position, her Alice Tully Hall debut was received as "a great success" and subsequent tour performances harkened her comparisons to Jean-Pierre Rampal and Sir James Galway. Boyd was principal flutist with the Aspen Festival Orchestra, Chautauqua Symphony and Filarmonica de las Americas.

== Biography ==
Bonita Boyd was born in Pittsburgh, but later moved with her family to Long Beach, California. Soprano Cheryl Boyd-Waddell is her sister. She played piano and flute growing up, while studying privately with Maurice Sharp of the Cleveland Orchestra, and Roger Stevens of the Los Angeles Philharmonic. Occasionally, she would participate in competitions with both piano and flute pieces. before moving to study with Joseph Mariano at Eastman. She succeeded both of his positions at Eastman and the Rochester Philharmonic, making her the youngest principal flutist and the youngest person to hold both major academic and orchestral positions. She kept her position with the philharmonic until 1984, when she pursued a more active solo career. Since that time, she has performed as a soloist with the National Gallery Orchestra, National Symphony of the Dominican Republic, Chautauqua Symphony, Concerto Soloists of Philadelphia, Denver Chamber Orchestra, Buffalo Philharmonic, Pusan (Korea) Symphony Orchestra, Western Australia Symphony, Queensland Symphony, Polish Radio Orchestra, and Vilnius (Lithuania) Chamber Orchestra.

She was awarded the National Flute Association's Lifetime Achievement Award in 2012, an organization where she had previously served as president. Additionally, she has been awarded the Eisenhart Award for Excellence in Teaching by the Eastman School of Music. Boyd is collaborating and touring with guitarist Nicholas Goluses.

== Personal life ==
She was married to Swedish engineer Christian Soderstrom and together, the couple had three sons.
