= Millikan High School =

Robert A. Millikan Senior High School

Location
- 2800 Snowden Avenue; Long Beach, California 90815; United States; 33.8078°N 118.1106°W

Information
- Type: Public
- Motto: Pathway To Excellence And Integrity
- Established: 1956
- School district: Long Beach Unified School District
- Superintendent: David Zaid
- Principal: Dr. Stacie Alexander
- Teaching staff: 135.67 (FTE)
- Grades: 9–12
- Enrollment: 3,359 (2025–2026)
- Student to teacher ratio: 25.12
- Campus: Suburban
- Colors: Blue; Gold
- Athletics conference: Moore League
- Mascot: Robbie and Millie Ram
- Team name: Rams
- Rival: Lakewood High School
- Website: millikan.lbschools.net

Ethnic composition as of 2020–21
Race and ethnicity	Total
Hispanic or Latino	46.4%
Non-Hispanic White/Anglo	32.2%
African American	8.5%
Asian	8.1%
Other	3.9%
Pacific Islander	0.8%
Native American	0.1%

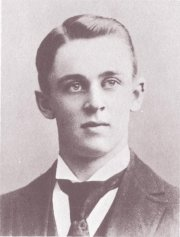
Robert Millikan

Robert A. Millikan Senior High School is a high school in Long Beach, California, United States, administered by the Long Beach Unified School District. It is near the intersection of Spring Street and Palo Verde Avenue in the Los Altos neighborhood of East Long Beach on a 36-acre campus. Millikan High School has around 3,500 students. Millikan is an AP school and does not offer IB courses.

== Name ==
Millikan High School is named after the Nobel Prize winner Robert Andrews Millikan.

== Music ==
The school has a choral program and an instrumental music program. The music ensembles compete in festivals.

== Athletics ==
Millikan teams include Cross Country, Tennis, Badminton, Water Polo, Dance, Football, Colorguard, Golf, Surf, Marching Band, Basketball, Volleyball, Beach Volleyball, Soccer, Wrestling, Baseball, Gymnastics, Swim, Softball, Track, Water polo, Lacrosse, and Cheer Some sports are co-ed while others are not. 2018 marked the first year for a female to score a point for the Millikan Rams varsity football.

== Newspaper ==
Millikan's newspaper is TheCorydon. It has been running since 1956.

== Notable alumni ==
- Susie Atwood, double Olympic medalist, 1972 Olympics, backstroke
- Ryan Bailey, Olympic water polo player
- Greg Barton, NFL player
- Jason Bell, NFL player
- Jennifer Bermingham, professional golfer
- Nick Bierbrodt, baseball player
- Cheryl Boyd-Waddell, soprano
- Ron Brown, NFL player
- Courtney Clements, former WNBA player
- Alden Darby, NFL player
- Tacario Davis, professional football cornerback for the Cincinnati Bengals
- Marcus Dove, basketball player
- Audie England, Actor
- Dave Frost, professional baseball player
- Mike Gallo, professional baseball player
- Gary Garrison, professional football player with San Diego Chargers
- Bud Gaugh, Sublime Drummer.
- Jack Grisham, TSOL vocalist, author An American Demon: A Memoir
- Gene Hoglan, metal musician
- Soben Huon, Miss Utah USA 2006
- Wendi McLendon-Covey, actress on ABC's The Goldbergs, actress on Comedy Central's Reno 911!, and the film Bridesmaids
- Charles McShane, NFL player
- Mike Montgomery, Golden State Warriors and University of California basketball coach
- Tino Nuñez, professional soccer player
- Syd O'Brien, professional baseball player
- Brent Poppen, author, motivational speaker and Paralympian
- Dante Powell, professional baseball player
- Greg Sampson, football player, sixth pick of 1972 NFL draft
- Chris Saunders, UFC, The Ultimate Fighter: Live - Season 15
- Ann Simmons, Olympic competition swimmer
- Jonathan Singleton, professional baseball player
- Spencer Steer, professional baseball player
- Craig Swan, professional baseball player
- John Tautolo, NFL player
- Terry Tautolo, NFL player
- Mike Tully, pole vaulter, 1984 Summer Olympics silver medalist
- Brian Turang, professional baseball player
- Greg Williamson, professional football player
