= John Joseph Davye =

American choral conductor and composer

John Joseph Davye (October 19, 1929 – September 25, 2007) was an American choral conductor and a composer of choral and chamber music. He finished his career as a teacher, composer, director, and festival adjudicator as Professor Emeritus of Music at Old Dominion University, Norfolk, VA. He held degrees from the University of Miami (FL) 1952 and Ithaca College (NY) 1965 where he studied composition with Warren Benson. His compositions, including the published and the yet to be published, were played at a wide variety of universities and churches, and on the radio; his work was funded in part by the National Endowment for the Arts as well as the arts commissions of Virginia and Norfolk.

== Works and Biography ==
For almost 40 years John J. Davye had his music published by Associated Music Publishers, Inc. (NYC/London); Augsburg Publishing House (Minneapolis, Minn.); Crystal Spring Music Publishers, Inc. (Roanoke, VA); Mark Foster Music Co. (Champaign, Ill.); muSic eSpreSS, inc. (Tempe, AZ) and World Library Publications, Inc. (Cincinnati, Ohio).

Before his publications his compositions had been performed on the campuses of Capital University (Ohio); East Carolina University (N.C.); Hollins College (VA); University of Kansas; James Madison University (VA); Manhattan School of Music (NYC); ODU; Penn State University; University of South Florida; St. Olaf College (Minn.); Tennessee Tech University, and West Virginia University, among others.

Professor Davye's larger works include, Cry of Anguish, Song of Praise (Psalm 22) for chorus of Mixed Voices, Organ and Brass Quartet, which was commissioned by the First Lutheran Church of Norfolk in commemoration of the 500th anniversary of the birth of Martin Luther; Symphony in One Movement, commissioned by ODU in celebration of its Golden Anniversary, and Four Days From My Life, a ballet in five scenes which had its premiere performances funded partially by the National Endowment for the Arts, Virginia Commission for the Arts, and the Norfolk Commission on the Arts and Humanities.

For nearly 30 years Professor Davye was choral director at University and High School levels.

Before coming to ODU in 1966, Professor Davye was for a public school music educator at the high school level for 11 years. Nine of those years as director of a prestigious high school music program in New York state, while teaching at Owego Free Academy, Owego, N.Y. There he directed 5 choirs that had a total enrollment of 250, in a school that had a student population of 800. His group's broadcast around the world over Voice-of -America Radio; performed in two different years in the New York State Pavilion at the New York World's Fair, and appeared in Concert for the United States Senate in Washington, D.C.

For 17 years (1966–83) Professor Davye was the Director of the ODU Concert-Choir. During this time the Choir made numerous appearances with the Norfolk Symphony Orchestra; performed several times over 7 of the world's largest radio networks; appeared at state, regional, national and international conferences and conventions.

In 1975-76 the ODU Choir performed at the John F. Kennedy Center for the Performing Arts in Washington, D.C. as part of the Bicentennial Parade of American Music, and also at the Loyola University Bicentennial Collegiate Choral Festival in New Orleans, LA. The Choir regularly toured in Virginia, Maryland, Delaware, Pennsylvania, New Jersey and New York.

He was a member of the American Choral Directors Association, American Society of University Composers, American Association of University Professors, Music Educators National Conference, and an honorary life member of Iota Tau chapter of Phi Mu Alpha Sinfonia fraternity. John Davye is included in several biographical sources, among them International Who's Who in Music and Musicians Directory, 1990/91 and Who's Who in American Music: Classical.

In the fall of 1967, Davye founded the Tidewater Chorale which he directed until 1976. Professor Davye was one of nine original founding members of the Tidewater Composer's Guild in 1979.

In 1985 he founded the Composition program at the newly established Governor's School for the Arts, in Norfolk, VA. Professor Davye was also a frequent festival adjudicator throughout the eastern U.S. and Canada.

On December 31, 1997 Professor Davye suffered a stroke.

On September 25, 2007, Professor John J. Davye died in his home in Norfolk, Virginia.

== Published and Unpublished Compositions ==
=== Ballet ===
FOUR DAYS FROM MY LIFE -1990 Ballet in five scenes (chamber orch. of 11) Premiere performances funded partially by the National Endowment for the Arts, Virginia Commission for the Arts, and the Norfolk Commission on the Arts and Humanities

=== Chamber ===
CANONIC FANTASY FOR TWO FLUTES -1974

FANFARE for Trumpets and Timpani -1992 (DHQ) Commissioned by the Office of the president, Old Dominion University for the dedication of the Fine and Performing Arts Center and the Visual Arts Building

SONATINA FOR CLARINET, VIOLIN AND CELLO

THREE EPISODES FOR BRASS CHOIR -1975

=== Choral ===
A CHILD IS BORN TO US -1968 (AMP) Christmas Choral Cycle for full chorus of Treble Voices

CRY OF ANGUISH, SONG OF PRAISE - Psalm 22 -1983 for chorus of Mixed Voices, Organ and Brass Quartet. Commissioned by the First Lutheran Church, Norfolk, VA, in commemoration of the 500th Anniversary of the birth of Martin Luther

MISSA BREVIS -1967 (AMP) Mass for chorus of Mixed Voices

PSALM 93 – 1957 (APH) Introit for the first Sunday after Christmas for Chorus or Solo Voices of any combination

PRAYER OF SAINT FRANCIS -1995 for Four-Part Choir of Mixed Voices, Two-Part Ensemble of Treble Voices and Organ. Commissioned for the choirs of St. Mary Magdalene Roman Catholic Church and School, Melvindale, Michigan. Composed for the February 1–8, 1996 appearances in Italy at St. Peter's, Basilica-Vatican City, Rome for the high Mass with Pope John Paul II, at the Basilica of St. Francis-Assisi and the church of St. Ignatius Loyola- Rome

TENEBRAE FACTAE SUNT - Darkness Fell on the Earth -1960 (AMP) for Men's Chorus

THE SPIRIT OF THE LORD GOD IS UPON ME -1962 (MFM) Concert Anthem for chorus of Mixed Voices

THY GLORY DAWNS, JERUSALEM, AWAKE -1969 (WLSM) Palm Sunday Anthem for chorus of Mixed Voices and organ

=== Orchestral ===
ELEGIAC AIR AND DANCE FOR STRING for youth orchestra

SINFONIETTA FOR STRING ORCHESTRA -1976

SYMPHONY IN ONE MOVEMENT -1980 Commissioned by Old Dominion University for the Golden Jubilee Celebration of the University

=== Piano ===
PARTITA PICCOLA -1981 (CSMP) for youth. Commissioned for the Hollins College (VA) Preparatory Division of the Department of Music

RONDO VARIATIONS - 1975

SONATINE FOR TWO PIANOS -1978 Commissioned by the Portsmouth (VA.) Music Study Club

=== Vocal ===
TWO PSALMS OF MEDITATION -1978 (muS. espr.) for high Voice and Organ

=== Miscellaneous ===
CANTUS -1985 solo instrument, non-keyboard:Cello

SONATA BREVE -1995 for Organ

THE WISDOM OF SOLOMON -1957

SOLILOQUY FOR BRASS AND WOOD WINDS -1958

COMMUNION SERVICE -1957

SPIRITUALS FOR ORCHESTRA – 1956

LORD WHO SHALL DWELL IN THY TABERNACLE -1956

GO YE THEREFORE AND TEACH -1956

== Legacy ==
The John Davye Collection in the Diehn Composers Room of the Old Dominion University Library contains seventeen seven inch audio reels, three five inch ones, and one tape cassette, spanning the years from 1971 to 1992.
