= Liz Goodwin =

British businesswoman and environmentalist

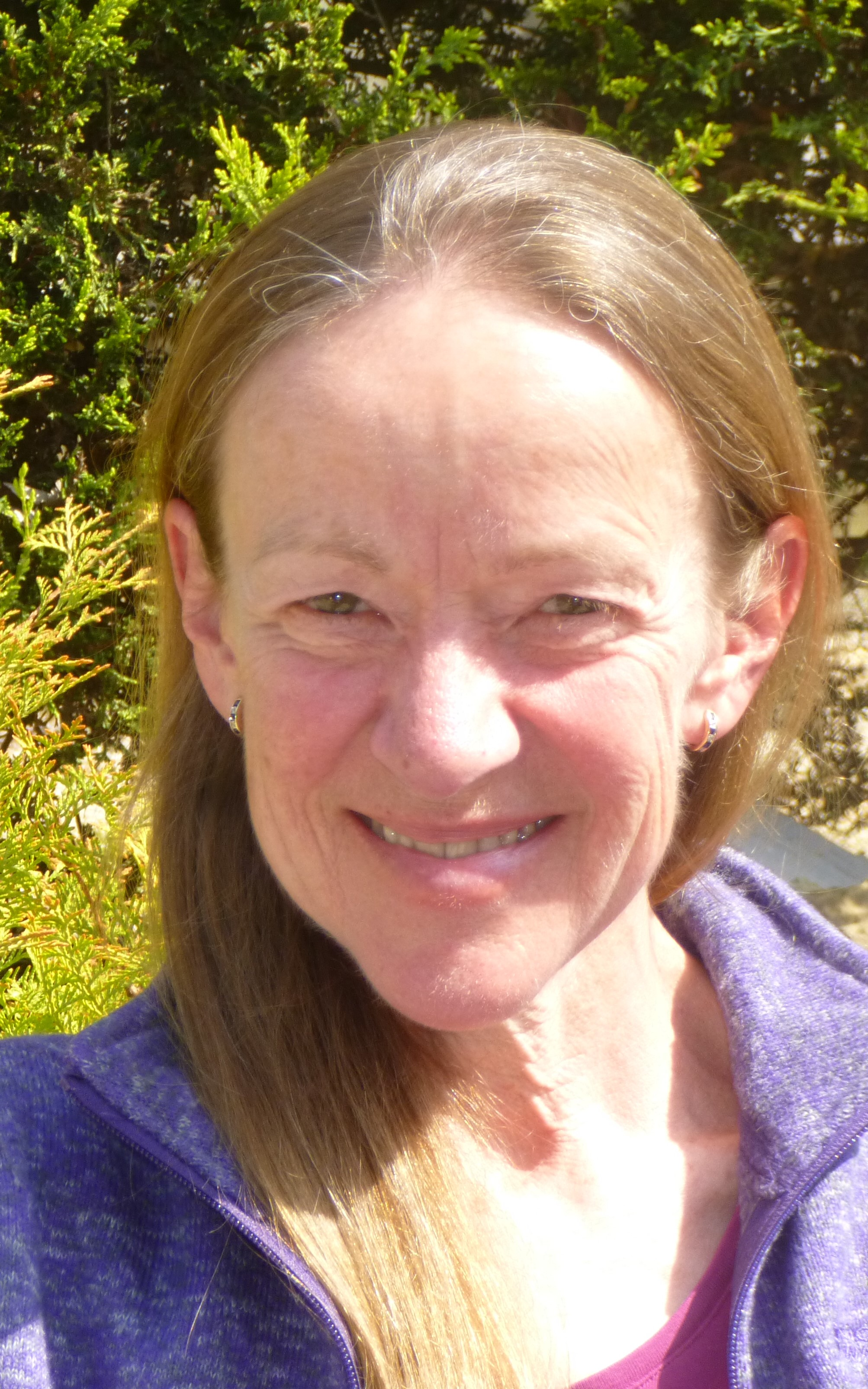

Elizabeth Jane Goodwin OBE (born 6 June 1961) is a British businesswoman and environmentalist.

She is the Senior fellow and Director of Food Loss and Waste for WRI (World Resources Institute).

She was previously the CEO of the waste reduction charity, WRAP (Waste & Resources Action Programme) from 2007 to 2016. In 2015, she was recognised in the Queen's Birthday Honours list and received an OBE for her services to business resource efficiency and the environment.

== Early life ==
Goodwin was born in June 1961 in London.

== Education ==
Goodwin attended Chichester High School For Girls from 1972 to 1979. After leaving Chichester High School for Girls, she went on to study a BSc in Chemistry at UCL, and following that, completed a PhD in Chemical physics from the University of Exeter. In 2010, Cranfield University honoured Goodwin with an honorary Doctor of Science, in recognition of her achievements in environmental, recycling and resource efficiency issues. The Society for the Environment also elected Goodwin as an Honorary Fellow of the Society for the Environment in December 2013, in recognition to her services to the environment.

== Career ==
Goodwin started her earlier career as a Research Scientist for ICI, before working as an environment manager for Zeneca Agrochemicals, and then Syngenta as an Environmental Advisor.

=== WRAP ===
Goodwin became CEO at WRAP in 2007 having worked for the organisation since its early days, joining in 2001 as the first Director of Materials Programme. After taking over as CEO, she worked to raise the profile of WRAP and the issues of resource efficiency, waste and recycling. The organisation is now focused on helping deliver the economic benefits of a more circular economy.

Under Goodwin's leadership, the Courtauld Commitment, involving major retailers, brands and their supply chains, has been driven forward and reductions in packaging have been achieved despite growth in sales. The problem of food waste is now widely understood and progress is being made in tackling this serious issue, with a 21% reduction in avoidable food waste being reported in late 2013. WRAP continues to work with local authorities and the wider resource management sector to ensure that waste that is recycled where possible.

Along with industry initiatives, two new consumer campaigns, Love Food Hate Waste, and Love Your Clothes, have been launched under Goodwin's leadership, joining WRAP's other consumer campaign, Recycle Now, which aims to increase household recycling.

Goodwin sought to ensure that there was a business case for WRAP's work, which would help ensure longer term viability and sustainability, and ways to deliver economic benefits.

In February 2016 Goodwin announced that she would be stepping down as CEO of WRAP at the end June 2016.

=== WRI ===
Goodwin joined the World Resources Institute (WRI) in September 2016 as its first Senior Fellow and Director of Food Loss and Wastehttps://www.wri.org/profile/liz-goodwin. She is also a Champion of the UN sustainable goal 12.3 to halve food waste across the globe by 2030. Her role at WRI is very much to seek to achieve this ambitious target of the UN by engaging all of the Champions throughout the World and bringing about sustainable change in how much food is wasted by producers, throughout the supply chains and by consumers.

During 2021 Goodwin led the work on food loss and waste for the UN Food System Summit that was held in September of that year. This resulted in significant government involvement, around the globe, in achieving the UN Sustainability Development Goal 12.3.

=== ReLondon (formerly LWARB) ===
In February 2017, the Mayor of London, Sadiq Khan, appointed Goodwin as the Chair of the London Waste and Recycling Board (LWARB) in 2020 the name was changed to ReLondon to better reflect the substance of what the organisation does being the promotion of resource efficiency in London.

Goodwin has been asked by Sadiq Khan to mastermind the achievement of a number of goals by ReLondon including getting the capital on the path to increasing the recycling rate substantially by 2030; creating jobs in reuse, repair, re-manufacturing and materials innovation to support London's transition to the circular economy; and helping London become a net zero-carbon city by 2050.

The appointment of Goodwin was originally confirmed by a hearing of the GLA Confirmations Committee on 20 February 2017 and was reconfirmed by the same committee in August 2020.

In October 2024, Goodwin announced that she was stepping down as Chair of ReLondon, having completed two terms as Chair.

== Personal life ==
Goodwin is married and lives in Oxfordshire.
