= Joseph Mariano =

American flutist (1911-2007)

- Born: Born March 17, 1911; Pittsburgh, United States
- Died: February 15, 2007 (aged 95) Sudbury, Massachusetts
- Genres: Classical
- Occupations: Flutist, virtuoso, teacher
- Instrument: Flute

External audio
- You may hear Joseph Mariano and Howard Hanson's Eastman-Rochester Orchestra in Griffes' Poem for Flute and Orchestra in 1942 Here on Archive.org

Joseph Mariano, born as Giuseppe Antonio de Bartolomeo Mariano (March 17, 1911 in Pittsburgh – February 17, 2007 in Sudbury, Massachusetts, United States), was an American flutist. He studied with William Kincaid (flutist) at the Curtis Institute of Music, earning the Artists Degree in 1933. He was principal flute of the National Symphony Orchestra for the 1934-35 season. At the invitation of Howard Hanson, Mariano taught flute at the Eastman School of Music from 1935 to 1974 and served as principal flutist of the Rochester Philharmonic Orchestra from 1935 to 1968 under music directors José Iturbi, Erich Leinsdorf, Theodore Bloomfield, and László Somogyi. During his tenure, the RPO released many recordings, especially those with the Eastman-Rochester Symphony Orchestra (including faculty from Eastman) conducted by Howard Hanson. Mariano is the soloist in Hanson’s recording of the Poem for Flute and Orchestra by Charles Tomlinson Griffes, released first in 1954 and subsequently in five additional pressings. Despite invitations from Fritz Reiner to join the Chicago Symphony Orchestra and Arturo Toscanini to join the NBC Symphony, Mariano remained in Rochester for his entire career.

Mariano was one of the most influential flute teachers of his generation. His students included Shaul Ben-Meir of the Detroit Symphony Orchestra; Bonita Boyd, Mariano's successor as professor of flute at Eastman; Leone Buyse, former flutist in the Boston Symphony Orchestra; Doriot Anthony Dwyer, longtime principal flutist of the BSO; Janet Ferguson, flutist in the Los Angeles Philharmonic; Patricia George, flutist, teacher, and writer; Katherine Hoover, flutist and composer; Walfrid Kujala, solo piccolo of the Chicago Symphony Orchestra; Kujala’s son, jazz flutist Steven Kujala; Murray Panitz, principal flutist of the Philadelphia Orchestra; Fenwick Smith, second flutist of the BSO; and Robert Hugh Willoughby, professor of flute at the Oberlin Conservatory of Music, the Peabody Institute, and the Longy School of Music of Bard College.

The National Flute Association honored Mariano with its Lifetime Achievement Award in 2001 and released a CD of Mariano’s recordings in its Historic Recording Series in the same year.
