= Martin Amlin =

American composer (born 1953)

Martin Amlin (born June 12, 1953) is an American composer and pianist. He was born in Dallas, Texas.

He serves as the Mildred P. Gilfillan Professor of Music and Chair of the Department of Composition and Theory at the Boston University College of Fine Arts as well as Senior Director of the Boston University Tanglewood Institute Young Artists Composition Program.

== Career ==
Martin Amlin received Master of Music and Doctor of Musical Arts degrees and the Performer's Certificate from the Eastman School of Music at the University of Rochester. At Eastman he studied piano with Frank Glazer and composition with Joseph Schwantner, Samuel Adler, and Warren Benson. He studied with Nadia Boulanger at the Ecoles d'Art Américaines in Fontainebleau and at the Ecole Normale de Musique in Paris.

Amlin has been a resident at Yaddo, MacDowell, and the Virginia Center for the Creative Arts. He has performed as soloist with the Boston Pops Orchestra and has been a rehearsal pianist for the Boston Symphony Orchestra and the Tanglewood Festival Chorus. He has appeared on the FleetBoston Celebrity Series and with the M.I.T. Experimental Music Studio. He has recorded for the Albany, Ashmont Music, Centaur, Crystal, Hyperion, Koch International, MSR Classics, and Wergo labels, and his music is published by the Theodore Presser Company. Among his former students are Missy Mazzoli, Valerie Coleman, Lara Poe, and Thomas Weaver.

== Awards ==
- Grant to Young Composers (ASCAP)
- ASCAP Plus Awards (ASCAP)
- Kahn Award (Boston University)
- Grant from the Massachusetts Artists Foundation
- Grant from the Massachusetts Council for the Arts
- Grant from the Massachusetts Cultural Council
- National Endowment for the Arts Composer Fellowship
- Norlin Fellow (MacDowell)
- Grant from the St. Botolph Club Foundation
- Tanglewood Music Center Fellowships, four summers
- Newly published Music Competition winner (National Flute Association)

== Works ==
=== Orchestra ===
- Quatrains from the Rubáiyát for soprano and chamber orchestra (1977), 15 minutes
- Shadowdance for orchestra (1980), 10 minutes
- Concerto for Piccolo and Orchestra (1999), 20 minutes
- Three Songs of Nature for baritone, solo violin, and chamber orchestra (2008), 10 minutes
- Concerto for Flute/Piccolo and Orchestra (2012), 9 minutes
- In Memoriam C.D.H. for piccolo and string orchestra (2016), 4 minutes

=== Chamber ensemble ===
- Endless Ways for two pianos (1981), 12 minutes
- Sonata for Flute and Piano (1983), 15 minutes
- Morceau de Concours for flute and piano (1986), 3 minutes
- Sonata for Viola and Piano (1987), 12 minutes
- Atlantic Serenade for flute, clarinet, cello, and piano (1991), 10 minutes
- Trio Sonatina for flute, clarinet, and piano (1991), 12 minutes
- Variations for piano and woodwind quintet (1994), 12 minutes
- Prelude, Fugue, and Variations for piano and string quartet (1997), 12 minutes
- Sonata for Piccolo and Piano (1997), 20 minutes
- Sonatina Piccola for piccolo and piano (1999), 6 minutes
- Sonata for Clarinet and Piano (2001), 16 minutes
- Intrada for two flutes and piano (2002), 4 minutes
- Encomium for viola and harp (2004), 5 minutes
- Sonata No. 2 for Flute and Piano (2004), 15 minutes
- Moto Perpetuo for string quartet (2006)
- String Quartet (2009), 13 minutes
- Violetta for viola and piano (2010), 7 minutes
- Kennel for viola and piano (2011), 11 minutes
- Magic Maze for viola and piano (2017), 8 minutes
- Sonata for Trumpet and Piano (2017), 8 minutes
- Three Inventions for Five Flutes (doubling Piccolos) (2018), 9 minutes
- Vermont Harmony for viola and piano (2019), 5 minutes
- Intrada II for two trumpets and piano (2022), 5 minutes
- Intrada III for two bassoons and piano (2024), 4 minutes
- Lullaby for Two Violas (2025), 3 minutes
- Sistreningra Quartet for string quartet (2025), 15 minutes
- Trioson Redux for soprano saxophone, viola, and piano (2026), 10 minutes

=== Solo instrument ===
- Prelude: In Praise of the Infinity of Time for organ (1972), 9 minutes
- Piano Sonata No. 4 (1973), 17 minutes
- L'intrigue des Accords Oubliés for harp (1976), 5 minutes
- Piano Sonata No. 5 (1982), 20 minutes
- Piano Sonata No. 6 (1987), 10 minutes
- Five Preludes for piano (1995), 15 minutes
- Eight Variations for Piano (2000), 5 minutes
- Piano Sonata No. 7 (2000), 14 minutes
- Ephemeropterae I and II for solo piccolo (2004), 3 minutes
- Three Alphabetudes for piano (2005), 10 minutes
- Fusion Etude for piano (2013), 4 minutes
- Solfeggietto Redux for piano (2014), 3 minutes
- Quatrain for piano (2015), 2 minutes
- Eight Etudes on Intervals for piano (2016), 25 minutes
- Piano Sonata No. 8 (2021), 13 minutes
- Ephemeroptera Redux for solo viola (2025) 3 minutes

=== Vocal music ===
- The Three Marias for soprano and piano (1980)
- Israfel for soprano, flute, violin, cello, and piano (1980), 5 minutes
- Lullaby for tenor and piano (1982), 3 minutes
- Passions of Singleness for mezzo-soprano, viola, vibraphone, and harp (1983), 13 minutes
- Four Songs on Texts of Anonymous Poets for soprano and piano (1984), 13 minutes
- A Lasting Spring for soprano and piano (1985), 12 minutes
- Seven Songs for mezzo-soprano and piano (1988), 10 minutes
- Time's Caravan for mixed chorus and double string quintet (1989), 12 minutes
- The Heavenly Feast for soprano and piano (1993), 8 minutes
- The House of Falling Leaves for soprano and piano (1994), 3 minutes
- Two Songs On Poems by Anne Fessenden for soprano, alto flute, and piano (2006), 6 minutes
- Evening Meditation in a Cathedral Town for mezzo-soprano and piano (2000)
- Three Madrigals for mixed chorus and two pianos (2002), 10 minutes
- If You Should Go for mezzo-soprano and piano (2020), 2 minutes
- Now and Then for mezzo-soprano and piano (2020), 2 minutes
- Three Songs on Poems by Charles Pratt for mezzo-soprano, viola, and piano (2023), 6 minutes

== Discography of recordings of his compositions ==
- American Vistas, Albany Records
- The Sky's the Limit: A Celebration of 20th Century American Music for Flute, Crystal Records
- In Shadow, Light, Crystal Records
- About Time: 20th Century Vocal Music, Centaur Records
- 20th Century Choral Music, Koch International Records
- Andrew Willis Plays American Piano Music, Albany Records
- An American Menagerie, MSR Classics
- Music for Flute, Clarinet, and Piano, Albany Records

== Discography of his recordings of works by other composers ==
- Serenade: Music of John Heiss, Albany Records
- Chocolates: Music for Viola and Piano by James Grant, MSR Classics
- Dedicated to Barrère, Crystal Records
- Dedicated to Barrère, Vol. 2, Crystal Records
- Boston Symphony's Wayne Rapier Plays Oboe, Boston Records
- Brahms: Sonatas, Op. 120; Schumann: Märchenbilder, Op. 113, Ashmont Music
- Charles Koechlin: Music for Flute, Hyperion Records
- Elliott Carter: Choral Music, Koch International Records
- New Computer Music, Wergo Records
- Schubert: "Arpeggione" Sonata; Beethoven: Romances Op. 40 & 50, Notturno, Op. 42, Ashmont Music
- Vocal Chamber Music: Brahms, Schumann, Massenet, and Boulanger, Titanic Records
