= Walfrid Kujala =

American flutist (1925–2024)

Walfrid Kujala (February 19, 1925 – November 10, 2024) was an American flutist, piccolo player, teacher, and writer.

He was born in Warren, Ohio on February 19, 1925. In high school, he studied with Parker Taylor and played second flute to Taylor in the Huntington Symphony Orchestra, then studied with Joseph Mariano at the Eastman School of Music. He played second flute and piccolo with Mariano in the Rochester Philharmonic Orchestra from 1948 until 1952.

Kujala was assistant principal flute in the Chicago Symphony Orchestra from 1954 until 1957 and then piccolo in the orchestra from 1957 until 2001. He also was principal flute in the Grant Park Symphony Orchestra from 1955 until 1960. In the Chicago Symphony, he played under four music directors: Fritz Reiner, Jean Martinon, Georg Solti, and Daniel Barenboim. He appeared as soloist with the orchestra on at least nine programs, often performing the piccolo concertos by Vivaldi. For instance, Claudia Cassidy wrote in The Chicago Tribune, "Five of the Chicago Symphony Orchestra's front desk men were Fritz Reiner's soloists Saturday night in an engaging performance in Orchestra Hall. Most surprising of the virtuosi was Walfrid Kujala, a tall man with a tiny instrument, who explained by playing one of them why Vivaldi wrote three concertos for the piccolo, or little flute. It was a model of classicism warmed by Venetian charm."

One hundred fifty of Kujala's students commissioned Gunther Schuller to compose his Flute Concerto to honor Kujala's sixtieth birthday, and Kujala played the world premiere with Georg Solti conducting the Chicago Symphony Orchestra on October 13, 1988. John von Rhein wrote, "If one responds most readily to the haunted, glissandi-rich slow movement and to Schuller`s witty finale for flute and piccolo, this is not to deny the effectiveness of the piece as a whole, or the virtuosity with which Kujala and Solti realized it."

Walfrid Kujala taught hundreds of students at Northwestern University from 1962 until 2012 and wrote dozens of articles for The Instrumentalist magazine, Flute Talk, and The Flutist Quarterly. In 1970, he founded Progress Press, which distributed his publications.

Kujala served as the founding secretary and later president of The National Flute Association. The National Flute Association honored Kujala with its Lifetime Achievement Award in 1997.

Walfrid Kujala died on November 10, 2024, at the age of 99.

== Publications ==
- The Flutist's Progress, Progress Press, 1970.
- Orchestral Techniques for Flute and Piccolo: An Audition Guide, Progress Press, 1992 ISBN 978-0-9789116-0-7.
- The Flutist's Vade Mecum of Scales, Arpeggios, Trills and Fingering Technique, Progress Press, first edition, 1995, second edition, 2012 ISBN 978-1-4675-1736-2.
- The Articulate Flutist, Progress Press, 2009.

== Articles ==
- "24 Practical Exercises for Flute," Flute Talk (October 1987).
- "Advice for Future College Flutists," Flute Talk (November 1991), 28.
- "Beethoven, Leonore Overture No. 3: Audition Hints," Emerson Flute Forum (Spring/Summer 1992).
- "The Benefits of Inflation," Flute Talk (October 1994), 28–29, Flute Talk (May 1985), 25- 27, and The Instrumentalist (February 1973).
- "A Brief History of Flute Design," The Instrumentalist (November 1972).
- "Corrections and Clarifications ('Mistakes Were Made'), FQ Plus (September 2, 2014)
- "Embellishment Italian Style," Flute Talk (October 1988), 12–14; originally in The Instrumentalist (December 1976).
- "The 5 W's of the Major Scale," The Instrumentalist.
- "Flute Fingerings, In Homage to Henri Altès," Flute Talk (March 1992), 8–13; originally in The Instrumentalist (November 1981).
- "Flutists' Common Mistakes," Flute Talk (October 1993), 27–28.
- "Fresh Ideas for Mozart Cadenzas," Flute Talk (December 1995), 12–15, musical example corrected in Flute Talk (January 1996), 31.
- "A Guide to Trill Choices in the Mozart G Major Concerto," The Flutist's Handbook: A Pedagogy Anthology (National Flute Association, 1998).
- "I Have a Flute Dream! (to wit: A Smart Flute With Apps!)," FQ Plus (March 5, 2012),FQ Plus (September 2, 2014)
- "Into the Jaws of Inflation," Flute Talk (October 1994), 10–12.
- "I've Got Hungarian Rhythm," The Flutist Quarterly 41, no. 1 (Fall 2025), 20–24.
- "Jawboning and the Flute Embouchure," The Instrumentalist (Fall 1971), reprinted in Flute Talk (May/June, September, and October 1987).
- "The Kincaid Legacy," The Instrumentalist (November 1974).
- "The Kujalas on Eurhythmionics," Flute Talk XXI/4 (December 2001).
- "Learning from the Violins," Flute Talk XX/4 (December 2000).
- contributor to "Joseph Mariano: The Man, the Artist, the Teacher," The Flutist Quarterly X/4 (Summer 1985), 4-23.
- "A More Flexible Approach to Using Auxiliary Keys," in Selected Flute Masterclasses (Malibu, CA: Windplayer Publications, 1998), 30–31.
- "Mostly Meliorated Mozart," The Flutist Quarterly 22, no. 2 (Winter 1996/97), 26–30.
- "The Murray Flute," The Instrumentalist (November 1972).
- "Music, Growth, and Change: The Beginnings of the NFA," The Flutist Quarterly 23, no. 2 (Winter 1998), 17–20.
- "New Books and Records for Flutists," The Instrumentalist (June 1974).
- "A New Perspective on Note Releases," Flute Talk (April 1995).
- "New Solo and Study Materials for Flute," The Instrumentalist (February 1978).
- "A Performance Checklist for Debussy's Syrinx," The Instrumentalist (February 1976), reprinted in Flute Talk (February 2020).
- "Performing Ravel's Daphnis et Chlöe," Flute Talk (October 1991), 28–29.
- "Piccolo Mobilo," The Flutist Quarterly XIV/2 (Spring 1989), 58–61.
- "Reminiscing With Ernest Liegl," The Flutist Quarterly XII/1 (Winter 1987), 31–37.
- "Shifting the Beat for a Cleaner Technique," Flute Talk XIX/8 (April 2000) and The Instrumentalist (April 1974).
- "Stress or Strain Forever," Flute Talk (February 1992), 32.
- "Syrinx Gone Wild," Flute Talk (October 2014).
- "Take your Pick: Winds of Change," Flute Talk (November 1994), 18–21.
- "Thumbs Up for Altès and Briccialdi," Flute Talk (January 1993), 18–24.
- "Tone Development Through Sostenuto-Legato Orchestral Passages," Yamaha Flute Sounds 2, 3.

== Recordings ==
- Vivaldi, Piccolo Concerto in C Major, RV 443, Walfrid Kujala, solo piccolo; Antonio Janigro, conductor; Chicago Symphony Orchestra (live recording from June 9, 1966), Soloists of the Orchestra, Vol 3,
