= Warren Benson =

American composer (1924–2005)

Warren Frank Benson (January 26, 1924 – October 6, 2005) was an American composer. His compositions consist mostly of music for wind instruments and percussion. His most notable piece is titled The Leaves Are Falling (1964).

== Biography ==
Benson was born in Detroit in 1924, and was a graduate of Cass Technical High School. He was a professional performer by the age of 14, when he played timpani in the Detroit Symphony Orchestra under Ormandy, Reiner, Goossens, Bernstein, and others while an undergraduate at the University of Michigan. From 1950 to 1952, Benson was awarded two successive Fulbright grants to teach at Anatolia College in Salonika, Greece. There he established a five-year bilingual music curriculum and organized the Anatolia College Chorale, the first scholastic co-educational choral group in that country. After 14 years at Ithaca College (where, in 1953, he organized the first touring percussion ensemble in the eastern United States – and the second worldwide), Benson became professor of composition at the Eastman School of Music. During his tenure there (1967–1993), he was honored with an Alumni Citation for Excellence, the Kilbourn professorship for distinguished teaching, and was named University Mentor. In 1994 he was appointed professor emeritus. He also served as distinguished visiting professor at Southern Methodist University from 1986 to 1988.

Benson composed over 100 musical works. He is known for his moving song cycles and dynamic works for percussion and winds. The Leaves are Falling, composed following the assassination of John F Kennedy, became a staple of the band repertoire. It was included in Donald Hunsberger's list of essential works for wind ensemble. His music has been performed in more than 40 countries, and frequently recorded. Benson received numerous awards for his music, including a 1981 Guggenheim Composer Fellowship, the Lillian Fairchild Award, a Citation of Excellence from the National Band Association, many ASCAP Serious Music Awards, and three National Endowment for the Arts composer commissions.

He was a founding member of the Percussive Arts Society, and was elected to its Hall of Fame, as well as to the National Band Association Academy of Excellence. In addition to his published music, Benson wrote "Creative Projects in Musicianship", poetry and humorous fiction. In 1999, he celebrated his 75th birthday with the publication of "…And My Daddy Will Play the Drums: Limericks for Friends of Drummers".

== Legacy ==
Benson's notable students include Kevin Puts, Carter Pann, Michael Glenn Williams, Eric Ewazen, Claude Baker, Robert Paterson, Gordon Stout, John Joseph Davye, Paul Phillips, Roger Briggs, Martin Amlin, Paul Mack Somers, and Michael Udow. See: List of music students by teacher: A to B#Warren Benson.

He is the subject of a bio-bibliography by Alan Wagner, published by Edwin Mellen Press.

== Works ==
=== Solo ===
- Three Macedonian Miniatures, for solo piano
- If I Could Be?, for solo piano
- Not Without Merritt, for solo piano
- Three Dances for Solo Snare Drum, for solo snare drum

=== Chamber ensemble ===
- Canon, for tuba and hand drum
- Capriccio, for violin, viola, cello, and piano
- Concertino, for alto saxophone and wind ensemble (1971)
- The Dream Net, for alto saxophone and string quartet (1983)
- A Gentle Song, for B-flat clarinet and piano (1953)
- Invocation and Dance
- Largo Tah
- Quartet One, for string quartet
- Quintet, for oboe and string quartet
- Steps
- String Quartet No. 1
- Wind Rose, for saxophone quartet

=== Vocal/choral ===
- The Drums of Summer, for small wind ensemble (27 players) and SATB chamber choir (16 singers)
- An Englishman with an Atlas or America the Unpronounceable, for a cappella SAB chorus (1976)
- Five Lyrics Of Luise Bogan, for mezzo-soprano and flute (1984)
- Nara
- Psalm 24
- Psalm 139: "Whither Can I Go from Your Spirit?", for SATB chorus and keyboard (1981)
- Sing and Rejoice, for a cappella SSAATTBB chorus (1997)
- The Singers and The Cherry Tree, for a cappella SATB chorus (1999)
- Song of the Pop-Bottlers, for three-part treble a cappella chorus (1970)
- Songs for the End of the World
- Three Solitary Songs, for medium voice and piano

=== Band ===
- Adagietto
- Danzon-Memory
- Dawn's Early Light
- Divertissement
- Ginger Marmalade (1978)
- Grainger and Friends
- The Leaves Are Falling (1964)
- The Mask of Night
- Night Song (1959)
- Passing Bell (1974)
- Polyphonies for Percussion
- Remembrance
- Shadow Wood
- The Solitary Dancer
- Symphony No. 2 ("Lost Songs")
- Vigor
- Wings

=== Band with soloist(s) ===
- Aeolian Song, for alto saxophone and band (version for piano and alto sax also available)
- Concertino for Alto Saxophone and Band
- Helix, for solo tuba and concert band
- Recuerdo, for oboe/English horn (one player) and band
- Star Edge, for alto saxophone and wind ensemble

=== Orchestra ===
- Beyond Winter: Sweet Aftershowers
- The Man with the Blue Guitar
- Polyphonies

=== Orchestra with soloist(s) ===
- Aeolian Song, for alto saxophone and small orchestra
- Concertino for Alto Saxophone
- Concertino for Flute, Strings and Percussion

== Archive ==
A Warren Benson Archive is in the process of being established at the Sibley Music Library, and the Benson family will endow the creation of the Warren and Pat Benson Forum on Creativity.
