= Sinfonia concertante =

Type of musical composition

A sinfonia concertante (IPA: [siɱfoˈniːa kontʃerˈtante]; also called symphonie concertante) is an orchestral work, normally in several movements, in which one or more solo instruments contrast with the full orchestra. It emerged as a musical form during the Classical period of Western music from the Baroque concerto grosso. Sinfonia concertante encompasses the symphony and the concerto genres, a concerto in that soloists are on prominent display, and a symphony in that the soloists are nonetheless discernibly a part of the total ensemble and not preeminent. Sinfonia concertante is the ancestor of the double and triple concerti of the Romantic period corresponding approximately to the 19th century.

== Classical era ==
In the Baroque period, the differences between a concerto and a sinfonia (also "symphony") were initially not all that clear. The word sinfonia would, for example, be used as the name for an overture to a stage work. Antonio Vivaldi wrote "concertos" which did not highlight individual soloists and which were stylistically more or less indistinguishable from his "sinfonias." The Baroque genre that comes closest to the Classical sinfonia concertante is the concerto grosso; among the most famous of these are those by Arcangelo Corelli and George Frideric Handel.

During the Classical period (roughly 1750–1800), both the symphony and the concerto had acquired more definite meanings, and the concerto grosso had disappeared altogether. In the second half of the 18th century, this led to attempts to combine the two genres, such as those by composers of the Mannheim school. Johann Christian Bach (the so-called "London Bach" and youngest son of Johann Sebastian) was publishing symphonies concertantes in Paris from the early 1770s on, as was Joseph Bologne, the 'famous Chevalier de Saint-Georges'. Mozart, who likely heard the early Sinfonia concertantes of Bologne, was also acquainted with the Mannheim school from 1777 and probably aware of J.C. Bach's publications. He put considerable effort into attempts to produce convincing sinfonie concertanti. His most successful are the following:

- Sinfonia Concertante for Violin, Viola and Orchestra K. 364 (the only one Mozart is actually considered to have finished that exists in an authentic copy).
- Sinfonia Concertante for Oboe, Clarinet, Horn, Bassoon and Orchestra K. 297b (known from an arrangement, possibly inauthentic).

Joseph Haydn also wrote a Sinfonia Concertante for Violin, Cello, Oboe and Bassoon during his visit to London, as a friendly challenge to his former student Ignaz Pleyel. He also stayed in London at the time and his works in the genre were highly popular. Haydn also wrote symphonies with long soloist parts, especially early in his career, such as the "Time of Day" symphonies 6–8. These are, however, rightfully considered symphonies rather than sinfonie concertanti. Other examples from the era are Kozeluch's Sinfonia Concertante in E♭ major for mandolin, trumpet, double-bass, piano, Gossec's Symphonie Concertante for Violin and Cello in D major and Gresnick's Symphonie Concertante in B♭ major for Clarinet and Bassoon.

== Romantic era ==
Few composers still called their compositions sinfonia concertante after the classical music era. However, some works such as Berlioz's Harold en Italie, for viola and orchestra approach the genre.

Ludwig van Beethoven did not write anything designated as a sinfonia concertante, although some feel his Triple Concerto qualifies for inclusion in the genre.

Felix Mendelssohn wrote two concertos for two pianos and orchestra: one in E major and one in A♭ major, which can both be seen as sinfonie concertanti.

Saint-Saëns' Symphony No. 3 features an organ that is partially immersed in the orchestral sound, but also has several distinct solo passages. The second half of this work also features a semi-soloistic part for piano four hands.

By the end of the 19th century, several French composers had started using the sinfonia concertante technique in symphonic poems, for example, Saint-Saëns uses a violin in Danse macabre, and Franck a piano in Les Djinns.

Richard Strauss's Don Quixote (1897) uses several soloists to depict the main characters, namely cello, viola, bass clarinet and tenor tuba.

Lalo's best known work, the Symphonie espagnole, is in fact a sinfonia concertante for violin and orchestra.

A work in the same vein, but with the piano taking the "concertante" part is d'Indy's Symphony on a French Mountain Air.

Brahms's concerto for violin, cello and orchestra in a minor, Op. 102, the last of his four concertos, is effectively a sinfonia concertante.

Bruch explored the boundaries of the solistic and symphonic genres in the Scottish Fantasy (violin soloist), Kol Nidrei (cello soloist), and Serenade (violin soloist). He also wrote a concerto for clarinet, viola and orchestra in E minor, and a concerto for two pianos and orchestra in A♭ minor, which are both equal to a sinfonia concertante.

Ferruccio Busoni wrote an enormous piano concerto in C major, containing five movements, lasting over an hour and even finishing with a male choir, that can be considered a sinfonia concertante.

== 20th century ==
In the 20th century, some composers such as George Enescu, Darius Milhaud, Frank Martin, Edmund Rubbra, Florent Schmitt, William Walton and Malcolm Williamson again used the name sinfonia concertante for their compositions. Martin's work, more reminiscent of the classical works with multiple soloists, features a piano, a harpsichord, and a harp. Karol Szymanowski also composed a sinfonia concertante (for solo piano and orchestra), also known as his Symphony No. 4 "Symphonie-Concertante." Other examples include Joseph Jongen's 1926 Symphonie Concertante, Op. 81, with an organ soloist, the Sinfonia Concertante (Symphony No. 4), for flute, harp and small string orchestra by Andrzej Panufnik written in 1973, and Peter Maxwell Davies's Sinfonia Concertante for wind quintet, timpani and string orchestra of 1982.

The Czech composer Bohuslav Martinů wrote two works in this genre: Sinfonia Concertante for Two Orchestras, H. 219 (1932) and Sinfonia Concertante No. 2 in B♭ major for Violin, Cello, Oboe, Bassoon and Orchestra with Piano, H. 322 (1949). In fact, all but one of the composer's symphonies feature a piano, as do most of his orchestral works, but the two afore-mentioned works were the only two in his output which he labelled concertante symphonies.

Wilhelm Furtwängler completed in 1937 his Symphonic Concerto for Piano and Orchestra in B minor, which lasts over one hour and is one of the longest piano concertos ever written.

Sergei Prokofiev called his work for cello and orchestra Symphony-Concerto, stressing its serious symphonic character, in contrast to the light character of the Classical period sinfonia concertante. Benjamin Britten's Cello Symphony and Ellen Taaffe Zwilich's Symphony No. 2 also showcase a solo cello within the context of a full-scale symphony.

Peter Schickele as P. D. Q. Bach produced a spoof "Sinfonia Concertante" utilizing lute, balalaika, double reed slide music stand, ocarina, left-handed sewer flute, and bagpipes.

== See also ==
- Concerto for Orchestra

== Notes ==
1. For example, in the explanatory notes from the booklet to the CD "BEETHOVEN – Triple Concerto/Choral Fantasia" (Capriccio Classic Productions No. 180240, 1988).

== Sources ==
- Encyclopædia Britannica
- Collins: Encyclopedia of Music, William Collins Sons & Company Ltd., 1976 ISBN 000434331X
