= William McColl (clarinetist) =

American clarinetist (1933–2024)

William Duncan McColl (May 18, 1933 – January 7, 2024) was an American clarinetist and professor of music.

== Biography ==
Mozart's Clarinet Quintet – 2. Adagio
Live performance of the second movement of Mozart's Clarinet Quintet with the Philadelphia String Quartet

McColl was born on May 18, 1933, in Port Huron, Michigan, to Duncan and Margaret McColl. He began playing clarinet at the age of twelve. He later attended National Music Camp at the Interlochen Center for the Arts.

McColl then attended the Oberlin Conservatory of Music (1951–1953) and graduated with honors from the Akademie für Musik und darstellende Kunst in Vienna under Leopold Wlach. His primary teachers in the United States included Keith Stein, George Waln and Herbert Blayman. In 1956 he was drafted under the Military Selective Service Act and became a member of the Seventh Army Symphony Orchestra from 1957 to 1958; he was also part of the Seventh Army Wind quintet. After leaving the army he joined Philharmonia Hungarica in Vienna, before moving to New York in 1959 where he worked as a freelance clarinetist and appeared on the Modern Jazz Quartet album Third Stream Music.

In 1960 he moved to Puerto Rico, where he taught clarinet at the Conservatory of Music of Puerto Rico. The Soni Ventorum Wind Quintet was also founded there. He was a featured performer at the Casals Festival in Puerto Rico. He met his wife, Sue, who was then a bassoonist, in Puerto Rico, where his son was born. In 1968 he moved to Seattle with the other members of the Soni Ventorum Wind Quintet, which had become the Wind Quintet in Residence of the University of Washington, where he was a professor from 1968 to 2006.

As a specialist in early clarinets and basset horns, he did international tours, recordings and concert appearances with the Amadeus Winds, the Philharmonia Baroque Orchestra, and the Boston Handel and Haydn Society, among others.

McColl was also a founding member of the New World Basset Horn Trio. He recorded solo and chamber works on Musical Heritage, and Crystal labels (with the Soni Ventorum), as well as on the Atlantic, Decca and Harmonia Mundi labels.

McColl was heralded as a "superb clarinetist", "graceful" and "virtuosic and full of life".

McColl died due to respiratory failure in Seattle, on January 7, 2024, at the age of 90.
