= Fenwick Smith =

American flutist (1949–2017)

Fenwick Smith (1949 – July 19, 2017) was an American flutist. He studied under Joseph Mariano at the Eastman School of Music, graduating from there in 1972. Shortly thereafter he became a member of the New England Woodwind Quintet and began a thirteen-year membership with Boston Musica Viva. He became the assistant principal flutist of the Boston Symphony Orchestra in 1978, serving in that position until September 2006. During this time he was also principal flutist of the Boston Pops Orchestra. Smith was also a member of the Boston Chamber Music Society since 1984, and since 1983 gave annual recitals at Jordan Hall.

Smith had a reputation for playing new works and has notably made numerous premiere recordings of works by composers like Copland, Foote, Gaubert, Ginastera, Koechlin, Dahl, Harbison, Cage, Pinkham, Erwin Schulhoff, Schoenberg, Ned Rorem, and Reinecke.

== Recordings ==
- Schulhoff & Schoenberg - Chamber Works: Schoenberg: Sonata after the Wind Quintet, Op. 26, Schulhoff: Sonata for Flute and Piano, Concertino for flute, viola & double bass. Fenwick Smith (flute) & Randall Hodkinson (piano) (Chandos CHAN10515)
- Reinecke - From the Cradle to the Grave : Reinecke: Octet for Flute, Oboe, 2 Clarinets, 2 Horns and 2 Bassoons, Op. 216, Von der Wiege bis zum Grabe, Op. 202, Sextet in B flat major, Op. 271. Fenwick Smith (flute), Keisuke Wakao (oboe), Thomas Martin (clarinet), Craig Nordstrom (clarinet), Jonathan Menkis (horn), Daniel Katzen (horn), Richard Ranti (bassoon), Roland Small (bassoon) & Hugh Hinton (piano) Members of the Boston Symphony Orchestra (Naxos 8570777)
- Gaubert - Works for flute : 2 CD collection with the whole music for flute from Philippe Gaubert. Sally Pinkas, Andrew Pearce (cello), Jacques Zoon, Jayne West, Anne Hobson Pilot, Malcolm Lowe (Naxos, 2004)
