= Conservatory of Music of Puerto Rico =

Public conservatory in San Juan, Puerto Rico

Coordinates: 18°27′15″N 66°04′46″W

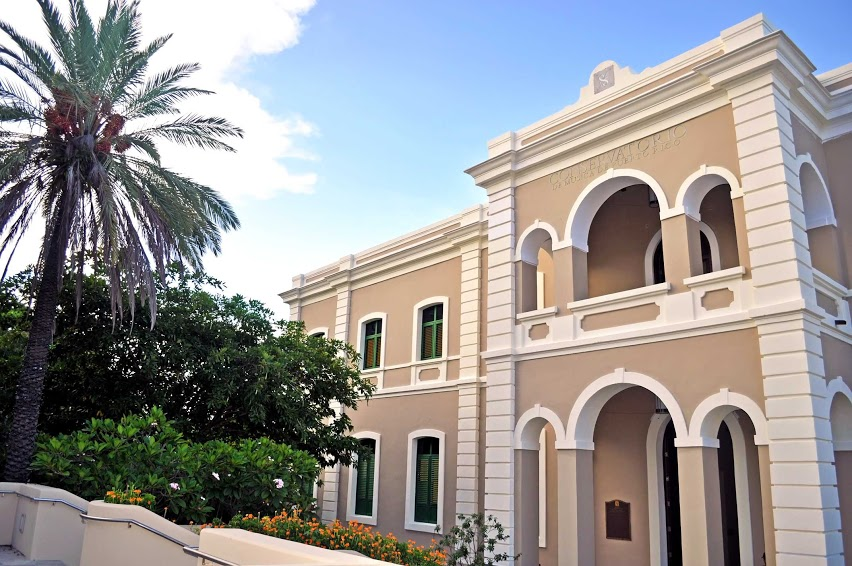
- Façade of the historic building of the Conservatory
- Type: Public conservatory
- Established: June 12, 1959; 67 years ago
- Principal: Manuel Calzada Delgado
- Students: 520 (2016)
- Location: San Juan, Puerto Rico
- Former Colegio de las Madres del Sagrado Corazon
- U.S. National Register of Historic Places
- Puerto Rico Historic Sites and Zones
- NRHP reference No.: 85002908
- Designated: November 21, 1985

The Puerto Rico Conservatory of Music (Spanish: Conservatorio de Música de Puerto Rico) is a public conservatory in San Juan, Puerto Rico. It has hosted a number of international musicians as students as well as faculty, and has a longstanding relationship with the classical music movement in Puerto Rico, including the annual Casals Festival and the Puerto Rico Symphony Orchestra (PRSO). Following the success of the Casals Festival held in San Juan in 1957, state legislator Ernesto Ramos Antonini proposed several laws which would create the Puerto Rico Symphony Orchestra that same year, and the Conservatory of Music in June 1959.

The conservatory was originally envisioned as a school for preparing musicians for the PRSO and for preparing music teachers for the state public education system. Throughout the years, however, the conservatory has become a musical landmark in the Caribbean, providing advanced academic studies in various music areas to local students as well as international visitors. Since its inception, the conservatory has been under the administration of state government agencies, including the Puerto Rico Industrial Development Company (Compañía de Fomento Económico), the Administration for the Encouragement of Arts and Culture (Administración para el Fomento de las Artes y Cultura), and the Musical Arts Corporation (Corporación de las Artes Musicales, or CAM). Collectively, all three were called "The Organization" by the administration.

It remained a part of the CAM until 1995 when a state law granted it fiscal and administrative autonomy. Since then, the conservatory has been autonomously run by a board of trustees appointed by the Governor and confirmed by the Senate. Among the artists that took classes at the Conservatorio included Luis "Perico" Ortiz, Elías Lopés, Melvin Sotomayor, Miguel Peña, Andrés Ortiz, Pedro Rodríguez Saniel, Carlos Martínez, Tito Lara, Eddie Feijó, Obed Tirado, Julio Martínez, Miguel Ángel López Duchesne.

== History ==
=== Early proposals ===
Efforts to create a music conservatorium at Puerto Rico date as far back as the 1890s. On December 12, 1955, Pablo Casals attended a diner at La Fortaleza, in which a conversation between him, Muñoz Marín and Teodoro Moscoso led to the mention of the Prades Festival and the governor asking the latter to organize a similar initiative. Moscoso contacted the head of Fomento, who agreed to work on the initiative and Alexander Schneider was brought in at the request of Casals. Through Internal Resolution 740 Fomento created Festival Casals Inc. and the first Festival was held in 1957. The board was led by Passalacqua and included Abe Fortas, Miguel Garriga, Antonio Fernández Castrillón, José Trías Monge, Juan Enrique Géigel, Rafael Benítez and Esteban Bird; Casals himself was musical director and Schneider was his auxiliary director. The University of Puerto Rico (UPR) was not considered to administrate these events, with the governor and Jaime Benítez already at odds. In February 1956, Schneider, Casals and his student Marta Montañez held a reunion with Muñoz, First Lady Inés Mendoza and Moscoso, where the organization of the first orquesta was requested. Another was held the following month, with Casals, Montañez, Muñoz, Mendoza, Moscoso, Rafael Benítez Carle, Tomás Blanco, Jack Delano and Alfredo Matilla where broader topics were discussed.

On May 8, 1957, the first Casals Festival was held at the UPR. Schneider was in charge of assembling the orchestra, a process in which he admittedly "narrowed the selections down to the small complement of chamber musicians [...] who to me represent the height of ability, wide experience, and the tenuous battle of intellectual curiosity and artistic representation". On May 29, 1957, Inés Mendoza proposed to Abe Fortas restoring the Spanish forts at Old San Juan so that they could be repurposed for academic musical enterprises. On September 19, 1958, a meeting on the festival was hosted at La Fortaleza, with Trias Monge and Fortas among the participants. Tough no advances were immediately evident from these efforts, the public exposition of music progressed and the Orquesta Sinfónica de Puerto Rico debuted on November 5, 1958.

On July 24, 1961, Schneider wrote to Muñoz arguing that there should be an emphasis in training "children and young people" (starting at the age of 10), as part of a "complete plan for the musical education" emphasizing strings that he expected to produce results in "ten or fifteen years" leading to a "Puerto Rico Symphony Orquesta" (an Orquesta where all members were Puerto Rican). On February 28, 1962, Schneider wrote to Castro about the symphonic orchestra, arguing that there was a need for string players.

Fundación Casals Inc. was first registered as a for profit corporation on April 20, 1956, with Fomento acquiring its shares (priced at $100). In 1962, Ricardo Alegría joined the board. Following the creation of the Institute of Puerto Rican Culture (ICP), he created a commission (members included president Augusto Rodríguez, Héctor Campos Parsi, Roger Martínez, Carmelina Figueroa, Monsita Ferrer and Jesús María Sanromá) that lead to drafting the law that created the Conservatorio. However, the arrival of Pablo Casals to Puerto Rico modified these plans and placed the establishment in a hiatus. Fomento Industrial would create Corporación Festival Casals, Inc. as a subsidiary, with offices in New York. The president of the CDF also presided the board of the entity, composed by residents of San Juan, and governor Muñiz would authorize the program.

Among the members of this board, Abe Fortas had notable control over the administration of the corporation and the estate of the Casals family. Schneider was named as assistant director at the behest of Casals. However, he would not hold auditions to fill the spaces in the Orquesta Sinfónica, instead relying on his personal preferences. Frictions emerged after foreign musicians were featured in the prominent roles of the inaugural 1957 Casals Festival, excluding the locals. Muñoz Marín himself referred to these impromptu assembly of foreigners as the "flying orquesta". In 1958, the corporation was granted control of the Orquesta Sinfónica de Puerto Rico.

=== Foundation and first classes ===
Fundación Casals Inc. also received administration of the conservatorium, which was formally established by Law 35 of July 12, 1959. Its financing was secured by Ley Núm. 5959, which authorized Festival Casals Inc. to request up to $100,000 for 1960-61 and to give way to studies that would allow the creation and functioning of the organization. It also allowed the entity to receive donations from the public. Law No. 35 also noted that the Conservatorios Dean of studies would also participate in the Sinfónica and collaborate with Festival Casals. Being based in New York, the corporation would generally recruit foreign musicians for both entities, with Schneider authorizing who would serve as professor in the Conservatorio. The creation of the Casals Festival would result in the recruitment of Antonio Fernández Castrillón to its board by the governor, a move that was detrimental to other initiatives linked to him, such as the organization of opera festivals in the UPR and other initiatives related to, or dependent on, Pro Arte Musical.

In June 1959, plans to create the "Commonwealth Music Center" were unveiled, with Roberto Sanchez Vilella assigning $30,000 for the umbrella that would house the Conservatorio, Orquesta Sinfónica and the Escuela Libre de Música. Following that year's Festival Casals, Carlos Passalaqua held a reunion with Alexander Schneider on the topic of a Latin American director for the event and the conservatorium, leading to the recommendation of Juan José Castro, who received a two-year contract. After arriving to Puerto Rico, he also took over the Orquesta Sinfónica. His work, however, was under overseer Casals. The Dean was contractually obligated to lead a class of string ensemble or an institutional orchestra.

The Conservatorio began operations on January 25, 1960, with Castro as Dean of Studies a lack of knowledge of the local musical history. The inauguration ceremony was attended by several politicians, including the governor, and featured speeches by Casals and Castro. Initially the curriculum was limited, while the institution operated under Fomento at a building found at Calle Rafael Lamar. José Gueits was dean of administration. Rubén Cardona was the administrative official. Several foreign musicians that joined the Orquesta Sinfónica would also serve as professors and these instrumentalists were not required to audition . Gueits' involvement allowed a collaboration between the entity and the UPR, which granted the incipient entity a space to practice, provide housing and hold concerts, which later included a collaboration to build an acoustic shell. He brokered a dispense with Sebastián González for members of the UPR's Fine Arts Department to join the Conservatorio.

Jesús María Sanromá led the Piano Department, which had María Luisa Muñoz, Elías López Sobá, Nydia Font and Narciso Figueroa as professors. The Theory and Composition Department was in charge of Julián Bautista (recommended by Castro) and featured María Rodrigo, Roger Martínez and Héctor Campos Parsi. William McColl took over as clarinet professor, taking over after a brief tenure by Martínez. The Music History Department was led by Alfredo Matilla. The Singing Department was headed by Ángeles Otein and later Augusto Rodríguez (who had worked with the UPR chorus and taken it abroad and brought with him over 33 pieces, several of them original) and Nilda González joined. The Cords Department was led by José Figueroa and featured Marta Casals as professor. The role of the chorus as backdrop to soloist presentations and a prevalence of activities that were of extracurricular nature, such as opera companies, led to student resistance to Rainis and Matilla.

Ángeles Nieto was recruited after Castro was impressed by Pilar Lorenza "Lorengar" García's singing, inquiring who was her teacher. Howard Hillyer was also contracted as French horn professor in 1962, but never joined and was replaced by Christopher Leuba, who took two contracts between 2962 and 1963. Several members of the Orquesta Panamericana joined the Conservatorio, namely Jesús Peña, Gildo Rodríguez, Héctor Urdaneta, Jorge Camacho, Germán Peña, Carlos Martínez, Leslie López, José María Henríquez, Lito Peña, Eladio "Yayo el Indio" Peguero, Miguel Peña. Of them, Jesús Peña, Leslie López and Germán Peña graduated. Other students included Olga Iglesias, Pablo Elvira, Camelia Ortiz del Rivero, Esteban Moreno and Luisa Rodríguez, of which only the former graduated.

The first class imparted at the Conservatorio was Sol-Fa and Theory, by Campos Parsi. During this time, the official enrollment was 124 students. The students frequently dropped out before graduating, others failed. By 1960, the total neared 200. That year, Jack Holland joined as professors and students joined to play trumpet, French horn and trombone under him (including Eusebio Valencia, Orlando Cora, Miguel Miranda and Nilda Pérez). During the summer, Carnelina Figueroa joined the Department of Theory and Composition. Roger Martínez worked as a professor of Theory and Sol-Fa until he was given the direction of the UPR's music department. Oboist Harry Schulman was replaced by James Cadwell.

In 1961, Felix Skowronek and Harry Schulman joined the Conservatorio and taught flute and oboe. However, Schneider felt that he "did not fit in with the other professors" and communicated so to Castro, and the latter's tenure lasted only three months. Likewise, Schneider also noted that he did "not like [Skowronek's] playing at all" and recommended using him as a third wind of the Orquesta and assigned him to the piccolo. He would also comment negatively about Leuba. All of them, would be relegated to the second or third chairs of the festival's Orquesta.

Schneider heavily influenced the composition of both the Sinfónica and the staff of the Conservatorio even moving Grossman to the contrabassoon prior to a presentation of the Orquesta at the United Nations headquarters on October 24, 1963, in which they were to play Casals' El Pessebre. Prior to this event, he submitted a list of American musicians, professors from the Conservatorio/members of the Sinfónica and José Figueroa to Carlos Passalacqua, having participated in the piece at Puerto Rico. Schneider employed his influence over Castro and superseded the tasks stated in the latter's contract, providing scatting reviews of previous applicants (such as cellist Rafael Figueroa) and requesting further auditions to ensure that they "met the standards" in subsequent applications.

Amaury Veray join the Conservatorio as part of the Theory and Composition Department. On December 28, 1961, Augusto Rodríguez quit the Conservatorio, but noted his willingness to remain teaching the chorus students until he was replaced. In 1962, Loren Glickman contracted William McColl to expand the Wind Department and include the clarinet. Félix Skowroneck and Arthur Grossman (later professor of bassoon) of Soni Ventorum joined the Conservatorio. Personnel that was not involved in teaching was affiliated to the Unión Independiente de Empleados de las Compañía de Fomento Industrial. Alfredo Romero of Public Instruction also joined as a part-time Theory and Sol-Fa professor. Olga Iglesias joined the Singing Department in an auxiliary role. In 1963, Manuel Verdeguer joined as double bass Professor. María de Lourdes Amadeo became an assistant within the Singing Department. In 1963, Robert Bonnevie joined the Conservatorio to replace Leuba.

=== Department and faculty changes ===
On September 3, 1963, José Buitrago wrote a letter to Muñoz Marín criticizing the work of Schneider, noting that he opposed and failed to fulfill the plan to use more Puerto Rican talents and that he lobbied to separate the Conservatorio and Sinfónica from Festival Casals if local talent was allowed. He argued that the foreign presence in the Sinfónica was responsible for it failing to be adopted by the public of the island as their own, while Schneider's own interest to project himself internationally disregarded the development of music. Muñoz Marín summoned Schneider, who arrived to Puerto Rico two days later, and attended a reunion with the governor and Juan Manuel García Passalacqua. The participation of the Sinfónica in ballet and opera was postponed until it was ready. Muñoz Marín declined separating the three entities and expressed that the type of music in the Festival should not be limited and that the integration of more Puerto Rican's to the International tours of the Sinfónica should be handled as "it [could be] justified".

On September 6, 1963, Alexander requested to Passalaqua the organization of a new choir and suggested bringing Robert Shaw to Puerto Rico. He received a response stating that for a yes and a half they had tried recruiting a "first-class professor" but that two Europeans had already "changed their minds [at] the last minute." Gueits wrote to Dinorah Press about the subject, informing him that a professor (Sergije Rainis) would arrive in late 1964 from Yugoslavia but that he would not make it in time for the next Casals Festival. The 1964 class was composed by 14 students, which grew to 21 within a year.

However, several faculty changes followed beginning when Urdaneta became ill and died. Harry Glanz would take over Henry Novak's post. Christopher Leuba later took over French horn from Holland. In 1964, cellist Adolfo Odnoposoff joined the Conservatorio as part of the Cords Department, taking over Marta Casals' post. Castro would leave his post due to a deteriorating health and would die three years later. On April 30, 1965, Víctor Tevah would become dean of studies of the Conservatorio, besides serving as director of the Sinfónica. An initiative by the Department of Instruction led to several music groups appearing in events directed at school students, including the Conservatorio's Trio.

In May 1965, Holland left and Henry Nowak took over the trumpet classes the following semester. In 1966, Raquel Torres de Gandía joined the Signing Department in an auxiliary role. During this year, the enrollment fee began being applied. In 1966, María Luisa Muñoz left the Conservatorio, with the still-student Cecilia Negró de Talavera being recruited as instructor. Josefina Peña de Luna would also serve as instructor of the Piano Department. That same year, James Thompson was incorporated as professor of trombone and tuba and Peter Kern as professors of flute. Luis Antonio Ramírez also joined the Harmony sessions. Bonnevie and Nowak were granted licenses, but the former left during the summer of 1967. Orlando Cora and Vanessa Vassallo would join the Piano Department in an auxiliary role, with the first later reprising the role for the Wind Department. Nancy Greenwood also joined the Singing Department as a pianist.

As part of a grants program that exclusively benefited foreign students, Pablo Casals taught a cello course that was held in November 1967, attended by 29 students from the Americas, Europe and Asia. On December 22, 1967, María Rodrigo died, being replaced by Rafael Aponte the next month. In June 1968, McColl left the Conservatorio, being replaced by Efraín Guigui. In August 1968, Antonio Iervolino was brought in as professor of French horn. Schneider wrote to Tevah questioning the move and arguing that it could be detrimental for him to serve as the 4th Horn of the festival's Orquesta. Guillermo Figueroa Sanabia and Leonardo Egúrbida joined to teach viola and guitar, respectively. Frederick L. King was responsible for taking over a new Percussion Department. David Bourns was brought in without guarantee to replace the departing Storch. When Grossman left, Elías Carmen replaced him and even participated in the local play Octandre by Edgar Varése. However, he died in March 1969, and Alan Brown succeeded him. On July 30, 1968, Guillermo Figueroa Sanabia was contracted as professor of viola.

An initiative known as Conciertos de Familia that allowed the personnel of the Conservatorio to offer concerts to the general public, debuted on November 27, 1968, and continuing every Sunday afterwards. This would serve as platform for the Conservatorio's Orquesta to commemorate the tenth anniversary, featuring both students and professors. In 1970, Aura Norma Robledo joined the Signing Department. In 1971, Ángeles Otein was offered the role of director of the opera classes, but declined and retired. As a consequence, Olga Iglesias was promoted. Of Kings' students, Manuel García, José Martín, Carlos Molina and José Alicea would become professors at the Conservatorio. On May 18, 1969, Raimis led the new chorus known as Los Madrigalistas at the Conservatorio. Later than month, a P.C. 636 was signed into law, recognizing graduates from the institution as music teachers. In 1970, Nowak took a prolonged license, recommending Orlando Cora or Nilda Pérez de Ledoux to replace him during the absence. Nelly García de Justicia and Roberto González were appointed instructors of Theory and Sol-Fa. Bourns was promoted to Professor of oboe.

=== Political influence on the institution ===
Initially serving to promote the Popular Democratic Party (PPD)'s industrialization project, the Conservatorio and Pjylarmonic Orquesta began serving to advance the agendas of both parties as bipartidism became prevalent in Puerto Rican politics. In 1972, after the PPD won the elections, José A. Francheschini left the office of Executive Director of Festival Casals, being replaced by Elías López. A year later, Casals himself died and Montañez became the president. José Figueroa was named rector of the Conservatorio. After Antonio Iervolino requested a license in 1973, he received approval until Pouletz fell ill. That year the budget for the institution was $685,000 and while arguing against fully integrating Casals Festival Inc. to the ICP, Alegría noted that despite being academically equivalent, the School of Plastic Arts only received $90,000 in funding.

Fomento Commissioner William Schuman produced a study titled Music in Puerto Rico. The Next Decade (1972-1981), which argued focusing on strings as part of the Crash String Program. The program began during López Sobá's tenure as executive director and had José Reyna (a supporter of Carmelina Figueroa's Musical Pedagogy and its violin class) as patron. The first tryouts took place in September 1974, with an initial class of 108 for violin and 26 for violoncello (most of the declined were due to age reasons, excluding "special" cases). It began functions in October 1974. Between 1975 and 1979, it was overseen by the dean of studies and had Kachiro Figueroa, Henry Hutchinson Glanville, Wilmer Carrasquillo, José D. Reyna, Augusto Sanabia and Osvaldo Porrata as teachers. Edwin Ramos succeeded Matilla as professor of Music History.

In 1973, María Esther Robles was appointed director of the Opera Workshop, but clashed with the head of the Singing Department. She employed the Comciertos en Familia to host a number of plays including The Wedding of Figaro, The Old Maid and the Thief, Don Giovanni, Cosi Fan Tutte, Manon, The Medium, La Boheme, Rigoletto and Don Pasquale among others, throughout the decade. In 1974, Kern was replaced by Jean Louis Kashy. During this year, Nowak received another license. Pavel Burda served as professor during one year. In 1974, the Conjunto de Cámara de San Juan replaced the departing Soni Ventorum. While GuiGui served a license, Gino Cioffi replaced him. However, he had to work a schedule that included work abroad and in 1975, Kathleen Jones replaced him as professor of clarinet. In 1975, Odnoposoff's alumni Orlando Guillot served as auxiliary professor of cello. Cora also took over Nowak's role. Festival Casals' board named Elías López as president and he named Andrés Quiñones Vizcarrondo Executive Vicepresident and Marta Casals Musical Director. Iervolino requested another license, to which Quiñones responded by noting how several professors had received license and argued that it was affecting the Conservatorio and the request was ultimately declined, leading to him leaving. Luis Arroyo filled the vacancy. Quiñones adopted a hard approach on the matter, communicating with Guigui and informing him that if he did not return prior to the 1975 second semester, he would be waived. By August, a student strike halted work at the Conservatorio. Adolfo Odnoposoff left on a license, with Francois Bayaud replacing him as cello teacher within the String Program. The following year, vicepresident of the Festival Casals Mario Martínez Camacho contracted Joaquín Vidaechea to replace him. During the year, teachers sent by the Middle States Association determined that the String Program "promised to bring a new crop of violinists, violists and cellists for the Conservatory", expecting a progression in the years to come. This assessment allowed the institution to receive additional funding. The Observatorio began participating annually in the MONCA. The first year, Margarita Castro Alberty reached the final, something that Elaine Arandes repeated in 1984. Over a dozen singers have graduated from the Opera Taller to become international performers.

In 1976, Tom Welzel began a one-year tenure. Olga Iglesias left the Conservatorio, with Robles becoming head of the Singing Department. The role of executive director was created to accommodate José Figueroa Sanabia. In 1977, María Luisa García was contracted in a part-time role within the Piano Department. Kristan Phillips also joined as professor. Orlando Cárdenas joined the String Program as professor of bass. The String Program was given additional resources. The initiative produced its own chorus initially led by John Paul González. Afterwards, Zoraida López, Pablo Pomales, Joan Herrero and Soraya Lugo led it.

Jaime Rivera served as dean of studies. An incident in which the pages for Concert No. 3 disappeared from pianist Horacio Gutiérrez's belongings was reported on April 13, 1978. Robles placed the blame on local pianist Pedro Rojas, who had complained about bringing in a foreigner, removing him from the Conservatorio. In 1979, James Thompson quit his office as professor of trombone and tuba. William J. Stanley, Aldo Torres, José Pérez Ayala (who sued after being fired, claiming contract breach and received a settlement), Héctor Maldonado and Jaime Morales held the office for brief periods afterwards. That same year, Vanessa Vassallo was promoted to piano professor. Roselín Pabón was placed in charge of the Conservatorio's symphonic orquesta and by October was leading pieces like Bach's Symphony in B-flat Major and Mendelssohn's Piano concert No. 1 in sol minore op. 25. That same year, María Luisa García was promoted to instructor.

Another strike took place in 1979 under the new president of the Federation of Musicians, Ángel Náter, leading to the cancellation of that year's festival and the appointment of Sidney Harth as director. The strike led to then president of the Senate of Puerto Rico to make a call for "promotion of Arts as a goal", which preceded the approval of several laws altering the musical and cultural landscape the following year, replacing Festival Casals Inc. with the Administración para el Fomento de las Artes y la Cultura. Among them were Law 44 which created the Corporación de la Orquesta Sinfónica de Puerto Rico and Law 77 which created the Corporación del Conservatorio de Música de Puerto Rico, both of them falling under the new umbrella. Within the AFAC, Jaime Rivera became executive director of the Conservatorio. The board of Festival Casals created the role of Coordinator of the String Program, supporting Obed Tirado Tolentino of Theory and Sol-Fa.

=== Community initiatives and internal reform ===
Pabón created an elementary, intermediate and advanced classification that allowed multiple orquestas under the umbrella. In 1980, violinists José Figueroa and Saúl Ovcharov were contracted for the String Program. Phillips left and George Mardinly began a one-year tenure. María del Carmen Gil joined the Piano Department as a professor. The Orquesta and Conservatorio would remain under Fomento this year, when the separate Administración para el Fomento de las Artes y Cultura was established.

In 1981, Víctor Meléndez Dohnert was brought in as professor of Theory and Sol-Fa. During this year the new Department of Musical Education was added at the initiative of Nelly García de Justicia. Amílcar Tirado, Pablo Ortiz Coto and Aristeo Rivera Zayas would collaborate with this initiative. Manuel Verdeguer died. In 1982, the Conservatorio's symphonic orchestra participated in the birthday celebrations of pianist Jesús María Sanromá. In February 1983, Rainis left the Conservatorio, being followed by several short-tenured directors (Ángel Mattos, Miles Hernández, Ricardo Cabrera, Roselín Pabón and Susan Young). In 1983, Camerata Caribe was born as a spiritual successor to the Conjunto de Cámara de San Juan. William Rivera Ortiz became the regular director of the chorus. A quartet named Toccata was created.

During this time, camps and youth festivals were being held as part of an initiative of Pabón and Tirado. In 1983, these were expanded in a spinoff, the OEA and AFAC-sanctioned Festival de Orquestas Sinfónicas de las Américas, in which students and professors participated along International talents. By the following year, the Conservatorio was hosting the preparation for this event. Administrative changes continued, Meléndez Dohnert became the interim director of the Crash String Program. Obed Tirado was also promoted to interim executive director of the Conservatorio, replacing Jaime Rivera.

A decade after the initial Middle States assessment, the CSP was led by María Cristina Firpi (harp), Orlando Cárdenas and Federico Silva (countrabass), David Burns (oboe), Mary Ann Campbell & Joaquín Vidaechea (violoncello), Francisco Figueroa Luciano & Guillermo Figueroa Sanabia (viola), Robert Donehew, Cheryl Trace, Vīctor Sánchez, Carlos Rodríguez Fusté, Saúl Ovcharov, Jaime Medina, Henry Hutchinson Negrón, Kachiro Figueroa and José Figueroa (violin), Luis Enrique Juliá and José Rodríguez Alvira (guitar). Theory and Sol-Fa had seen the involvement of Víctor Meléndez Dohnert, Gloria Navarro, José Crespo, Annette Espada, Brenda Tirado and Annette Blackman. While Pablo Pomales had been included as professor of chorus. After evaluating the Conservatorio's performance for the Middle States Association, Nancy Hess of Temple University proposed an exchange between both institutions. Harry Rosario, second oboe of the Symphonic Orchestra of Puerto Rico, created the Conservatorio's Concert Band.

The elimination of the AFAC led to the creation of the Corporación de las Artes Musicales (CAM), under which the institution was placed along the Symphony Orchestra and the Casals Festival. In 1986, the Asociación de Profesores del Conservatorio was recognized, being the first time that a union was allowed to operate within the organization. Gil was named its president. Under the CAM, the role of rector was created to replace the executive director, with Jorge Pérez Rolón filling the role. The General Council of the Conservatorio was in turn led by Ismael Rodríguez Bou while Roberto Sierra was Dean of Studies. However, an attempt by Pérez to establish a popular music bachelor's degree led to a clash with the Asociación de Profesores. The rector left his office and was replaced by Sierra. After Firpi left, she was replaced by Marcelino Canino. Meanwhile, Pabón led the Juvenile Symphony Orquesta in a series of concerts at Santo Domingo and La Romana. In 1987, Bourns was granted a license, with Harry Rosario taking over. That same year, Susan Pabón joined the Singing Department.

The executive director of the Corporación de las Artes Musicales also removed Pabón from his role, being replaced by Kerlinda Degláns who coordinated collaborations between the Conservatorio' and the UPR while also leading FOSJA. Jorge Martínez Solá requested an amendment to the law that created the Compañía de Variedades Artísticas to place it under the Conservatorio. A series of protests by the professors led by Leonardo Egúbida and José Rodríguez Alvira led to Pérez Rolón quoting the office of rector. However, the legislature approved the transfer which was signed into law on July 20, 1988. The integration increased the Conservatorio's operational budget. The Extencion and Continued Education programs would be run by it. In 1989, Keith Brown was placed in charge of FOSJA. In July, CSP alumni violinist Vanessa Defilló entered the roles of Adjunct Dean of Administration and Director of Special Programs within the Conservatorio and of assistant director of the program. In August, Canino recommended Irma Ramos to replace him as harp professor of the CSP. Irma Isern took the role of rector from Sierra.

=== CAM and union protests ===
Senator Velda González led public hearings on irregularities involving the administration of the CAM, in particular its president, and which were funded by money that was supposed to go to the Conservatorio. By October, both professors and students were protesting against the CAM, its executive director Jorge Martínez Solá and the Conservatorio's General Council due to the lack of considerations to name Isern rector. According to them, the accreditation was in jeopardy. Rodríguez Bou dismissed claims that Ivonne Figueroa was the most popular candidate, citing that it was not a popularity contest, with his original candidate (Roberto González) not being considered among the poll. On October 18, 1989, the community voted in favor of the destitution of all members of the General Council and Isern and requested investigations on CAM and Martínez Solá. The head of departments and academic legislature left their posts. The Unión de Empleados no Docentes del Conservatorio held strikes during which the administration spent $8,000 in legal fees and $12,200 in security guards, before relenting to an accord.

The professors voted in favor of the Asociación de Profesores del Conservatorio de Música to remain as their official union. On October 26, 1989, the Senate of Puerto Rico ordered an investigation on the matter. On December 13, 1989, the governor replaced Rovira with Juan Albors, who directly addressed the situation at the Conservatorio. The backlash led to Bou being ousted as president of the General Council. On May 15, 1990, Howard Simmons of the Middle States Association warned CAM about the impending discreditation, arguing that CAM "had interfered in the administrative affairs of the Conservatory and had abrogated the power of the General Council" and demandes that the institution be provided with "greater fiscal and academic autonomy". In response, CAM President of the Board of Directors Pepín Rovira Sánchez granted more powers to the General Council of the Conservatorio.

In 1990, Elfrén Flores received a non-guaranteed contract as professor of trombone and tuba. Julio Suárez replaced a departing Tirado in the Crash String Program. Exor Rodríguez also began what became the Programa de Orquestas Sinfónicas Juveniles. Manuel García received a spot as permanent professor. María Esther Robles died on February 11, 1993, and Susan Pabón was promoted to take over the Opera Workshop. Under Raymond Torres Santos' tenure as rector Puerto Rican and contemporary music festivals were held. In 1994, Luis Biava was placed in charge of FOSJA. Luis Hernández Mergal was brought in to lead the Escuela Preparatoria del Conservatorio. After Vidaechea retired, he was replaced by his student Jesús Morales, who served as both professor of cello and participated in the String Program for children.

The Theory and Composition Department expanded to include jazz harmony and keyboard harmony classes, also including Emanuel Oliviero, Alberto Rodríguez Ortiz, Sheila Ortiz, Alfonso Fuentes, Armando Ramírez, and Ignacio Morales Nieva. In 1995, former two-time director of the Theory and Composition, Amaury Veray, died while still involved in the Conservatorio. That same year, Rivera Ortiz entered a study license that extended until 1998, leaving room for Clark Mallory and Rafael Irizarry. Ilca López also took over the Opera Workshop and hosted several plays. During this time, external efforts led to the integration of Puerto Rico to the Metropolitan Opera National Council Auditions.

Under Abraham Peña the Federation of Musicians questioned the recruitment and payment practices at the Conservatorio and the Orquesta Sinfónica, taking his concerns to the political spheres. On August 9, 1995, Law No. 181 led to the Conservatorio's removal from CAM and being given full fiscal autonomy and a board of directors (with Agustín Costas leading it) being created to replace the General Council. The Unión de Empleados No Docentes del Conservatorio was dissolved. That saw year, the Percussion Festival began.

In 1996, José Alicea proposed a Saxophone Professorship to Obed Tirado and a stage band course to Kathleen Jones. He also created the Conjunto de Percusión del Conservatorio. Saxophone and harp specializations were added to the Music Bachelors, while the Puerto Rican cuatro debuted, with Orlando Laureano, Irma Ramos and Wilfredo Corps. That year, the Asociación de Profesores del Conservatorio de Música clashed with the administration, leading to the Junta de Relaciones del Trabajo appearing before the Tribunal Superior on their behalf. After the institution was ordered to begin negotiations, it appealed to the Tribunal Supremo, where its lack of direct profit (and its dependence on government funds and legislative grants) led to it not being recognized as a patron and thus, being free from having to recognized unions.

In 1997, trumpetist Roberto Ramírez replaced Cora and Rúben Ramírez joined as tuba professor. A license given to Luis Arroyo gave temporary work to Raimundo Díaz. In 1998, Alicea's proposal for a stage band class was accepted and given to new arrival Andrew Lázaro. Defilló left the institution to work as a lawyer.

When María del Carmen Gil took over as rector in 1999, she discontinued the Puerto Rican and contemporary festivals. The board led by Agustín Costa acquired the old Hogar de Niñas, which began being restored. Gil also clashed with the Asociación de Empleados No Docentes, based on the previous decision against the Asociación de Profesores. After being fired, José Ernesto Ayala was fired while his contract as trombone professor was still active, leading to a lawsuit. Under the administration of Gil, Dean of Academic Affairs José Rodríguez Alvira removed the directors of the departments. As part of the new structure, the Winds Department added Ricardo López. The Education Department included Jorge Martínez Solá, Daniel Zambrano, Harold Leonel, Luis Bermúdez and Rafael Enrique Iryzarry. The Singing Department added Provi Seín and Rosabel Otón.

=== Relocation and internal changes ===
In 1999, Flores left after receiving a non-negotiated cut to his work hours. Luis Fred Carrasquillo of the Sinfónica was brought in as replacement. Vanessa Vassallo was recognized as professor. On March 23, 1999, the Secretary of Transportation and Public Works transferred the Hogar Insular de Niñas building to the Conservatorio. By the early 2000s, most of the Sinfónica's string sections were composed by graduates from the String Program. By 2001, the products of the juvenile orquesta was performing professional grade pieces at the Festival Casals. The possibility of introducing a bachelor's degree in Puerto Rican cuatro was discussed but did not materialize. The new building, however, proved inadequate for the Conservatorio to function with the natural conditions provided by the ocean's proximity, forcing everything to run under an air conditioned setting that resulted in notable energy spending.

The Department of Education was replaced by the Department of General Studies, which adopted an American model. The Department of Theory and Composition received a Musical Theory course, which mixed several areas of study. In 2002, Manuel Ceide was contracted to serve as director. Gil contracted Justino Díaz as resident artist, leaving the scenarios on March 29, 2003. On August 28, 2003, the Compañía de Variedades Artísticas ceased to exist. When Law 223 (Ley de Música Autóctona y Tradición de Puerto Rico) was passed, senator María de Lourdes Santiago revisited the idea of offering a degree in Puerto Rican cuatro. Orlando Laureano began informally offering courses.

The faculty of the institution had aged, and several changes followed. On August 15, 2007, Vanessa Vassallo retired. When Verdeguer died, Federico Silva, Orlando Cárdenas and José García inherited his work. Iván Gutiérrez, a former student under Holland and Nowak, would later serve as professor of the Programa de Extensión. Gloria Navarro, who had served as a teacher of the String Program from the onset, was placed in the Music Theory and Sol-Fa Department. When Elías López Sobá left to join the UPR, he was replaced by Luz Negró de Hutchinson. In 2005, Carmen Rivera Lassén was assigned as a Spanish teacher. In 2006, William Woodruff joined the Singing Department. In 2007, Manuel García was fired after two decades of working as a professor without permanency.

In 2008, Guillermo L. Martínez offered a donation of $750,000 to the Conservatorio in exchange for naming a concert room/theater that was being constructed after him and that his name be highlighted in documents. In 2009, Antonio Barasorda joined as a professor within the Singing Department. That same year, Justino Díaz's tenure as resident artist came to an end. Gil pushed for POSJU to be replaced by a Program named 100x35 during the Luis Fortuño administration. To fund this initiative, the rector collaborated with Roberto Arango in a project to redirect a million in funds from the ICP's Fondo Puertorriqueño para el Quehacer Cultural towards it. Control over the funds for the Orquesta System and Juvenile/Infantile Chorus was also proposed, but defeated before the Senate. During the following years, support for Gil dwindled and she was ousted following an investigation requested by the Board of Directors (led by Firpi) to Dean of Administration Juan Carlos Hernández in January 2013, being replaced by Hernández Mergal. His stay was brief and he was replaced by Carlos Conde.

The Preparatory School Dean's Office was created when the Conservatorio was reorganized, working along Administration and Finances, Student Affairs, Academic Affairs. Also absorbing the String Program and the elemental, intermediate and advanced orchestras. A Pre-School Education Program was included, helping identify talented children. Teachers were trained to teach children from kinder to sixth grade. The Jazz and Caribbean Music Department was also created with brief consideration from the Academic Senate, leading to the program beginning with an emphasis on jazz but not touching on the eponymous regional (or Puerto Rican) music. Alfonso Fuentes made an assessment in 2010 arguing that the concept needed work, also noting that the Caribbean history was not actually being taught.

Student participation in the MONCA continued until 2010. On May 20, 2011, the Conservatorio announced new degrees in Puerto Rican cuatro, Caribbean music and jazz.

== Academics ==
The conservatory offers a variety of post-secondary degrees in music, the post-graduate program offers bachelor's degrees in:musical composition, music education, voice, classical guitar, symphony instruments, jazz, Caribbean music, and piano. The graduate program consists of: master's degrees in music education, voice, classical guitar, symphony instruments and piano, as well as artists diplomas in voice, classical guitar, symphony instruments, jazz, Caribbean music, and piano. It also offers continuing education programs, and teacher certifications. In addition to its regular academic programs, it organizes various international student exchange programs with music schools all around the world.

The Conservatory's Preparatory School offers programs for children, teenagers and adults with the purpose of encouraging music appreciation within the local community. These programs do not offer degrees or certifications, but provide basic to near expert level teaching to regular citizens who are not in its formal academic program.

=== Accreditations ===
The conservatory is accredited by various federal and state educational associations, including:

- National Association of Schools of Music
- Middle States Association of Colleges and Schools
- National Guild for Community Arts Education
- Puerto Rico Education Council

== Campus ==
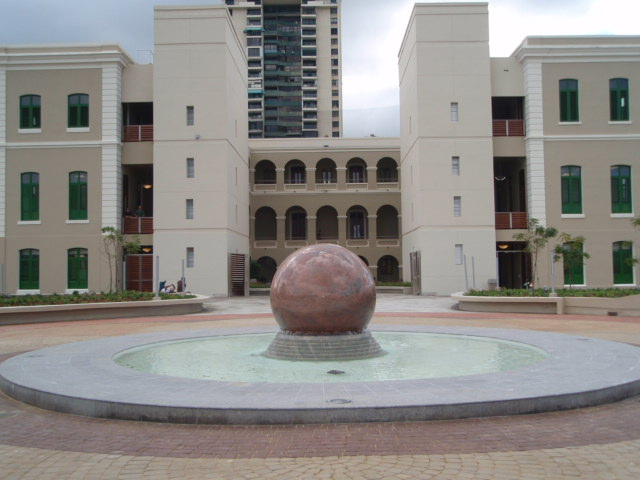
North courtyard of the Conservatory of Music of Puerto Rico

From 1960 to 2008 the Puerto Rico Conservatory of Music was located in Hato Rey, in the former facilities of an old factory. In 2009 they moved to the new facilities in the Miramar section of the island's capital.

The conservatory is composed of three main buildings:

1. The Historic Building. Formerly known as Mothers of the Sacred Heart Private School (Spanish: Colegio de las Madres del Sagrado Corazón) and Miramar's Old Refuge for Girls (Spanish: Antiguo Asilo de Niñas de Miramar), is part of the United States National Register of Historic Places. The building's reconstruction lasted from 2001 to 2008, and it has been operating since 2009. It hosts the administrative offices, computer and piano labs, classrooms, practice rooms, the Luis A. Ferré Patio (north), and the Pablo Casals Patio (south).
2. The parking lot and green-roof. Hosts the Rafael Hernández Amphitheater and the Laguna Plaza which offers to the academic community and visitors an incredible view of the Condado lagoon, and it is the biggest green-roof in Puerto Rico.
3. The Academic Building. Inaugurated in August 2012, consists of the following facilities:
  - First floor: The Amaury Veray Library, a unit of the Ángel Ramos Foundation Center for Learning Resources (Spanish: Centro de Recursos para el Aprendizaje Fundación Ángel Ramos), the Cecilia Negrón de Talavera wing, practice and rehearsal rooms.
  - Second floor: The Bertita & Guillermo L. Martínez Theater (Concert and rehearsal halls: Jesús María Sanromá Concert Hall, the Anthony "Junior" Soto Hall, and the José "Pepito" Figueroa Hall), individual classrooms, practice cubicles, and lockers.
  - Third floor: More individual classrooms, practice cubicles, and lockers.

The facilities host a variety of concerts for the nearby communities featuring students, teachers, the Puerto Rico Symphony Orchestra, and famous international performers.

== Affiliates ==
The conservatory is a participating member of various US, Puerto Rico, and international music and arts associations, including:

- American Association of Collegiate Registrars and Admission Officers
- Hispanic Association of Colleges and Universities
- Puerto Rico Association of Student Financial Aid Administrators
- American Library Association
- Music Library Association
- Puerto Rico Librarians Society (Sociedad de Bibliotecarios de Puerto Rico, in Spanish)
- International Association of Music Libraries
- ARCHIRED of Puerto Rico
- Caribbean University Research and Institutional Libraries Association
- MENC: The National Association for Music Education
- Suzuki Association of the Americas
- Kindermusik International
- Association of Fund-Raising Professionals
- International Personnel Management Association
- Steinway and Sons
