= 1788 in music =

== Events ==
- January 9 – The elderly Carl Philipp Emanuel Bach reviews Johann Nikolaus Forkel's book Allgemeine Geschichte der Musik in the Hamburgischer unpartheyischer Correspondent.
- January 22 – Composer Ignaz Pleyel marries Franziska Gabrielle Ignatia Lefebvre, daughter of a tapestry maker.
- January 26 – Australia Day: HMS Sirius (1786) leads the First Fleet into landing at Sydney Cove (which will become Sydney) to begin the settlement of Australia; it carries Surgeon George Worgan's London-made square piano which will remain in the country and be donated to the Western Australian Academy of Performing Arts collection in 2016.
- February 6 – The Kärntnertortheater in Vienna closes, after the German Opera Company disbands.
- February 12 – Antonio Salieri is appointed Imperial Royal Kapellmeister by Emperor Joseph II of Austria, in succession to Giuseppe Bonno, who is forcibly retired.
- March 6 – Domenico Cimarosa, recently invited to St Petersburg by the Empress Catherine II of Russia, premières his La felicità inaspetata, which fails to impress his new patron.
- June 25 – Publication of three string quintets (K.406, 515, 516) by Wolfgang Amadeus Mozart is postponed for a year because of a lack of take-up of subscriptions.
- July 17 – Carl Ditters von Dittersdorf is officially dismissed from his post as Amtshauptmann of Freiwaldau, but actually continues in the position for another seven years.
- November 25 – Three weeks before his death, Carl Philipp Emanuel Bach writes his last known letter, to Johann Jacob Heinrich Westphal.

== Opera ==
- Giuseppe Cambini – Le bon pére
- Thomas Carter – The Constant Maid, or Poll of Plympton
- Luigi Cherubini – Ifigenia in Aulide
- Domenico Cimarosa
  - La felicità inaspettata
  - La vergine del sole
- Franz Danzi – Die Mitternachtsstunde
- Giovanni Paisiello
  - L'Amor Contrastato
  - Fedra, premiered Jan. 1 in Naples
- Antonio Sacchini – Arvire et Évélina (posthumous "tragédie lyrique", finished by Jean-Baptiste Rey), premiered April 29.
- Antonio Salieri
  - Axur, Re d'Ormus (libretto by Lorenzo Da Ponte after Beaumarchais)
  - Il Talismano (libretto by Lorenzo Da Ponte after Goldoni)
- Joseph Weigl – Il pazzo per forza

== Classical music ==
- William Billings – The Singing Master’s Assistant (including "Vermont" and "Washington")
- Henry Bishop – Six New Minuets and Twelve Country Dances (including "Knoll Park")
- Domenico Cimarosa – Atene edificata (cantata)
- Muzio Clementi
  - 3 Piano Trios, Op. 21
  - 3 Piano Trios, Op. 22
  - Keyboard sonata Op. 24/1
- Michel Corrette – Messe pour le tems de Noël
- Carl Ditters von Dittersdorf – 6 String Quartets
- Jan Ladislav Dussek
  - 3 Sonatas for Keyboard with Violin, Op. 5
  - Three piano sonatas C.41–43
- Joseph-Francois Garnier – Simphonie Concertante for 2 Oboes
- Joseph Haydn
  - 8 Nocturnes, Hob.II:25–32
  - String Quartet in C major, Hob.III:57
  - String Quartet in G major, Hob.III:58
  - String Quartet in E major, Hob.III:59
  - String Quartet in A major, Hob.III:60
  - String Quartet in F minor, Hob.III:61
  - String Quartet in B-flat major, Hob.III:62
  - Baryton Trio in A major, Hob.XI:6
  - Baryton Trio in A major, Hob.XI:8
  - Symphony No.90 in C major, Hob.I:90
  - Symphony No.91 in E-flat major, Hob.I:91
- Michael Haydn
  - Die Ährenleserin (singspiel)
  - Symphony No.37 in D major, MH 476
- Pelham Humfrey – O Lord, My God
- Frantisek Kotzwara – The Battle of Prague (piano with commentary)
- Leopold Kozeluch – Piano Sonata, Op. 26, No. 3
- Anton Kraft – 3 Cello Sonatas, Op. 1
- Rodolphe Kreutzer – Violin Concerto No.6 in E minor
- Jean-Baptiste Krumpholz – 6 Harp Sonatas, Opp. 13–14
- Vicente Martín y Soler – 12 Canzonette Italiane
- Wolfgang Amadeus Mozart
  - 6 German Dances, K. 536
  - "Ich möchte wohl der Kaiser sein" ("Ein deutsches Kriegslied"), K. 539
  - Adagio in B minor, K. 540 (dated March 19)
  - Un bacio di mano, K. 541 (dated May)
  - Piano Trio in E major, K. 542
  - Symphony No. 39 in E-flat major, K. 543
  - Piano Trio in C major, K. 548
  - Più non si trovano, K. 549
  - Symphony No. 40 in G minor, K. 550
  - Symphony No. 41 in C major, K. 551, "Jupiter"
  - Canon for 3 voices in A major (Caro bell'idol mio), K. 562
  - Divertimento in E-flat major, K. 563
  - Piano Trio in G major, K. 564
  - 6 German Dances, K. 567
  - 12 Minuets, K. 568
- Giovanni Paisiello – Duet for two violins
- Ignaz Pleyel
  - Violin Concerto in D major, B.103A
  - 3 Quintets, B.280–282
  - 6 Keyboard Trios, B.431–436
- Alexander Reinagle – Federal March
- Giuseppe Sarti – 3 Sonatas for Keyboard and Violin, Op. 4
- Giovanni Battista Viotti
  - Violin Concerto No.13 in A major
  - Violin Concerto No.14 in A minor
  - 6 Violin Sonatas, W 5.1–6 (Op. 4)

== Methods and theory writings ==
- Johann Nikolaus Forkel – Allgemeine Geschichte der Musik
- Ferdinand Kauer – Kurzgefaßte Anweisung das Violoncell zu spielen
- Vincenzo Manfredini – Difesa della musica moderna e de' suoi celebri esecutori
- Ernst Wilhelm Wolf – Musikalischer Unterricht

== Births ==
- January 5 – Caspar Ett, composer and musician (died 1847)
- January 8
  - Erzherzog Rudolph, composer and archduke (died 1831)
  - Duke Eugen of Württemberg, composer and general (died 1857)
- January 22 – George Gordon Byron, lyricist and poet (died 1824)
- January 31 – Felice Romani, librettist and writer (died 1865)
- February 10 – Johann Peter Pixis, composer (died 1874)
- March 10 – Joseph von Eichendorff, lyricist and poet (died 1857)
- May 16 – Friedrich Rückert, librettist and poet (died 1866)
- August 20 – José Bernardo Alcedo, composer (died 1878)
- August 26 – Aloys Schmitt, composer (died 1866)
- September 5 – George Macfarren, lyricist (died 1843)
- September 28 – Carl Christian Philipp Reichel composer (died 1857)
- October 11 – Simon Sechter, composer (died 1867)
- October 20 – Philip Knapton, composer (died 1833)
- November 6 – Giuseppe Donizetti, composer (died 1856)
- November 11 – Michał Wielhorski, Russian composer (died 1856)
- December 18 – Camille Pleyel, musician (died 1855)
- December 21 – Charles Chaulieu, composer (died 1849)
- December 26 – Karl Anton Philipp Braun, composer (died 1835)
- date unknown
  - Brita Catharina Lidbeck, Swedish concert singer and member of the Royal Swedish Academy of Music (died 1864)
  - John David Loder, composer and violinist (died 1846)

== Deaths ==
- January 15 – Gaetano Latilla, composer (born 1711)
- March 2 – Salomon Gessner, lyricist and poet (born 1730)
- March 29 – Charles Wesley, hymn-writer (born 1707)
- April 12
  - Carlo Antonio Campioni, composer (born 1720)
  - Karl Joseph Toeschi, composer (born 1731)
- April 15 – Giuseppe Bonno, composer (born 1711)
- May 17 – Dorothea Biehl, librettist (born 1731)
- June 28 – Johann Christoph Vogel, composer
- July 14 – Johann Gottfried Müthel, composer (born 1728)
- November 2 – Johann Samuel Schröter, German composer (born 1753)
- December 12 – Joseph Gibbs, composer (born 1699)
- December 14 – Carl Philipp Emanuel Bach, composer (born 1714)
