= Simon Rattle =

British conductor (born 1955)

Sir Simon Rattle OM CBE
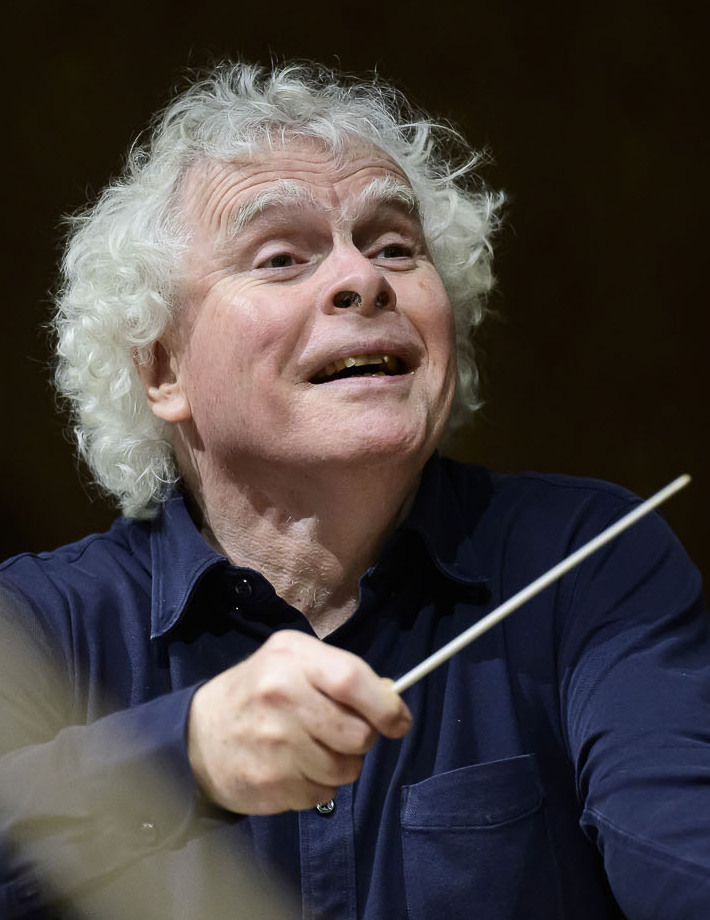
- Rattle conducting the Czech Philharmonic in 2024
- Born: Simon Denis Rattle; 19 January 1955 (age 71); Liverpool, England
- Citizenship: United Kingdom; Germany
- Education: Royal Academy of Music, London
- Occupation: Conductor
- Organizations: BPO; LSO; CBSO; BRSO
- Spouses: Elise Ross (1980–1995); Candace Allen (1996–2004); Magdalena Kožená (2008–present)
- Children: 5

Sir Simon Denis Rattle (born 19 January 1955) is a British conductor. He rose to international prominence during the 1980s and 1990s, while music director of the City of Birmingham Symphony Orchestra (1980–1998). Rattle was principal conductor of the Berlin Philharmonic from 2002 to 2018, and music director of the London Symphony Orchestra from 2017 to 2023. He has been chief conductor of Bavarian Radio Symphony Orchestra since September 2023. Among the world's leading conductors, in a 2015 Bachtrack poll, he was ranked by music critics as one of the world's best living conductors.

Rattle is also the patron of Birmingham Schools' Symphony Orchestra, arranged during his tenure with CBSO in the mid-1990s. The Youth Orchestra is now under the auspices of charitable business Services for Education. He received the Brit Award for Outstanding Contribution to Music in 2001 at the Classic Brit Awards.

== Biography ==
=== Early life ===
Simon Rattle was born in Liverpool, England, the son of Pauline Lila Violet (née Greening) and Denis Guttridge Rattle, a lieutenant in the Royal Naval Volunteer Reserve during World War II. He was educated at Liverpool College. Although Rattle studied piano and violin, his early work with orchestras was as a percussionist for the Merseyside Youth Orchestra (now the Liverpool Philharmonic Youth Orchestra). He entered the Royal Academy of Music (now part of the University of London) in 1971. There, his teachers included John Carewe. In 1974, his graduation year, Rattle won the John Player International Conducting Competition.

After organising and conducting a performance of Mahler's Second Symphony while he was still at the academy, he was talent-spotted by the music agent Martin Campbell-White, of Harold Holt Ltd (now Askonas Holt Ltd), who has since managed Rattle's career. He spent the academic year 1980–81 at St Anne's College, Oxford studying English Language and Literature. He had been attracted to the college by the reputation of Dorothy Bednarowska, fellow and tutor in English. He was elected an Honorary Fellow of St Anne's in 1991. He was admitted to the degree of Doctor of Music honoris causa of the University of Oxford in 1999.

=== Early career ===
In 1974, he was made assistant conductor of the Bournemouth Symphony Orchestra.

He joined the Glyndebourne Festival Opera music staff at the age of 20 in 1975. He went on to conduct over 200 performances of 13 different operas at Glyndebourne and on tour during the subsequent 28 years.

His first Prom at the Royal Albert Hall, conducting the London Sinfonietta, was, according to the BBC Proms Archive website, on 9 August 1976. The programme included Harrison Birtwistle's Meridian and Arnold Schoenberg's First Chamber Symphony. In 1977, he became assistant conductor of the Royal Liverpool Philharmonic.

=== City of Birmingham Symphony Orchestra ===
His time with the City of Birmingham Symphony Orchestra (CBSO) from 1980 to 1998 drew him to the attention of critics and the public. In 1980, Rattle became the CBSO's principal conductor and artistic adviser, and in 1990, music director. Rattle increased both his profile and that of the orchestra over his tenure. One of his long-term concert projects was the series of concerts of 20th-century music titled "Towards the Millennium". One other major achievement during his time was the move of the CBSO from its former venue, Birmingham Town Hall, to a newly built concert hall, Symphony Hall, in 1991. The BBC commissioned film director Jaine Green to follow him in his final year with the CBSO to make Simon Rattle—Moving On.

Rattle was appointed a CBE in 1987 and made a Knight Bachelor in 1994. In 1992, Rattle was named a principal guest conductor of the Orchestra of the Age of Enlightenment (OAE), along with Frans Brüggen. Rattle now has the title of Principal Artist with the OAE. In 2001, he conducted the OAE at Glyndebourne in their first production of Fidelio with a period-instrument orchestra.

Rattle strongly supported youth music. He led two attempts at gaining the record for the World's Largest Orchestra, both designed to raise awareness of youth music in schools. The first, in 1996, was unsuccessful. The second, in 1998, did succeed and the record held at nearly 4,000 musicians until it was broken in 2000 by a group in Vancouver.

In 2000, Rattle was presented with the Gold Medal of the Royal Philharmonic Society. From 29 April to 17 May 2002, he conducted the Vienna Philharmonic orchestra, making live recordings of the complete Beethoven symphonies. In May 2006, he was made an Honorary Fellow of the Society of Arts. In 2011, the Royal Academy of Music presented him with an honorary doctorate. He was appointed member of the Order of Merit (OM) in the 2014 New Year Honours.

Rattle conducted the London Symphony Orchestra at the Opening of the London Olympics 2012, performing "Chariots of Fire" with guest Rowan Atkinson playing his Mr. Bean character.

=== Berlin Philharmonic Orchestra ===
Rattle made his conducting debut with the Berlin Philharmonic (BPO) in 1987, in a performance of Gustav Mahler's Symphony No. 6. In 1999, Rattle was appointed as successor to Claudio Abbado as the orchestra's principal conductor. The appointment was decided on in a 23 June vote by the orchestra's members. At the time the vote was considered somewhat controversial, as several members of the orchestra were earlier reported to have preferred Daniel Barenboim for the post. Nevertheless, Rattle won the post and proceeded to win over his detractors by refusing to sign the contract until he had ensured that every member of the orchestra was paid fairly, and also that the orchestra would gain artistic independence from the Berlin Senate.

Before leaving for Germany and on his arrival, Rattle controversially attacked the British attitude to culture in general, and in particular the artists of the Britart movement, together with the state funding of culture in the UK.

Rattle reorganised the Berlin Philharmonic into a foundation, meaning its activities are more under the control of the members rather than politicians. He has also ensured that orchestra members' wages have increased quite dramatically, after falling over the previous few years. He gave his first concert as principal conductor of the BPO on 7 September 2002, leading performances of Thomas Adès' Asyla and Mahler's Symphony No. 5, performances which received rave reviews from the press worldwide and were recorded for CD and DVD release by EMI. Early collaborative projects in the Berlin community with Rattle and the BPO involved a choreographed performance of Stravinsky's The Rite of Spring danced by school children, documented in Rhythm Is It!, and a film project with Mark-Anthony Turnage's Blood on the Floor. He has also continued to champion contemporary music in Berlin. The orchestra has established its first education department during Rattle's tenure.

Criticism of Rattle's tenure with the Berlin Philharmonic began to appear after their first season together, and continued in their second season. Rattle said in 2005 that his relationship with the BPO musicians could sometimes be "turbulent", but also "never destructively so".

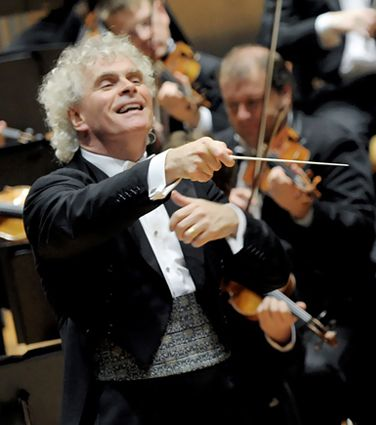
Rattle conducting the Berlin Philharmonic Orchestra in 2006

In 2006, a new controversy began in the German press as to the quality of Rattle's concerts with the Berlin Philharmonic, with criticism from the German critic Manuel Brug in Die Welt. One musician who wrote to the press to defend Rattle was the pianist Alfred Brendel. In 2007, the BPO/Rattle recording of Brahms's Ein deutsches Requiem received the Classic FM Gramophone best choral disc award.

Rattle was originally contracted to lead the BPO until 2012, but in April 2008 the BPO musicians voted to extend his contract as chief conductor for an additional ten years past the next season, to 2018. In January 2013, he announced his scheduled departure from the Berlin Philharmonic at the close of the 2017–2018 season. His final Berlin Philharmonic concert as chief conductor was at the Waldbühne on 24 June 2018.

UNICEF appointed Rattle and the BPO as Goodwill Ambassadors in November 2007. He is a patron of the Elton John AIDS Foundation.

=== Conducting in North America ===
Rattle made his North American debut in 1976, conducting the London Schools Symphony Orchestra at the Hollywood Bowl. He first conducted the Los Angeles Philharmonic in 1979 during the music directorship of Carlo Maria Giulini, and was their principal guest conductor from 1981 to 1994. He has also guest-conducted the Cleveland Orchestra, Chicago Symphony Orchestra, San Francisco Symphony, Toronto Symphony Orchestra and Boston Symphony Orchestra. His New York City debut was with the Los Angeles Philharmonic in 1985. In 2000, Rattle was the music director of the Ojai Music Festival.

In 1993, Rattle made his conducting debut with the Philadelphia Orchestra. He returned for guest conducting engagements in 1999 and 2000. The musical relationship between Rattle and the Philadelphia Orchestra was reported to be such that Philadelphia wanted to hire Rattle as its next music director after Wolfgang Sawallisch, but Rattle declined. Rattle has continued to guest-conduct the Philadelphia Orchestra, including appearances in 2006 and the Philadelphia Orchestra's first performances of Robert Schumann's cantata Das Paradies und die Peri in November 2007.

=== London Symphony Orchestra ===
In March 2015, the London Symphony Orchestra (LSO) announced the appointment of Rattle as its next music director, effective with the 2017–2018 season, with an initial contract of five seasons. He has recorded commercially for the LSO Live label. In January 2021 the LSO announced an extension of his contract to 2023. Rattle stood down as music director of the LSO at the close of the 2022–2023 season, and now has the title of Conductor Emeritus with the LSO for life. His last LSO performance came on 27 August at the BBC Proms, conducting Mahler's Symphony No. 9.

=== Bavarian Radio Symphony Orchestra and subsequent career ===
In 2010, Rattle first guest-conducted the Bavarian Radio Symphony Orchestra (BRSO). In January 2021, the BRSO announced the appointment of Rattle as its next chief conductor, effective with the 2023–2024 season, with an initial contract of five years. In October 2026, the BRSO announced an extension of Rattle's contract as chief conductor to 2033.

In 2019, Rattle first guest-conducted the Czech Philharmonic. In February 2024, the Czech Philharmonic announced the appointment of Rattle as its next principal guest conductor, effective with the 2024–2025 season, for a period of five years, with the title of 'Rafael Kubelík Conducting Chair'. In March 2026, the Staatskapelle Berlin bestowed the title of Ehrendirigent ('Honorary Conductor') upon Rattle.

== Awards ==
- 1987 New Year Honours, Commander of the British Empire (CBE)
- 1994 Birthday Honours, Knight Bachelor
- 1996 Shakespeare Prize by the Alfred Toepfer Foundation
- 2000 Royal Philharmonic Society Gold Medallists
- 2009 Gold Gloria Artis Medal for Merit to Culture
- 2010 Chevalier de la Légion d'honneur
- 2012 Wolf Prize in Arts Laureate in Music
- 2012 Gramophone Hall of Fame
- 2013 Léonie Sonning Music Prize
- 2014 New Year Honours, Member of the Order of Merit (OM)
- 2016 Helpmann Award, Best Orchestral Concert of the Year
- 2022 Knight Commander's Cross of the Order of Merit of the Federal Republic of Germany
- 2025 Ernst von Siemens Music Prize
- 2026 Bavarian Maximilian Order for Science and Art

== Musical styles and recordings ==
Rattle has conducted a wide variety of music, including some with period instruments (either actual surviving historical musical instruments or modernly made ones informed by commonly used designs and material of the time), but he is best known for his interpretations of late 19th- and early 20th-century composers such as Gustav Mahler, with a recording of Mahler's Second Symphony winning several awards on its release. He has also championed much contemporary music, an example of this being the 1996 TV series Leaving Home, where he presents a 7-part survey of musical styles and conductors with excerpts recorded by the CBSO.

Other recordings in Berlin have included Dvořák tone poems, Mahler's Symphony No. 9 and Claude Debussy's La Mer. The Gramophone Magazine praised the latter as a "magnificent disc" and drew favourable comparisons with interpretations of the piece by Rattle's immediate predecessors, Claudio Abbado and Herbert von Karajan. He has also worked with the Toronto Children's Chorus. Rattle and the BPO also recorded Gustav Holst's The Planets (EMI Classics), which was the BBC Music Magazine Orchestra Choice. In addition, Rattle's acclaimed complete 1989 recording of George Gershwin's opera Porgy and Bess was used as the soundtrack for the equally acclaimed 1993 television production of the work. It was the first made-for-television production of Porgy and Bess ever presented. Rattle's 2007 recording of Johannes Brahms's Ein deutsches Requiem received praise from BBC Music Magazine, as "Disc of the Month" for April 2007, "as probably the best new version of the Requiem I've heard in quite some years". Rattle and the BPO have also released recordings of Anton Bruckner's Fourth Symphony (Romantic), and Joseph Haydn's Symphonies Nos. 88, 89, 90, 91, 92 and Sinfonia Concertante.

Rattle's recording of Brahms's Ein deutsches Requiem with the BPO received the Choral Performance Grammy Award in 2008. He has won two other Grammy Awards, one Choral Performance Award for a recording of Stravinsky's Symphony of Psalms in 2007, and another for Best Orchestral Performance for a recording of Mahler's unfinished Symphony No. 10 in 2000.

== Personal life ==
Rattle's first marriage was to Elise Ross, an American soprano, with whom he had two sons: Sacha, who is a clarinettist, and Eliot, who is a painter. They divorced in 1995 after 15 years of marriage. In 1996, he married his second wife, Candace Allen, a US-born writer. This second marriage ended in 2004, and in 2008 Rattle married the Czech mezzo-soprano Magdalena Kožená. The couple live in Berlin and have two sons and a daughter.

Rattle is a member of the Incorporated Society of Musicians and a fan of Liverpool Football Club.

Rattle announced in January 2021 that he had applied for German citizenship, describing it as "an absolute necessity" for him to continue to work freely around the EU after Brexit.
