= Campioni =

Campioni may refer to:

- Campioni (surname)
- Neodythemis campioni, a species of dragonfly
