= Adagio in B minor (Mozart) =

1788 piano composition by W. A. Mozart

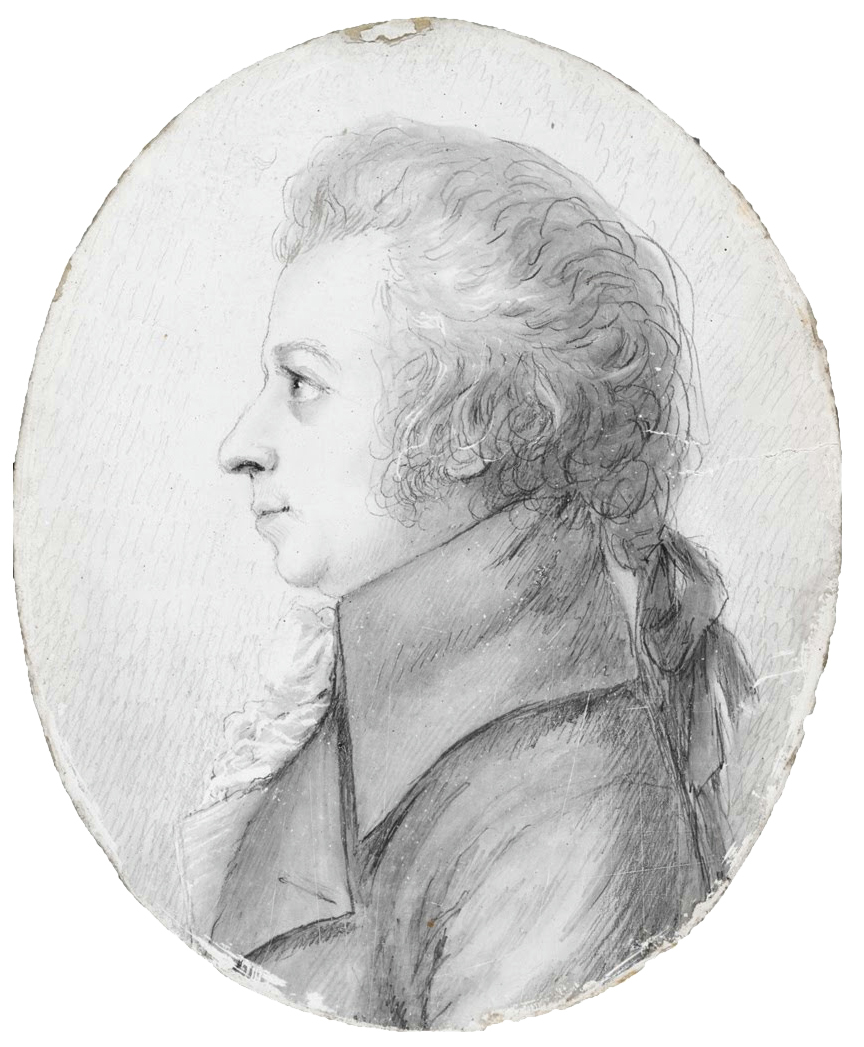
Stock's 1789 miniature of Mozart

The Adagio in B minor, K. 540, is a composition for piano solo by Wolfgang Amadeus Mozart. He entered it into his Verzeichnis aller meiner Werke (Catalogue of all my Works) on 19 March 1788.

At 57 measures, the duration of the piece is largely based on the performer's interpretation, including the decision of whether to do both repeats; it may last between 5 1/2 and 16 minutes. The key of B minor is very rare in Mozart's compositions; it is used in only one other instrumental work, the slow movement from the Flute Quartet No. 1 in D major, K. 285. Mozart specifically noted the key of B minor in his catalogue, which he did for no other piece.

In 1841 Franz Xaver Wolfgang Mozart used themes from this composition in his own Fest-Chor.

The Austrian composer and academic Gerhard Präsent has made an arrangement for string quartet in four movements Fantasy Quartet in D in which this piece acts as the third one.

The autograph is at the Stiftelsen Musikkulturens Främjande Library, Stockholm.
