= False ending =

Technique in film and music

A false ending is a device in film and music that can be used to temporarily lead the audience to believe that the work has ended before it continues.

== Film ==
In The Lord of the Rings: The Return of the King, director Peter Jackson presents a series of concluding scenes after the film's climax, several of which have been described as false endings. In The Simpsons Movie, the screen fades out at an apparent climax and displays "To be continued", followed by "Immediately." In Everything Everywhere All at Once, the words "The End" and a short sequence of fake credits appear after Evelyn seemingly dies. The film then reveals that the preceding events are being watched as a movie in an alternate universe.

== Music ==
False endings are a known device in classical music. Josef Haydn was fond of them, for example inducing applause at the wrong place in the finales of his String Quartet, Op. 33 No. 2 (nicknamed "The Joke") and Symphony No. 90.

False endings also appear in popular music. The Beatles used the device in songs including "I'm Only Sleeping", "Hello, Goodbye", and "Strawberry Fields Forever". Other examples include Guns N' Roses' "November Rain", Foo Fighters' "Come Back", and Beastie Boys' "Sabotage".

== See also ==
- Cliffhanger
