= Felici =

Felici is an Italian surname. Notable people with the surname include:

- Alessandro Felici (1742–1772), Italian composer and violinist
- Angelo Felici (1919–2007), cardinal of the Roman Catholic Church
- Antonio Felici (born 1968), Italian journalist and writer
- Emanuela Felici (born 1980), Sammarinese sport shooter
- Ettore Felici (1881–1951), second Apostolic Nuncio to Ireland
- Mattia Felici (born 2001), Italian football player
- Pericle Felici (1911–1982), cardinal of the Catholic Church
- Bartolomeo Felici (1695–1776), Italian composer
