= Giuseppe Cambini =

Italian composer

Giuseppe Maria Gioacchino Cambini (February 13, 1746, Livorno—1825, Le Kremlin-Bicêtre) was an Italian composer and violinist. He wrote over 80 symphony concertantes and 14 stage works, but only 2, Le tuteur avare and La statue have survived.

== Life ==
=== Unconfirmed information ===
Information about his life is scarcely traceable. Louis-Gabriel Michaud, French scholar and François-Joseph Fétis, Belgian musicologist, drafted his biography, and Cambini himself speaks about his past in an article published in Allgemeine musikalische Zeitung in 1804. However, all of these documents are full of errors and, therefore, need to be verified. It is not possible to confirm his personal data (only Fétis indicates his date of birth), nor his first studies. It is possible he is connected in some way to father Giovanni Battista Martini, and, more possibly to Filippo Manfredi, who was almost certainly his violin teacher. Fétis wrote about his unfortunate operatic debut in Naples in 1766, after which, during his return to Livorno by the sea, Cambini was kidnapped by pirates, who treated him terribly until his liberation by a Venetian aristocrat. The narration by the Belgian holds much resemblance to a story in the poetic periodical Correspondance littéraire, philosophique et critique, a fact that reduces its reliability. In the article found in Allgemeine musikalische Zeitung in 1804, Cambini claims to have played the viola in a string quartet with Luigi Boccherini, Pietro Nardini and his teacher Manfredi for six months in 1767. If what he says is true, this quartet would represent the first formation of this emerging genre in Italy, if not in all of Europe. For many years, this information fostered a gigantic legend about the importance of the role of Cambini in defining the string quartet. Actually, he was one of the many (even if one of the most prolific) who, in the same period, contributed to the development of the genre.

=== First years in Paris ===
The first information that we have that is certain is his arrival in Paris at the beginning of the 1770s, where he remained for 20 years, and composed oratorios, concert compositions, as well as chamber, symphonic, and theatrical compositions (there are almost 14 operas, of which at least 12 were performed in Paris. In addition, there are some ballets that aroused the admiration of Christoph Willibald Gluck), and he performed his violin concertos (during the Concert Spirituel and the Concerts des Amateurs, managed by François-Joseph Gossec). More than 600 compositions were published with his name in the French capital until 1800 (above all by the Venier, Berault and Sieber publishers, see also the section Sources), of which more than 80 are symphonies concertante (he wrote more of these than any other French composer of the time, becoming a champion of the genre).

=== Polemic with Mozart ===
His success in composing for the sinfonia concertante genre inspired the rivalry of Wolfgang Amadeus Mozart, who in 1778 accused Cambini of having obstructed the performance of his Sinfonia Concertante for Four Winds KV 297b at the Concert Spirituel, because Cambini was jealous of its perfection. The skepticism with regard to Cambini is not observed from any other composer who dealt with him. Conversely, Gluck, in the same years, often recommended him as an upstanding and honest man. Therefore, it is probable that the Salisburg expressed exaggerated feelings toward Cambini.

=== Alternating Parisian fame ===
The accusation by Mozart is not especially valid partially because the power of Cambini in Paris did not reach the level that Mozart claimed. In fact, the musical press paid less than gratifying attention to Cambini's vast production. He was cited relatively few times in the contemporary critiques, and his career as a violinist is less appreciated than other contemporary soloists of the time. His greatest successes, as aforementioned, were the sinfonie concertanti and his quartets, which even Mozart praised. His easy style, attractive and brilliant, open only just enough to innovation, rendered him a sort of protector of the galant Parisian style, and many of his pieces were favorably accepted in London as well as in America (some actively participated in defining the so-called forma sonata), but his theatrical works, operas, were almost always torn to shreds. Moreover, from 1785 it was affirmed in France of the more complex Viennese style, to which he tried to awkwardly join, undermining his fame, and damaging his reputation in the press of the German area.

=== The Revolution ===
In 1788, he became manager of the Théâtre Beaujolais, and he worked there during the revolutionary turmoil until 1791. His endurance permitted continuity of a high-quality operatic offering even in the years of the Republic. During the time of the Terror, beginning in 1791, he directed the Théâtre Louvois, which due to the economic crisis caused by the war was forced to close in 1794. The crisis affected many, as well as the estate of Cambini, and it constrained him to find very different work opportunities. Beginning in 1794, he accepted a salary from the chemist and entrepreneur Armand Séguin, for whom he gave private concerts and composed more than 100 quartets. He composed revolutionary and patriotic anthems for the newborn Republic. He taught violin, voice and composition privately. In addition, he transcribed opera arias of other authors for any buyer. He accepted editorial commissions (in 1795, the editor Gavreaux asked him to attend to the reprinting of methods for violin by Francesco Geminiani, and in 1799 Nademann and Lobry hired him to edit one for flute).

=== Oblivion ===
At the beginning of the 1800s, Cambini signed contracts with periodicals and magazines, including the Allgemeine musikalische Zeitung and Tablettes de Polymne, which published his articles until 1811. From that moment, Cambini disappears without leaving any trace in any documents. Michaud affirms that he died in Holland in 1818, information that satisfies scholars and has a certain amount of credibility, while Fétis recounts his painful and tragic admission to a mental hospital in Bicêtre, where he was found dead in 1825.

== Sources ==
More than 600 works by Cambini are diffused throughout the world. More than 300 are printed editions, 250 are in manuscript copies, and about 100 are proven autographs. We have received only his instrumental music. In fact, only the music of Le Tuteur avare, written in collaboration with Pasquale Anfossi in 1787 (today preserved at the Bibliothèque Municipale de Lille) remains of his operas. For many years, there was a symphony that was considered to be his, but in reality it is by Joseph Martin Kraus for Boyer publishers. From 1784 to 1786, the publisher released the work of the then unknown Kraus under the name of the more famous Cambini in order to sell more copies, causing the misunderstanding of attribution, which was not resolved until 1989.

=== Autographs ===
All 100 known autographs are in the United States of America, at the Library of Congress in Washington D.C. and at the New York Public Library for the Performing Arts.

=== Manuscripts ===
The largest collection of manuscripts of Cambini's compositions is found in Prague, in the music history department of the National Czech Museum of Music. Following, in order of the number of preserved copies are: the Benediktinerstift der Bibliothek und Musikarchiv die Seitenstetten in Austria (the majority however are without a date), the Conservatorio Benedetto Marcello di Venezia (Torrefranca and Correr Collection), and the Biblioteca di Archeologia e Storia dell'Arte di Palazzo Venezia in Rome (Vessella Collection). Smaller Italian collections are in the Pasini Collections at the Conservatorio Luca Marenzio in Brescia, at the Conservatorio Cherubini of Florence, at the Conservatorio Paganini di Genoa, at the Biblioteca Estense di Mantova, at Casa Verdi in Milan, at the Conservatorio San Pietro a Majella in Naples, and at the Biblioteca Casanatese di Roma (Marefoschi Collection and more). The Musical Documentation Center of Tuscany preserve three manuscripts of single parts of other chamber music compositions in the Venturi Music Collection in Montecatini Terme. Cities around the world that preserve at least five manuscripts are: Basel (Universitätsbibliothek), Cheb (Státní okresní archiv), Keszthely (Helikon Kastélymúzeum Könyvtára), Leutkirch im Allgäu (Fürstlich Waldburg-Zeilsches Archiv), Lille (Bibliothèque Municipale), Lund (Universitetsbiblioteket), New Haven (Music Library at Yale University), Prague (Biblioteca Nazionale Ceca), Steinfurt (Fürst zu Bentheimsche Musikaliensammlung Burgsteinfurt Collection, managed by Westfälische Wilhelms-Universität within the Universitäts- und Landesbibliothek di Münster), Stockholm (Musik- och teaterbiblioteket) and Västerås (Stadsbibliotek).

=== Printed editions ===
The Conservatoire de Paris and the Bibliothèque Nationale de France are the institutions that preserve the majority of the printed editions during Cambini's life, followed by the British Library of London, the Rossijskaja Gosudarstvennaja Biblioteka of Moscow, the Fürst zu Bentheimsche Musikaliensammlung Burgsteinfurt of Steinfurt, the Gesellschaft der Musikfreunde of Vienna, the Biblioteca Nacional of Spain, the Kongelige Bibliotek of Copenhagen, the Biblioteca Estense of Modena, and the Biblioteca Nazionale Universitaria of Turin (in the Foà and Giordano collection).

== Compositions ==
=== Operas ===
- Les romans (ballet-héroïque, libretto by L.-C.-M. de Bonneval, 1776 at the Académie Royale de Musique of Paris)
- Rose et Carloman (comédie-héroïque, libretto by A.D. Dubreuil, 1779)
- La statue (comédie, libretto by M.-R. de Montalembert, 1784)
- La bergère de qualité (comédie, libretto by M.-R. de Montalembert, 1786)
- Le tuteur avare (opéra bouffon, libretto by J.-L. Gabiot de Salins, 1788)
- La croisée (comédie, 1788, Beaujolais)
- Colas et Colette (opéra bouffon, 1788, Beaujolais)
- Le bon père (opéra bouffon, libretto by J.-F. Le Pitre, 1788, Beaujolais)
- La prêtresse du soleil (drama, 1789, Beaujolais)
- La revanche, ou Les deux frères (comédie, libretto by P.U. Dubuisson, 1790, Beaujolais)
- Adèle et Edwin (opéra, 1790, Beaujolais)
- Nantilde et Dagobert (opéra, libretto di P.-A.-A. de Piis, 1791, Louvois)
- Les trois Gascons (opéra, libretto by Cambini, 1793, Louvois)
- Encore un tuteur dupé (comédie, libretto by P.-J.-A. Roussel, 1798, Montansier)

=== Doubted attribution ===
- Alcméon (tragédie lyrique, libretto by A.D. Dubreuil, 1782, never performed)
- Alcide (opéra, libretto by A.D. Dubreuil, 1782, never performed)
- L'Amour et la peur, ou L'amant forcé d'être fidèle (opéra-comique, libretto by Cambini, 1795)

=== Sacred music ===
- Le sacrifice d'Isaac (French oratorio, 1774)
- Joad (French oratorio, 1775)
- Samson (oratorio, libretto by Voltaire, 1779; lost)
- Le sacrifice d'Abraham (oratorio, 1780; lost)
- 5 masses
- Miserere, motet à grand choeur (1775, lost)
- Some other motets

=== Anthems and revolutionary songs ===
- Hymne à l'être suprème (1794)
- Hymne à l'égalité (1794)
- Hymne à la Vertu (1794)
- Hymne à la Liberté (1794)
- Hymne à la Victoire (1794)
- Ode sur Bara et Viala (1794)
- Ode sur nos victoires (1794)
- Ronde Républicaine (1794)
- Le pas de charge républicain – Air de combat (1794)

=== Instrumental music ===
Trois quintetti concertans (Three Wind Quintets), c.1802, by Giuseppe Cambini; performed by the Soni Ventorum Wind Quintet, 1970
No. 1 in B♭ major
I. Allegro maestoso

II. Larghetto cantabile

III. Rondo Allegretto grazioso

No. 2 in D minor
I. Allegro espressivo

II. Larghetto sostenuto ma con moto

III. Presto ma non tanto

No. 3 in F major
I. Allegro maestoso

II. Larghetto sostenuto

III. Rondo Allegro con brio

- Concerto for viola and orchestra
- 3 symphonies for strings, 2 oboes and 2 horns, op.5 (1776)
- 3 symphonies à grand orchestre for strings, flute, 2 oboes, bassoon and 2 horns (1787)
- 3 symphonies for strings, 2 oboes and 2 horns (1788)
- 82 concert symphonies (of which 76 are published and 52 currently available)
- 110 quintets for 2 violins, viola, 2 violoncellos (maybe 114), of which 84 are complete (preserved at the Washington Library)
- 149 quartets for strings (1773-1809)
- At least 104 trios
- At least 212 duets
- 5 Quartets for harpsichord, violin, oboe and violoncello
- 6 sonatas for violino and bass
- Petits airs variés for violin
- 12 sonatas for flute and bass
- 6 sonatas for harpsichord/fortepiano and violin, op.21 (1781)
- Air de Marlborough avec variations for fortepiano/harpsichord and violin obbliged
- 6 sonate for harpsichord/fortepiano and flute
- Marche des Marseillois et la Carmagnole variées for flute and bass (1794)
- Variations sur le Hymne du siège de Lille (L'amour dans le coeur d'un Français) (1794) for two violins Variations sur le Hymne "Vos aimables fillettes" (1794) for two violins Variations sur Cadet Roussel (1794) for two violins
- Petits airs connus variés for flute and bass
- Air variés for flute, op.6
- Différens solfèges d'une difficulté graduelle (1783)

== Articles ==
- Nouvelle méthode théorique et pratique pour le violon (c. 1795)
- Méthode pour la flûte traversière suivie de vingt petits airs connus et six duo à l'usage des commençans (1799)
- Ausführung der Instrumentalquartetten, «Allgemeine musikalische Zeitung» (1803-1804)
- 2 articles in «Correspondance des professeurs et amateurs de musique» (1804)
- Über den Charakter, den die italienischen und deutschen Musik haben, und die französische haben sollte, «Allgemeine musikalische Zeitung» (1804-1805)
- 6 articles in Les tablettes de Polymnie (1810-1811)

== Recordings ==
Around 1936, the Quartet of Rome (Francesco Montelli and Oscar Zuccarini, violins; Aldo Perini, viola; Luigi Silva, violoncello), recorded Quartetto in Re maggiore by Cambini adapted by Fausto Torrefranca. The 78 rpm disc of the first publication are preserved at the Istituto centrale per i beni sonori e audiovisivi di Roma, and are digitalized on Internet Culturale.
