= Symphony No. 8 (Beethoven) =

1812 musical composition by Beethoven

- by Ludwig van Beethoven
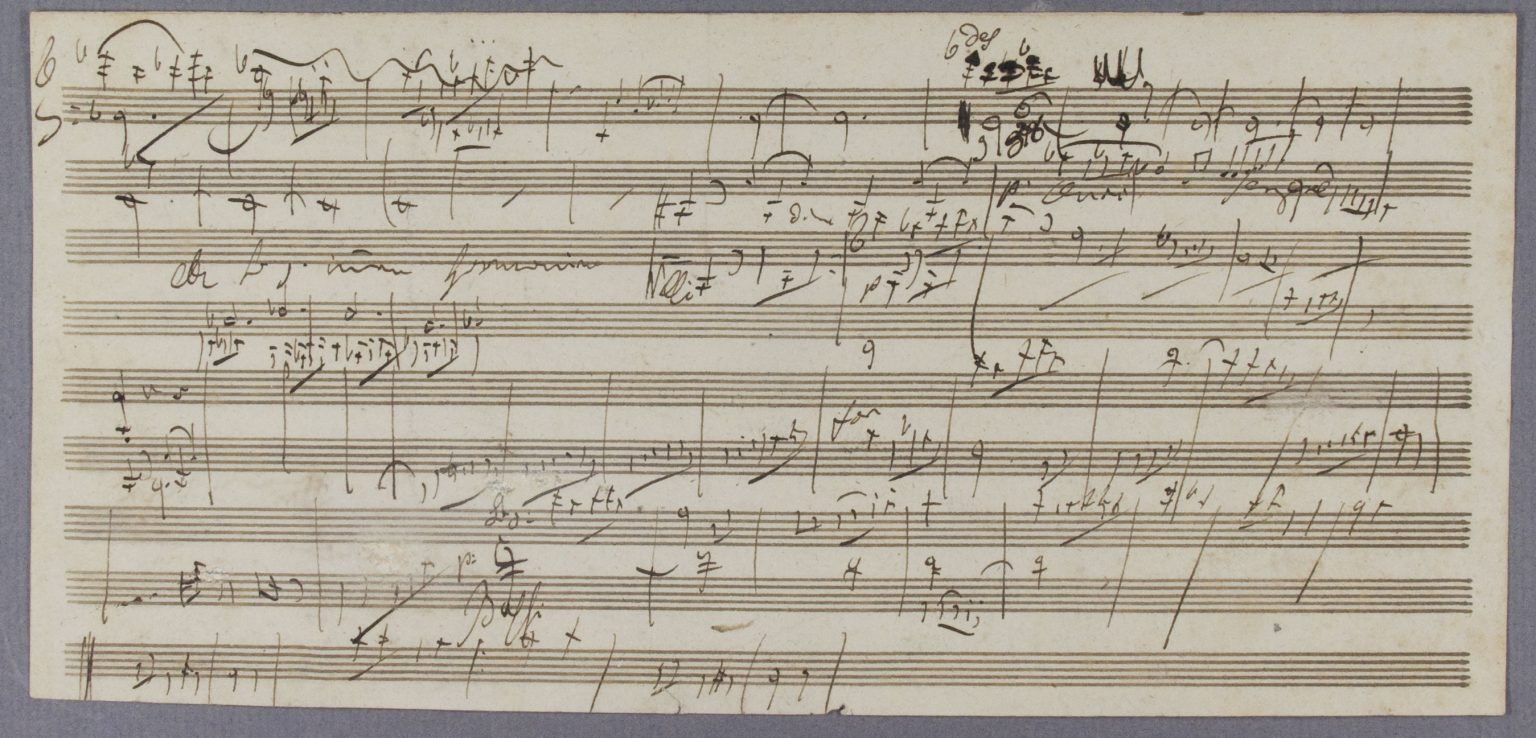
- A sketch for Symphony No. 8 from the Stiftelsen Musikkulturens Främjande
- Key: F major
- Opus: 93
- Period: Transition from the Classical to Romantic era
- Composed: 1812: Teplice
- Duration: c. 25 minutes
- Movements: 4
- Scoring: Orchestra

Premiere
- Date: 27 February 1814
- Location: Redoutensaal, Vienna
- Conductor: Ludwig van Beethoven

The Symphony No. 8 in F major, Op. 93, is a symphony in four movements composed by Ludwig van Beethoven in 1812 and his penultimate and shortest symphony. Beethoven fondly referred to it as "my little Symphony in F", distinguishing it from his Sixth Symphony, a longer work in the same key.

The Eighth Symphony is generally light-hearted, though not lightweight, and in many places loud, with many accented notes. Various passages in the symphony are heard by some listeners to be musical jokes. As with various other Beethoven works such as the Opus 27 piano sonatas and the later Ninth Symphony, the symphony deviates from Classical tradition in making the last movement the weightiest of the four.

== Composition, premiere and reception ==
The work was begun in the summer of 1812, immediately after the completion of the Seventh Symphony. Beethoven was 41 years old at the time. According to Antony Hopkins, the mood of the work betrays nothing of the events that were taking place in Beethoven's life at the time, which involved his interference in his brother Johann's romantic relationships. The work took Beethoven only four months to complete, and is, unlike many of his works, without dedication.

The premiere took place on 27 February 1814, at a concert in the Redoutensaal, Vienna, at which the Seventh Symphony (which had been premiered two months earlier) was also played. The concert also included Wellington's Victory and the premiere of Beethoven's song "Tremate, empi, tremate." Beethoven was growing increasingly deaf at the time, but nevertheless insisted on leading the premiere. Reportedly, "the orchestra largely ignored his ungainly gestures and followed the principal violinist instead."

When asked by his pupil Carl Czerny why the Eighth was less popular than the Seventh, Beethoven is said to have replied, "because the Eighth is so much better." A critic wrote that "the applause it received was not accompanied by that enthusiasm which distinguishes a work which gives universal delight; in short—as the Italians say—it did not create a furor." According to Czerny, Beethoven was angered by this reception. George Bernard Shaw, in his capacity as a music critic, agreed with Beethoven's assessment of the work, writing that "In all subtler respects the Eighth is better [than the Seventh]." More recently, Jan Swafford has described the Eighth as "a beautiful, brief, ironic look backward to Haydn and Mozart." Martin Geck has commented on the authenticity of the Eighth, noting that it contains "all the relevant hallmarks, including motivic and thematic writing notable for its advanced planning, defiant counterpoint, furious cross-rhythms, sudden shifts from piano to forte, and idyllic and even hymnlike episodes."

== Form ==
The symphony has four movements:

1. Allegro vivace e con brio (F major)
2. Allegretto scherzando (B♭ major)
3. Tempo di menuetto (F major)
4. Allegro vivace (F major)

The symphony is scored for two flutes, two oboes, two clarinets in B♭, two bassoons, two horns in F (in B♭ basso for the second movement), two trumpets in F, timpani, and strings.

It is approximately 25 minutes in duration.

=== I. Allegro vivace e con brio ===
I. Allegro vivace e con brio
All movements performed by the Bucharest College Orchestra

This movement is in the home key of F major and is in fast 3/4 time. As with most of Beethoven's first movements of this period, it is written in sonata form, including a fairly substantial coda. The opening theme is in three sections of four bars each, with the pattern forte–piano–forte.

At the onset of the recapitulation, the theme is made more emphatic by omitting the middle four bars. Hopkins observed that the movement is slightly unusual among Beethoven's works in that it reaches its dramatic climax not during the development section, but at the onset of the recapitulation. The concluding bars of the development form a huge crescendo and the return of the opening bars is marked fff (fortississimo, i.e. extremely loud), which rarely appears in Beethoven's works, but has precedents in the Seventh Symphony. This is balanced by the quiet closing measures of the movement.

According to Dutch musicologist Cees Nieuwenhuizen, Beethoven may have originally envisioned this movement as a piano concerto first movement.

=== II. Allegretto scherzando ===
II. Allegretto scherzando quasi andante

There is a widespread belief that this movement is an affectionate parody of the metronome, which had only recently been invented (or more accurately, merely improved) by Beethoven's friend, Johann Maelzel. Specifically the belief was that the movement was based on a canon called "Ta ta ta... Lieber Maelzel," WoO 162, said to have been improvised at a dinner party in Maelzel's honor in 1812. However, there is no evidence corroborating this story and it is likely that WoO 162 was not written by Beethoven but was constructed after-the-fact by Anton Schindler. A more likely inspiration was the similar rhythmic parody of Joseph Haydn's "Clock" Symphony.

The movement marks the first time Beethoven used the tempo scherzando in his slow movements, though he has used allegretto in his Seventh Symphony. It begins with even staccato chords in 16th-notes (semiquavers) played by the wind instruments, and a basic 16th-note rhythm continues steadily through the piece. The second subject includes a motif of very rapid sixty-fourth notes. This motif is played by the whole orchestra at the end of the coda.

The key is B♭ major, the subdominant of F, and the organization is what Charles Rosen has called "slow movement sonata form"; that is, at the end of the exposition there is no development section, but only a simple modulation back to B♭ for the recapitulation; this also may be described as sonatina form.

=== III. Tempo di menuetto ===
III. Tempo di menuetto

The style of Beethoven's minuet is not particularly close to its 18th-century predecessors, as it retains a rather coarse, thumping rhythm; such as how after the initial upbeat Beethoven places the dynamic indication sforzando (sf) on each of the next five beats. This makes the minuet stylistically close to the other movements of the symphony, which likewise rely often on good-humored, thumping accents.

The minuet is written in ternary form, with a contrasting trio section containing prized solos for horns and clarinet. Igor Stravinsky praised the "incomparable instrumental thought" shown in Beethoven's orchestration of the trio section.

=== IV. Allegro vivace ===
IV. Allegro vivace

The most substantial movement in the symphony, the finale is in sonata rondo form with a fast tempo. The metronome marking supplied by Beethoven himself is whole note = 84. This is the first symphonic movement in which the timpani are tuned in octaves, foreshadowing the similar octave-F tuning in the scherzo of the Ninth Symphony. Hopkins quoted the entire opening theme of the finale "in order to emphasize the outrageous impropriety of the last roaring C-sharp":

"All that precedes it is so delicate in texture, so nimble and light-footed." Donald Tovey cites the abrupt intrusion of the C-sharp as an example of Beethoven's "long-distance harmonic effects". This "rogue" note is eventually revealed as having an architectural function in the structure of the movement as a whole. The opening material reappears three times: at the start of the development section, the start of the recapitulation, and about halfway through the coda. As in the first movement, the move to the second subject first adopts the "wrong" key, then moves to the normal key (exposition: dominant, recapitulation: tonic) after a few measures.

The coda is one of the most elaborate in all of Beethoven's works. Hopkins called it "magnificent" and suggests it is too substantial to be referred to by the term "coda". It contains two particularly striking events. The loud and startling C♯ from the opening finally gets an "explanation": "and now it appears that Beethoven has held that note in reserve, wherewith to batter at the door of some immensely distant key. Out bursts the theme then, in F sharp minor."

A few measures later, there is a stunning modulation in which this key is "hammered down" by a semitone, arriving instantaneously at the home key of F major.

The symphony ends with a very long passage of loud tonic harmony. Tchaikovsky called this movement "One of the greatest symphonic masterpieces of Beethoven."

== Recordings ==
Of the recording by Charles Mackerras with the Scottish Chamber Orchestra, Richard Osborne wrote in Gramophone: "If I had to single out one performance from the set, it would be that of the Eighth. This is very much Mackerras’s kind of music: witty, original, rich in surprise, intensively alive, and a good deal more substantial than that old sobriquet “Little” would have us believe. Beethoven conducting and playing don’t come much better than this." Gerald Fenech wrote: "I would agree with Richard Osborne who singles out the Eighth as the most satisfying of the cycle," describing Mackerras's Beethoven cycle overall as "one of the best around." Owen E. Walton described it as "a truly exceptional performance. Anyone knowing this work will hopefully have gathered from my previous comments that Mackerras’s general approach to Beethoven as evinced in this set is perfectly suited to the ‘little’ Eighth Symphony."

Tom Service, in The Guardian, listed those by John Eliot Gardiner, Nikolaus Harnoncourt, Colin Davis, Christian Thielemann, and Hans Pfitzner as "key recordings."

== Notes ==
=== References ===
- Hopkins, Antony (1981). The Nine Symphonies of Beethoven. Pan Macmillan. ISBN 0-330-26670-5.
- Rosen, Charles (1988). Sonata Forms (revised ed.). New York: Norton. ISBN 0-393-30219-9.
