= Étude Op. 10, No. 12 (Chopin) =

Étude written by Chopin

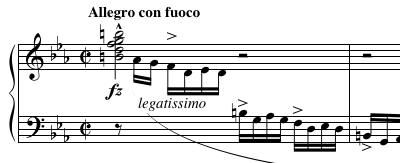
Opening of the Revolutionary Étude

Étude Op. 10, No. 12 in C minor, known as the "Revolutionary Étude" or the "Étude on the Bombardment of Warsaw", is a solo piano work by Frédéric Chopin written c. 1831, and the last in his first set, Études, Op. 10, dedicated "à son ami Franz Liszt" ("to his friend Franz Liszt"). The autographed edition is located in the archive of Stiftelsen Musikkulturens Främjande (The Nydahl Collection) in Stockholm.

== History ==
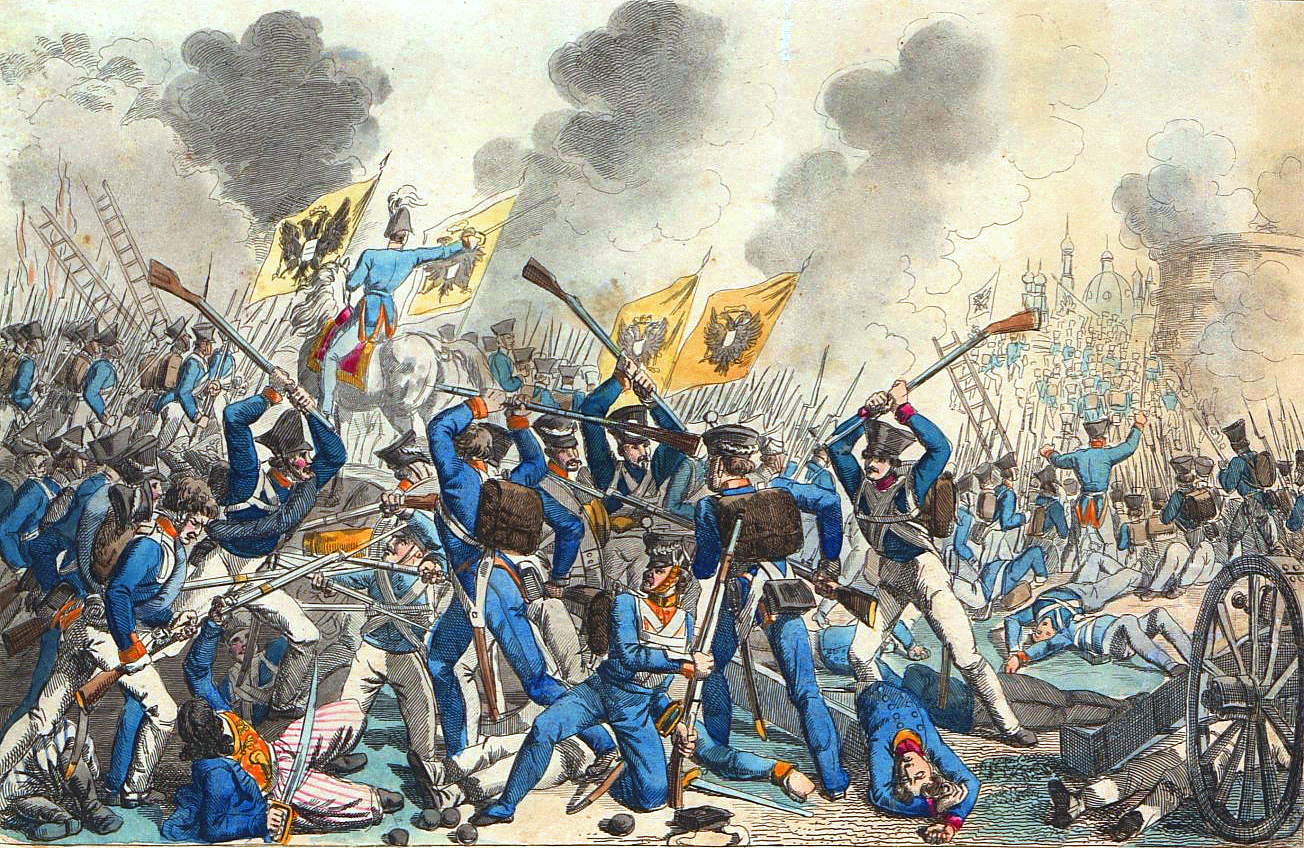
The 1831 Russian attack on Warsaw, which is apocryphally believed to have been the inspiration behind Chopin's "Revolutionary Étude"

Popular legend holds that Chopin was inspired to write the 12th Étude after the Battle of Warsaw in 1831 during the November Uprising in his native Poland. The piece did first appear around the same time as the November Uprising. Upon the conclusion of this battle, which marked the failure of the Polish rebellion against Russia, Chopin reportedly cried, "All this has caused me much pain. Who could have foreseen it?"

Unlike études of prior periods, which were designed primarily to emphasize and develop particular aspects of musical technique, the romantic études of composers such as Chopin and Liszt are fully developed concert pieces that reinforce the development of more robust technique.

== Technique and analysis ==
Étude No. 12
Performed by Edward Neeman

Revolutionary Etude
MIDI rendition

For Op. 10, No. 12, the technique required in the opening bars is executing long, loud descending runs, which form a dominant minor ninth chord that builds up to the main theme. The length and repetition of these rapid passages are distinctive. The rest of the passage focuses on the left hand fingering scales and arpeggios. The opening theme, in the right hand, is notable for its powerful chordal basis.

A primary challenge of Op. 10, No. 12 lies in the simultaneous playing of relentless left hand semiquavers while the RH shapes widely distributed octaves into legato melodic shapes.

The left hand technique in this piece involves evenly played semiquavers throughout. The structure is in Chopin's usual ternary form (A–B–A–coda). The opening arresting figuration transitions into the main appassionato melody. The octave melody's upward ascending forte dotted rhythms and the continuous tumultuous LH accompaniment provide great drama with few moments of respite. The piece ends by recalling the opening in a final descending sweep (with both hands) descending to an F major chord, eventually cadencing on C major (tierce de Picardie).
