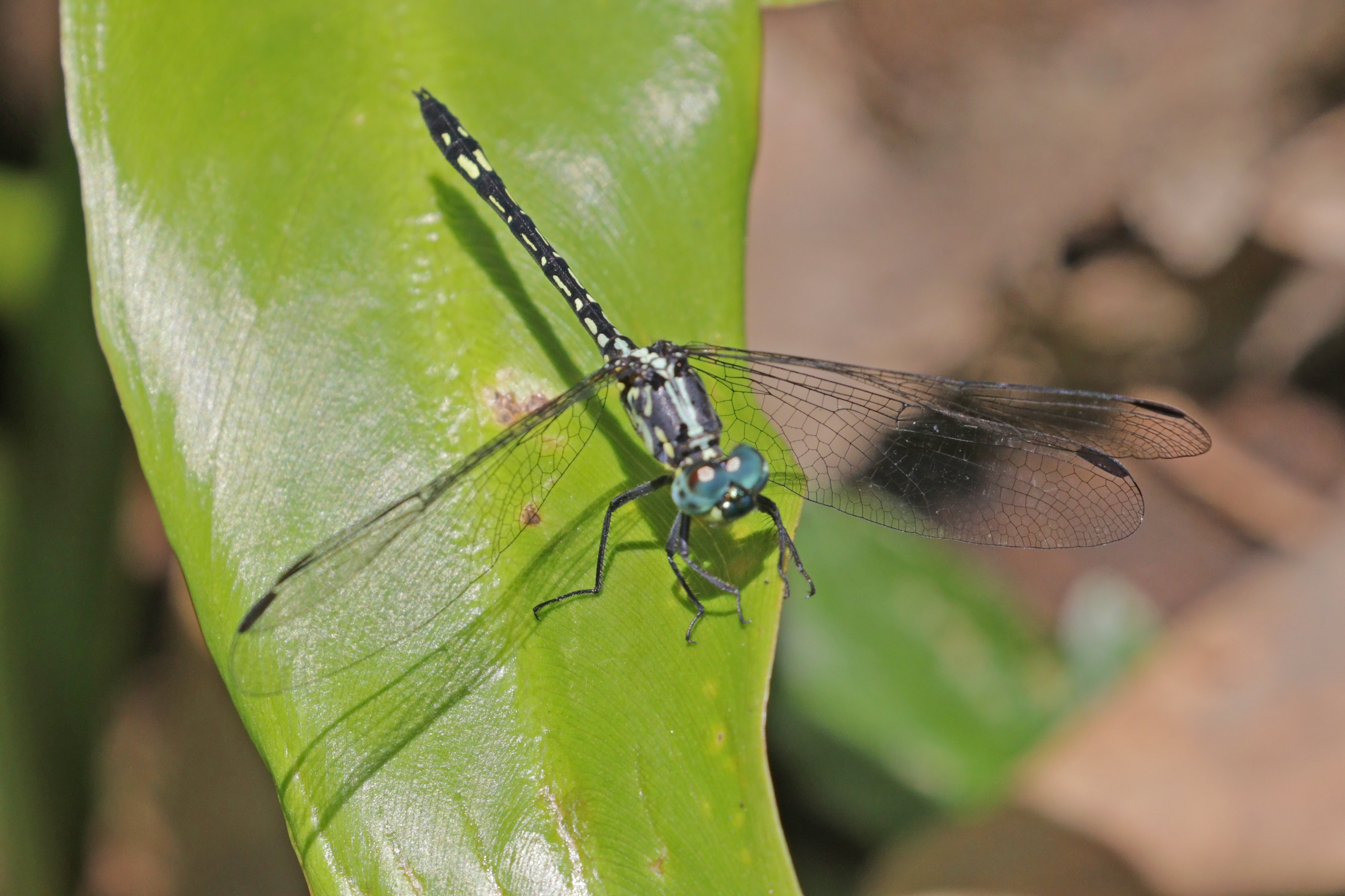
- N. hildebrandti, Madagascar
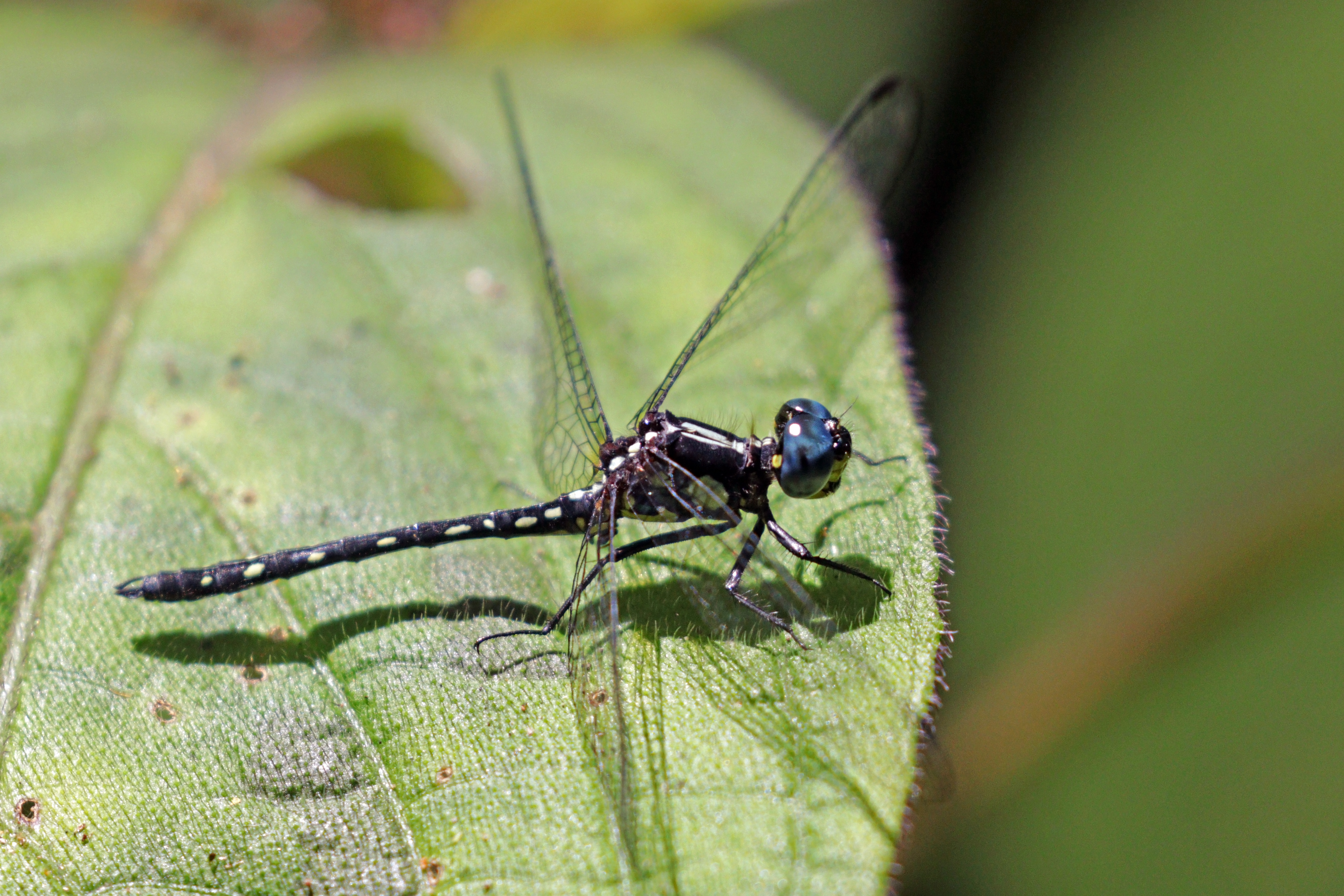
- N. pauliani, Madagascar

Scientific classification
- Kingdom: Animalia
- Phylum: Arthropoda
- Class: Insecta
- Order: Odonata
- Infraorder: Anisoptera
- Family: Libellulidae
- Subfamily: Tetrathemistinae
- Genus: Neodythemis; Karsch, 1889

= Neodythemis =

Genus of dragonflies

Neodythemis is a genus of dragonfly in the family Libellulidae, known as junglewatchers. It contains the following species:

- Neodythemis afra (Ris, 1909)
- Neodythemis arnoulti Fraser, 1955
- Neodythemis campioni (Ris, 1915)
- Neodythemis fitzgeraldi Pinhey, 1961 – Powdered Junglewatcher
- Neodythemis hildebrandti Karsch, 1889
- Neodythemis infra Dijkstra, Diedericks & Mézière, 2015 – Blackwater Junglewatcher
- Neodythemis katanga Dijkstra & Kipping, 2015 – Katanga Junglewatcher
- Neodythemis klingi (Karsch, 1890)
- Neodythemis munyaga Dijkstra & Vick, 2006
- Neodythemis nyungwe Dijkstra & Vick, 2006
- Neodythemis pauliani Fraser, 1952
- Neodythemis preussi (Karsch, 1891)
- Neodythemis scalarum Pinhey, 1964
- Neodythemis takamandensis (Vick, 2000) – Bizarre Junglewatcher
- Neodythemis trinervulata (Martin, 1902)
