= Neodythemis preussi =

Conservation status
- Least Concern (IUCN 3.1)

Scientific classification
- Kingdom: Animalia
- Phylum: Arthropoda
- Class: Insecta
- Order: Odonata
- Infraorder: Anisoptera
- Family: Libellulidae
- Genus: Neodythemis
- Species: N. preussi

Binomial name
- Neodythemis preussi (Karsch, 1891)

Species of dragonfly

Neodythemis preussi is a species of dragonfly in the family Libellulidae. It is found in Cameroon, the Democratic Republic of the Congo, Equatorial Guinea, Gabon, Nigeria, Uganda, and Zambia. Its natural habitat is subtropical or tropical moist lowland forests.
