= Tremate, empi, tremate =

1803 vocal trio by Ludwig van Beethoven

- Song by Ludwig van Beethoven
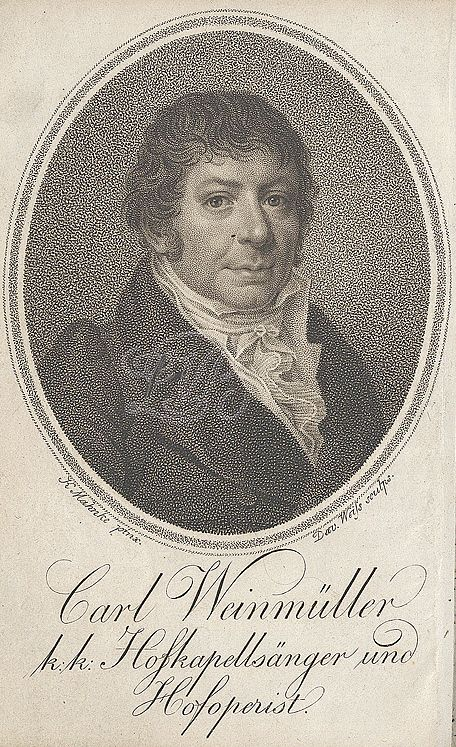
- Carl Weinmüller sang the bass part in the premiere.
- English: Tremble, ye impious, tremble!
- Key: B♭ major/E♭ major
- Opus: 116
- Text: Giovanni de Gamerra
- Language: Italian
- Performed: 27 February 1814: Vienna
- Scoring: soprano, tenor, bass and orchestra

"Tremate, empi, tremate", Op. 116, is a vocal trio composed by Ludwig van Beethoven for soprano, tenor and bass vocalists with orchestral accompaniment. It was written in 1802 and was completed by early 1803, while Beethoven was a student of Antonio Salieri. It was composed as an exercise in setting Italian texts in preparation for being able to write ensembles in opera. The text of the song was written by Giovanni de Gamerra.

"Tremate, empi, tremate" did not have its premiere until a concert on 27 February 1814 in Vienna, at which Beethoven's Symphony No. 8 in F major was also premiered, and Beethoven's Symphony No. 7 in A major and Wellington's Victory were also performed after having had their premieres the previous December. At the premiere, the soprano part was taken by Anna Milder-Hauptmann, the tenor part was taken by Giuseppe Siboni and the bass part was taken by Carl Weinmüller. Later in 1814, Milder-Hauptmann and Weinmüller originated the roles of Leonore and Rocco, respectively, in the premiere performance of Beethoven's revised opera Fidelio. Milder-Hauptmann had also originated the role of Leonore in Beethoven's original version of the opera in 1805. The trio was later performed at a concert in Vienna on 23 May 1824, at which Beethoven's Symphony No. 9 in D minor, Kyrie from Missa Solemnis, and Consecration of the House overture were also performed. At this concert, Geronima Dardanelli sang the soprano part, Domenico Donzelli sang the tenor role and Pio Botticelli sang the bass part.

The trio is in three sections. The first section has a tempo of allegro and is in the key of B♭ major. The section starts with a "spirited" vocal by the bass on the verse "tremate, empi, tremate/dell' ire mie severe/su quelle fronti altere/il fulmine cadra" (Tremble, ye impious, tremble!/My stern wrath/Shall strike like a thunderbolt/Upon those haughty brows). The soprano and tenor then sing their lines in a calmer melody before the bass returns in the more vigorous style he began the song with. The second section is andante in E♭ major and resembles some of Mozart's andante music. The key returns to B♭ major for the final section, which is marked allegro assai.
