= Neodythemis afra =

Conservation status
- Least Concern (IUCN 3.1)

Scientific classification
- Kingdom: Animalia
- Phylum: Arthropoda
- Class: Insecta
- Order: Odonata
- Infraorder: Anisoptera
- Family: Libellulidae
- Genus: Neodythemis
- Species: N. afra

Binomial name
- Neodythemis afra (Ris, 1909)

Synonyms
- Micromacromia afra Ris, 1909; Neodythemis africana Fraser, 1954; Neodythemis gorillae Pinhey, 1961

Species of dragonfly

Neodythemis afra is a species of dragonfly in the family Libellulidae. It is found in Cameroon, Central African Republic, the Republic of the Congo, the Democratic Republic of the Congo, Nigeria, and Uganda. Its natural habitat is subtropical or tropical moist lowland forests.
