= Campioni (surname) =

Campioni is an Italian surname.

== Geographical distribution ==
As of 2014, 60.5% of all known bearers of the surname Campioni were residents of Italy (frequency 1:27,915), 24.4% of Brazil (1:231,611), 5.0% of France (1:369,486), 2.6% of the United States (1:3,802,645), 2.0% of Argentina (1:602,021), 1.4% of Germany (1:1,604,573), 1.0% of Belgium (1:328,497) and 1.0% of Canada (1:1,051,372).

In Italy, the frequency of the surname was higher than national average (1:27,915) in the following regions:

1. Tuscany (1:6,160)
2. Lazio (1:7,631)
3. Marche (1:11,470)
4. Umbria (1:16,439)
5. Emilia-Romagna (1:20,664)
6. Veneto (1:23,676)

== People ==
- Carlo Antonio Campioni (1720–1788), also known as Carlo Antonio Campione and as Charles Antoine Campion, an Italian composer and collector of early music
- Inigo Campioni (1878–1944), an Italian admiral
- Joop Campioni (1901–1962), also known as Marie Johannes Jacobus Campioni, a Dutch football (soccer) player
