= Alessandro Felici =

Italian composer

Alessandro Felici (21 November 1742 – 21 August 1772) was an Italian composer and violinist, not to be confused with his contemporary, Roman composer Felice Alessandri.

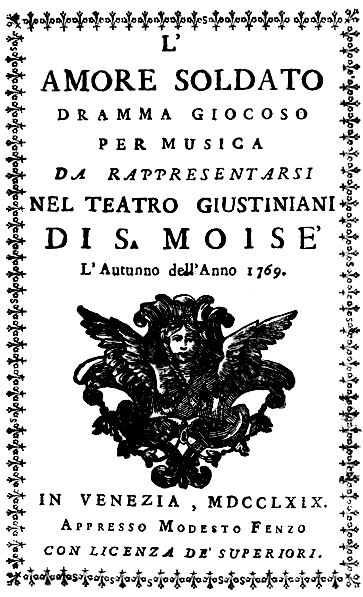
Frontpage of the libretto of the opera L'amore soldato composed by Felici in 1769 as conserved in the International Museum and Music Library in Bologna

== Life ==
Alessandro Felici was born in Florence, Italy on 21 November 1742. His father was Bartolomeo Felici, Kapellmeister of the Florentine church of San Marco. Bartolomeo taught his son how to play the organ and music composition. By the time he was 14 years old, he was already well known in Florence for his virtuosity on the harpsichord and organ. From 1756 to 1764 he studied the violin with Giuseppe Castrucci. He showed interest in composing for the theater, and in 1765 his father sent him to Naples, the Italian city known for its bustling opera scene. In Naples, he studied dramatic theater with Gennaro Manna.

Felici returned to Florence in 1767 where he jointed the teaching staff of the music school run by his father. He began composing his own operas, distinguished as being much more cuttingly expressive than the works of his contemporaries (anticipating the romantic period), which guaranteed his immediate and notable success. We know of more than ten theatrical works, not only performed in Florence but also in Rome, Venice, Turin, Milan, and even as far as Madrid and Leipzig. In 1769, his opera entitled Apollo in Tessaglia inaugurated the concerts of the Ingegnosi Academy.

Felici was also engaged in composing sacred and instrumental music, of which the keyboard pieces stand out: they shaped the modern conception of the concert as well as sonate composed in the same time in London and Vienna: his works for harpsichord, as observed by Fausto Torrefranca, anticipate some themes of Mozart and Clementi. Simultaneously, he devoted himself to teaching organ and composition at his father's music school. Their most celebrated student was the famous opera composer, Luigi Cherubini.

Felici's career was unexpectedly interrupted by tuberculosis, which was the cause of his death on 21 August 1772 in Florence at the young age of twenty-nine. His only critic was marquis Eugène de Ligniville, who wrote in a letter to Giovanni Battista Martini that his hunting dog knew more about counterpoint than Felici.

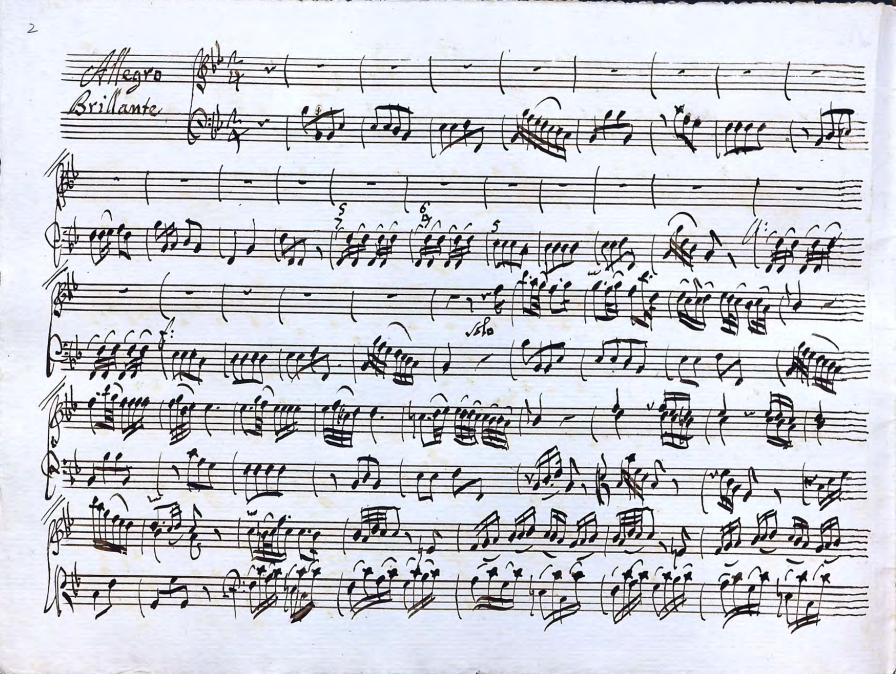
First page of soloist's part of the Concerto per cembalo, violini obbligati, corni da caccia, viola e basso in B flat major, composed by Felici. Manuscripts dated 1770 in Fondo Ricasoli at University of Louisville, Kentucky

== Sources ==
Little is left of his musical production. We have the musical scores of only one of his operas, L'amore soldato (performed in Venice in 1769), in various different types of copies (even manuscripts from the 1900s) found in libraries in Dresden (Sächsische Landesbibliothek/Staats- und Universitätsbibliothek), Vienna (Österreichische Nationalbibliothek), Budapest (Országos Széchényi Könyvtár) and Washington (Library of Congress). Contemporary handwritten manuscripts of his sacred and secular works (concerts, sonatas for harpsichord, parts of operatic arias) are mostly conserved in Venice (in the Torrefranca Collection at the Benedetto Marcello Conservatory), and in Louisville (in the Ricasoli Collection at the University of Louisville).

Manuscripts that are attributed to Felici have been found in Pistoia (Musical Archive of the Pistoia Cathedral), Bologna (Conservatorio Giovanni Battista Martini), Florence (Luigi Cherubini Conservatory), and Siena (Cathedral Archive, Piccolomini Library and Metropolitan Opera). The Musical Documentation Center of Tuscany (Centro Documentazione Musicale della Toscana [it]) discovered works by Felici in the Venturi Music Collection in Montecatini Terme. The librettos of his operas are mostly conserved at the Conservatory in Florence, in the Florentine Marucelliana Library, in the International Museum and Music Library in Bologna, in the Giorgio Cini Foundation in Venice and in the Staatsbibliothek in Berlin.

== Recordings ==
In 1969 classical band Solisti Romani (Massimo Coen, Mario Baruffa, Luigi Lanzillotta), with Paola Bernardi playing the harpsichord, recorded the Concerto in F major for harpsichord by Felici in the Auditorium of the Discoteca di Stato in Rome. After being published in various forms (LP, CD), the recording was digitalized by the Italian Central Institute of Audio and Audiovisual Property on its own website.
