= Neodythemis campioni =

Conservation status
- Least Concern (IUCN 3.1)

Scientific classification
- Kingdom: Animalia
- Phylum: Arthropoda
- Class: Insecta
- Order: Odonata
- Infraorder: Anisoptera
- Family: Libellulidae
- Genus: Neodythemis
- Species: N. campioni

Binomial name
- Neodythemis campioni (Ris, 1915)

Synonyms
- Allorrhizucha campioni Ris, 1915

Species of dragonfly

Neodythemis campioni is a species of dragonfly in the family Libellulidae. It is found in Cameroon, Liberia, and Sierra Leone. Its natural habitats are subtropical or tropical moist lowland forests and rivers.
