= Venturi Music Collection =

The Venturi Music Collection (Italian: Fondo musicale Venturi, or Fondo Venturi) is a collection of musical documents housed at the Public Library in Montecatini Terme, Italy. It conserves many handwritten copies by composers who were active in the second half of the 1700s; for example, there are autographs, which are one of a kind, of composers from the Pistoia and Florence area.

== History ==
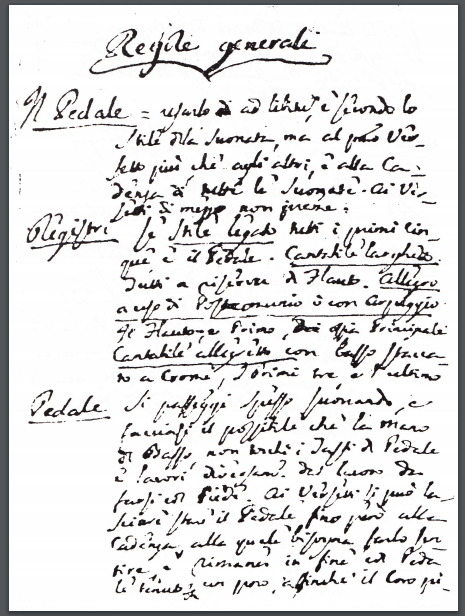
Manuscript from Regole generali anonymous, conserved by Pietro Sermolli, an example of a sole and unique piece conserved in the Venturi Music Collection

The Collection began with the private collection of the Sermolli family, a Tuscan nobile family that had bought musical manuscripts until the 1700s. In 1933, Antonio Venturi (1905-1981), teacher at Montecatini High School, musician, and collectionist, convinced Alessandro Pichi-Sermolli, who was on the verge of selling all of his belongings, to entrust him with the management of the musical documents.

Venturi united the Sermolli manuscripts with his own personal paper collection, bought from ragmen, originating from the Distanti Academy, running in Pistoia and Gavinana (San Marcello Pistoiese). For fifty years, Venturi was the only curator of the entire collection, to which over time he added many materials, even some of which are multimedia. Aware that the musical manuscripts represent the most precious items of his collection, in 1958, he allowed an inventory to be completed by Raymond Meylan, a musicologist and flautist from Switzerland, and who was Venturi's colleague in the summer season orchestra of the Giglio Theater in Lucca.

When Venturi died in 1981, his daughter donated everything to the Public Library in Montecatini, which in 1989 carried out a complete cataloguing on the collection. In 2016, the musical manuscripts were restored thanks to a grant given by the Tuscan Region, and inserted in the OPAC for the Documentary Network of the Pistoia Province (Rete documentaria della provincia di Pistoia: REDOP) and National Library Service. For the on-line recataloguing, the Center of Tuscan Musical Documentation (Centro della Documentazione Musicale Toscana: CeDoMus) collaborated.

== Description ==
The Collection consists of 399 musical manuscripts, originating from Buggiano, Pistoia and Florence, most of which date from the second half of the 1700s and include works of some internationally famous composers (Domenico Cimarosa, Giovanni Paisiello, Pasquale Anfossi, Giuseppe Sarti, Florian Gassmann, Giovanni Francesco Giuliani), and of many local musicians (such as Alessandro Felici, son of Bartolomeo Felici, Giuseppe Aloisi, Cristiano Giuseppe Lidarti, Vincenzo Panerai, Charles-Antoine Campion), which often represent the only examples that exist today.

It also conserves theoretical works, such as Musico prattico by Giovanni Maria Bononcini, L'armonico pratico al cembalo by Francesco Gasparini, and the three notes, titled Combinazioni di registrature, Regole generali and Regole generali per la Messa, which was anonymous and conserved by the nobleman Pietro Sermolli of Buggiano on the correct recording of the organ during the performance of the eight ecclesiastic tones of the Latin mass. These examples represent one of the extremely few existing records dedicated to the established customs of the organ in the 1700s. Given the uniform dates of the works conserved in the collection (all of the manuscripts come from the second half of the 1700s in the area around Pistoia), the collection is an essential source for the reconstruction of the production and circulation of the musical culture in the Eighteenth Century.

== Expositions ==
Music collected in the fondo have been exposed in an exhibition in 2016 prepared by Lucca's Institute of History (division of Montecatini and Monsummano), and in an on-line exhibit created in 2017 by the same institute and by Musical Documentation Center of Tuscany, published in the Movio platform as Note di Carta (Paper Music Notes).
