= Symphony No. 91 (Haydn) =

Symphony in four movements by Joseph Haydn

- by Joseph Haydn
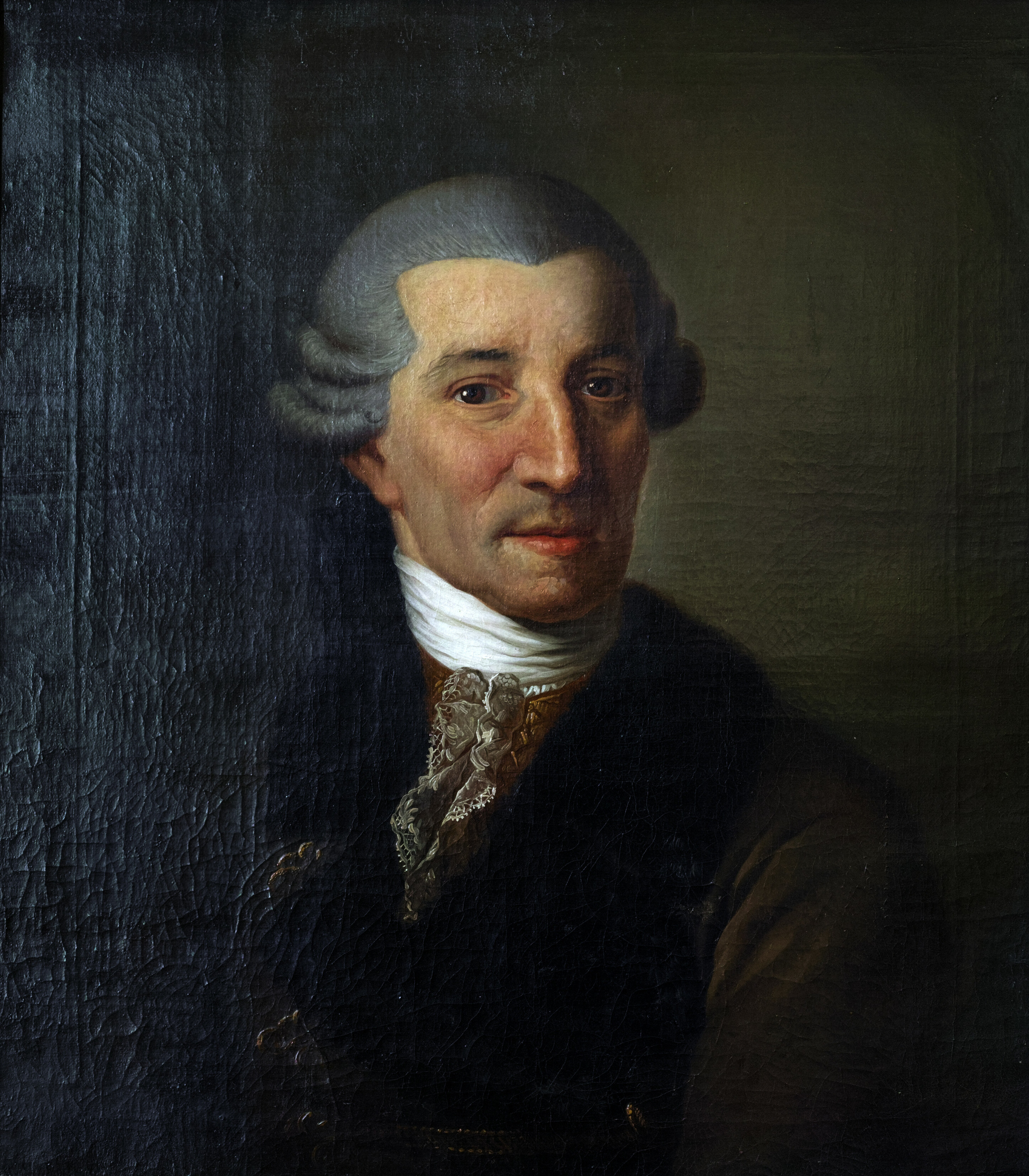
- Haydn in around 1785
- Key: E♭ major
- Catalogue: Hob. I:91
- Commissioned by: Claude-François-Marie Rigoley, Comte d'Ogny
- Composed: 1788
- Duration: c. 25 minutes
- Movements: 4
- Scoring: Orchestra

The Symphony No. 91 in E♭ major, Hoboken I/91, was written by Joseph Haydn. It was completed in 1788 as part of a three-symphony commission from Count d'Ogny for the Concert de la Loge Olympique, a successor to Haydn's series of "Paris symphonies". It is occasionally referred to as The Letter T referring to an older method of cataloguing Haydn's symphonic output. This triptych also includes Haydn's own Symphony No. 90 and Symphony No. 92.

The autograph manuscript bears a dedication to d'Ogny, but Haydn also gave Prince Krafft Ernst von Oettingen-Wallerstein a copy as if it were an original.

== Movements ==
The symphony is scored for flute, two oboes, two bassoons, two horns, continuo (harpsichord) and strings. It is the last symphony that Haydn composed that is not scored for trumpets and timpani.

The work is in standard four-movement form:

1. Largo – Allegro assai, 3/4
2. Andante in B♭ major, 2/4
3. Minuet: Un poco allegretto, 3/4
4. Vivace, (2/2) (alla breve)

The first movement opens with a slow introduction which Haydn works into the opening allegro assai. The Allegro's first theme is derived from an idea Haydn used in his cantata Arianna a Naxos, Hob. XXVIa/2, composed the same year. The theme is chromatic, legato and in two-part inverted counterpoint. The second theme is dancelike. Both the themes are closely linked with the opening largo.

The slow movement consists of a set of three variations on a theme. Listen to the bassoon and the accompanying string filigree in the first variation and the series of trills near the end of the movement.

The minuet includes a trio for the bassoon accompanied by plucked strings.

The finale opens quietly and builds gradually to a close.
