= Flute Quartet No. 1 (Mozart) =

1777 composition by W. A. Mozart

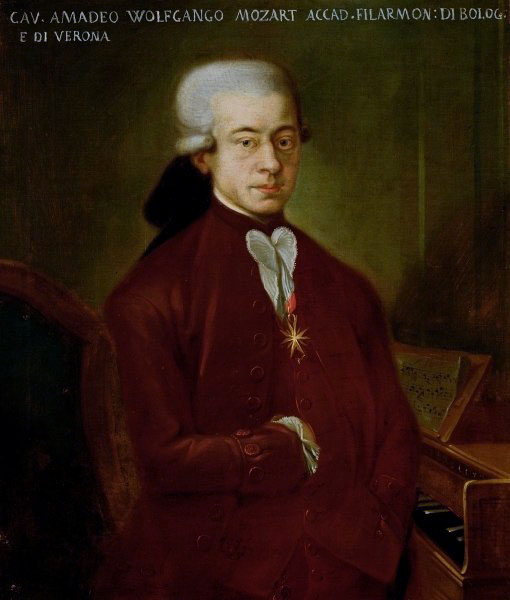
1777 portrait of Mozart

Mozart's Flute Quartet No. 1 in D major, K. 285 is written for flute, violin, viola and cello. It is the first of three quartets written in Mannheim, Germany, at the request of Ferdinand De Jean who was introduced to Mozart by Christian Cannabich. Mozart first mentioned his quartets in a letter to his father, Leopold Mozart, on 10 December 1777, and the first quartet is dated 25 December 1777.

== Background ==
On his journey to Paris, Mozart spent three months in Mannheim with Cannabich where he established a professional relationship with the Mannheim Orchestra and its musical organizations. Mozart composed prolifically for the Mannheim Opera and Mannheim Orchestra which established him as a leading composer in Mannheim. Frederick the Great of Prussia and George III of England raised the flute's status as a solo and chamber music instrument by studying flute and performing on it as a solo and chamber instrument. Time spent in Mannheim developed Mozart's "Mannheim Period" compositional style of figures and part writing specifically tailored to the character and qualities of the instrument. Mozart wrote music that featured expansive, downwards sighing figures in its writing that were evocative of the musical style that performers in Mannheim were used to. These compositional mannerisms, along with uncharacteristically long and meticulous development sections in the first movement, proved Mozart's Flute Quartet No. 1 to be a transitionary piece on his path to composing in Paris.

== Analysis ==
I. Allegro

II. Adagio

III. Rondo
Felix Skowronek with the Philadelphia String Quartet

=== I. Allegro ===
Mozart wrote this flute quartet's first movement in the concertant style. This is a close predecessor of the "concerto" form that features a single instrument at the highest possible level of virtuosity and playability. Mozart focused on sonority and distinction between flute and strings as a way to isolate the main voice in the ensemble and spotlight the technical and musical capabilities of the flute.

=== II. Adagio ===
The second movement, in B minor, is a serenade that features new techniques boasted by Mannheim's top level players. The string players create a textural contrast between their pizzicato figures and the flute's long sustained melodies that feature the Mannheim style's sweeping gestures and harmonic suspensions. The movement is short compared to the first movement and takes a similar approach to distinction of the main flute voice to the rest of the ensemble by means of texture rather than virtuosity.

=== III. Rondo ===
The finale of the quartet is a rondo-form movement that passes the melody of the rondo across the group in pairs and ornamented versions to showcase the virtuosity of the group as a whole. This movement is the least distinct in the hierarchy of voices but the flute frequently starts the rondo material on its own and is given cadenza-like lead-ins to the next reiteration of the rondo.

== Reception ==
The piece was received by its commissioner, Ferdinand De Jean, a wealthy Dutch amateur flautist, and was likely played in private affairs with no official premiere as it was a composition made for an amateur flautist as a favour to the connection between the two made by Mozart's close friend, Christian Cannabich. Mozart then wrote a disappointed letter to his father outlining his lack of compensation for the commission by the flautist and how he needed to distract himself from composing for instruments he "cannot bear".
