= Charles-Antoine Campion =

French-Italian composer

Charles-Antoine Campion, italianized as Carlo Antonio Campioni (16 November 1720 – 12 April 1788), was a French-Italian composer who was born in the Duchy of Lorraine. He was a prolific composer and represented a link between Baroque compositional methods and those of the Classical style.

== Life ==
=== Early years and employment in Livorno ===
Campion was born in Lunéville (Meurthe-et-Moselle) in Lorraine to Jacques and Charlotte Bruget. Not much is known about his early musical education in Lorraine, but he may have been a student of Henri Desmarets. Given that his father was serving in the Lorraine court, his family was transferred to Florence, Italy at the same time as the rise to the throne of the Tuscan Granduca (Grand Duke) Francis of Lorraine in 1737. During this period of time, he presumably came into contact with Giuseppe Tartini, who was Campion's teacher.

From 1752 to 1762, Campion was Chapel Master of the Cathedral in Livorno. He was fortunate to be friends with some aristocrats, and succeeded in having his opera (Venere placata, libretto by Marco Coltellini) performed for the celebration in Livorno (at the Avvalorati Academy) of the royal wedding of Joseph II and Princess Isabella of Parma in 1760. On 14 February 1763, the Grand Duke, with no regard to the normal selection procedures, nominated Campion Master of the Court Chapel, which combined that of the Cathedral and the Baptistry. It is possible that father Giovanni Battista Martini advised the Grand Duke to nominate Campion; it is known that Campion had been in contact with Martini previously (letters between the two men, who shared a passion for old music, are conserved at the International Museum and Music Library in Bologna).

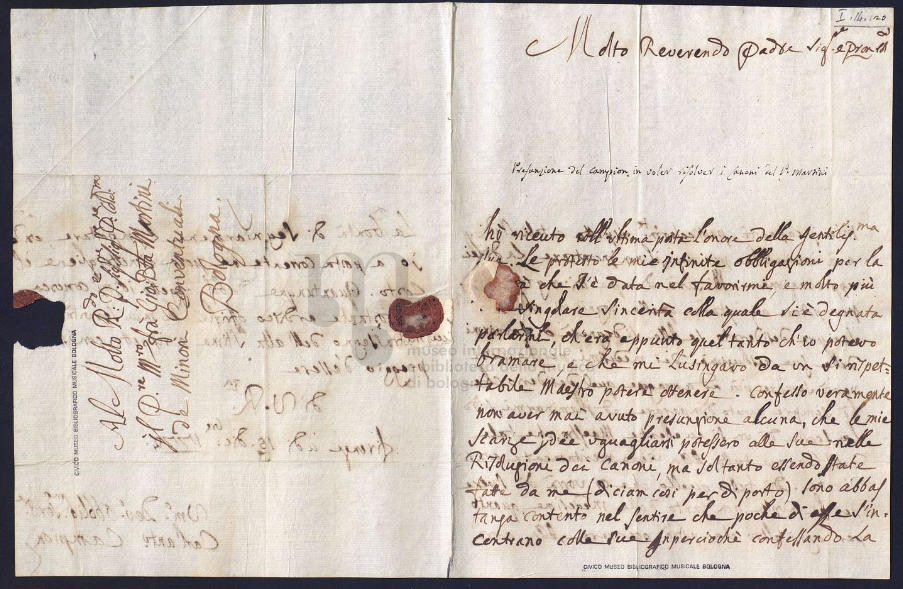
Letter send by Charles-Antoine Campion to Giovanni Battista Martini on 15 December 1772. Part of "Carteggi" Collection of Museo Internazionale e Biblioteca della Musica, Bologna, Italy

=== Employment in Florence and international recognition ===
The employment of Campion followed the idea and desire to rebuild the court's musical activities in Florence, which was intended to be reestablished by the Lorraines after the decline during the Reggenza period: an intention that became intensified with the new Grand Duke Peter Leopold. During his employment in Florence, Campion gained the respect of Italian and European cultural society for his taste and his collection of antique music. Charles Burney mentions him as a great collector in his The Present State of Music in France and Italy, affirming that his collection was second only to that of Martini. In the 1760s, he traveled abroad in order to promote the publication of his music. He printed his music in Amsterdam and Paris under his own supervision, and Walsh published his works in London. The Walsh editions were diffused worldwide and were highly appreciated by Thomas Jefferson, who became a great collector of Campion's compositions for violin, of which he even kept a thematic catalogue. In 1766, he married Margherita Perloz Brunet, a harpsichord expert and painter, to whom he dedicated some of his keyboard compositions. There is some information regarding his meeting with Wolfgang Amadeus Mozart, who at the time was only fourteen, in Florence in 1770.

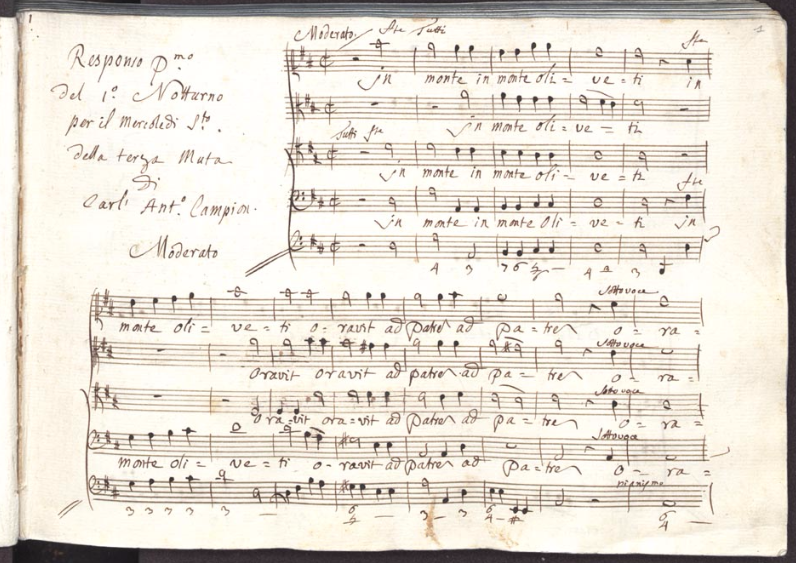
Autograph of Responsori per le Settimana Santa, composed by Campion in 1780 and conserved in Florence Conservatory

=== Final years and the querelle with Ligniville ===
In the 1770s, Campion was the protagonist of a harsh querelle with the Marquise Eugenio di Ligniville, who was also from Lorraine and participated in the regeneration of the Florentine musical activities and supported the nomination of Campion to Master of the Unified Courts. Ligniville, himself, also gained from this nomination and received the appointment of Superintendent of the Music of the Real Chamber and Chapel. The nature of their contracts very clearly established the fact that Ligniville's concern was to ensure more complex performances, while Campion's task was to guarantee ordinary routine musical activities and administrative tasks. However, in 1772, perhaps driven by the desire for attention or by a competitive tendency unique to himself, Ligniville told the Grand Duke to not be satisfied by his superior musical status and accused Campion of not being able to manage the Capella, both economically and musically. This might have been an attempt to take Campion's job. The accusations were not supported by many in the Duke's court: Campion was well-liked by the Grand Duke himself and his officials. He succeeded in personally reacting to the attack, demonstrating his ability by writing the Trattato teorico e pratico dell'accompagnamento del cimbalo con l'arte di trasportare in tutti i toni e sopra tutti gli strumenti (a treaty of composition) dedicated to Peter Leopold (the autograph is found at the Florence Conservatory). During the debate which lasted four years, Father Martini became indirectly involved, and although he was personally closer to Ligniville, Father Martini confirmed Campion's talent. As a result of his excessive accusations, in 1776, Ligniville was stripped of his responsibilities and fired, while Campion remained in his position, and received many honors until his death in 1788.

== Works and style ==
Campion was a prolific composer and represents a trait d'union between Baroque compositional methods and those of the Classical style. He composed many instrumental pieces for harpsichord and strings, which were mentioned previously as being extremely successful abroad for demonstrating an excessive chromatic style, surely influenced by his teacher Tartini. He worked very often with sacred music, in which on the contrary demonstrates a very rigid approach to counterpoint. Many of his sacred compositions originate from celebrations and the court: for example, the Requiem for the death of Francis I of Lorrain (1766, the autograph is in Berlin, see Source section); the Te Deum, written for the birth of the heir to the throne Francis II (1768), which required almost 200 performers; and the Requiem for the Florentine celebration of the death of Maria Theresa (1781), today in Vienna (see Sources). Oddly, there are no profane celebratory compositions by Campion if not the cited Venere placata for the marriage of Josef II, and the incomplete Etruria fortunata, written for Peter Leopold, which was probably unfinished because of Campion's death (the autograph is conserved in Fiesole, see Sources). It is also important to mention the non-celebratory profane cantatas T'amo bell'idol mio, for voice and instruments (conserved at the Conservatory of Florence), and the epithalamic cantata written for the Pichi family, today in Ancona.

== Sources ==
=== Autographs ===
Campion's autographs are found in the following places:

- Florence: the Conservatory Luigi Cherubini conserves the cited Trattato teorico e pratico dell'accompagnamento del cimbalo con l'arte di trasportare in tutti i toni e sopra tutti gli strumenti, dedicated to Peter Leopold (it remains unedited), and has at least 5 autographs of sacred music in addition to numerous contemporary manuscripts: all of the documents mostlty digitalized on Italian database Internet Culturale.
- Ancona: «Luciano Benincasa» library conserved a probable autograph of the epithalamic cantata for the Pichi family.
- Fiesole: in the library of the local music school (in the «Stefanelli» collection) was found the incomplete autograph of the cited Etruria fortunata, which is conserved in an elegant binding from the late 1700s.
- Vienna: Österreichische Nationalbibliothek has the autograph of the cited Requiem for Maria Theresa (1781).
- Paris: in the Bibliothèque Prunières a Concerto per oboe attributed to him is found.
- Münster: the Santini-Bibliothek had a Mottetto a 4 voci e strumenti dated 1766.
- Berlin: Musikabteilung of Preußischer Kulturbesitz into Staatsbibliothek zu Berlin conserved the cited Requiem for Francis I from 1766.

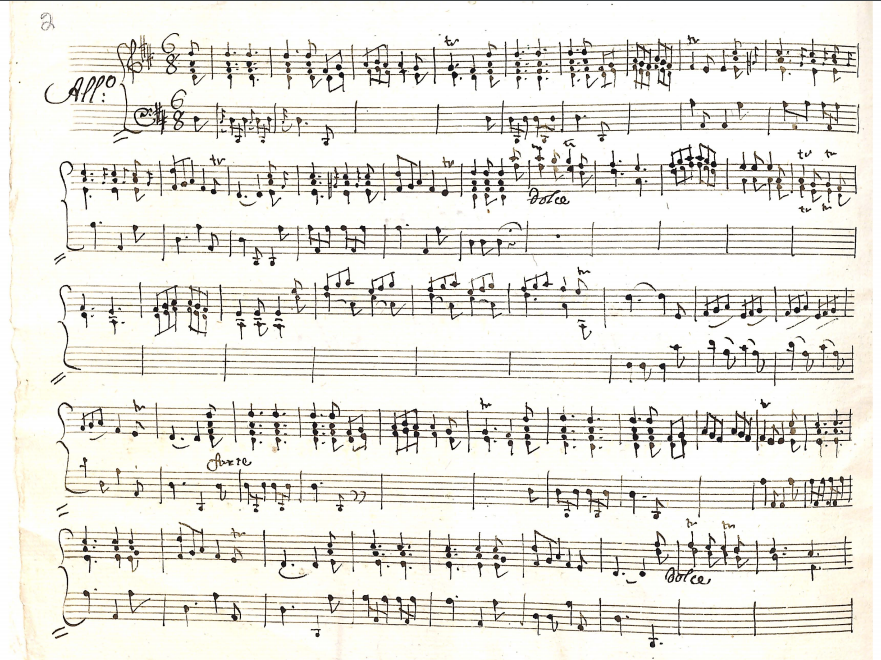
Manuscripts of the first page of the third movement of the Sonata per clavicembalo n. 3 in D Major of Campion, conserved in the Ricasoli Collections at the University of Kentucky in Louisville, dated 1790

=== Manuscripts ===
Manuscripts of his compositions are spread around the world. The greatest number are found in Italy, in the cited libraries in Florence, Ancona, and the following locations.

- Genoa (Paganini Conservatory),
- Rome (in the Lateran archive, in the «Doria Pamphill» Archive and in Giancarlo Bostirolla's private library),
- Naples (San Pietro a Majella Conservatory),
- Montecatini Terme (Venturi Collection),
- Bologna (International Museum and Music Library),
- Pistoia (Rospigliosi Collection in the Archive of the Chapter),
- Venice (Fondation of Ugo and Olga Levi, «Marciana» National Library, Torrefranca Collection of the Benedetto Marcello Conservatory),
- Bergamo («Angelo Mai» Civil Library),
- Stresa (Private Archive «Borromeo» on Isola Bella),
- Trento (State Archive),
- Pavia di Udine («Ricardi» Private Library).

Copies can be found abroad in Stockholm (Musik- och teaterbiblioteket), Berkeley (Jean Gray Hargrove Music Library) and Louisville (Ricasoli Collection University of Kentucky: the manuscripts found in this collection are digitalized in IMSLP).
