= Fausto Torrefranca =

Italian musicologist

Fausto Torrefranca (Vibo Valentia, 1 February 1883 – Rome, 26 November 1955) Italian musicologist and critic.

Torrefranca studied in Turin and in Germany, he was also the music librarian at the conservatories in Naples and in Milan. He taught at the Catholic University of Milan and at the University of Florence.

Torrefranca's best-known works and essays include:

- Le origini delle musica (The Origins of Music) (1907)
- Giacomo Puccini e l'opera internazionale (G.P and International Opera) (1912)
- Le origini italiane del romanticismo musicale (The Italian Origins of Musical Romanticism) (1930)
