= Symphony No. 90 (Haydn) =

Symphony in four movements by Joseph Haydn

- by Joseph Haydn
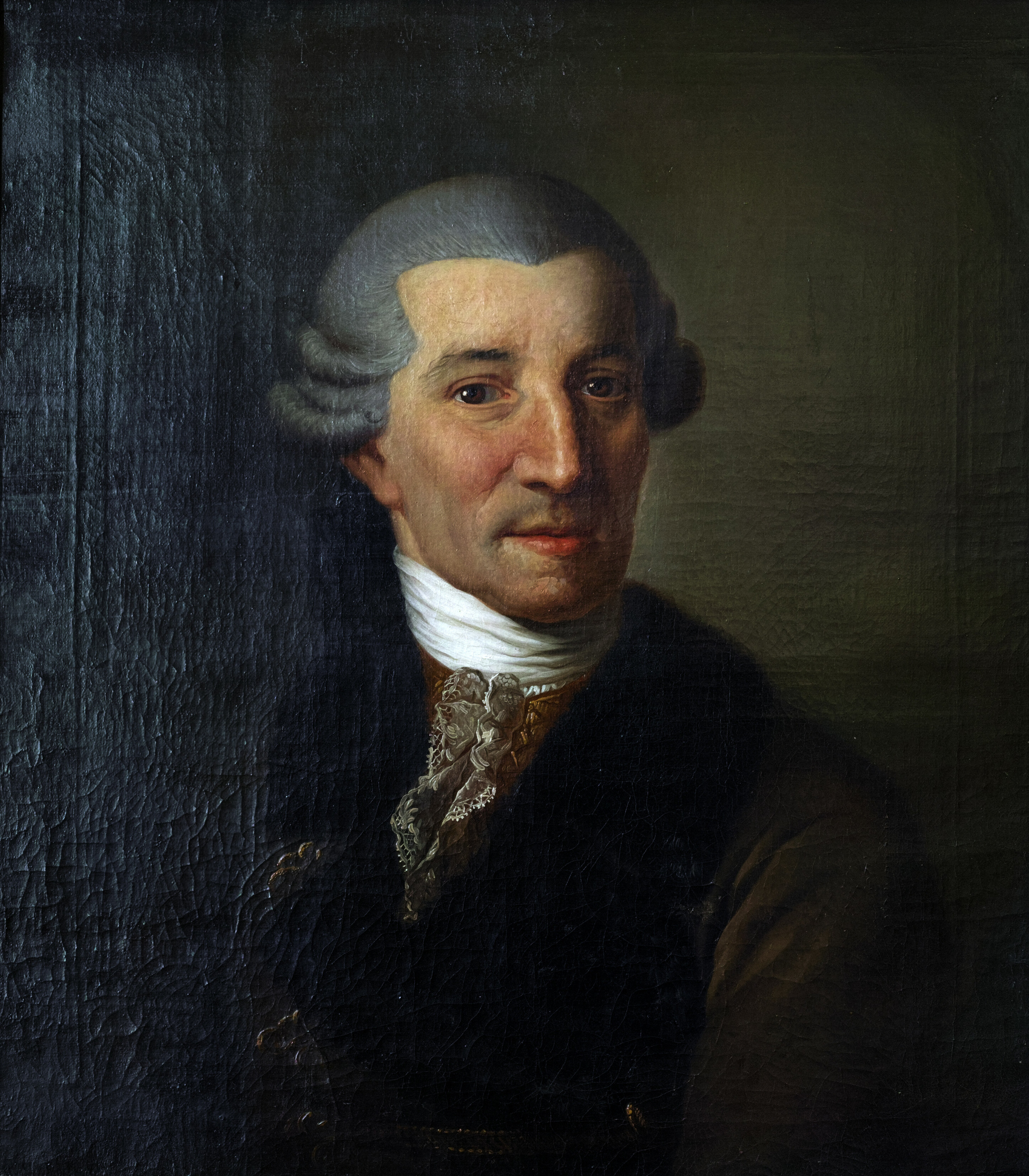
- Haydn in around 1785
- Key: C major
- Catalogue: Hob. I:90
- Commissioned by: Claude-François-Marie Rigoley, Comte d'Ogny
- Composed: 1788
- Duration: c. 25 minutes
- Movements: 4
- Scoring: Orchestra

Symphony No. 90 in C major, Hoboken I/90, was written by Joseph Haydn in 1788 as part of a three-symphony commission by Count d'Ogny for the Concert de la Loge Olympique. It is occasionally referred to as The Letter R – referring to an older method of cataloguing Haydn's symphonic output. This triptych also includes Haydn's own Symphony No. 91 and Symphony No. 92.

== Movements ==
The symphony is scored for flute, two oboes, two bassoons, two horns, two trumpets, timpani, continuo (harpsichord) and strings.

It is in standard four-movement form:

1. Adagio — Allegro assai, 3/4
2. Andante in F major, 2/4
3. Menuetto: Allegretto, 3/4
4. Finale: Allegro assai, 2/4

The second movement is in double variation form with a corresponding theme in F minor and consisting of instrument solos for each variation of the first theme.

The finale contains one of Haydn's more famous jokes. Soon after the recapitulation starts, the music arrives at a rousing and unexpected "ending" in C major followed by four measures of silence which leads the audience to believe the symphony may have actually finished. Instead, the first theme quietly resumes in the remote key of D♭ major.
