= Symphony No. 92 (Haydn) =

Haydn's Oxford Symphony

- Oxford
- by Joseph Haydn
- Haydn in 1791
- Key: G major
- Catalogue: Hob. I:92
- Composed: 1789
- Dedication: Claude-François-Marie Rigoley
- Duration: c. 30 minutes
- Movements: 4
- Scoring: Orchestra

Premiere
- Date: 1791
- Location: University of Oxford
- Conductor: Joseph Haydn

Joseph Haydn completed his Symphony No. 92 in G major, Hoboken I/92, popularly known as the Oxford Symphony, in 1789 as one of a set of three symphonies commissioned by the French Count d'Ogny.

The symphony is scored for flute, 2 oboes, 2 bassoons, 2 horns, 2 trumpets, timpani, and strings.

== Background ==
The symphony is called the "Oxford" because Haydn is said to have conducted it at the conclusion of a ceremony in 1791 in which the degree of Doctor of Music was conferred on him by Oxford University. A candidate for this doctorate was required to present a specimen of his skill in composition, and that presented by Haydn was not as is sometimes said this symphony, but a minuet al rovescio, i. e. a palindrome, though not one specially composed for the occasion, as it first appears in G major in Haydn's 1772 symphony no. 47 (Hob. I:47), and in the following year in A major as the minuet of his keyboard sonata in that key (Hob. XVI:26), where the trio is also a palindrome. The "Oxford" nickname stuck, though the symphony had actually been written in 1789 for performance in Paris. The degree was conferred fairly soon after Haydn's first arrival in England, and as he had not by then finished composing any of the twelve "London" symphonies which he ultimately wrote for England, he brought to the Oxford ceremony his most recently completed example in the form.

Haydn's appearance at Oxford is evidence of the international success he attained in his late fifties. It was Charles Burney, himself a graduate of University College and an Oxford doctor of music, who suggested that the degree should be conferred on Haydn and who made all the arrangements. As the composer had arrived from London later than expected, he had to conduct a symphony already familiar to the Oxford musicians, who were to play it at sight.

As Haydn had agreed to conduct three concerts in Oxford in connection with receiving his degree, a rehearsal was scheduled for the second morning, and the same evening the symphony we now know as the Oxford was played to the same acclaim it had previously enjoyed at Johann Peter Salomon's concerts in London. (Salomon was the impresario who had commissioned the composition of Haydn's twelve "London" Symphonies, of which however only the last is called by German-speakers die Londoner Symphonie.)

== Music ==
The symphony is in four movements:

1. Adagio – Allegro spiritoso
2. Adagio cantabile
3. Menuetto: Allegretto
4. Presto

=== I. Adagio – Allegro spiritoso ===
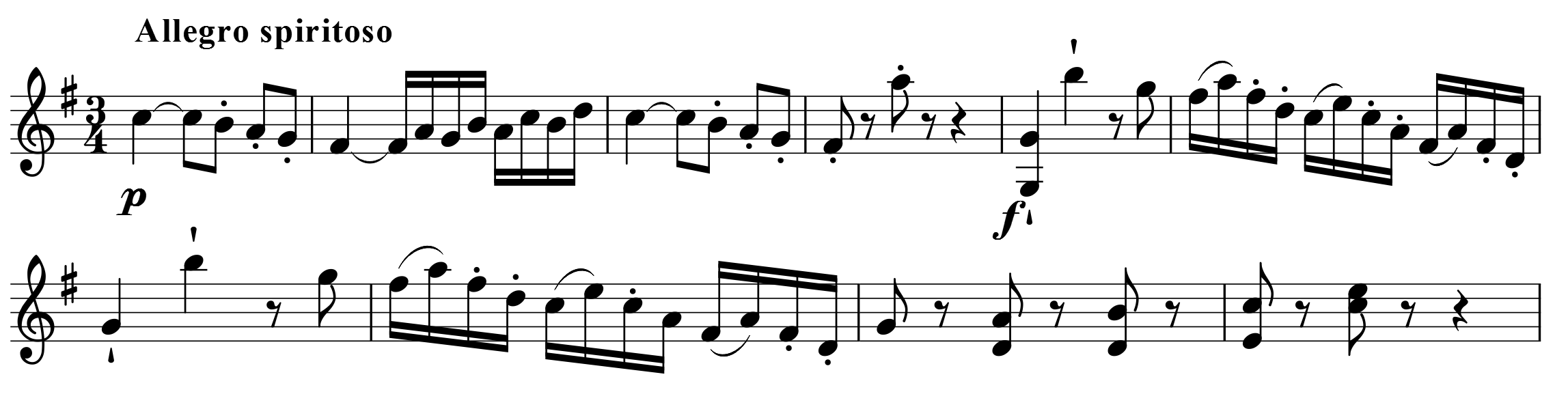
The opening theme of the first movement, as commenced by the first violins from measures 21 to 30.

Haydn distinguishes each section of the sonata form in this movement by use of strong contrasts of stability and instability. Before revealing the first theme of the symphony, Haydn opens this movement with a slow introduction that begins in the tonic G major, modulates through to the parallel minor, and prolongs the German sixth chord (Gr^{+6}) in G major. He begins the first theme in the tonic but on a dominant seventh chord. This is very unusual of symphonies of the time, and it reflects an aspect of Haydn's unique compositional style. Because the rest of the Oxford will reflect many of the ideas presented in this first theme, this symphony has been termed monothematic.

Following the first theme is the transition, which allows Haydn to modulate to the dominant. The second theme begins with the opening idea of the movement, but in the dominant key. As this theme progresses it enters a section of minor-mode before entering into the closing theme. Haydn stays in the tonic key through the closing of the first movement. In the development section, Haydn borrows themes from the exposition, then “develops” and embellishes them. He adds sections of subject change and digression from the original theme as well as moments of rest or silence. These qualities of the development are all very characteristic of Haydn. Furthermore, he draws upon the older style of intricate counterpoint to enhance the galant style of the symphony.

=== II. Adagio cantabile ===
The second movement is in ternary form with a slow and song-like melody. Haydn, however, uses an unusual construction in this movement by adding an intense middle section in minor. This minor interlude is based on a motive from the opening section. A shortened return of the major section precedes a section of the movement that features the winds.

=== III. Menuetto: Allegretto ===
Haydn composes the third movement in ABA form with a minuet and trio. Both the minuet and trio are in binary form with repeats. In order to create a more entertaining movement for the listener, Haydn composes the minuet with phrases of six measures as opposed to the normal four-measure phrase and adds syncopations and stops. All of these qualities were found to be humorous by the audiences of Haydn's time because they were so unusual.

=== IV. Presto ===
Haydn's final movement of the Oxford Symphony is centred on a feeling of tension and release. In order to convey this quality to the listener, Haydn wrote this sonata form movement slightly faster and shorter than the first movement of the symphony to create a climactic ending. The frequent chromatic inflections in the melodic line, as well as the use of woodwind and brass colour, are reminiscent of opera buffa, and seem to foreshadow the style of Rossini. The symphony, which began with three slow, soft G major chords ends with three loud, emphatic ones.

== See also ==
- List of symphonies by name
