= William Kennedy Dickson filmography =

List of films on which William Kennedy Dickson has worked.

Date	Title	Role	Notes
1896	The Tramp: Milk White Flag	Producer	
1895	Chinese Laundry Scene	Producer	aka Robetta and Doretto, [No. 2]
1895	Elsie Jones	Producer	aka Elsie Jones, No. 1
1895	The Rixfords, No. 1	Producer	
1895	The Rixfords, No. 2	Producer	
1895	Robetta and Doretto, No. 1	Producer	aka Opium Den and Opium Joint
1895	Annabelle Serpentine Dance	Producer	aka Serpentine Dances
1895	Billy Edwards and the Unknown	Producer	
1895	Elsie Jones, No. 2	Producer	
1895	John W. Wilson and Bertha Waring	Producer	
1895	New Bar Room	Producer	aka Barroom Scene (USA: reissue title)
1895	Robetta and Doretto, No. 3	Producer	
1894	Dance	Producer	aka Frank Lawton, Trio and Trio Dance
1894	Finale of 1st Act, Hoyt's 'Milk White Flag'	Producer	aka Milk White Flag
1894	Fire Rescue Scene	Producer	
1894	Topack and Steele	Producer	aka Cleveland and Harrison
1894	The Widder	Producer	aka The Widow
1894	Souvenir Strip of the Edison Kinetoscope	Producer	aka Sandow, No. 1, Sandow, the Modern Hercules and Sandow: The Strong Man
1894	Edison Kinetoscopic Record of a Sneeze	Producer	aka Fred Ott's Sneeze
1894	Amateur Gymnast, No. 2	Producer	
1894	Annabelle Butterfly Dance	Producer	
1894	Annabelle Sun Dance	Producer	
1894	Annie Oakley	Producer	
1894	Armand D'Ary	Producer	
1894	Athlete with Wand	Producer	
1894	Band Drill	Producer	
1894	The Barbershop	Producer	
1894	A Bar Room Scene	Producer	
1894	Bertoldi (Mouth Support)	Producer	
1894	Bertoldi (Table Contortion)	Producer	
1894	Boxing	Producer	
1894	The Boxing Cats (Prof. Welton's)	Producer	
1894	Boxing Match	Producer	
1894	Bucking Broncho	Producer	Uncredited
1894	Buffalo Bill	Producer	
1894	Buffalo Dance	Producer	Uncredited
1894	Caicedo (with Pole)	Producer	Uncredited. aka Caicedo, King of the Slack Wire
1894	Caicedo (with Spurs)	Producer	
1894	Carmencita	Producer	
1894	The Carnival Dance	Producer	
1894	Cock Fight, No. 2	Producer	
1894	The Cock Fight	Producer	aka Cockfight
1894	Corbett and Courtney Before the Kinetograph	Producer	aka Edison Kinetoscopic Record of Boxers and The Corbett-Courtney Fight
1894	Cupid's Dance	Producer	
1894	Dogs Fighting	Producer	
1894	Edison Employee Picnic	Producer	
1894	Fancy Club Swinger	Producer	aka Club Swinger, No. 2
1894	Fred Ott Holding a Bird	Producer	
1894	French Dancers	Producer	
1894	Glenroy Bros., No. 2	Producer	
1894	Hadj Cheriff	Producer	
1894	Highland Dance	Producer	
1894	The Hornbacker-Murphy Fight	Producer	
1894	Men on Parallel Bars	Producer	
1894	Miss Lucy Murray	Producer	
1894	Organ Grinder	Producer	
1894	Oriental Dance	Producer	
1894	The Pickaninny Dance, from the 'Passing Show'	Producer	
1894	Rat Killing	Producer	
1894	Ruth Dennis	Producer	
1894	Sioux Ghost Dance	Producer	
1894	Trained Bears	Producer	
1894	Trapeze	Producer	
1894	Unsuccessful Somersault	Producer	aka Amateur Gymnast, No. 1
1894	Whirlwind Gun Spinning	Producer	
1894	The Wrestling Dog	Producer	
1894	Wrestling Match	Producer	
1893	Horse Shoeing	Producer	
1892	Boxing	Producer	
1892	Fencing	Producer	
1892	A Hand Shake	Producer	
1892	Man on Parallel Bars	Producer	
1892	Wrestling	Producer	
1891	Dickson Greeting	Producer	
1891	Duncan and Another, Blacksmith Shop	Producer	
1891	Duncan or Devonald with Muslin Cloud	Producer	
1891	Duncan Smoking	Producer	
1891	Men Boxing	Producer	
1891	Monkey and Another, Boxing	Producer	
1891	Newark Athlete	Producer	
1890	Monkeyshines, No. 1	Producer	
1890	Monkeyshines, No. 2	Producer	
1890	Monkeyshines, No. 3	Producer	
1903	Rip Van Winkle	Director	Uncredited
1899	King John	Director	aka Beerbohm Tree, the Great English Actor
1898	Pope Leo XIII Being Carried in Chair Through Upper Loggia, No. 101	Director	
1898	Pope Leo XIII Being Seated Bestowing Blessing Surrounded by Swiss Guards, No. 107	Director	
1898	Pope Leo XIII in Canopy Chair, No. 100	Director	
1898	Pope Leo XIII in Carriage, No. 102	Director	
1898	Pope Leo XIII Leaving Carriage and Being Ushered Into Garden, No. 104	Director	
1898	Pope Leo XIII Seated in Garden, No. 105	Director	
1898	Pope Leo XIII Walking Before Kneeling Guards	Director	
1898	Pope Leo XIII and Count Pecci, No. 1	Director	as William Kennedy Laurie-Dickson
1898	Pope Leo XIII in Carriage	Director	
1897	Musical Drill; Troop A., Third Cavalry	Director	
1897	A Newsboys' Scrap	Director	
1897	He and She	Director	as William Kennedy Laurie Dickson
1896	Fire Department, New Haven, Conn	Director	
1896	Sound Money Parade	Director	
1896	The Sound Money Parade	Director	
1896	Winchester Arms Factory at Noon Time	Director	
1896	Rip Leaving Sleepy Hollow	Director	Uncredited
1896	Rip's Toast	Director	
1896	Serpentine Dance by Annabelle	Director	
1896	Stable on Fire	Director	
1896	Dancing Darkies	Director	
1896	A Hard Wash	Director	
1896	A Watermelon Feast	Director	
1896	Rip's Twenty Years' Sleep	Director	Uncredited
1895	The Gay Brothers	Director	
1894	Souvenir Strip of the Edison Kinetoscope	Director	aka Sandow, No. 1, Sandow, the Modern Hercules and Sandow: The Strong Man
1894	Fred Ott's Sneeze	Director	
1894	Annabelle Butterfly Dance	Director	
1894	Annie Oakley	Director	Uncredited
1894	Athlete with Wand	Director	
1894	Buffalo Dance (film)	Director	Uncredited
1894	Caicedo (with Pole)	Director	Uncredited, aka Caicedo, King of the Slack Wire
1894	Carmencita	Director	
1894	The Dickson Experimental Sound Film	Director	Uncredited
1894	The Hornbacker-Murphy Fight	Director	
1894	Luis Martinetti, Contortionist	Director	Uncredited
1893	Blacksmith Scene	Director	aka Blacksmith Scene #1 and Blacksmithing Scene
1891	Dickson Greeting	Director	
1891	Men Boxing	Director	
1891	Newark Athlete	Director	
1890	Monkeyshines, No. 1	Director	
1903	Pope Leo XIII in His Carriage	Cinematographer	
1903	Pope Leo XIII Passing Through Upper Loggia	Cinematographer	
1903	Cock Fight, No. 2	Cinematographer	
1899	A Dip in the Mediterranean	Cinematographer	
1899	Harbor of Villefranche	Cinematographer	
1899	Admiral Dewey	Cinematographer	
1899	Jack Tars Ashore	Cinematographer	
1899	Officers of the 'Olympia'	Cinematographer	
1899	'Sagasta', Admiral Dewey's Pet Pig	Cinematographer	
1899	Wreck of the 'Mohican'	Cinematographer	
1899	Wreck of the S.S. 'Paris'	Cinematographer	
1899	King John	Cinematographer	aka Beerbohm Tree, the Great English Actor
1898	The Vatican Guards, Rome	Cinematographer	
1897	Columbia Bicycle Factory	Cinematographer	
1897	Butterfly Dance	Cinematographer	
1896	American Falls, Goat Island	Cinematographer	
1896	American Falls, Luna Island	Cinematographer	
1896	Canadian Falls, from American Side	Cinematographer	
1896	Canadian Falls: Panoramic View from Michigan Central R.R	Cinematographer	
1896	Canadian Falls: Table Rock	Cinematographer	
1896	Canadian Falls: Table Rock	Cinematographer	
1896	Li Hung Chang, 5th Avenue & 55th Street, N.Y.	Cinematographer	
1896	Li Hung Chang at Grant's Tomb	Cinematographer	
1896	Li Hung Chang Driving Through 4th St. and Broadway	Cinematographer	
1896	Lower Rapids, Niagara Falls	Cinematographer	
1896	McKinley at Home, Canton, Ohio	Cinematographer	aka William McKinley at Canton, Ohio
1896	Niagara Gorge from Erie R.R.	Cinematographer	
1896	Panorama of American & Canadian Falls, Taken Opposite American Falls	Cinematographer	
1896	Parade, Americus Club, Canton Ohio	Cinematographer	
1896	Parade, Sound Money Club, Canton, O.	Cinematographer	
1896	Pointing Down Gorge, Niagara Falls	Cinematographer	
1896	Serpentine Dance by Annabelle	Cinematographer	
1896	Taken from Trolley in Gorge, Niagara Falls	Cinematographer	
1896	Upper Rapids, from Bridge	Cinematographer	
1896	West Point Cadet Drill	Cinematographer	
1896	West Point Cadet Cavalry	Cinematographer	
1896	West Point Cadet Cavalry	Cinematographer	
1895	Annabelle Serpentine Dance	Cinematographer	aka Serpentine Dances
1894	The Barbershop	Cinematographer	
1894	Imperial Japanese Dance	Cinematographer	
1894	Leonard-Cushing Fight	Cinematographer	
1891	Duncan and Another, Blacksmith Shop	Cinematographer	
1891	Duncan and Another, Blacksmith Shop	Cinematographer	
1891	Duncan Smoking	Cinematographer	
1891	Men Boxing	Cinematographer	
1891	Monkey and Another, Boxing	Cinematographer	
1891	Newark Athlete	Cinematographer	
1890	Monkeyshines, No. 1	Cinematographer	
1890	Monkeyshines, No. 2	Cinematographer	
1890	Monkeyshines, No. 3	Cinematographer	
1894	The Dickson Experimental Sound Film	Actor	Uncredited Violin Player
1893	Horse Shoeing	Actor	
1892	A Hand Shake	Actor	
1891	Dickson Greeting	Actor	
2007	RMS Titanic - The Story Biograph Told	Camera operator	Archival footage
1903	Rip Van Winkle	Writer	Uncredited
1894	The Dickson Experimental Sound Film	Soundtrack	"The Chimes of Normandy"
1894	The Dickson Experimental Sound Film	Musician	Uncredited violin player
1901	Santos Dumont Explaining His Air Ship to the Hon. C.S. Rolls	Director	Short film
