= List of American films of the 1890s =

A list of the earliest American films released in the 1890s.

== 1890s ==
| Title | Director | Cast | Genre | Notes |
|---|---|---|---|---|
1890
| Monkeyshines, No. 1 | William K.L. Dickson, William Heise | | Short | First ever American film: contradictory sources indicate this was shot either in June 1889 or November 1890 |
| Monkeyshines, No. 2 | William K.L. Dickson, William Heise | | Short | |
| Monkeyshines, No. 3 | William K.L. Dickson, William Heise | | Short | disappeared and may be lost |
| Monkeyshines, No. 4 | William K.L. Dickson, William Heise | | Short | |
| Monkeyshines, No. 5 | William K.L. Dickson, William Heise | | Short | |
1891
| Dickson Greeting | William Kennedy Dickson | William Kennedy Dickson | Short | |
| Newark Athlete | William Kennedy Dickson | | Short | |
1893
| Blacksmith Scene | William K.L. Dickson | | Short | First Kinetoscope film shown in public exhibition |
1894
| The Dickson Experimental Sound Film | William K.L. Dickson | | Short | First Kinetophone film (i.e., first film with synchronous sound). Possibly 1895. |
| The Barbershop | William K.L. Dickson, William Heise | | Short | |
1895
| The Execution of Mary Stuart | Alfred Clark | Robert Thomae | Short | |
1896
| Rip's Twenty Years' Sleep | | | Short | |
| Dancing Darkies | William K.L. Dickson | | Short | |
| McKinley at Home, Canton, Ohio | | William McKinley, Ida Saxton McKinley, George Cortelyou | Short | |
| The Kiss | William Heise | May Irwin, John Rice | Short | |
1897
| The Corbett-Fitzsimmons Fight | Enoch J. Rector | James J. Corbett, Bob Fitzsimmons | Documentary,Feature | First feature film, first wide screen film, most successful film of the century |
| Peeping Tom | | | Short | |
1899
| How Would You Like to Be the Ice Man? | | | Short | |

== See also ==
- AFI Catalog of Feature Films
- 1890 in the United States
- 1891 in the United States
- 1892 in the United States
- 1893 in the United States
- 1894 in the United States
- 1895 in the United States
- 1896 in the United States
- 1897 in the United States
- 1898 in the United States
- 1899 in the United States
