= 19th century in film =

== Events ==
- 1826 – Nicéphore Niépce takes the oldest known extant photograph, View from the Window at Le Gras.
- 1833 – Joseph Plateau (Belgium) introduces a scientific demonstration device that creates an optical illusion of movement by mounting drawings on the face of a slotted, spinning disk, later published as the Fantascope (and now better known as the Phenakistoscope). Simon von Stampfer (Vienna) publishes the very similar stroboscopic discs a few months later.
- 1866 – The Zoetrope is introduced. The device was a hollow drum with a strip of pictures around its inner surface. When the drum was spun and the pictures viewed through slots on the side of the drum, the pictures appeared to move.
- 1870s – French inventor Charles-Émile Reynaud improved on the Zoetrope idea by placing mirrors at the center of the drum. He called his invention the Praxinoscope. Reynaud developed other versions of the Praxinoscope too, including a Praxinoscope Theatre, where the device was enclosed in a viewing box, and the Projecting Praxinoscope. Eventually he created the "Théâtre Optique", a large machine based on the Praxinoscope, but able to project longer animated strips.
- 1874 – Passage de Vénus is recorded as a series of still pictures on a disc with Jules Janssen's photographic revolver.
- 1878 – Railroad tycoon Leland Stanford hires British photographer Eadweard Muybridge to settle arguments about the strides of horses that were difficult to discern with the naked eye. Muybridge successfully photographed successive positions of horses in fast motion, using a battery of 12 cameras controlled by trip wires and an electrical shutter system. Stanford's experiments were partly inspired by French scientist's Étienne-Jules Marey studies with equipment that graphically recorded data to analyze animal and human movement.
- 1880 – Eadweard Muybridge holds a public demonstration of his Zoopraxiscope, a magic lantern provided with a rotating disc with artist's renderings of Muybridge's chronophotographic sequences. It was used as a demonstration device by Muybridge in his illustrated lecture (the original preserved in the Museum of Kingston upon Thames in England).
- 1882 – American inventor George Eastman begins experimenting with new types of photographic film, with his employee, William Walker.
- 1882 – French physiologist Étienne-Jules Marey develops his own version of Janssen's camera: a chronophotographic gun that could photograph twelve successive images per second.
- 1885 – American inventors George Eastman and Hannibal Goodwin each invent a sensitized celluloid base roll photographic film to replace the glass plates then in use.
- 1887 – German chronophotographer Ottomar Anschutz very successfully presents his photographs in motion with his Electrotachyscope that uses transparent pictures in a wheel.
- 1887 – Hannibal Goodwin files for a patent for his photographic film.
- 1888 – George Eastman files for a patent for his photographic film.
- 1888 – Thomas Edison meets with Eadweard Muybridge to discuss adding sound to moving pictures. Edison begins his own experiments.
- 1888 – Louis Aimé Augustin Le Prince creates the first motion picture films created on paper rolls of film.
- 1889 – George Eastman's celluloid base roll photographic film becomes commercially available.
- June 1889 or November 1890 – William K. L. Dickson, working for Thomas Edison, creates the first known motion picture films shot in the United States, the Monkeyshines films.
- 1891 – Designed around the work of Anschutz, Muybridge, Marey, and Eastman, Thomas Edison's employee William K. L. Dickson finishes work on a motion-picture camera, called the Kinetograph, and a viewing machine, called the Kinetoscope.
- May 20, 1891 – Thomas Edison holds the first public presentation of his Kinetoscope for the National Federation of Women's Clubs.
- August 24, 1891 – Thomas Edison files for a patent of the Kinetoscope.
- 1892 – Charles-Émile Reynaud begins public screenings in Paris at the Théâtre Optique, with hundreds of drawings on a reel that he wound through his Praxinoscope projector to construct moving image stories that continued for about 15 minutes each.
- March 14, 1893 – Thomas Edison is granted Patent #493,426 for "An Apparatus for Exhibiting Photographs of Moving Objects" (the Kinetoscope).
- 1893 – Thomas Edison builds a motion-picture studio, dubbed the "Black Maria" by his staff.
- May 9, 1893 – In America, Thomas Edison holds the first public exhibition of films shot using his Kinetograph at the Brooklyn Institute. Only one person at a time could use his viewing machine, the Kinetoscope.
- January 7, 1894 – Dickson and William Heise film "Fred Ott's Sneeze" with the Kinetoscope at "Edison's Black Maria".
- April 14, 1894 – The first commercial presentation of the Kinetoscope takes place at the Holland Brothers' Kinetoscope Parlor at 1155 Broadway, New York City.
- 1894 – Kinetoscope viewing parlors begin to open in major cities. Each parlor contains several machines.
- November 1895 – In Germany, Emil and Max Skladanowsky start publicly screening their films with their Bioskop.
- 1895 – In France, Gaumont, the world's oldest extant film studio, is founded as a producer of photographic equipment (the company would start production of films in 1897).
- December 1895 – In France, Auguste and Louis Lumière hold their first commercial screenings of films shot with their Cinématographe, a lightweight, hand-held motion picture camera.
- January 1896 – In Britain, Birt Acres and Robert W. Paul develop their own film projector, the Theatrograph (later known as the Animatograph).
- January 1896 – In the United States, a projector called the Vitascope is designed by Charles Francis Jenkins and Thomas Armat. Armat began working with Thomas Edison to manufacture the Vitascope, which projected motion pictures.
- January 26, 1896 – Brothers Auguste and Louis Lumière release L'Arrivée d'un train en gare de La Ciotat in France.
- April 1896 – Thomas Edison and Thomas Armat's Vitascope is used to project motion pictures in public screenings in New York City
- September 28, 1896 – Pathé-Frères is founded in Paris.
- 1896 – French magician and filmmaker Georges Méliès begins experimenting with the new motion picture technology, developing many early special effects techniques.
- May 4, 1897 – 125 people die during a film screening at the Bazar de la Charité in Paris after a curtain catches on fire from the ether used to fuel the projector lamp.
- 1897 – Vitagraph Studios are established in New York City.
- March 22, 1899 – London inventor Edward Raymond Turner applies for a patent for his additive colour process for colour motion picture film.
- September 1899 – The British Mutoscope and Biograph Company makes King John (a very short silent film) in London, the first known film based on a Shakespeare play.
- September 1899 – Georges Méliès releases The Dreyfus Affair film series in France, with the last episode featuring events of the current month.
- October 1899 – Georges Méliès releases Cendrillon in France, the first screen adaptation of the traditional fairy tale "Cinderella".

== Births ==
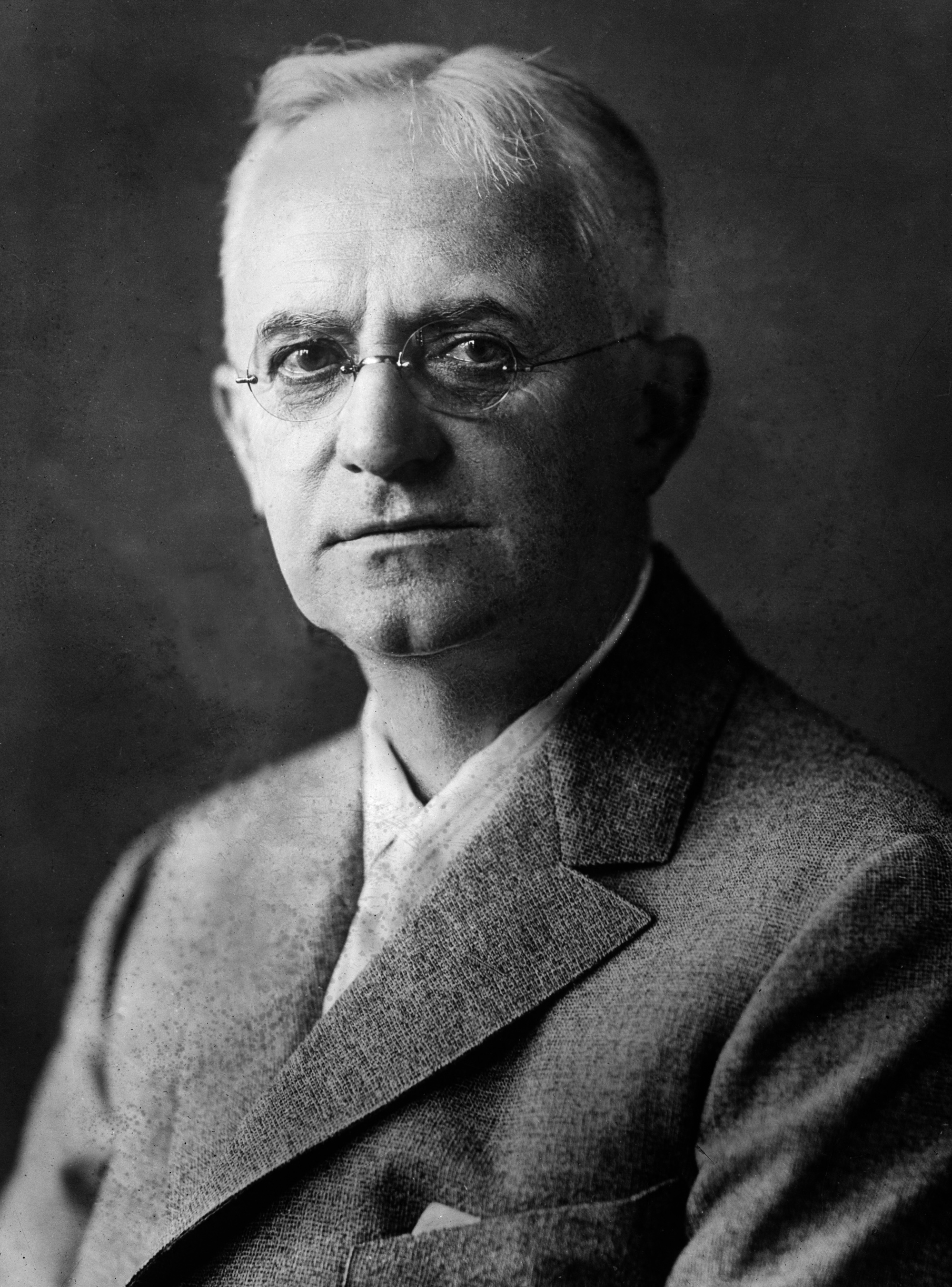
George Eastman

- April 9, 1830 – Eadweard Muybridge, English photographer
- February 11, 1847 – Thomas Edison, American inventor, businessman
- April 20, 1851 – Siegmund Lubin, American motion picture pioneer
- January 15, 1853 – Tom Ricketts, English actor, director
- July 12, 1854 – George Eastman, American entrepreneur, founder of the Eastman Kodak Company, inventor of roll film
- March 9, 1856 – Eddie Foy, American actor and dancer
- February 14, 1859 – Justus Hagman, Swedish actor
- February 20, 1860 – Karl Mantzius, Danish actor, theatre director and writer
- August 24, 1861 – Dante Testa, Italian actor and director
- December 8, 1861 – Georges Méliès, French filmmaker
- December 20, 1861 – Ferdinand Bonn, German stage and film actor
- November 4, 1862 – Rasmus Rasmussen, Norwegian stage and film actor
- April 19, 1863 – Hemmo Kallio, Finnish stage and film actor
- July 21, 1863 – C. Aubrey Smith, English-born actor and cricketer
- November 4, 1863 – Harry Beresford, British actor
- April 10, 1864 – Tully Marshall, American actor
- June 9, 1864 – Jeanne Bérangère, French actress
- November 19, 1864 – George Barbier, American actor
- June 19, 1865 – May Whitty, English actress
- January 6, 1866 – Harry Davenport, American actor
- January 19, 1866 – Dante Cappelli, Italian actor
- February 23, 1868 – Anna Hofman-Uddgren, Swedish actress
- April 10, 1868 – George Arliss, English actor
- November 9, 1868 – Marie Dressler, Canadian-American actress
- April 15, 1869 – Harry C. Bradley, American actor
- May 2, 1869 – Tyrone Power Sr., English-American actor
- September 15, 1869 – Paweł Owerłło, Polish actor
- December 20, 1869 – Charley Grapewin, American actor and writer

== Deaths ==
- c. September 16, 1890 – Louis Aimé Augustin Le Prince, French film pioneer
