= 1891 in film =

The following is an overview of the events of 1891 in film, including a list of films released and notable births.

== Events ==
- William K. L. Dickson, an assistant to Thomas Edison, supervises the construction of the first film studio, the Black Maria, in West Orange, New Jersey which produces many of the early Kinetoscope short films of the 1890s later seen in penny arcades the following year after the studio is completed.
- March – William K. L. Dickson successfully develops a working prototype of the Kinetoscope which moves horizontally.
- May 20 – First public display of Thomas Edison's prototype horizontal kinetoscope: Dickson Greeting is shown at Edison's Laboratory for a convention of the National Federation of Women's Clubs in West Orange, New Jersey.
- August 24 – Thomas Edison files for a patent for the motion picture camera (which he receives in 1897).

== Films produced in 1891 ==
Dickson Greeting

- Dickson Greeting, starring and directed by William K. L. Dickson.
- Duncan and Another, Blacksmith Shop, directed by William K. L. Dickson and William Heise and starring James C. Duncan.
- Duncan Smoking, directed by William K. L. Dickson and William Heise and starring James C. Duncan.
- Duncan or Devonald with Muslin Cloud, directed by William K. L. Dickson and William Heise and starring Fred C. Devonald and James C. Duncan.
- Men Boxing, directed by William K. L. Dickson and William Heise.
- Monkey and Another, Boxing, directed by William K. L. Dickson and William Heise.
- Newark Athlete, directed by William K. L. Dickson.
- Je vous aime, starring and directed by Georges Demenÿ

== Births ==
Month	Date	Name	Country	Profession	Died
January	15	Arne Weel	Denmark	Actor, director	1975
February	7	Ann Little	US	Actress	1984
February	9	Ronald Colman	UK	Actor	1958
February	26	Alan Bridge	US	Actor	1957
March	6	Victor Kilian	US	Actor	1979
March	6	Lidia Quaranta	Italy	Actress	1928
March	8	Sam Jaffe	US	Actor	1984
March	11	Gertrud Wolle	Germany	Actress	1952
March	31	Victor Varconi	Hungary	Actor	1976
April	2	Jack Buchanan	Scotland	Director, writer, actor	1957
April	10	Tim McCoy	US	Actor, soldier	1978
April	15	Wallace Reid	US	Actor	1923
April	23	Sergei Prokofiev	Russia	Composer	1953
May	13	Fritz Rasp	Germany	Actor	1976
June	24	Philippe Richard	France	Actor	1973
July	18	Gene Lockhart	Canada	Actor	1957
July	23	Harry Cohn	US	Co-founder of CBS Sales Association (Columbia Pictures)	1958
July	28	Joe E. Brown	US	Actor, Comedian	1973
July	28	Richard "Skeets" Gallagher	US	Actor	1955
August	4	Margit Makay	Hungary	Actress	1989
August	11	Helen Broderick	US	Actress	1959
August	28	Stanley Andrews	US	Actor	1969
November	10	Philip Sainton	France	Composer	1967
November	18	Vasil Gendov	Bulgaria	Actor, director, screenwriter	1970
November	20	Reginald Denny	UK	Actor, aviator	1967
