= The Barbershop =

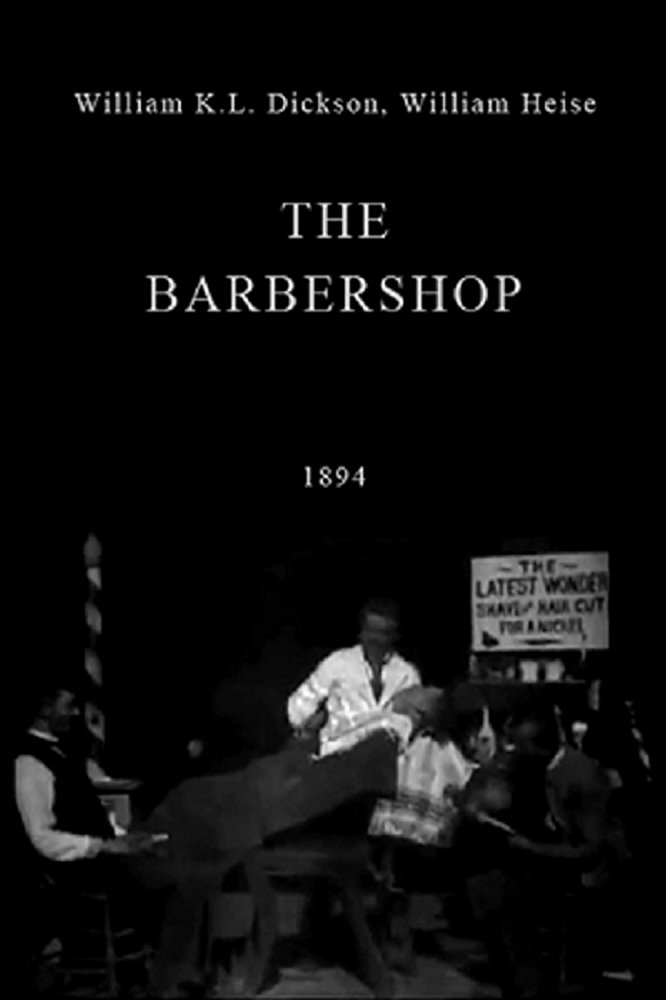
- Directed by: William K.L. Dickson and William Heise
- Production company: Edison Manufacturing Company
- Release date: 1894
- Running time: 22 seconds

The Barbershop is an 1894 American short narrative silent film directed by William K.L. Dickson and William Heise. It was produced by the Edison Manufacturing Company at the Black Maria Studio, in West Orange, New Jersey. The film was created for the Kinetoscope.

Barber Shop was the number three of ten films from the first Kinetoscope Parlor.

== Plot ==
In a barbershop, a barber gives a man an incredibly fast shave as two other men sit on each side of the chair.

The full film
