= Men Boxing =

- Directed by: William K. L. Dickson; William Heise
- Produced by: William K. L. Dickson; William Heise
- Cinematography: William K. L. Dickson; William Heise
- Production company: Edison Manufacturing Company
- Release date: 1891
- Running time: 5 seconds
- Country: United States
- Language: Silent

Men Boxing is an 1891 American short silent film, produced and directed by William K. L. Dickson and William Heise for the Edison Manufacturing Company, featuring two Edison employees with boxing gloves, pretending to spar in a boxing ring. The 12 feet of film was shot between May and June 1891 at the Edison Laboratory Photographic Building in West Orange, New Jersey, on the Edison-Dickson-Heise experimental horizontal-feed kinetograph camera and viewer, through a round aperture on 3/4 inch (19mm) wide film with a single edge row of sprocket perforations, as an experimental demonstration and was never publicly shown. A print has been preserved in the US Library of Congress film archive as part of the Gordon Hendricks collection.

== See also ==
- The Boxing Cats (Prof. Welton's), an 1894 film also directed by Dickson and Heise
