= Buffalo Dance (film) =

1894 silent film

- Directed by: William Kennedy Dickson
- Produced by: William Kennedy Dickson
- Starring: members of Sioux nation
- Cinematography: William Heise
- Distributed by: Edison Manufacturing Company
- Release date: 1894
- Running time: 16 seconds
- Country: United States
- Language: Silent English intertitles

Buffalo Dance is an 1894 American black-and-white silent film from Edison Studios, produced by William K. L. Dickson with William Heise as cinematographer. Filmed on a single reel, using standard 35 mm gauge, it has a 16-second runtime. The film, with English intertitles, was shot in Edison's Black Maria studio at the same time as Sioux Ghost Dance. These are two of the earliest films made which feature Native Americans. According to the Edison catalog, the performers in both films were Sioux people wearing traditional costumes and war paint. All were veterans of Buffalo Bill's Wild West show. Buffalo Dance has three dancers and two drummers. Hair Coat, Last Horse and Parts His Hair dance in a circle while drummers Pine and Strong Talker provide their rhythm.

Native Americans were among the first subjects of the new film media, with Thomas Edison recording Hopi Snake Dance for the Chicago world's fair in 1893, followed by Sioux Ghost Dance and Buffalo Dance in 1894, and later Indian Day School in 1894 and Indian Wars Refought in 1914. The silent film era crystalized stereotypical representations of Native Americans. Film historian Alex Bordino notes that films such as Buffalo Dance and Sioux Ghost Dance offered little, if any, educational value since they lacked any commentary. Instead, they gave viewers "a new kind of endlessly available tourist gaze for the masses, recycling contemporary racist modes of understanding 'exotic' cultures; and they challenged already prevailing notions of Native Americans as an extinct people relegated to dusty anthropological monographs and sepia-toned photographs".

== See also ==
- Kidnapping by Indians
- List of Western films before 1920
