= Leigh Sisters =

- Artist's impression of their umbrella dance

Background information
- Genres: burlesque, trilbyana, vaudeville
- Years active: 1890s
- Past members: Edna; Stella; Edwina; Lillie

The Leigh Sisters was a vaudeville act at the end of the 19th century in the United States.

The sisters were Edna and Stella Leigh who danced in a saucy style, exposing their legs more than was usual in those times. They were filmed by Alfred Clark for two Kinetoscope productions – Acrobatic Dance and Umbrella Dance in 1895. The films were hand coloured so we know that they were blondes, and the umbrella was purple. One had a pink skirt and the other was lime green or blue. The film was so popular that new versions were printed and hand coloured for the next five years. These early moving pictures have been lost but there is a frame from the latter in the Margaret Herrick Library.

In 1897, Stella retired and was replaced by Edwina. The act appeared as members of "The Alimony Club" in Little Miss Chicago, a burlesque at the Gaiety Theatre in Chicago.
