= Lola Yberri =

Mexican dancer

Lola Yberri was a Mexican dancer who performed in theatres in cities such as London and San Francisco in the early 20th century. While in New York, she took lessons from the ballet dancer Marie Bonfanti. In 1905, she appeared in two Kinetoscope moving pictures directed by Alfred Clark – Cyclone Dance and Fan Dance.
