= Annabelle Serpentine Dance =

1895 American short silent film

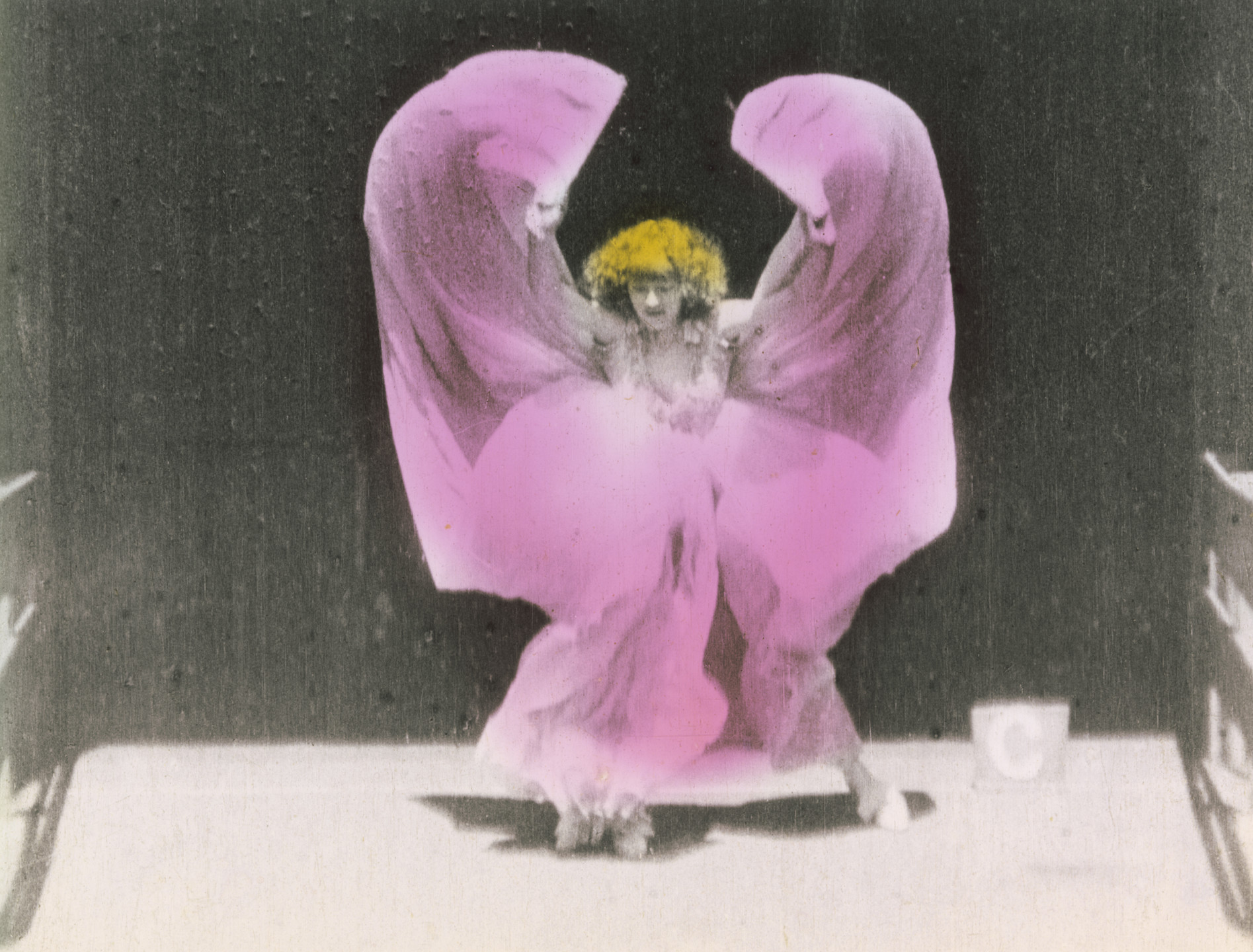
- Still image of the film.
- Directed by: William K.L. Dickson; William Heise
- Produced by: William Heise
- Starring: Annabelle Moore
- Production company: Edison Manufacturing Company
- Distributed by: Edison Manufacturing Company
- Release date: 1895
- Running time: 45 seconds
- Country: United States
- Language: Silent

Annabelle Serpentine Dance is a short silent American film produced and distributed by Edison Manufacturing Company in 1895. It is one of several released by the studio in the late 19th century. Each version of the short film depicts the popular serpentine dance performed by Annabelle Moore. Many of the prints were distributed in color, which was hand-tinted.

In 2024, the film was selected for preservation in the United States National Film Registry by the Library of Congress as being "culturally, historically, or aesthetically significant".

== Action in the film ==
Hand tinted version (1895).

The dance is performed in succession in a lockoff shot. The first is in a flowing skirt, held out by her hands with arms extended. She smiles, wearing butterfly wings on her back and the wings of Mercury in her hair. Her dance emphasizes the movement of her visible, bare legs. She kicks high, bows, and moves to her right and left. The second dancer has a voluminous, long skirt, and holds sticks in each hand attached to the skirt's outer edges. The flowing patterns of the skirt from her arm movements give the second scene a different feeling from the first.

== Production and distribution ==
Different versions of the film were released on four different dates: August 10, 1894; February 1895; April–August 1895; and May 8, 1897. The film was directed by William K.L. Dickson and William Heise. Heise was also producer and camera operator.

Film historians have commented on the possibilities for viewers to slow down the hand cranking of the footage; this was not technically possible in other art forms.

== See also ==
- Annabelle Butterfly Dance
