= Alfred Clark (director) =

Pioneer of cinema and gramophone, business executive and collector of ceramics

- Born: 19 December 1873; New York City, United States
- Died: 16 June 1950 (aged 76); Fulmer, England
- Education: City College of New York
- Occupations: cinematographer, gramophone inventor and executive

Alfred Clark (December 19, 1873 – June 16, 1950) was a pioneer of music recording and cinema. As a cameraman and director of productions at Thomas Edison's first studio, he was the first to make moving pictures with innovations like continuity, plot, trained actors, and special effects. In 1896, he joined Emile Berliner's Gramophone Company and then went to Europe, where he became an important manager of companies like His Master's Voice and EMI. He was naturalized as a British citizen in 1928 and became a leading member of the Oriental Ceramic Society in London, establishing a valuable collection, including rare pieces which had been made for the emperors of the Tang and Song dynasties.

In 1921 he married Ivy Sanders, who survived him and died in 1973.

== Early life ==
Alfred Clark was born in New York on 19 December 1876. He was educated at the Franklin School in Washington and the City College of New York. He took an early interest in electricity and left college at sixteen to join the North American Phonograph Company. This collapsed in 1894 and Clark then joined Thomas Edison to make early short movies using the Kinetoscope technology at the Black Maria studio. Previously, Edison's output had been boxing and vaudeville but Clark introduced the first productions with continuity and plot such as the brief Execution of Mary Stuart which introduced the first special effect to show her decapitation.

== Gramophone ==
Letter of introduction given to Clark by Edison to help him get established in Europe

Clark's main interest was sound recording so, after a year of pioneering cinema, he worked for Edison's phonograph company while taking evening classes at the Cooper Institute and collaborating with Emile Berliner and Eldridge Johnson on development of the gramophone – a superior technology to the phonograph, as it enabled mass production of recordings from a metal master. Clark's innovations included a governor to control the speed of playback and an improved sound box.

In 1899, Clark went to France, representing both Edison and Berliner. The gramophone technology did well, and Clark founded the Compagnie de Gramophone Française which recorded major artists such as Claude Debussy and Edvard Grieg. In 1904, Clark sold his French holdings for £23,000 and, in 1907, he helped establish the Musée de la Voix for which he was awarded the Legion of Honour. In 1908, he moved to Britain where he became the managing director of the Gramophone company there, reorganising it and establishing a factory in Hayes. The First World War was disruptive as the business had to focus on war work but Clark gained greater control of the company when the non-executive directors terminated his employment but found that the bank would not accept them as managers. Clark was rehired with better pay while the board was reorganised.

After the war, he developed the partnership with Eldridge Johnson's Victor Talking Machine Company and acquired the Marconiphone business for its new technologies of radio and electronics, which were now becoming important for home entertainment. In 1931, the business was merged with the Columbia Graphophone Company to form EMI. This focussed on cost-cutting and rationalisation to survive the Great Depression but continued to develop its technology, including television which the BBC started broadcasting using an EMI system in 1936. The Second World War interrupted such consumer developments as the business again had to switch to war work such as radar. Clark was the chairman and sometimes managing director during this period and he then retired in 1946.

== Chinese ceramics ==
Clark formed one of the most important Western collections of Chinese ceramics (though it was outshone by that of Sir Percival David). His first donation to the British Museum was a Ru ware brush-washer bowl in 1936; this was lent to an exhibition in the Palace Museum in Beijing in 2015–16. This was one of a pair; the other was later sold to a Japanese collection. When sold again, on 4 April 2012 by Sotheby's in Hong Kong, it fetched 207,860,000 Hong Kong dollars (US$26.7 million), an auction record for Song ceramics. Several other pieces from the Clark collection, including three Chinese paintings, were donated or sold to the British Museum, mostly by Mrs. Clark in 1972. There was a sale of much of the collection in 1956. The rest of the collection was sold or donated by his widow during the 1970s, but is recorded in a catalogue by Edgar Bluett, first published as a series of articles in Apollo magazine.

Clark was on the Council of the Oriental Ceramic Society for most of the period 1934–48, and lent several pieces to the important Royal Academy of Arts exhibition of Chinese art in 1935–36. As recalled by Lady David (wife of Sir Percival) in 1992, most of the collection was displayed in the living rooms, with a "little room upstairs" where their Song dynasty pieces were displayed. She described the collection as "small, formed by two people with extremely good taste".

== Filmography ==
These were the short films made for the Kinetoscope in 1895 at Edison's Black Maria studio.

=== Historical ===
The Execution of Mary Stuart is the only surviving historical work. It is now in the public domain and so can be viewed in full.

- A Frontier Scene
- Indian Scalping Scene
- Joan of Arc
- Rescue of Capt. John Smith by Pocahontas
- The Execution of Mary Stuart

=== Vaudeville ===
- Acrobatic Dance – the Leigh sisters
- Cyclone Dance – dancer Lola Yberri
- Fan Dance – dancer Lola Yberri
- Umbrella Dance – the Leigh sisters
