= The Boxing Cats (Prof. Welton's) =

- The entire film
- Directed by: William K.L. Dickson; William Heise
- Starring: Henry Welton and two of his cats
- Production company: Edison Manufacturing Company
- Release date: 1894
- Running time: 20 seconds at 27 fps
- Country: United States
- Language: Silent film

The Boxing Cats (Prof. Welton's), or simply Boxing Cats, is an 1894 American short silent film directed by William K.L. Dickson and William Heise, and starring Henry Welton. It depicts a boxing match between two cats, each wearing a pair of boxing gloves. The two cats were members of Welton's touring "cat circus", which reportedly also featured cats riding bicycles.

The Boxing Cats was filmed in Thomas Edison's Black Maria studio in West Orange, New Jersey, on 35 mm. The film has been described as a precursor to cat videos popular on the Internet.

== See also ==
- Men Boxing, an 1891 film also directed by Dickson and Heise
