= Blacksmith Scene =

Blacksmithing Scene
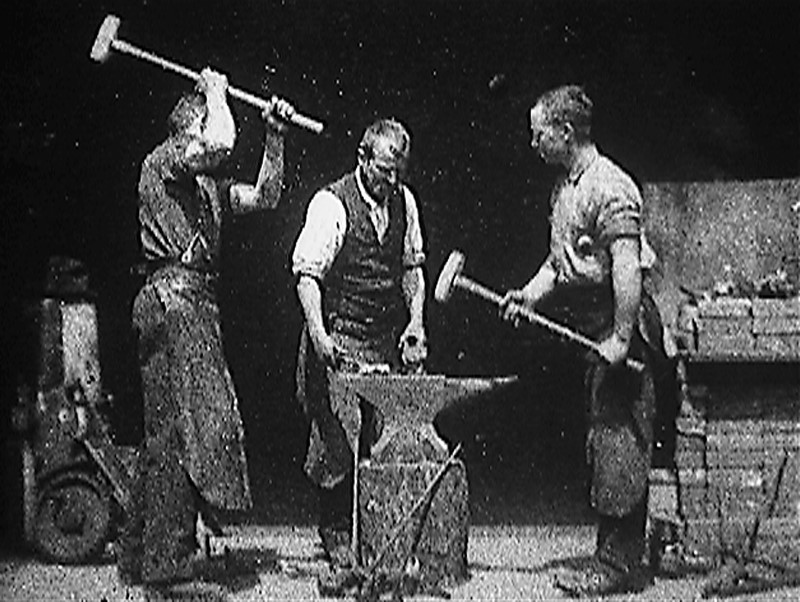
- Image from Blacksmithing Scene
- Directed by: William K.L. Dickson
- Starring: Charles Kayser
- Cinematography: William Heise
- Distributed by: Edison Manufacturing Company
- Release date: May 9, 1893
- Running time: 34 seconds
- Country: United States
- Language: Silent

Blacksmith Scene (1893)

Blacksmith Scene (also known as Blacksmith Scene #1 and Blacksmithing Scene) is an 1893 American short black-and-white silent film directed by William K.L. Dickson, the Scottish-French inventor who, while under the employ of Thomas Edison, developed one of the first fully functional motion picture cameras. It is historically significant as the first Kinetoscope film shown in public exhibition on May 9, 1893, and is the earliest known example of actors performing a role in a film. It was also the first U.S. motion picture film ever copyrighted that same year. 102 years later, in 1995, Blacksmithing Scene was selected for preservation in the United States National Film Registry by the Library of Congress as being "culturally, historically, or aesthetically significant". It is the second-oldest film included in the Registry, after Newark Athlete (1891).

== Production ==
The film was produced by the Edison Manufacturing Company, which had begun making films in 1890 under the direction of William K.L. Dickson. It was filmed entirely within the Black Maria studio at West Orange, New Jersey, in the United States, which is widely referred to as "America's First Movie Studio". It is believed to have been filmed in April 1893 and was shown publicly, in a Kinetoscope viewer, at the Brooklyn Institute on May 9, 1893.

According to the Internet Movie Database (IMDb), the film was made in a 35 mm format with an aspect ratio of 1.33:1. The movie was intended to be displayed on a Kinetoscope. Dickson selected a lens that worked best for medium shots and medium close-up shots and probably stationed his camera approximately ten to twelve feet from the anvil.

The men featured are not true blacksmiths, nor are they in a blacksmith shop working on metal: they are performers on a set mimicking blacksmiths and to have a drink in between. While the background is simply left black, the crew went through some trouble to bring in a real anvil, real sledgehammers and leather aprons.

== Cast ==
Actors	Characters
Charles Kayser	Blacksmith

== Awards and nominations ==
Year	Award	Category — Recipient(s)
1995	National Film Registry	National Film Registry

== Current status ==
A surviving 35-mm print of this film was found at the Henry Ford Museum; it is the source of the negative preserved by the Museum of Modern Art film archive. Another copy is at the Edison National Historic Site, administered by the National Park Service. Because the film was finished before 1925, its copyright has expired; it is freely available on the World Wide Web.

== See also ==
- Treasures from American Film Archives
