= Annabelle Butterfly Dance =

- Directed by: William Kennedy Dickson
- Produced by: Edison Manufacturing Company
- Starring: Annabelle Moore
- Distributed by: Continental Commerce Company
- Release date: 1894
- Running time: 40 seconds
- Country: United States
- Language: silent

Annabelle Butterfly Dance is an 1894 American short film. It is one of the several silent films produced by the Edison Manufacturing Company starring Annabelle Moore. In the film, Annabelle performs one of her popular dances while wearing a butterfly costume.

== See also ==
- Annabelle Serpentine Dance
