= Dickson Greeting =

1891 American film

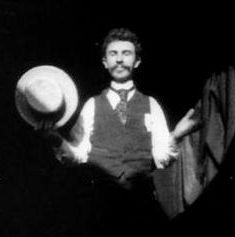
- Frame from the 1891 Dickson Greeting, featuring William K. L. Dickson, in the first American film shown to a public audience.
- Directed by: William K. L. Dickson
- Produced by: William K. L. Dickson; William Heise
- Starring: William K. L. Dickson
- Cinematography: William Heise
- Release date: May 20, 1891
- Running time: 3 seconds
- Country: United States
- Language: Silent

Dickson Greeting is an 1891 American short silent film. Directed, produced by, and starring motion-picture pioneer William K. L. Dickson, it displays a 3-second clip of him passing a hat in front of himself, and reaching for it with his other hand. It was filmed on May 20, 1891 in the Photographic Building at Edison's Black Maria studio, West Orange, New Jersey, in collaboration with Thomas Edison using his kinetograph. The film was played for viewers at the National Federation of Women's Clubs, one of the first public presentations of a motion picture.

Dickson Greeting (1891)
