= Bucking Broncho =

1894 film

- Directed by: William Kennedy Dickson
- Produced by: William Kennedy Dickson
- Starring: Lee Martin, Frank Hammitt
- Cinematography: William Heise
- Distributed by: Edison Manufacturing Company
- Release date: 1894
- Running time: 32 seconds
- Country: United States
- Languages: Silent; English intertitles

Bucking Broncho is an 1894 American black-and-white silent film from Edison Studios, produced by William K. L. Dickson with William Heise as cinematographer. Filmed on a single reel, using standard 35 mm gauge, it has a 32-second runtime. One of the earliest known films in the Western genre, it is preserved by the Academy of Motion Picture Arts and Sciences and available in the DVD collection More Treasures from American Film Archives (2004).

The film features Lee Martin who was an actual cowboy "bronco rider" and a member of Buffalo Bill's Wild West show. Martin's part was uncredited and it was his only film. Also appearing is Frank Hammitt, another star of the show, who is standing on the fence and firing his revolver. The film is a demonstration of Martin's expert horse riding before a crowd of onlookers although the horse, who was called Sunfish, unseats him at the end of the clip.

== See also ==
- List of Western films before 1920
