= Newark Athlete =

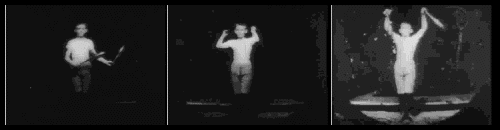
- Directed by: William K.L. Dickson
- Produced by: William K.L. Dickson
- Production company: Edison's Black Maria
- Distributed by: Edison Studios
- Release date: 1891
- Running time: 12 seconds
- Country: United States
- Language: Silent

Newark Athlete

Newark Athlete is an 1891 American short silent film directed and produced by William Kennedy Dickson. The film, roughly 12 seconds in length, displays a young athlete swinging Indian clubs. The identity of the athlete is unknown. It was filmed in May or June 1891, in the Photographic Building at the Edison Laboratory, West Orange, New Jersey. The firm's Black Maria studio building was not constructed until late 1892 or early 1893. The film was made to be viewed using Thomas Edison's Kinetoscope.

In 2010, Newark Athlete was selected for preservation in the United States National Film Registry by the Library of Congress as being "culturally, historically, or aesthetically significant". It is currently the oldest film chosen to be in the Registry.
