= Monkeyshines =

1889 short silent film

- Monkeyshines No. 1 and 2
- Directed by: William K. L. Dickson; William Heise
- Starring: Fred Ott; Giuseppe Sacco Albanese
- Release date: 1889
- Running time: 56 seconds (No. 1 and 2)
- Country: United States
- Language: Silent

Monkeyshines is a series of experimental short silent films made to test the original cylinder format of the Kinetoscope; those films are believed to be the first to be shot in the United States.

Monkeyshines, No. 1 was shot by William K. L. Dickson and William Heise for the Edison labs. Scholars have differing opinions on whether the first was shot in June 1889 starring Fred Ott or at some time between November 21–27, 1890, starring Giuseppe Sacco Albanese. Both men were fellow lab workers at the company; contradictory evidence exists for each claim. Monkeyshines, No. 2 and Monkeyshines, No. 3 quickly followed to test further conditions.

These films were intended to be internal tests of the new camera system, and were not created for commercial use; their rise to prominence resulted much later due to work by film historians. All three films show a blurry figure in white standing in one place making large gestures and are only a few seconds long.Monkeyshines No. 3 has disappeared and may be lost.
