= Gordon Hendricks =

American historian (1917–1980)

Gordon Hendricks (1917–1980) was an American art and film historian.

In 1961 Hendricks published The Edison Motion Picture Myth in which he showed that it was not Thomas Alva Edison who should be attributed with the invention of the first device for cinema screenings, but in fact William Kennedy Laurie Dickson. The publication of Beginnings of the Biograph followed shortly after in 1964. In 1966, Hendricks published, The Kinetoscope. These books became milestones in the writing of film history. Hendricks was the first motion picture specialist to lecture in the Sunday series at the Metropolitan Museum of Art. He was the first to show motion pictures in the Great Hall at Cooper Union.

In 1975 he authored a work, republished in 2001, about Eadweard Muybridge, in which he called Muybridge the father of the cinema.

Hendricks then began a series on books on painters and photographers. He published works about Winslow Homer and Albert Bierstadt. He also published The Photographs of Thomas Eakins. He has 16 volumes of his writings in the Library of Congress.

At the time of his death, Hendricks was engaged in writing a book about the art of Thomas Cole.

After his death Hendricks bequeathed two major collections to the Archives of American Art: one about Thomas Eakins, the other about film history.

== Works ==
- The Edison Motion Picture Myth. Berkeley: University of California Press, 1961. 216 pp.
- Beginnings of the Biograph: The Story of the Invention of the Mutoscope and the Biograph and their Supplying Camera. New York: Beginnings of the American Film, 1964. 78 pp.
- Thomas Eakins: His Photographic Works. [Preface by Hendricks.] Philadelphia: Pennsylvania Academy of the Fine Arts, 1969. 78 pp. The Photographs of Thomas Eakins. New York: Grossman Publishers, 1972. 214 pp.
- Albert Bierstadt, 1830-1902 : [exhibition catalog] September 15-October 10, 1972. New York: M. Knoedler [1972]. 26 pp.
- ABierstadt; an essay and catalogue to accompany a retrospective exhibition of the work of Albert Bierstadt. Fort Worth: Amon Carter Museum [1972]. 48 pp.
- Albert Bierstadt Painter of the American West. New York: H. N. Abrams [1974]. Published in association with the Amon Carter Museum of Western Art. 360 pp.
- The Life and Work of Thomas Eakins. New York: Grossman Publishers, 1974. 367 pp.
- Eadweard Muybridge: The Father of the Motion Picture. New York: Grossman Publishers, 1975. 271 pp.
- The Life and Work of Winslow Homer. New York: H. N. Abrams, 1979. 345 pp.
