= Dancing Darkies =

- Directed by: William K.L. Dickson
- Produced by: William K.L. Dickson
- Distributed by: Edison Manufacturing Company
- Release date: 1896
- Country: United States
- Language: Silent

Dancing Darkies is an 1896 American, short, black-and-white, silent documentary film shot by William K.L. Dickson.
