= Rip Van Winkle (1903 film) =

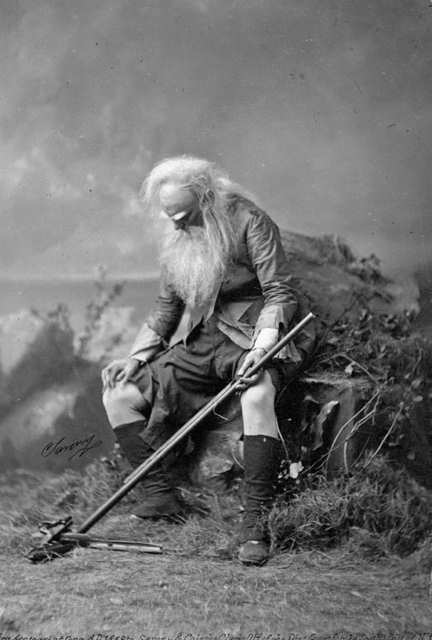
- Joseph Jefferson as Rip Van Winkle (1896)
- Directed by: William K.L. Dickson
- Written by: William K.L. Dickson; Joseph Jefferson; Dion Boucicault; Washington Irving
- Based on: Rip Van Winkle by Washington Irving
- Starring: Joseph Jefferson
- Cinematography: G.W. Bitzer
- Production company: American Mutoscope and Biograph Co.
- Release dates: September 1896 (Original release); May 1903 (Single feature release)
- Country: United States
- Language: Silent

Rip Van Winkle (1903)

Rip Van Winkle is an 1896 series of American short black-and-white silent films and later a compilation film in 1903. It was written and directed by William K.L. Dickson. It is adapted from the play by his friend and investor Joseph Jefferson with Dion Boucicault based on the 1819 story of the same name by Washington Irving.

== Plot ==
The film features Joseph Jefferson as a ne'er-do-well, who wanders off one day into the Catskill Mountains, where he meets a group of odd men. He drinks some of their mysterious brew and passes out. When he wakes up, he finds that 20 years have passed. The film is compiled from a series of films produced in 1896, which consisted of:

- Rip's Toast (AM&B Cat. #45)
- Rip Meets the Dwarf (AM&B Cat. #46)
- Rip and the Dwarf
- Rip Leaving Sleepy Hollow (AM&B Cat. #52)
- Rip's Toast to Hudson and Crew
- Rip's Twenty Years' Sleep (AM&B Cat. #50)
- Awakening of Rip
- Rip Passing Over Hill

These films were selected together for preservation in the National Film Registry by the Library of Congress in 1995 and featured on the DVD release More Treasures from American Film Archives, 1894-1931.

== Production ==
The serial—filmed at Joseph Jefferson's summer home in Buzzards Bay, Massachusetts in August 1896—was filmed in wide shot with a one or two camera setup in 68 mm format with an aspect ratio of 1.36:1. American Mutoscope and Biograph Co. registered the copyright on February 4, 1897. The actor selected scenes that were largely pantomimed, eliminating the need for explanatory titles.

== Release ==
The series was one of the films American Mutoscope offered to customers who purchased their projectors in September 1896. Exhibitors had the option of purchasing any or all of the eight scenes and were free to display them in any order. The films were so popular that the production company (which changed its name to the Biograph Company) edited the scenes into a single feature in 1903. Thanks to hit films like The Kiss (1896), Biograph became one of the most popular studios in the United States.
