= McKinley at Home, Canton, Ohio =

- Produced by: American Mutoscope and Biograph Company
- Starring: William McKinley; Ida Saxton McKinley; George Cortelyou
- Release date: September 1896
- Country: United States
- Languages: Silent film English intertitles

McKinley at Home, Canton, Ohio a.k.a. William McKinley at Canton, Ohio is a silent film reenactment of William McKinley receiving the Republican nomination for President of the United States in September 1896. The actual nomination had been several weeks earlier. McKinley is shown emerging from his house to receive the news from his secretary George Cortelyou. His wife Ida can be seen in a rocking chair on the porch. McKinley is seen removing his hat and wiping his forehead with a handkerchief after receiving the news. It was filmed by a two-man crew for American Mutoscope and Biograph Company on 68 mm film, 60.02 m in length. McKinley's brother Abner and former US president Benjamin Harrison were stockholders in the film company.

== See also ==
- Execution of Czolgosz with Panorama of Auburn Prison
- American Mutoscope and Biograph Company
- Silent films
- William McKinley
- Ida Saxton McKinley
- George Cortelyou
