= Fred Ott's Sneeze =

1894 American short silent film

- The full film
- Directed by: William K.L. Dickson
- Produced by: William K.L. Dickson
- Starring: Fred Ott
- Distributed by: Edison Manufacturing Company
- Release date: January 7, 1894
- Running time: approximately 5 seconds
- Country: United States
- Language: Silent

Fred Ott's Sneeze (also known as Edison Kinetoscopic Record of a Sneeze) is an 1894 short, black-and-white silent film shot by William K.L. Dickson and featuring Fred Ott. According to the Library of Congress, it is the second oldest surviving U.S. motion picture to be copyrighted, although it has since entered the public domain.

The film was shot on January 7, 1894; however the film's copyright was filed two days later. In the approximately five-second film, one of Thomas Edison's assistants, Fred Ott, takes a pinch of snuff and sneezes. According to the Library of Congress, the film was "made for publicity purposes, as a series of still photographs to accompany an article in Harper's Weekly." The published Harper's Weekly version is slightly longer than what now survives on film, and depicts a second sneeze.

In 2015, the film was selected for preservation in the National Film Registry by the Library of Congress as being "culturally, historically, or aesthetically significant."

== Production ==
The film was produced by the Edison Manufacturing Company, which had begun making films in 1890 under the direction of Dickson, one of the earliest film pioneers. It was filmed within the Black Maria studio at West Orange, New Jersey, which was the first U.S. movie studio. It was filmed between January 2, 1894, and January 7, 1894 and was displayed, at the time, on Kinetoscope.

== Current status ==
45 paper prints made from individual frames of the film.

As a film published in the United States before 1978 and more than 95 years ago, its copyright expired and the work is in the public domain in the United States. In countries where copyright expires 70 years after the author's death, the copyright of the film expired in 2006. Originally, the film was submitted to the Library of Congress as a "paper print" (a photographic record of each frame of the film) for copyright purposes. A digital copy is now kept by the Library of Congress and can be viewed on their American Memory website. This short film was featured at the 30th Annual Academy Awards, and was included as part of the TV documentary, The First 100 Years: A Celebration of American Movies. There was an audio recording of the sneeze but it has since been lost.

== See also ==
- 1894 in film
- Sneeze
- The Horse in Motion
