= Annabelle Moore =

American actress

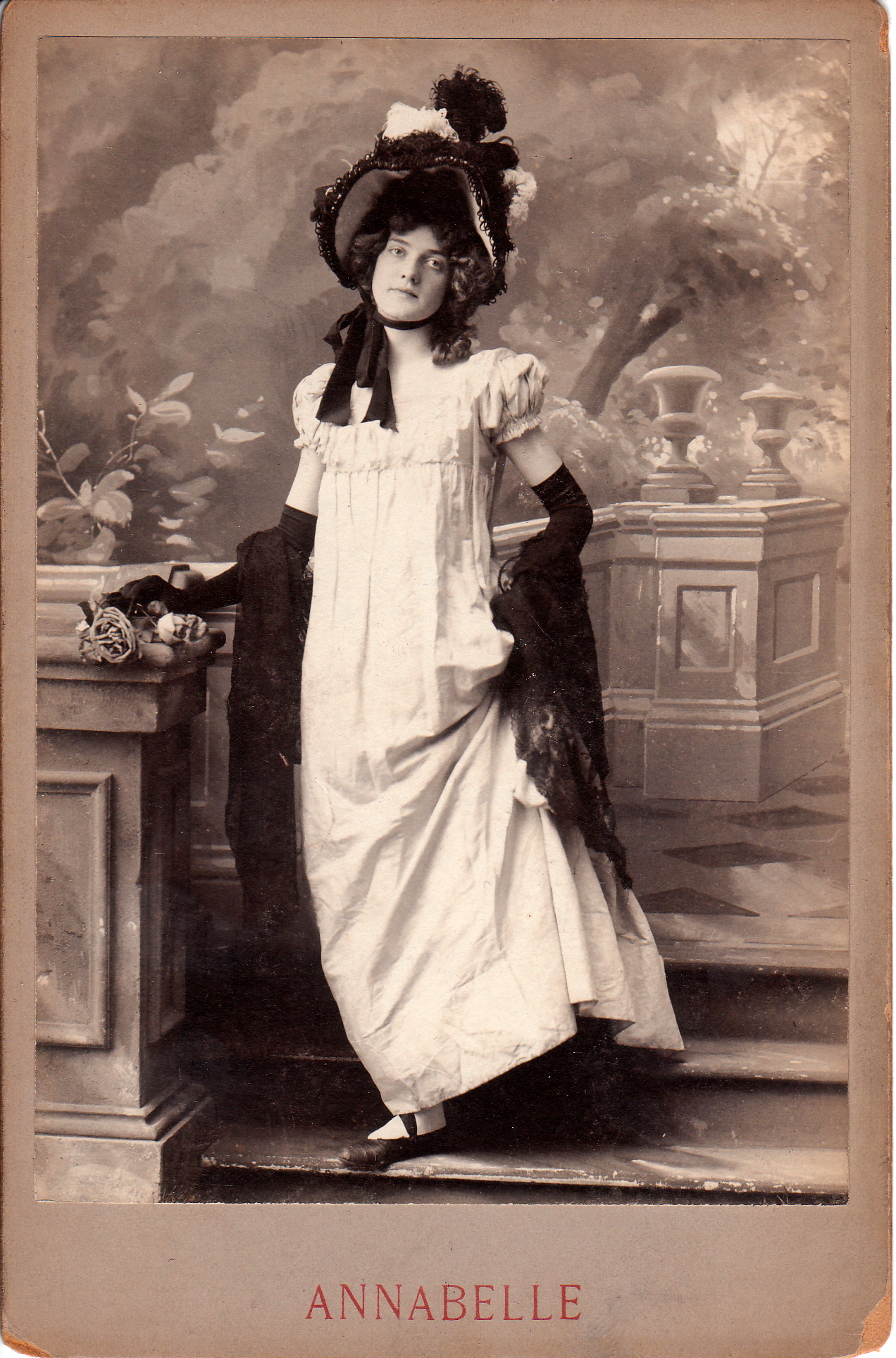
- Whitford in 1895
- Born: Annabella Whitford; July 6, 1878; Chicago, Illinois, U.S.
- Died: November 29, 1961 (aged 83); Chicago, Illinois, U.S.
- Spouse: Edward James Buchan (m. 1910; died 1958)
- Writing career
- Notable work: Annabelle Serpentine Dance

Annabelle Moore (born Annabella Whitford, July 6, 1878 – November 29, 1961), also known as Peerless Annabelle, was an American dancer and actress who appeared in numerous early silent films. She was the original Gibson Girl in the 1907 Ziegfeld Follies.

== Life and career ==
Hand tinted version (1895) of Annabelle Serpentine Dance

Annabelle Whitford was born in Chicago. She made her debut at age 15 dancing at the World's Columbian Exposition in Chicago in 1893. She later moved to New York City, where she performed in several films for the Edison Studios and appeared on Broadway.

Annabelle was quite popular in her youth. The sale of her films was further boosted in December 1896 when it was revealed that she had been approached to appear naked at a private dinner party at Sherry's Restaurant. It was said she introduced eroticism in film.

She married Edward James Buchan in 1910. He died in 1958.

Although she was very popular before her marriage, Annabelle died penniless in Chicago in 1961.

== Selected filmography ==
Year	Title	Role	Notes
1894	Annabelle Butterfly Dance	Self (as Annabelle)	Short film
1894	Annabelle Sun Dance	Self (as Annabelle)	Short film
1894	Annabelle Serpentine Dance	Self	Short film
1895	Annabelle Serpentine Dance, no 2	No	Short film
1895	Annabelle Serpentine Dance	Self (as Annabelle)	Short film
1896	Butterfly Dance	Self (as Annabelle)	Short film
1896	Annabelle in Flag Dance	Self	Short film
1896	Serpentine Dance by Annabelle	Self	Short film
1896	Tambourine Dance by Annabelle	Self	Short film
1897	Butterfly Dance	Self	Short film
1897	Serpentine Dance, Annabelle	Self	Short film
1897	Sun Dance – Annabelle	Self	Short film
1902	A Mermaid Dance	Mermaid (as Annabelle)	Short film
1998	Glorious Technicolor	Self – Dancer (as Annebelle)	Archive Footage, posthumously release, TV movie
2003	Sex at 24 Frames Per Second	Self	Archive Footage, uncredited, posthumously release
2013	The Quiet Room: A Story of Cinema	Self	Archive Footage, posthumously release

== Other work ==
- The Charity Girl (1912)
- The Happiest Night of His Life (1911)
- Ziegfeld Follies of 1909 (in scene with Grace La Rue, Nora Bayes and Lucy Weston)
- Ziegfeld Follies of 1908
- The Belle of Mayfair (1906)
- A Venetian Romance (1904)
- The Sleeping Beauty and the Beast (1901)
- The Sprightly Romance of Marsac (1900)
