= Kinetoscope =

Motion picture exhibition device

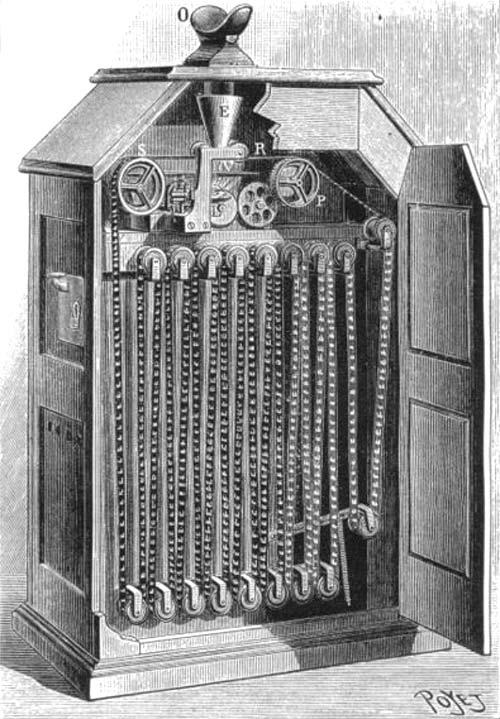
Interior view of Kinetoscope with peephole viewer at top of cabinet

The Kinetoscope is an early motion picture exhibition device, designed for films to be viewed by one person at a time through a peephole viewer window. The Kinetoscope was not a movie projector, but it introduced the basic approach that would become the standard for all cinematic projection before the advent of video: it created the illusion of movement by conveying a strip of perforated film bearing sequential images over a light source with a high-speed shutter. First described in conceptual terms by U.S. inventor Thomas Edison in 1888, it was largely developed by his employee William Kennedy Laurie Dickson between 1889 and 1892. Dickson and his team at the Edison lab in New Jersey also devised the Kinetograph, an innovative motion picture camera with rapid intermittent, or stop-and-go, film movement, to photograph movies for in-house experiments and, eventually, commercial Kinetoscope presentations.

A Kinetoscope prototype was first semipublicly demonstrated to members of the National Federation of Women's Clubs invited to the Edison laboratory on May 20, 1891. The completed version was publicly unveiled in Brooklyn two years later, and on April 14, 1894, the first commercial exhibition of Kinetoscopes took place in New York City, with 10 different films. In 1895, Edison introduced the Kinetophone, which joined the Kinetoscope with a cylinder phonograph. Film projection, which Edison initially disdained as financially nonviable, soon superseded the Kinetoscope's individual exhibition model. Numerous motion picture systems developed by Edison's firm in later years were marketed with the name Projecting Kinetoscope.

== Development ==
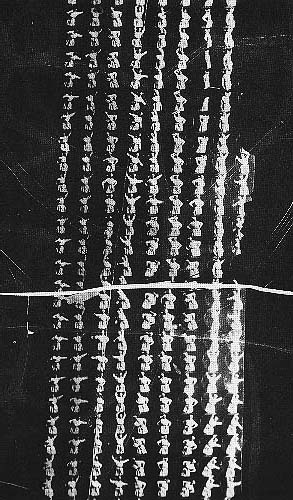
Sheet of images from one of the three Monkeyshines films (c. 1889–90) produced as tests of an early version of the Kinetoscope

An encounter with the work and ideas of photographic pioneer Eadweard Muybridge appears to have spurred Thomas Edison to pursue the development of a motion picture system. On February 25, 1888, in Orange, New Jersey, Muybridge gave a lecture amid a tour in which he demonstrated his zoopraxiscope, a device that projected sequential images drawn around the edge of a glass disc, producing the illusion of motion. Edison's laboratory was close by, and either or both Edison and his company's official photographer, William Dickson, may have attended. Two days later, Muybridge and Edison met at the Edison lab in West Orange and discussed the possibility of joining the zoopraxiscope with the Edison phonograph—a combination system that would play sound and images concurrently. No such collaboration was undertaken, but in October 1888, Edison filed a preliminary claim, known as a caveat, with the U.S. Patent Office announcing his plans to create a device that would do "for the Eye what the phonograph does for the Ear". It is clear that it was intended as part of a complete audiovisual system: "we may see & hear a whole Opera as perfectly as if actually present". In March 1889, a second caveat was filed, in which the proposed motion picture device was given a name, Kinetoscope, derived from the Greek roots kineto- ('movement') and scopos ('to view').

Edison assigned Dickson, one of his most talented employees, to the job of making the Kinetoscope a reality. Edison would take full credit for the invention, but the historiographical consensus is that the title of creator can hardly go to one man:

While Edison seems to have conceived the idea and initiated the experiments, Dickson apparently performed the bulk of the experimentation, leading most modern scholars to assign Dickson with the major credit for turning the concept into a practical reality. The Edison laboratory, though, worked as a collaborative organization. Laboratory assistants were assigned to work on many projects while Edison supervised and involved himself and participated to varying degrees.

Dickson and his then lead assistant, Charles Brown, made halting progress at first. Edison's original idea involved recording pinpoint photographs, 1/32 of an inch wide, directly on to a cylinder (also referred to as a "drum"); the cylinder, made of an opaque material for positive images or of glass for negatives, was coated in collodion to provide a photographic base. An audio cylinder would provide synchronized sound, while the rotating images, hardly operatic in scale, were viewed through a microscope-like tube. When tests were made with images expanded to a mere 1/8 of an inch in width, the coarseness of the silver bromide emulsion used on the cylinder became unacceptably apparent. Around June 1889, the lab began working with sensitized celluloid sheets, supplied by John Carbutt, that could be wrapped around the cylinder, providing a far superior base for the recording of photographs. The first film made for the Kinetoscope, and apparently the first motion picture ever produced on photographic film in the United States, may have been shot at this time (there is an unresolved debate over whether it was made in June 1889 or November 1890); known as Monkeyshines, No. 1, it shows an employee of the lab in an apparently tongue-in-cheek display of physical dexterity. Attempts at synchronizing sound were soon left behind, while Dickson would also experiment with disc-based exhibition designs.

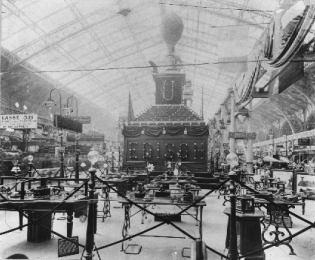
An acre in size, Edison's exhibit at the Exposition Universelle included an entire electrical power station.

The project would soon head off in more productive directions, largely impelled by a trip of Edison's to Europe and the Exposition Universelle in Paris, for which he departed August 2 or 3, 1889. During his two months abroad, Edison visited with scientist-photographer Étienne-Jules Marey, who had devised a "chronophotographic gun"—the first portable motion picture camera—which used a strip of flexible film designed to capture sequential images at 12 frames per second. Upon his return to the United States, Edison filed another patent caveat, on November 2, which described a Kinetoscope based not just on a flexible filmstrip, but one in which the film was perforated to allow for its engagement by sprockets, making its mechanical conveyance much more smooth and reliable. The first motion picture system to employ a perforated image band was apparently the Théâtre Optique, patented by French inventor Charles-Émile Reynaud in 1888. Reynaud's system did not use photographic film, but images painted on gelatine frames. At the Exposition Universelle, Edison would have seen both the Théâtre Optique and the electrical tachyscope of German inventor Ottamar Anschütz. This disc-based projection device, also known as the Schnellseher ("quick viewer"), is often referred to as an important conceptual source for the development of the Kinetoscope. Its crucial innovation was using electric flashes to illuminate each of the many minutely different stages of a photographed activity. By late 1890, intermittent visibility would be integral to the Kinetoscope's design.

The question of when the Edison lab began working on a filmstrip device is a matter of historical debate. According to Dickson, in mid-1889, he began cutting the stiff celluloid sheets supplied by Carbutt into strips for use in such a prototype machine; in August, by his description, he attended a demonstration of George Eastman's new flexible film and was given a roll by an Eastman representative, which was immediately applied to experiments with the prototype. As described by historian Marta Braun, Eastman's product

was sufficiently strong, thin, and pliable to permit the intermittent movement of the film strip behind [a camera] lens at considerable speed and under great tension without tearing ... stimulat[ing] the almost immediate solution of the essential problems of cinematic invention.

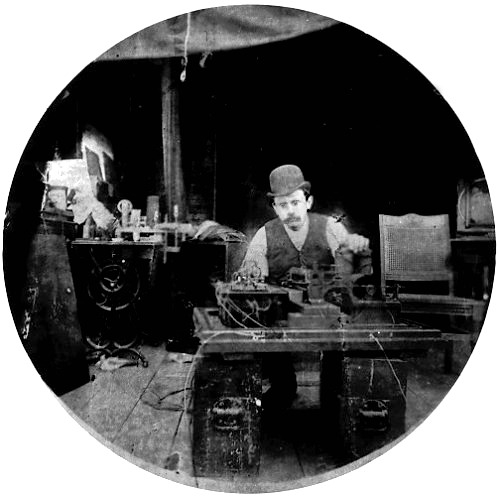
Charles Kayser of the Edison lab seated behind the Kinetograph. The camera was not easily portable.

Some scholars—in particular, Gordon Hendricks, in The Edison Motion Picture Myth (1961)—have argued that the lab began working on a filmstrip machine much later and that Dickson and Edison misrepresented the date to establish priority for reasons of both patent protection and intellectual status. In any event, though film historian David Robinson claims that "the cylinder experiments seem to have been carried on to the bitter end" (meaning the final months of 1890), as far back as September 1889—while Edison was still in Europe, but corresponding regularly with Dickson—the lab definitely placed its first order with the Eastman company for roll film. Three more orders for roll film were placed over the next five months.

Only sporadic work was done on the Kinetoscope for much of 1890 as Dickson concentrated on Edison's unsuccessful venture into ore milling—between May and November, no expenses at all were billed to the lab's Kinetoscope account. By early 1891, however, Dickson and his new chief assistant, William Heise, had succeeded in devising a functional strip-based film viewing system. In the new design, whose mechanics were housed in a wooden cabinet, a loop of horizontally configured 3/4 inch (19 mm) film ran around a series of spindles. The film, with a single row of perforations engaged by an electrically powered sprocket wheel, was drawn continuously beneath a magnifying lens. An electric lamp shone up from beneath the film, casting its circular-format images onto the lens and thence through a peephole atop the cabinet. The device incorporated a rapidly spinning shutter whose purpose—as described by Robinson in his discussion of the completed version—was to "permi[t] a flash of light so brief that [each] frame appeared to be frozen. This rapid series of apparently still frames appeared, thanks to the persistence of vision phenomenon, as a moving image." The lab also developed a motor-powered camera, the Kinetograph, capable of shooting with the new sprocketed film. To govern the intermittent movement of the film in the camera, allowing the strip to stop long enough so each frame could be fully exposed and then advancing it quickly (in about 1/460 of a second) to the next frame, the sprocket wheel that engaged the strip was driven by an escapement disc mechanism—the first practical system for the high-speed stop-and-go film movement that would be the foundation for the next century of cinematography.

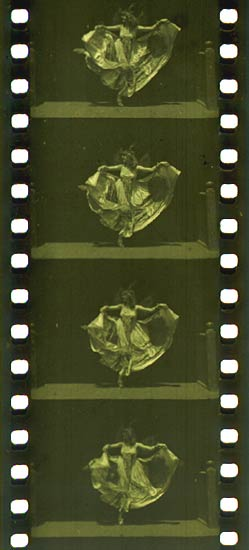
1 3/8–inch (35 mm) filmstrip of the Edison production Butterfly Dance (c. 1894–95), featuring Annabelle Whitford Moore, in the format that would become standard for motion picture photography around the world.

On May 20, 1891, the first invitational demonstration of a prototype Kinetoscope was given at the laboratory for approximately 150 members of the National Federation of Women's Clubs. The New York Sun described what the club women saw in the "small pine box" they encountered:

In the top of the box was a hole perhaps an inch in diameter. As they looked through the hole they saw the picture of a man. It was a most marvelous picture. It bowed and smiled and waved its hands and took off its hat with the most perfect naturalness and grace. Every motion was perfect....

The man was Dickson; the little movie, approximately three seconds long, is now referred to as Dickson Greeting. On August 24, three detailed patent applications were filed: the first for a "Kinetographic Camera", the second for the camera as well, and the third for an "Apparatus for Exhibiting Photographs of Moving Objects". In the first Kinetograph application, Edison stated, "I have been able to take with a single camera and a tape-film as many as forty-six photographs per second...but I do not wish to limit the scope of my invention to this high rate of speed...since with some subjects a speed as low as thirty pictures per second or even lower is sufficient." Indeed, according to the Library of Congress archive, based on data from a study by historian Charles Musser, Dickson Greeting and at least two other films made with the Kinetograph in 1891 were shot at 30 frames per second or even slower. The Kinetoscope application also included a plan for a stereoscopic film projection system that was apparently abandoned.

Early in 1892, steps began to make coin operation, via a nickel slot, part of the mechanics of the viewing system. Before the end of the year, the design of the Kinetoscope was essentially complete. The filmstrip, based on stock manufactured first by Eastman, and then, from April 1893, by New York's Blair Camera Co., was 1 3/8 inches wide; each vertically sequenced frame bore a rectangular image, 1 inch wide by 3/4 inch high, and four perforations on each side. Within a few years, this basic format—with the gauge known by its metric equivalent, 35 mm—would be adopted globally as the standard for motion picture film, which it remains to this day. The publication in the October 1892 Phonogram of cinematographic sequences shot in the format demonstrates that the Kinetograph had already been reconfigured to produce movies with the new film.

As for the Kinetoscope itself, there have been differing descriptions of the location of the shutter providing the crucial intermittent visibility effect. According to a report by inventor Herman Casler described as "authoritative" by Hendricks, who personally examined five of the six still-extant first-generation devices, "Just above the film,...a shutter wheel having five spokes and a very small rectangular opening in the rim [rotates] directly over the film. An incandescent lamp...is placed below the film...and the light passes up through the film, shutter opening, and magnifying lens...to the eye of the observer placed at the opening in the top of the case." Robinson, on the other hand, says the shutter—which he agrees has only a single slit—is positioned lower, "between the lamp and film". The Casler–Hendricks description is supported by the diagrams of the Kinetoscope that accompany the 1891 patent application, in particular, diagram 2. A side view, it does not illustrate the shutter, but it shows the impossibility of it fitting between the lamp and the film without a major redesign and indicates a space that seems suitable for it between the film strip and the lens. Evidently, that major redesign took place, as Robinson's description is confirmed by photographs of multiple Kinetoscope interiors, two among the holdings of The Henry Ford and one that appears in Hendricks's own book.

On February 21, 1893, a patent was issued for the system that governed the intermittent movement of film in the Kinetograph (though one was not granted for a version of the camera as a whole until 1897). The escapement-based mechanism would be superseded within a few years by competing systems, in particular those based on the so-called Geneva drive or "Maltese cross" that would become the norm for both movie cameras and projectors. The exhibition device itself—which, despite erroneous accounts to the contrary, never employed intermittent film movement, only intermittent lighting or viewing—was finally awarded its patent, number 493,426, on March 14. The Kinetoscope was ready to be unveiled.

== Going public ==
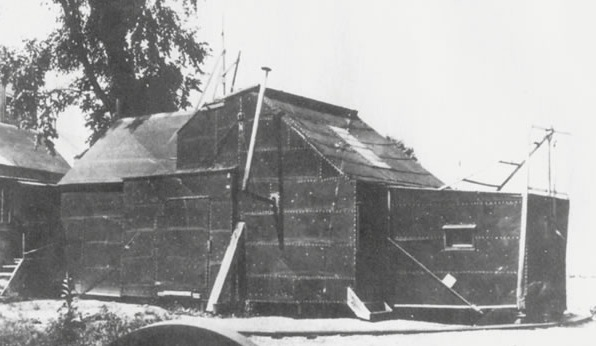
Construction of the imposing Black Maria began in December 1892. To take full advantage of sunlight, the tar paper–lined studio was equipped with a hinged, flip-up roof and the entire structure could rotate on a track. "It obeys no architectural rules," declared Dickson, who found it "productive of the happiest effects in the films."

The premiere of the completed Kinetoscope was held not at the Chicago World's Fair, as originally scheduled, but at the Brooklyn Institute of Arts and Sciences on May 9, 1893. The first film publicly shown on the system was Blacksmith Scene (also known as Blacksmiths); directed by Dickson and shot by Heise, it was produced at the new Edison moviemaking studio, the world's first, known as the Black Maria. Despite extensive promotion, a major display of the Kinetoscope, involving as many as twenty-five machines, never took place at the Chicago exposition. Kinetoscope production had been delayed in part because of Dickson's absence of more than eleven weeks early in the year with a nervous breakdown. Hendricks, referring to various accounts, including ones in the July 22 Science and the October 21 Scientific American, argues that one Kinetoscope did make it to the fair. Robinson, in contrast, argues that such "speculation" is "conclusively dismissed by an 1894 leaflet issued for the launching of the invention in London," which states, "the Kinetoscope was not perfected in time for the great Fair." Echoing Hendricks's position, fair historian Stanley Appelbaum states, "Doubt has been cast on the reports of [the Kinetoscope's] actual presence at the fair, but these reports are numerous and circumstantial." Noting that the fair featured up to two dozen Anschütz Schnellsehers—some or all of a peephole, not projection, variety—film historian Deac Rossell asserts that their presence "is the reason that so many historical sources were confused for so long.... [A]nyone who made a clear claim to see the Kinetoscope undoubtedly saw the Schnellseher under its deliberately deceptive name of The Electrical Wonder."

The first U.S. copyright for an identifiable motion picture was given to Edison for Fred Ott's Sneeze.

Work proceeded, though slowly, on the Kinetoscope project. On October 6, a U.S. copyright was issued for a "publication" received by the Library of Congress consisting of "Edison Kinetoscopic Records." It remains unclear what film was awarded this, the first motion picture copyright in North America. By the turn of the year, the Kinetoscope project would be reenergized. During the first week of January 1894, a five-second film starring an Edison technician was shot at the Black Maria; Fred Ott's Sneeze, as it is now widely known, was made expressly to produce a sequence of images for an article in Harper's magazine. Never intended for exhibition, it would become one of the most famous Edison films and the first identifiable motion picture to receive a U.S. copyright. With commercial exploitation close at hand, on April 1, the motion picture operation was formally made the Kinetograph Department of the Edison Manufacturing Company, for which Edison appointed a new vice president and general manager: William E. Gilmore. Two weeks later, the Kinetoscope's epochal moment arrived.

=== Kinetoscope parlor ===
On April 14, 1894, a public Kinetoscope parlor was opened by the Holland Bros. in New York City at 1155 Broadway, on the corner of 27th Street—the first commercial motion picture house. The venue had ten machines, set up in parallel rows of five, each showing a different movie. For 25 cents a viewer could see all the films in either row; half a dollar gave access to the entire bill. The four-foot-tall machines were purchased from the new Kinetoscope Company, which had contracted with Edison for their production; the firm, headed by Norman C. Raff and Frank R. Gammon, included among its investors Andrew M. Holland, one of the entrepreneurial siblings, and Edison's former business chief, Alfred O. Tate.

The ten films that comprise the first commercial movie program, all shot at the Black Maria and each running about 15 to 20 seconds, were descriptively titled according to Gordon Hendricks: Sandow, Horse Shoeing, Barber Shop, Bertoldi (Mouth Support), Wrestling, Bertoldi (Table Contortion), Blacksmiths, Highland Dance, Trapeze and Roosters. As historian Charles Musser describes, a "profound transformation of American life and performance culture" had begun.

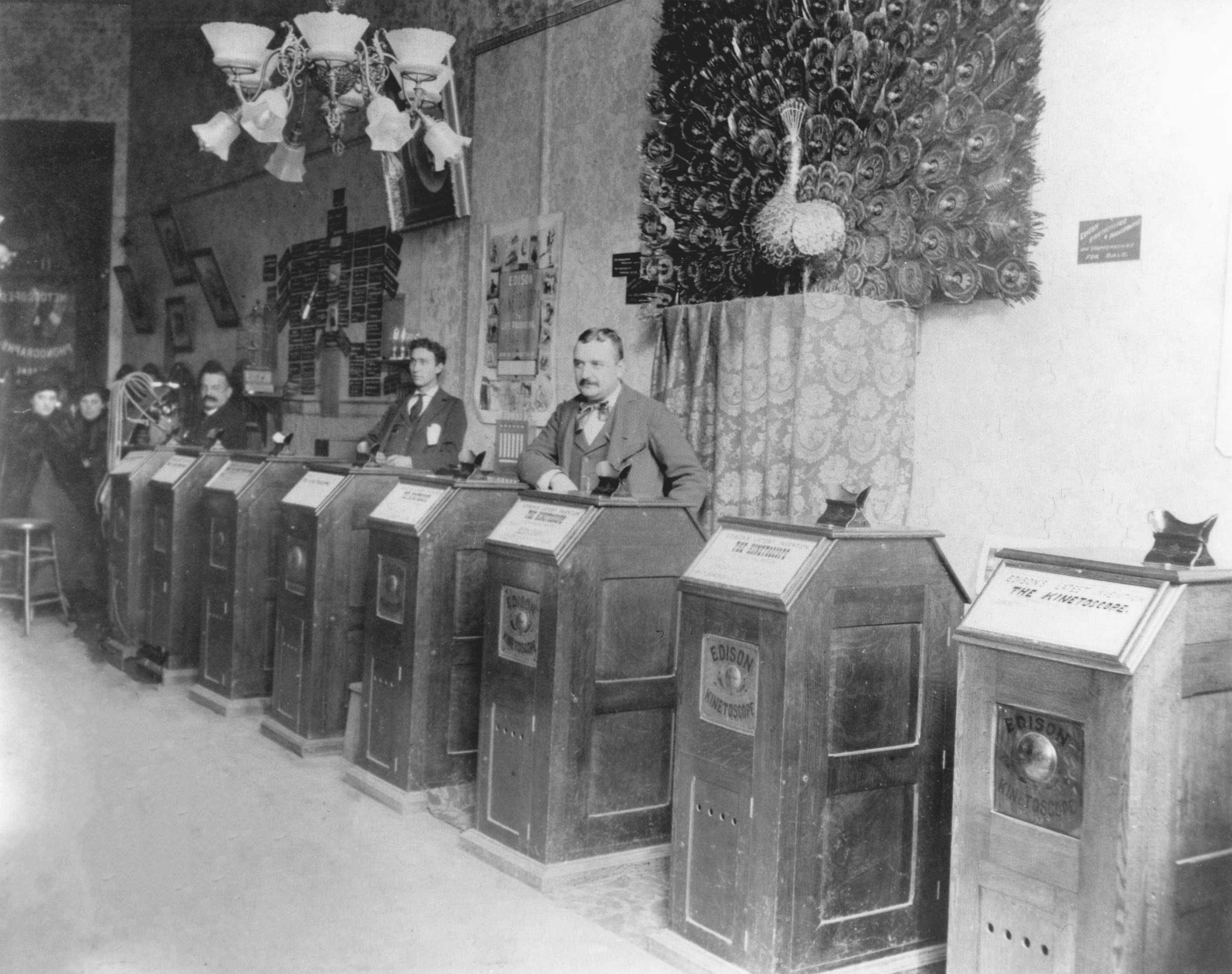
A San Francisco Kinetoscope parlor, c. 1894–95.

Twenty-five cents for no more than a few minutes of entertainment was hardly cheap diversion. For the same amount, one could purchase a ticket to a major vaudeville theater; when America's first amusement park opened in Coney Island the following year, a 25-cent entrance fee covered admission to three rides, a performing sea lion show, and a dance hall. The Kinetoscope was an immediate success, however, and by June 1, the Hollands were also operating venues in Chicago and San Francisco. Entrepreneurs (including Raff and Gammon, with their own International Novelty Co.) were soon running Kinetoscope parlors and temporary exhibition venues around the United States. New firms joined the Kinetoscope Company in commissioning and marketing the machines. The Kinetoscope exhibition spaces were largely, though not uniformly, profitable. After fifty weeks in operation, the Hollands' New York parlor had generated approximately $1,400 in monthly receipts against an estimated $515 in monthly operating costs; receipts from the Chicago venue (located in a Masonic temple) were substantially lower, about $700 a month, though presumably operating costs were lower as well. For each machine, Edison's business at first generally charged $250 to the Kinetoscope Company and other distributors, which would use them in their own exhibition parlors or resell them to independent exhibitors; individual films were initially priced by Edison at $10. During the Kinetoscope's first eleven months of commercialization, the sale of viewing machines, films, and auxiliary items generated a profit of more than $85,000 for Edison's company.

One of the new firms to enter the field was the Kinetoscope Exhibition Company (no relation to Raff and Gammon's Kinetoscope Company); the firm's partners, brothers Otway and Grey Latham, Otway's friend Enoch Rector, and their employer, Samuel J. Tilden Jr., sought to combine the popularity of the Kinetoscope with that of prizefighting. This led to a series of significant developments in the motion picture field: The Kinetograph was then capable of shooting only a 50-foot-long negative. At 16 frames per foot, this meant a maximum running time of 20 seconds at 40 frames per second (fps), the speed most frequently employed with the camera. At the rate of 30 fps that had been used on occasion as far back as 1891, a film could run for almost 27 seconds. Hendricks identifies Sandow as having been shot at 16 fps, as does the Library of Congress in its online catalog, where its duration is listed as 40 seconds. Even at the slowest of these rates, the running time would not have been enough to accommodate a satisfactory exchange of fisticuffs; 16 fps, as well, might have been thought to give too herky-jerky a visual effect for enjoyment of the sport. The Kinetograph and Kinetoscope were modified, possibly with Rector's assistance, so they could manage filmstrips three times longer than had previously been used.

The June 1894 Leonard–Cushing bout. Each of the six one-minute rounds recorded by the Kinetograph was made available to exhibitors for $45. Customers who watched the final round saw Leonard score a knockdown.

On June 15, a match with abbreviated rounds was staged between boxers Michael Leonard and Jack Cushing at the Black Maria. Seven-hundred-and-fifty feet worth of images or even more were shot at the rate of 30 fps—easily the longest motion picture to date. Several weeks later, the film premiered at the Kinetoscope Exhibition Company's parlor at 83 Nassau Street in New York. A half-dozen expanded Kinetoscope machines each showed a different round of the fight for a dime, meaning 60 cents to see the complete bout. For a planned series of follow-up fights (of which the outcome of at least the first was fixed), the Lathams signed famous heavyweight James J. Corbett, stipulating that his image could not be recorded by any other Kinetoscope company—the first movie star contract. In sum, seventy-five films were shot at the Edison facility in 1894.

Just three months after the commercial debut of the motion picture came the first recorded instance of motion picture censorship. The film in question showed a performance by the Spanish dancer Carmencita, a New York music hall star since the beginning of the decade. According to one description of her live act, she "communicated an intense sexuality across the footlights that led male reporters to write long, exuberant columns about her performance"—articles that would later be reproduced in the Edison film catalog. The Kinetoscope movie of her dance, shot at the Black Maria in mid-March 1894, was playing in the New Jersey resort town Asbury Park by summer. The town's founder, James A. Bradley, a real estate developer and leading member of the Methodist community, had recently been elected a state senator: "The Newark Evening News of 17 July 1894 reported that [Senator] Bradley...was so shocked by the glimpse of Carmencita's ankles and lace that he complained to Mayor Ten Broeck. The showman was thereupon ordered to withdraw the offending film, which he replaced with Boxing Cats." The following month, a San Francisco exhibitor was arrested for a Kinetoscope operation "alleged to be indecent." The group whose disgruntlement occasioned the arrest was the Pacific Society for the Suppression of Vice, whose targets included "illicit literature, obscene pictures and books, the sale of morphine, cocaine, opium, tobacco and liquors to minors, lottery tickets, etc.," and which proudly took credit for having "caused 70 arrests and obtained 48 convictions" in a recent two-month span.

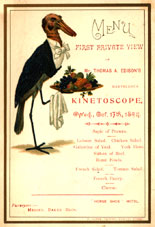
Advertisement announcing the initial Kinetoscope exhibition in London, held on October 17, 1894.

The Kinetoscope was also gaining notice abroad. On July 16, 1894, it was demonstrated publicly for the first time in Europe at the 20 boulevard Montmartre newsroom of Le petit Parisienne, where photographer Antoine Lumière may have seen it for the first time. In September, the first Kinetoscope parlor outside the United States opened in Buenos Aires, Argentina. The first European Kinetoscope parlor was soon operating in Paris, at 20 boulevard Poissonnière. One of the owners was a business associate of Antoine Lumière's, whom he gave a strip from Barber Shop and a request for cheaper alternatives to the expensive Edison-produced films he was showing. Along with the stir created by the Kinetoscope itself, this was one of the primary inspirations for the Lumière brothers, Antoine's sons, who would go on to develop not only improved motion picture cameras and film stock but also the first commercially successful movie projection system. In mid-October, a Kinetoscope parlor opened in London. At the end of November, by which point New York City was host to half a dozen Kinetophone parlors and London to nearly as many, a venue with five machines opened in Sydney, Australia. By January 3, 25,000 filmgoers had paid the one-shilling fee (roughly equivalent to 25 cents, the same price for five film viewings as in the New York debut).

Dissemination of the system proceeded rapidly in Europe, as Edison had left his patents unprotected overseas. The most likely reason was the technology's reliance on a variety of foreign innovations and a consequent belief that patent applications would have little chance of success. An alternative view, however, used to be popular: The 1971 edition of the Encyclopædia Britannica, for instance, claims that Edison "apparently thought so little of his invention that he failed to pay the $150 that would have granted him an international copyright [sic]." As recently as 2004, Andrew Rausch stated that Edison "balked at a $150 fee for overseas patents" and "saw little commercial value in the Kinetoscope." Given that Edison, as much a businessman as an inventor, spent approximately $24,000 on the system's development and went so far as to build a facility expressly for moviemaking before his U.S. patent was awarded, Rausch's interpretation is not widely shared by present-day scholars. Whatever the cause, two Greek entrepreneurs, George Georgiades and George Tragides, took advantage of the opening. Already successfully operating a pair of London movie parlors with Edison Kinetoscopes, they commissioned English inventor and manufacturer Robert W. Paul to make copies of them. After fulfilling the Georgiades–Tragides contract, Paul decided to go into the movie business himself, proceeding to make dozens of additional Kinetoscope reproductions. In this pursuit, and to make films for both the original device and its knockoffs, Paul and photographer Birt Acres—briefly Paul's business partner—would originate a number of important innovations in both camera and exhibition technology. Meanwhile, plans were advancing at the Black Maria to realize Edison's goal of a motion picture system uniting image with sound.

== Kinetophone ==
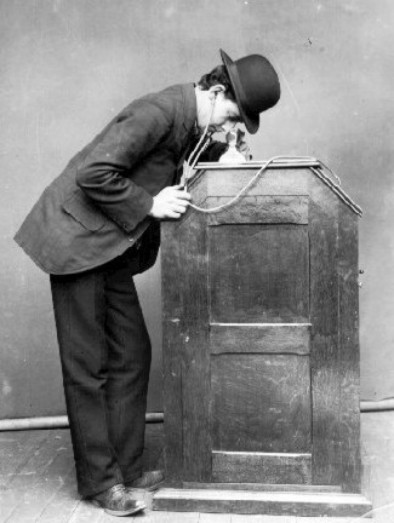
The 1895 version of the Kinetophone in use, showing the earphones that lead to the cylinder phonograph within the cabinet.

Kinetephone test film, c. 1894–95. In 1998, the soundless film and audio from a repaired wax cylinder were digitally combined by Walter Murch.

The Kinetophone (also known as Phonokinetoscope) was an early attempt by Edison and Dickson to create a sound-film system. The October 1893 Scientific American report on the Chicago World's Fair suggests that a Kinetograph camera accompanied by a cylinder phonograph was presented there as a demonstration of the potential to simultaneously record image and sound. The first known movie made as a test of the Kinetophone was shot at Edison's New Jersey studio in late 1894 or early 1895; now referred to as the Dickson Experimental Sound Film, it is the only surviving movie with live-recorded sound made for the Kinetophone. In March 1895, Edison offered the device for sale; involving no technological innovations, it was a Kinetoscope whose modified cabinet included an accompanying cylinder phonograph. Kinetoscope owners were also offered kits with which to retrofit their equipment. The first Kinetophone exhibitions appear to have taken place in April.

Though a Library of Congress educational website states, "The picture and sound were made somewhat synchronous by connecting the two with a belt", this is incorrect. As historian David Robinson describes, "The Kinetophone...made no attempt at synchronization. The viewer listened through tubes to a phonograph concealed in the cabinet and performing approximately appropriate music or other sound." Historian Douglas Gomery concurs, "[Edison] did not try to synchronize sound and image." Leading production sound mixer Mark Ulano writes that Kinetophones "did not play synchronously other than the phonograph turned on when viewing and off when stopped." While the surviving Dickson test involves live-recorded sound, certainly most, and probably all, of the films marketed for the Kinetophone were shot as silents, predominantly march or dance subjects; exhibitors could then choose from a variety of musical cylinders offering a rhythmic match. For example, three different cylinders with orchestral performances were proposed as accompaniments for Carmencita: "Valse Santiago", "La Paloma", and "Alma-Danza Spagnola".

Even as Edison followed his dream of securing the Kinetoscope's popularity by adding sound to its allure, many in the field were beginning to suspect that film projection was the next step that should be pursued. When Norman Raff communicated his customers' interest in such a system to Edison, he summarily rejected the notion:

No, if we make this screen machine that you are asking for, it will spoil everything. We are making these peep show machines and selling a lot of them at a good profit. If we put out a screen machine there will be a use for maybe about ten of them in the whole United States. With that many screen machines you could show the pictures to everybody in the country—and then it would be done. Let's not kill the goose that lays the golden egg.

Under continuing pressure from Raff, Edison eventually conceded to investigate the possibility of developing a projection system. He seconded one of his lab's technicians to the Kinetoscope Company to initiate the work, without informing Dickson. Tensions between the latter and Edison Company general manager William Gilmore had been running high for months; Dickson's eventual discovery of the Kinetoscope Company move appears to have been another central factor in his break with Edison that occurred in April 1895. The Kinetophone's debut excited little demand; a total of just forty-five of the machines were built over the next half-decade. With Dickson's departure, Edison ceased new work on sound cinema for an extended period.

== Projection wins out ==
On January 3, 1895, a British inventor received a patent for an unwieldy contraption meant to cast an enlarged Kinetoscope image onto a screen. Over the course of the year, even as new Kinetoscope exhibits opened as far afield as Mexico City, major cities across Europe, locales large and small around Australia, and Auckland, New Zealand, it became evident that the system was going to lose out to projected motion pictures. In its second year of commercialization, the Kinetoscope operation's profits plummeted by more than 95 percent, to just over $4,000. The Latham brothers and their father, Woodville, had been developing a film projection system, retaining the services of former Edison employee Eugene Lauste and benefiting secretly from Dickson's assistance while he was still in Edison's employ. A few weeks after he and Edison fell out, Dickson openly participated in an April 21 screening of the Latham group's new Eidoloscope for at least one member of the New York press, which historians describe as the first public film projection in the U.S. On May 20, in Lower Manhattan, the world's first run of commercial motion picture screenings began: the Eidoloscope show's prime attraction was a boxing match between Young Griffo and Charles Barnett, approximately eight minutes long. European inventors, most prominently the Lumières and Germany's Skladanowsky brothers, were moving forward with similar systems. Another challenge came from a new "peep show" device, the cheap, flip-book-based Mutoscope—another venture to which Dickson had secretly contributed while working for Edison and to which he devoted himself following the Eidoloscope debut. Before year's end, the Mutoscope team, using their Mutograph camera as a basis, developed a projector. At that point, North American orders for new Kinetoscopes had all but evaporated.

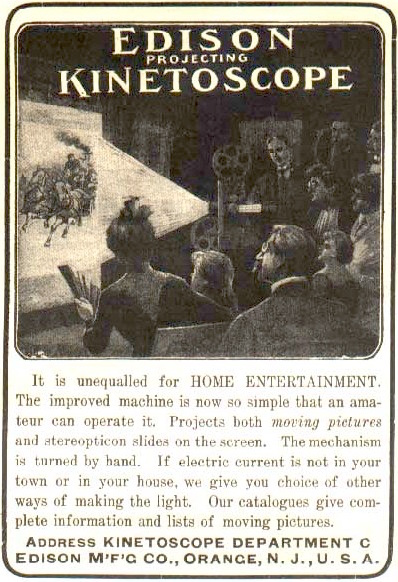
In the first decade of the 1900s, years before the compact Home Projecting Kinetoscope, Edison marketed an essentially theatrical 35 mm version for domestic use.

By the beginning of 1896, Edison was turning his focus to the promotion of a projector technology, the Phantoscope, developed by young inventors Charles Francis Jenkins and Thomas Armat. The rights to the system had been acquired by Raff and Gammon, who redubbed it the Vitascope and arranged with Edison to present himself as its creator. The Vitascope premiered in New York in April and met with swift success, but was just as quickly surpassed by the Cinématographe of the Lumières, which arrived in June with the backing of Benjamin F. Keith and his circuit of vaudeville theaters. The Eidoloscope's prospects, meanwhile, were crippled by projection deficiencies and business disputes. In September 1896, the Mutoscope Company's projector, the Biograph, was released; better funded than its competitors and with superior image quality, by the end of the year it was allied with Keith and soon dominated the North American projection market.

Departing the Vitascope operation after little more than a year—in which the Edison Company's film-related business made a $25,000 profit—Edison commissioned the development of his own projection systems, the Projectoscope and then multiple iterations of the Projecting Kinetoscope, eventually targeting semiprofessional and amateur customers. At its peak, around 1907–8, the Projecting Kinetoscope commanded 30 percent of US projector sales. In 1912, Edison introduced the ambitious Home Projecting Kinetoscope, which employed a unique format of three parallel columns of sequential frames on one strip of film—the middle column ran through the machine in the reverse direction from its neighbors. It was a commercial failure. Three years later, the Edison operation came out with its last substantial new film exhibition technology, a short-lived theatrical system called the Super Kinetoscope. Aside from the actual Edison Studios film productions, the company's most creative work in the motion picture field from 1897 on involved the use of Kinetoscope-related patents in threatened or actual lawsuits for the purpose of financially pressuring or blocking commercial rivals.

As far back as some of the early Eidoloscope screenings, exhibitors had occasionally shown films accompanied by phonographs playing appropriate, though very roughly timed, sound effects; in the style of the Kinetophone described above, rhythmically matching recordings were also made available for march and dance subjects. While Edison oversaw cursory sound-cinema experiments after the success of The Great Train Robbery (1903) and other Edison Manufacturing Company productions, it was not until 1908 that he returned in earnest to the combined audiovisual concept that had first led him to enter the motion picture field. Edison patented a synchronization system connecting a projector and a phonograph, located behind the screen, via an assembly of three rigid shafts—a vertical one descending from each device, joined by a third running horizontally the entire length of the theater, beneath the floor. Two years later, he supervised a press demonstration at the laboratory of a sound-film system of either this or a later design.

In 1913, Edison finally introduced the new Kinetophone—like all of his sound-film exhibition systems since the first in the mid-1890s, it used a cylinder phonograph, now connected to a Projecting Kinetoscope via a fishing line–type belt and a series of metal pulleys. It met with early acclaim, but poorly trained operators had trouble keeping picture in synchronization with sound and, like other sound-film systems of the era, the Kinetophone had not solved the issues of insufficient amplification and unpleasant audio quality. Its drawing power as a novelty soon faded and when a fire at Edison's West Orange complex in December 1914 destroyed all of the company's Kinetophone image and sound masters, the system was abandoned.

== Gallery ==
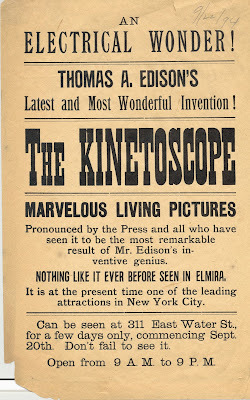
Advertisement for Kinetoscope exhibition in Elmira, New York, September 1894

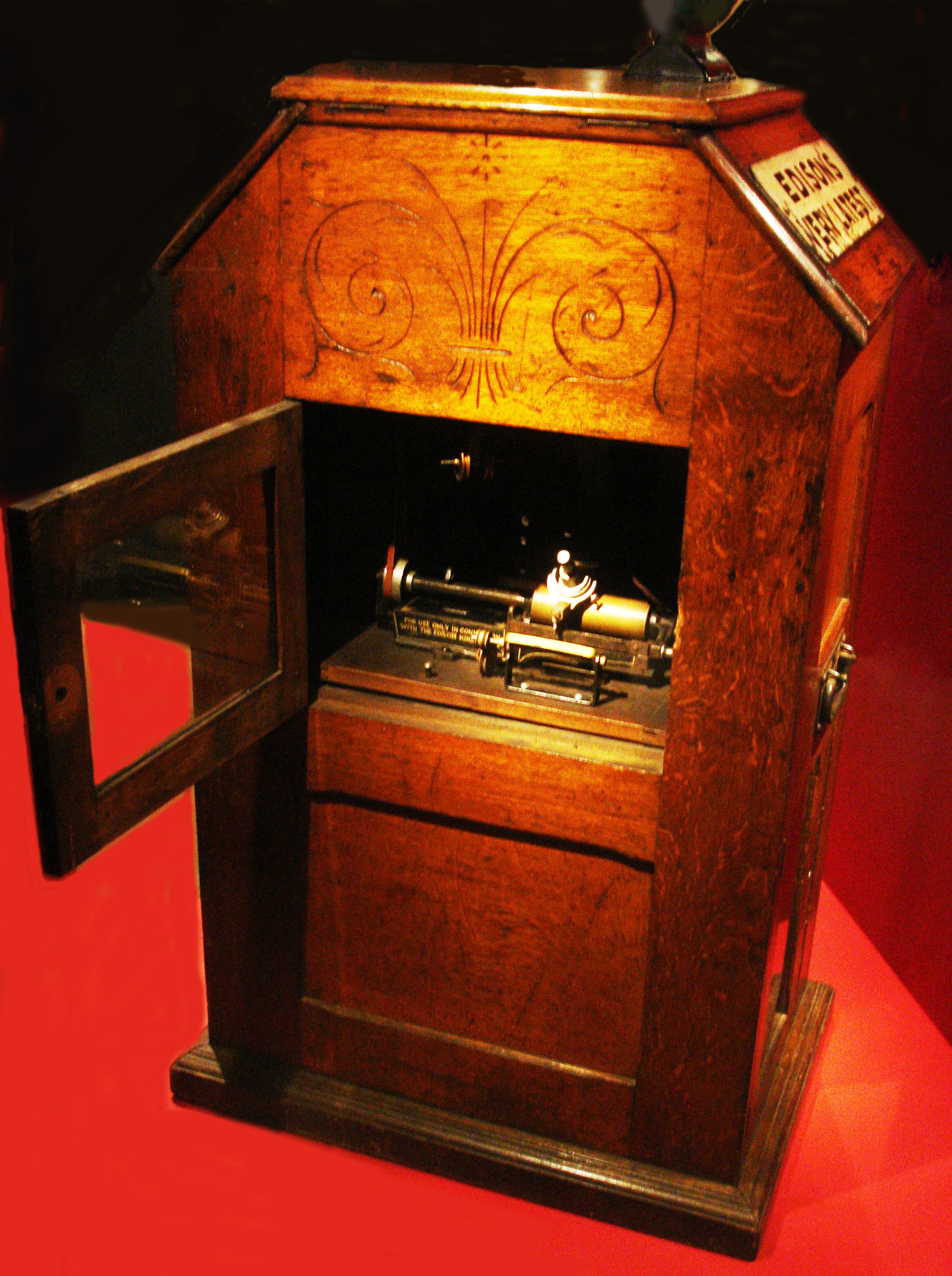
Rear view of a cabinet Kinetophone, showing its belt-driven wax cylinder phonograph

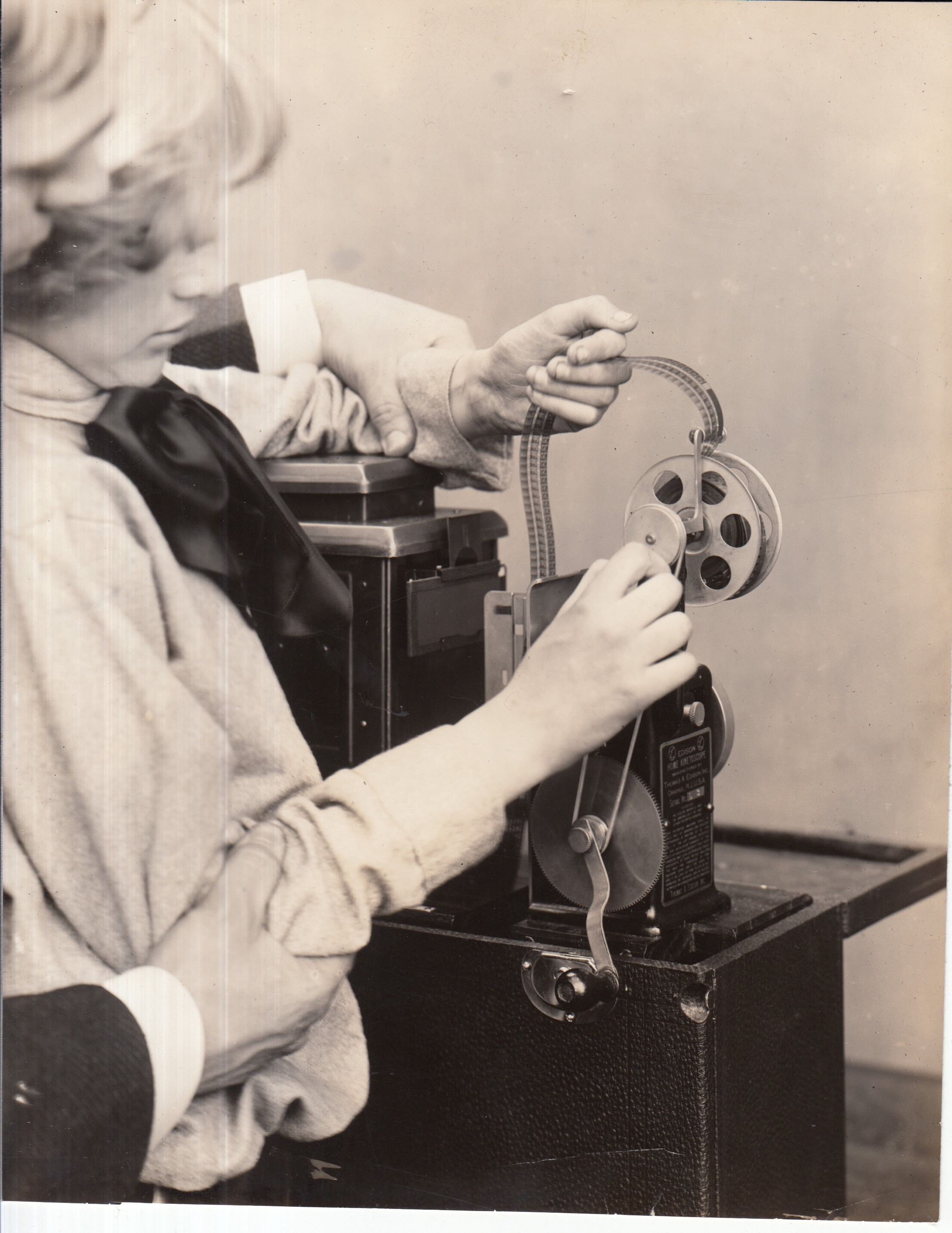
Triple-column film being threaded through the Home Projecting Kinetoscope, 1912

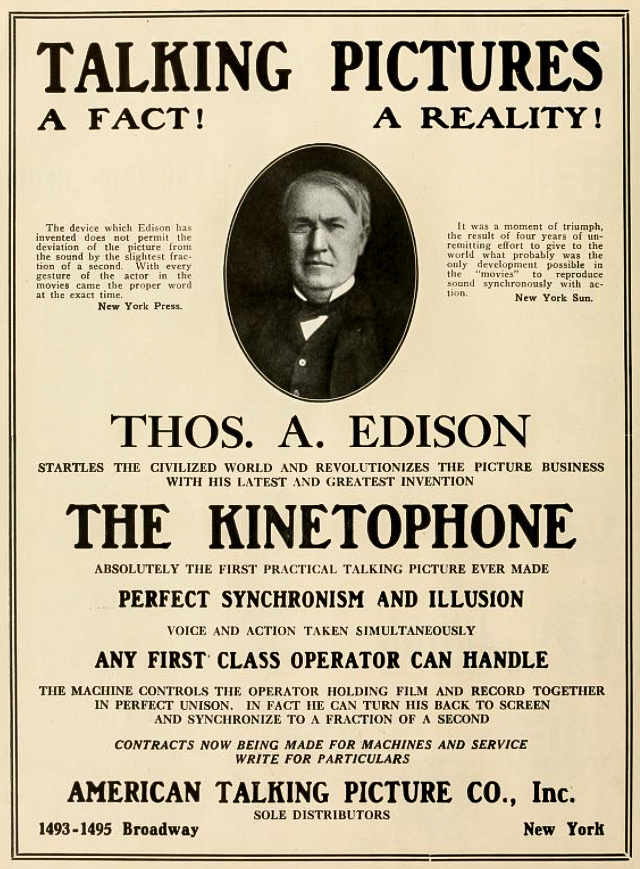
Promotion of projecting Kinetophone system, January 1913

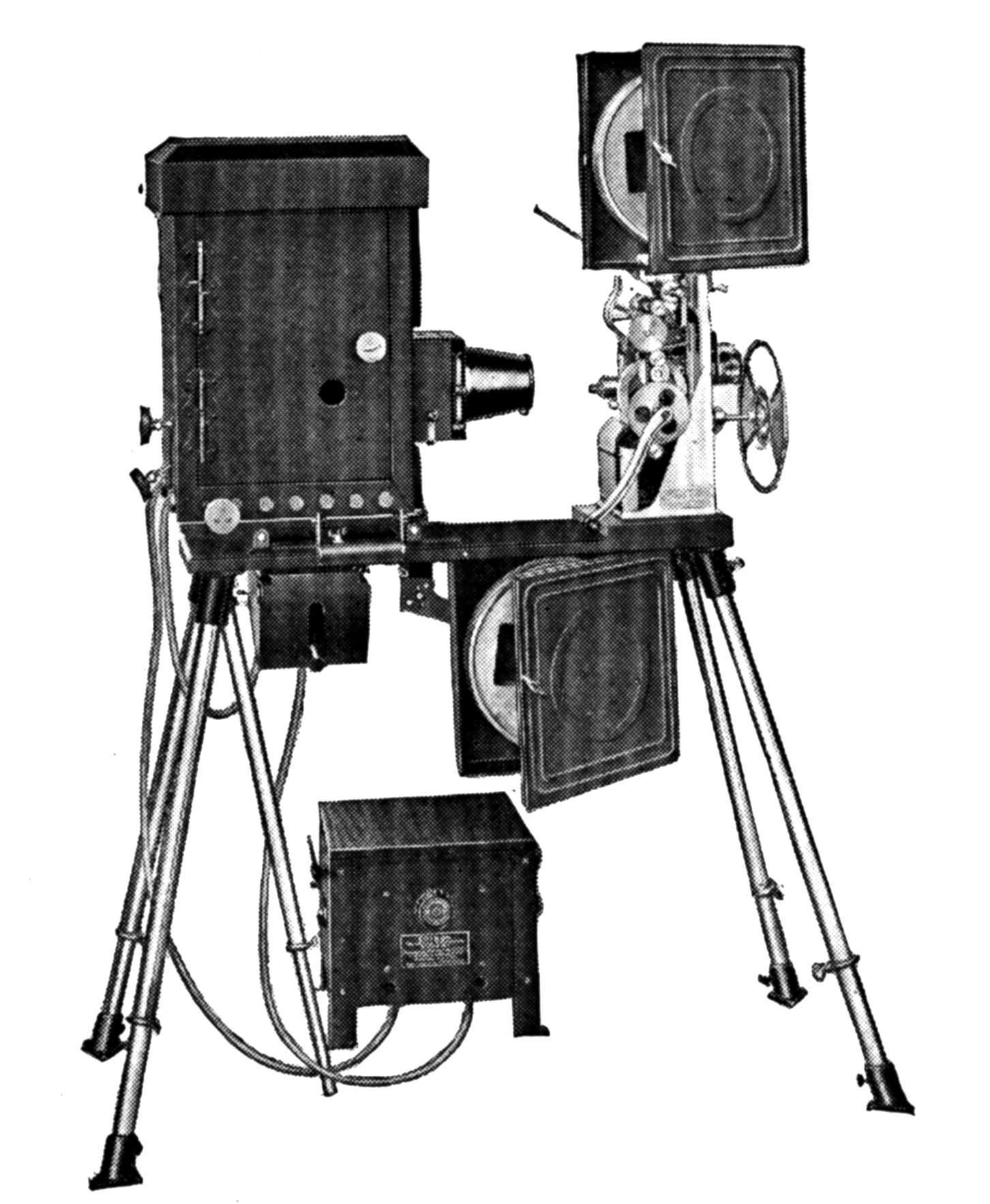
Projecting Kinetoscope, 1914

== See also ==
- William Friese-Greene
- List of film formats
- Motion Picture Patents Company

== Sources ==
- Altman, Rick (2004). Silent Film Sound. New York: Columbia University Press. ISBN 0-231-11662-4
- Appelbaum, Stanley (1980). The Chicago World's Fair of 1893: A Photographic Record. New York: Dover. ISBN 0-486-23990-X
- Baldwin, Neil (2001 [1995]). Edison: Inventing the Century. Chicago: University of Chicago Press. ISBN 0-226-03571-9
- Braun, Marta (1992). Picturing Time: The Work of Etienne-Jules Marey (1830–1904). Chicago: University of Chicago Press. ISBN 0-226-07173-1
- Burns, Richard W. (1998). Television: An International History of the Formative Years. London: Institution of Electrical Engineers. ISBN 0-85296-914-7
- Christie, Ian (2019). Robert Paul and the Origins of British Cinema. Chicago and London: University of Chicago Press. ISBN 978-0-226-10562-8
- Cross, Gary S., and John K. Walton (2005). The Playful Crowd: Pleasure Places in the Twentieth Century. New York: Columbia University Press. ISBN 0-231-12724-3
- Dickson, W.K.L. (1907). "Edison's Kinematograph Experiments," in A History of Early Film, vol. 1 (2000), ed. Stephen Herbert. London and New York: Routledge. ISBN 0-415-21152-2
- Edison, Thomas A. (1891a). "Kinetographic Camera" in Mannoni et al., Light and Movement, n.p.
- Edison, Thomas A. (1891b). "Apparatus for Exhibiting Photographs of Moving Objects" in Mannoni et al., Light and Movement, n.p.
- Gomery, Douglas (1985). "The Coming of Sound: Technological Change in the American Film Industry," in Technology and Culture—The Film Reader (2005), ed. Andrew Utterson, pp. 53–67. Oxford and New York: Routledge/Taylor & Francis. ISBN 0-415-31984-6
- Gomery, Douglas (2005). The Coming of Sound: A History. New York and Oxon, UK: Routledge. ISBN 0-415-96900-X
- Gosser, H. Mark (1977). Selected Attempts at Stereoscopic Moving Pictures and Their Relationship to the Development of Motion Picture Technology, 1852–1903. New York: Arno Press. ISBN 0-405-09890-1
- Grieveson, Lee, and Peter Krämer, eds. (2004). The Silent Cinema Reader. London and New York: Routledge. ISBN 0-415-25283-0
- Griffith, Richard, and Stanley William Reed (1971). "Motion Pictures," in Encyclopædia Britannica, 15th ed, vol. 15, pp. 898–918. Chicago et al.: Encyclopædia Britannica. ISBN 0-85229-151-5
- Guida practica per l'uso...del kinetoscopio Edison (n.a.; 1895–96). Milan: Edita dall' "Elettricità." Selected pages in Mannoni et al., Light and Movement, n.p.
- Gunning, Tom (1994 [1991]). D. W. Griffith and the Origins of American Narrative Film: The Early Years at Biograph. Urbana and Chicago: University of Illinois Press. ISBN 0-252-06366-X
- Hendricks, Gordon (1961). The Edison Motion Picture Myth. Berkeley and Los Angeles: University of California Press. Reprinted in Hendricks, Gordon (1972). Origins of the American Film. New York: Arno Press/New York Times (available at the Internet Archive). ISBN 0-405-03919-0
- Hendricks, Gordon (1966). The Kinetoscope: America's First Commercially Successful Motion Picture Exhibitor. New York: Theodore Gaus' Sons. Reprinted in Hendricks, Origins of the American Film (available at the Internet Archive).
- Jenness, Charles Kelley (1894). The Charities of San Francisco: A Directory of the Benevolent and Correctional Agencies. San Francisco: Book Room Print/Stanford University (available at the Internet Archive).
- Karcher, Alan J. (1998). New Jersey's Multiple Municipal Madness. New Brunswick, NJ, and London: Rutgers University Press. ISBN 0-8135-2565-9
- Lipton, Lenny (2021). The Cinema in Flux: The Evolution of Motion Picture Technology from the Magic Lantern to the Digital Era. New York: Springer. ISBN 978-1-0716-0950-7
- Mannoni, Laurent, Donata Pesenti Campagnoni, and David Robinson (1996). Light and Movement: Incunabula of the Motion Picture, 1420–1896/Luce e movimento: Incunaboli dell'immagine animata, 1420–1896. London: BFI Publishing/Le Giornate Del CInema Muto, Cinémathèque française–Musée du Cinéma, Museo Nazionale del Cinema. ISBN 88-86155-05-0
- Millard, Andre (1990). Edison and the Business of Innovation. Baltimore: Johns Hopkins University Press. ISBN 0-8018-3306-X
- Münsterberg, Hugo (2004 [1916]). The Film: A Psychological Study. Mineola, NY: Dover. ISBN 0-486-43386-2
- Musser, Charles (1991). Before the Nickelodeon: Edwin S. Porter and the Edison Manufacturing Company. Berkeley, Los Angeles, and Oxford: University of California Press. ISBN 0-520-06986-2
- Musser, Charles (1994 [1990]). The Emergence of Cinema: The American Screen to 1907. Berkeley, Los Angeles, and London: University of California Press. ISBN 0-520-08533-7
- Musser, Charles (2002). "Introducing Cinema to the American Public: The Vitascope in the United States, 1896–7," in Moviegoing in America: A Sourcebook in the History of Film Exhibition, ed. Gregory Waller, pp. 13–26. Malden, MA, and Oxford: Blackwell (available online). ISBN 0-631-22591-9
- Musser, Charles (2004). "At the Beginning: Motion Picture Production, Representation and Ideology at the Edison and Lumière Companies," in Grieveson and Krämer, Silent Cinema Reader, pp. 15–28.
- Neupert, Richard (2022). French Film History, 1895–1946. Madison: University of Wisconsin Press. ISBN 978-0299337704
- Ramsaye, Terry (1986 [1926]). A Million and One Nights: A History of the Motion Picture Through 1925. New York: Touchstone (available at the Internet Archive). ISBN 0-671-62404-0
- Rausch, Andrew J. (2004). Turning Points in Film History. New York: Citadel Press. ISBN 0-8065-2592-4
- Robertson, Patrick (2001). Film Facts. New York: Billboard Books. ISBN 0-8230-7943-0
- Robinson, David (1996). "[Carmencita description]," in Mannoni et al., Light and Movement, n.p.
- Robinson, David (1997). From Peep Show to Palace: The Birth of American Film. New York and Chichester, West Sussex: Columbia University Press. ISBN 0-231-10338-7
- Rossell, Deac (1998). Living Pictures: The Origins of the Movies. Albany: State University of New York Press. ISBN 0-7914-3767-1
- Rossell, Deac (2022). Chronology of the Birth of Cinema 1833–1896. New Barnet, UK, and Bloomington: John Libbey Publishing/Indiana University Press. ISBN 978-0-86196-716-2
- Salt, Barry (1992). Film Style and Technology: History and Analysis. London: Starword. ISBN 0-9509066-0-3
- Schwartz, Vanessa R. (1999 [1998]). Spectacular Realities: Early Mass Culture in Fin-de-siècle Paris. Berkeley, Los Angeles, and London: University of California Press. ISBN 0-520-22168-0
- Spehr, Paul C. (2000). "Unaltered to Date: Developing 35 mm Film," in Moving Images: From Edison to the Webcam, ed. John Fullerton and Astrid Söderbergh Widding, pp. 3–28. Sydney: John Libbey & Co. ISBN 1-86462-054-4
- Spehr, Paul C. (2008). The Man Who Made Movies: W.K.L. Dickson. New Barnet and Bloomington: John Libbey Publishing/Indiana University Press. ISBN 978-0-86196-695-0
- Stross, Randall E. (2007). The Wizard of Menlo Park: How Thomas Alva Edison Invented the Modern World. New York: Crown. ISBN 1-4000-4763-3
- Van Dulken, Stephen (2004). American Inventions: A History of Curious, Extraordinary, and Just Plain Useful Patents. New York: New York University Press. ISBN 0-8147-8813-0
- Zielinski, Siegfried (1999 [1989]). Audiovisions: Cinema and Television as Entr'actes in History, trans. Gloria Custance. Amsterdam: Amsterdam University Press. ISBN 90-5356-303-2
