= Edison's Black Maria =

Film production studio

Coordinates: 40.7843°N 74.2337°W

The Black Maria (/məˈraɪ.ə/ mə-RY-ə) was Thomas Edison's film production studio in West Orange, New Jersey. It was the world's first film studio.

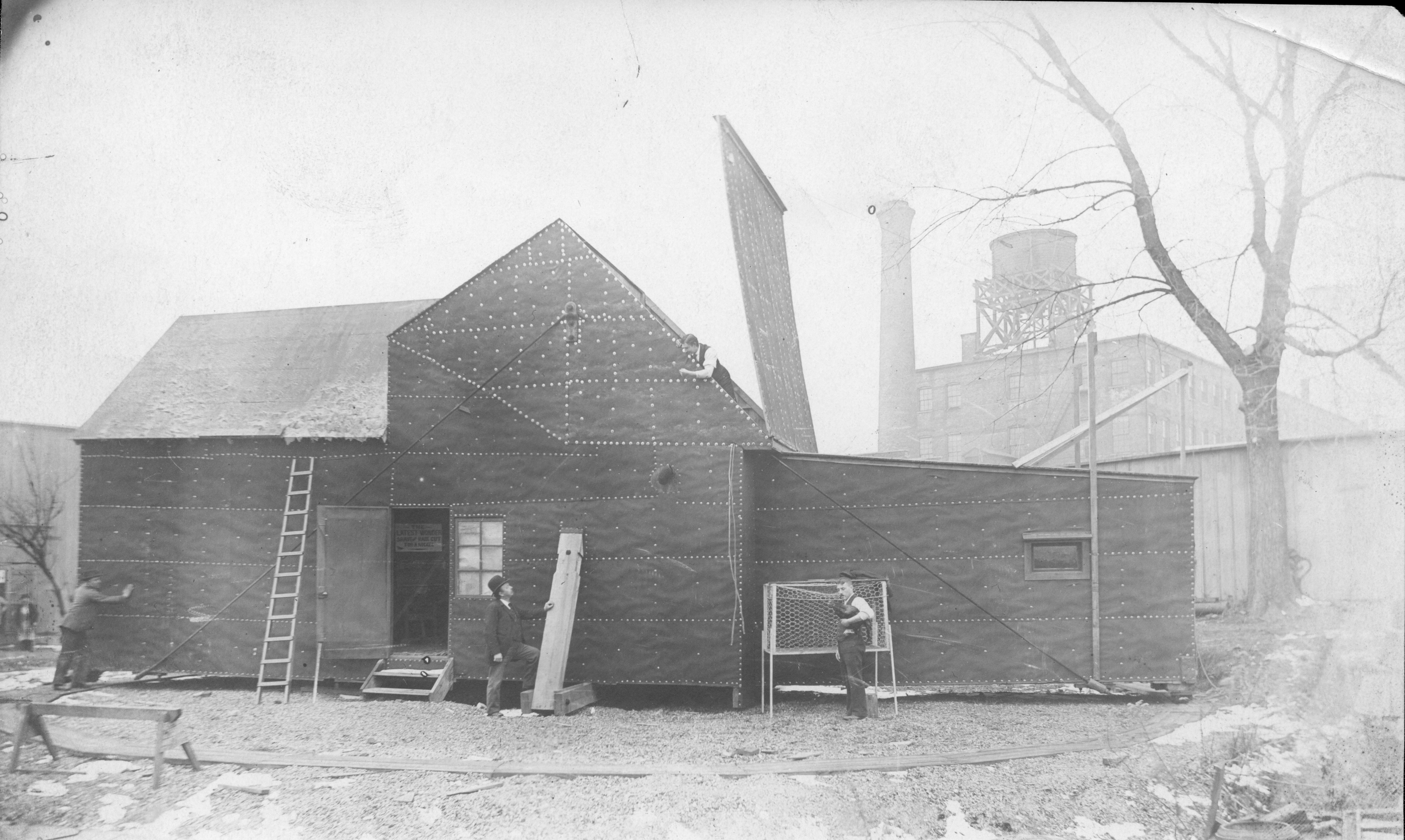
Edison's Black Maria Studio in the 1890s

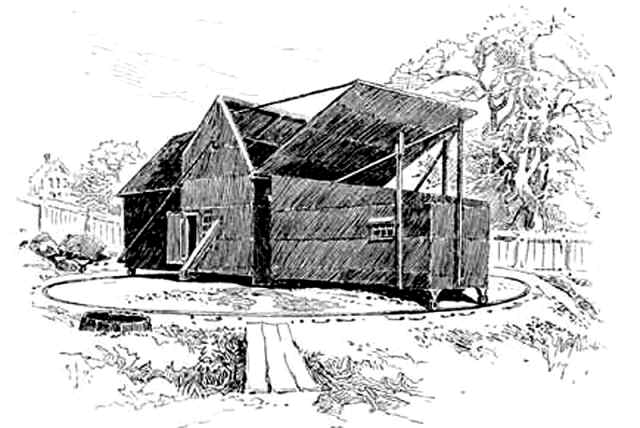
A drawing of the exterior from 1894

== History ==
In 1893, the world's first film production studio, the Black Maria, or the cinematographic Theater, was completed on the grounds of Edison's laboratories (now Thomas Edison National Historical Park), at West Orange, New Jersey, for the purpose of making film strips for the Kinetoscope. Construction of the building, which included a tar-paper-covered dark studio room with a retractable roof, began in December 1892 and was completed the following year at a cost of $637.67 ($22,850 in 2025 dollars). In early May 1893 at the Brooklyn Institute of Arts and Sciences, Edison conducted the world's first public demonstration of films shot using the Kinetograph in the Black Maria, with a Kinetoscope viewer. The exhibited film showed three male actors demonstrating the blacksmithing trade.

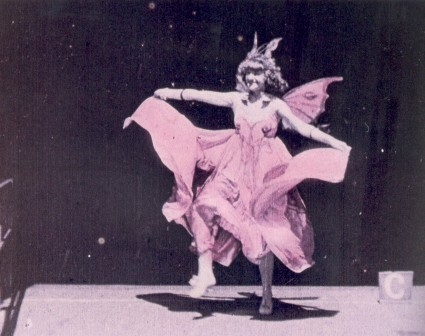
Annabelle Whitford doing her "butterfly dance", recorded at the Edison's Black Maria studio

The first motion pictures made in the Black Maria were deposited for copyright by W. K. Dickson at the Library of Congress in August 1893. In early January 1894, The Edison Kinetoscopic Record of a Sneeze (aka Fred Ott's Sneeze) was one of the first series of short films made by Dickson for the Kinetoscope in Edison's Black Maria studio with fellow assistant Fred Ott. The short film was made for publicity purposes, as a series of still photographs to accompany an article in Harper's Weekly. It was the earliest motion picture to be registered for copyright – composed of an optical record of Ott sneezing comically for the camera.

The first films shot at the Black Maria included segments of magic shows, plays, vaudeville performances (with dancers and strongmen), acts from Buffalo Bill's Wild West Show, various boxing matches and cockfights, and scantily-clad women. Many of the early Edison moving images released after 1895, however, were non-fictional "actualities" filmed on location: views of ordinary slices of life – street scenes, the activities of police or firemen, or shots of a passing train.

On Saturday, April 14, 1894, Edison's Kinetoscope began commercial operation. The Holland Brothers (Andrew M. Holland and George C. Holland) opened the first Kinetoscope Parlor at 1155 Broadway in New York City and for the first time, they commercially exhibited movies, as we know them today, in their amusement arcade. Patrons paid 25 cents ($9 in 2025 dollars) as the admission charge to view films in five kinetoscope machines placed in two rows. Nearly 500 people became cinema's first major audience during the showings of films with titles such as Barber Shop, Blacksmiths, Cock Fight, Wrestling, and Trapeze. Edison's film studio was used to supply films for this sensational new form of entertainment. More Kinetoscope parlors soon opened in other cities (San Francisco, Atlantic City, and Chicago). In 1901, the first public film was screened in Oberlin, Ohio, starting the transition from kinetoscope to screen.

When Edison built a glass-enclosed rooftop movie studio in New York City, the Black Maria was closed in January 1901, and Edison demolished the building in 1903. The U. S. National Park Service maintains a reproduction of the Black Maria, built in 1954 at what is now the Edison National Historic Site in West Orange. A previous reconstruction had been built and dedicated in May 1940 when MGM held the world premiere of Edison, the Man starring Spencer Tracy in theaters throughout The Oranges (West Orange, East Orange, South Orange, and Orange).

The Black Maria was, according to the staff who worked there, a small and uncomfortable place to work. Edison employees W. K. Dickson and Jonathan Campbell coined the name – it reminded them of police Black Marias, (police vans, also known as "paddywagons") of the time because they were also cramped, stuffy and a similar black color. Edison himself called it "The Doghouse", but that name never took hold.

The Black Maria was covered in black tarpaper and had a huge window in the ceiling that opened up to let in sunlight because early films required a tremendous amount of bright light. It was built on a turntable so the window could rotate toward the sun throughout the day, supplying natural light for hundreds of Edison movie productions over its eight-year lifespan.

When word spread about the new invention, performers flocked to the Black Maria from all over the country in order to be in the films. These silent movies featured dancers, pugilists, magicians and vaudeville performers. Their appearances at the studio were used as publicity opportunities by Edison, who would often pose with the performers for newspaper articles.

== Reconstruction ==
The Black Maria fell into disuse when film productions moved to New York, and the Edison company dismantled the studio in 1903. The Thomas Alva Edison Foundation built a replica Black Maria on the original site in 1954. The rebuilt studio was used to exhibit films to the public until it closed in the 1980s. In 2022 the National Park Service embarked on a two-year rehabilitation of the structure, involving extensive repairs, a new exterior, and an accessible ramp. The Black Maria opened again to the public in April 2024 with new exhibits, interpretive panels, a replica film backdrop, and a supply of period clothing that allows visitors to make their own films and selfies.

Sioux Ghost Dance

The boxing cats (Prof. Welton's)

== Selected films shot at the Black Maria ==
- Blacksmith Scene (1893)
- Washing the Baby (1893)
- Edison Kinetoscopic Record of a Sneeze, also known as Fred Ott's Sneeze (1894)
- The Boxing Cats (Prof. Welton's) (1894)
- The Dickson Experimental Sound Film (1894/95)
- Fun in a Chinese Laundry (1896)
- Sioux Ghost Dance
- Buffalo Bill's Shooting Skill
- Cripple Creek Bar-Room Scene

== In popular culture ==
- The Black Maria Film and Video Festival, established in 1981, was named for Edison's creation; since 2021 the event has been known as the Thomas Edison Film Festival.
- Edison's Black Maria studio is used in Hans-Jürgen Syberberg's movie Hitler: A Film from Germany in which it appears as a décor for some scenes.

== Bibliography ==
- Robinson, David (1997). From Peepshow to Palace: The Birth of American Film. New York and Chichester, West Sussex: Columbia University Press. ISBN 0-231-10338-7
