= William Heise =

American film director

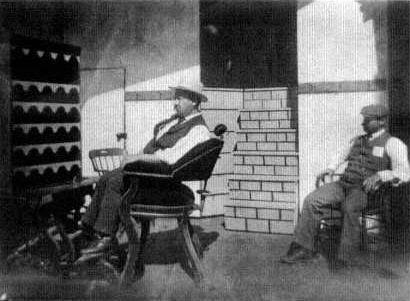
- William Heise (left) on the set of Edison's movie What Demoralized the Barber Shop in 1897
- Born: c. 1847 unknown
- Died: February 14, 1910 (aged 62–63) unknown

William Heise (c. 1847 – February 14, 1910) was a German-born American film cinematographer and director, active in the 1890s and credited for more than 175 short silent films. Heise filmed a "We All Smoke" skit promoting Admiral Cigarettes in 1897.

Heise is best known for "directing" The Kiss, an 1896 short film that depicted a kiss between May Irwin and John Rice. Direction, at this early stage in cinema, consisted mainly of pointing a stationary camera in one direction and capturing whatever action transpired within the frame. Along with W. K. L. Dickson, Heise was one of the most prolific filmmakers of the nascent days of cinema. He worked with Dickson on many of the early shorts, capturing numerous scenes of everyday life as well as different aspects of performance and sport. One example of the Heise-Dickson collaboration is The Dickson Experimental Sound Film. He served as cinematographer on 1894's Bucking Broncho and many others.
