= William Kennedy Dickson =

British-American inventor (1860–1935)

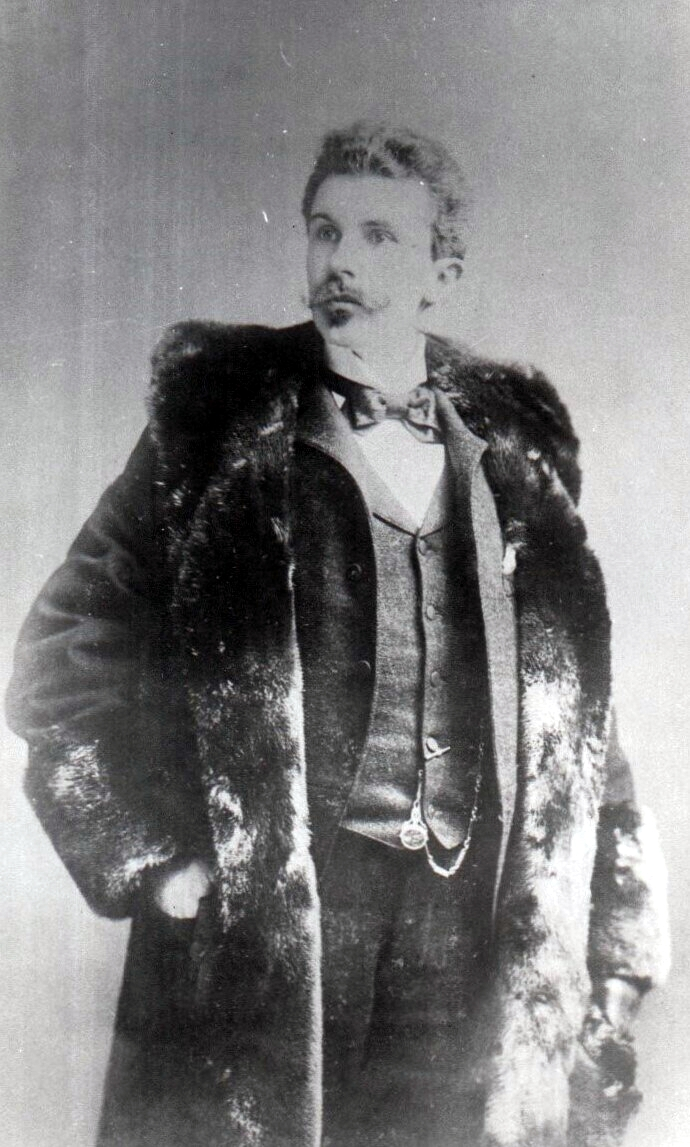
- Dickson, c. 1898
- Born: William Kennedy Laurie Dickson; 3 August 1860; Le Minihic-sur-Rance, Brittany, France
- Died: 28 September 1935 (aged 75); Twickenham, Middlesex, England
- Occupations: Inventor; director; producer; cinematographer; studio owner; actor

William Kennedy Laurie Dickson (3 August 1860 – 28 September 1935) was a British-American inventor who devised an early motion picture camera under the employment of Thomas Edison.

== Early life ==
William Kennedy Laurie Dickson was born on 3 August 1860 in Le Minihic-sur-Rance, Brittany, France. His mother, Elizabeth Kennedy-Laurie (1823–1879) was American, born in Virginia. His father was James Waite Dickson, a Scottish artist, astronomer and linguist. James Dickson claimed direct lineage from the painter William Hogarth, and from Judge John Waite, the man who sentenced King Charles I to death.

== Inventor and film innovator ==
At age 19 in 1879, William Dickson wrote a letter to American inventor and entrepreneur Thomas Edison seeking employment. He was turned down. That same year Dickson, his mother, and two sisters moved from Britain to Virginia. In 1883 he was finally hired to work at Edison's laboratory in Menlo Park, New Jersey. In 1888, Edison conceived of a device that would do "for the Eye what the phonograph does for the Ear". In October, Edison filed a preliminary claim, known as a caveat, with the United States Patent and Trademark Office; outlining his plans for the device, subsequently named the Kinetoscope. Dickson, then the Edison company's official photographer, was assigned to turn the concept into a reality.

Initial attempts were focused on recording micro-photographs on a cylinder. In late 1889, inspired by a recent encounter with Étienne-Jules Marey, Edison came up with a fourth caveat and ordered the team to change direction to work with rolls of film. William Dickson collaborated with the Eastman company to develop a practical celluloid film for this application. Initially using 19mm film, fed horizontally, shooting circular images, Dickson eventually settled on 35 mm film with a 1.33:1 picture ratio, a standard format which is still in use to this day in cinema.

Dickson Greeting, 1891

William Dickson and his team, at the Edison lab, simultaneously worked on the development of the Kinetoscope viewing machine. The first working prototype, using the 19mm film, was unveiled in May 1891 to a meeting of the National Federation of Women's Clubs, hosted by his wife. The 35mm camera was essentially finalised by the fall of 1892. The completed version of the 35mm Kinetoscope was unveiled at the Brooklyn Institute of Arts and Sciences on 9 May 1893. It was a peep show machine showing a continuous loop of film, lit by a small lamp, viewed individually through the window of a cabinet housing its components.

William Dickson and his team created the illusion of movement by continuously moving the strip of perforated film, bearing sequential images, whilst illuminating it by brief flashes of light through the slit in a rotating shutter. They also devised the Kinetograph, a motion picture camera to photograph films for in-house experiments and eventually, commercial Kinetoscope presentations, at speeds of up to 46 frames per second. To govern the intermittent movement of the film in the camera, allowing the strip to stop long enough so each frame could be fully exposed and then advancing it quickly (in about 1/460 of a second) to the next frame, the sprocket wheel that engaged the strip was driven by an escapement disc mechanism—the first practical system for the high-speed stop-and-go film movement that would be the foundation for the next century of cinematography.

In late 1894 or early 1895, William Dickson became an ad hoc advisor to the motion picture operation of the Latham brothers, Otway and Grey, who ran one of the leading Kinetoscope exhibition companies, and their father, Woodville Latham who had lectured in science. Seeking to develop a movie projector system, they hired former Edison employee Eugene Lauste, probably at Dickson's suggestion. In April 1895, Dickson left Edison's employ and provided some assistance to the Latham outfit. Alongside Lauste, he may have devised what would become known as the Latham loop, allowing the photography and exhibition of much longer filmstrips than had previously been possible. This idea had first been made public in 1890 in descriptions of the moving picture camera of William Friese-Greene. These former Edison associates helped to design the Eidoloscope projector system and a widescreen camera to film with, which would be used in the first commercial movie screening in world history on 20 May 1895. But Dickson soon parted company with them, to become part of the group that formed the American Mutoscope and Biograph Company, returning permanently to work in the United Kingdom in 1897 for the British side of the company. William Dickson was the first person to make a film of the Pope, and at the time his Biograph camera was blessed by Pope Leo XIII.

The Mutoscope machines produced moving images by means of a revolving drum of photographs/frames, similar in concept to flip-books, taken from an actual piece of film. They were often featured at seaside locations, showing (usually) sequences of women undressing or acting as an artist's model. In Britain, they became known as "What the butler saw" machines, taking the name from one of the first and most famous softcore reels.

== Death ==
The Grave of William Kennedy Laurie Dickson and His Wife

His association with Biograph ended inexplicably in 1911. Dickson spent his last years quietly in his house in Twickenham, England. He died on 28 September 1935, at the age of 75. He died without being given credit for his contributions to the history of modern filmography. This omission was corrected by the exhaustive research of Gordon Hendricks and Paul Spehr who revealed the full extent of his contributions to many moving picture projects. The grave was discovered by Denis Zanette in 2026, following research.

== Legacy ==
Dickson was the first to direct and likely star in a film with live recording. In 1894, he directed The Dickson Experimental Sound Film. A man (likely Dickson) played "The Song of the Cabin Boy" on the violin into a megaphone used for a partially off-camera phonograph. The film was the first to use the Kinetophone, the first device used in the earliest sound films.

== Publications ==
- The Biograph in Battle (T. Fisher Unwin, London 1901). (reprinted Flicks Books, UK, 1995).
- History of the Kinetograph, Kinetoscope, and Kinetophonograph (with Antonia Dickson, MOMA Publications 2000 ISBN 978-0870700385 Facsimile of Dickson's own copy of the book published in 1895)
- An Authentic Life of Edison. The Life and Inventions of Thomas Alva Edison. (with Antonia Dickson, 8 volumes. New-York. Thomas Y. Crowell & Co. 1894)
- Timeline, the history of editing (John Buck 2018). (incl Dickson inventions)(Tablo Books ISBN 978-1922192295).

== See also ==
- The Dickson Experimental Sound Film
- Blacksmith Scene
- Fred Ott's Sneeze
- Edison's Black Maria
- List of people on stamps of the United States
- Eugene Lauste
- William Kennedy Laurie Dickson filmography
