= 1890s in film =

List of years in film
- … 1880; 1881; 1882; 1883; 1884; 1885; 1886; 1887; 1888; 1889; 1890; 1891; 1892; 1893; 1894; 1895; 1896; 1897; 1898; 1899; 1900 …
- In television 1887 1888 1889 1890 1891 1892 1893
- Art; Archaeology; Architecture; Literature; Music; Philosophy; Science; +...

The decade of the 1890s in film involved some significant events.

== Events ==
Ten remaining frames of London's Trafalgar Square taken by Wordsworth Donisthorpe in 1890

- 1890 – Wordsworth Donisthorpe and W. C. Crofts film London's Trafalgar Square using a camera patented in 1889.
- 1891 – Following the work of Eadweard Muybridge, Étienne-Jules Marey, and George Eastman, Thomas Edison employee William K. L. Dickson finishes work on a motion-picture camera and a viewing machine called the Kinetoscope.
- May 20, 1891 – Thomas Edison holds the first public presentation of his Kinetoscope for the National Federation of Women's Clubs.
- August 24, 1891 – Edison files for a patent of the Kinetoscope.
- 1892 – In France, Charles-Émile Reynaud began to have public screenings in Paris at the Théâtre Optique, with hundreds of drawings on a reel that he wound through his Zoetrope projector to construct moving images that continued for 15 minutes.
- 1892 – The Eastman Company becomes the Eastman Kodak Company.
- March 14, 1893 – Edison is granted Patent #493,426 for "An Apparatus for Exhibiting Photographs of Moving Objects" (the Kinetoscope).
- 1893 – Edison builds a motion-picture studio near his laboratory, dubbed the Black Maria by his staff.
- May 9, 1893 – In America, Edison holds the first public exhibition of films shot using his Kinetograph at the Brooklyn Institute. Only one person at a time could use his Kinetoscope viewing machine.
- January 7, 1894 – Edison films his assistant, Fred Ott sneezing with the Kinetoscope at the "Black Maria".
- April 14, 1894 – The first commercial presentation of the Kinetoscope takes place in the Holland Brothers' Kinetoscope Parlor at 1155 Broadway, New York City.
- 1894 – Kinetoscope viewing parlors begin to open in major cities. Each parlor contains several machines.
- 1895 – In France, brothers named Auguste and Louis Lumière design and build a lightweight, hand-held motion picture camera called the Cinématographe. The brothers discover that their machine can also be used to project images onto a large screen. They create several short films at this time that are considered to be pivotal in the history of motion pictures.
- November 1895 – In Germany, Emil and Max Skladanowsky develop their own film projector.
- December 1895 – In France, the Lumière brothers hold their first public screening of films shot with their Cinématographe.
- January 1896 – In Britain, Birt Acres and Robert W. Paul develop their own film projector, the Theatrograph (later known as the Animatograph).
- January 1896 – In the United States, a projector called the Vitascope is designed by Charles Francis Jenkins and Thomas Armat. Armat begins to work with Edison to manufacture the Vitascope, which projects motion pictures.
- April 1896 – Edison and Armat's Vitascope is used to project motion pictures in public screenings in New York City.
- 1896 – French magician and filmmaker Georges Méliès begins experimenting with the new motion picture technology, developing many early special effects techniques, including stop-motion photography.
- 1896 – Pathé-Frères is founded.
- 1897 – A total of 125 people die during a film screening at the Charity Bazaar in Paris after a curtain catches on fire from the ether used to fuel the projector lamp.

== Births ==
- January 15, 1891 – Arne Weel (died 1975)
- January 22, 1893 – Conrad Veidt (died 1943)
- April 20, 1893 – Harold Lloyd (died 1971)
- October 4, 1895 – Buster Keaton (died 1966)
- January 3, 1897 – Marion Davies (died 1961)
- September 30, 1898 – Renée Adorée (died 1933)

== Lists of films ==
- 1890 in film
- 1891 in film
- 1892 in film
- 1893 in film
- 1894 in film
- 1895 in film
- 1896 in film
- 1897 in film
- 1898 in film
- 1899 in film

== See also ==
- Film
- History of film
- Lists of films
