= 1889 in film =

List of years in film
- … 1879; 1880; 1881; 1882; 1883; 1884; 1885; 1886; 1887; 1888; 1889; 1890; 1891; 1892; 1893; 1894; 1895; 1896; 1897; 1898; 1899 …
- In music 1886 1887 1888 1889 1890 1891 1892
- Art; Archaeology; Architecture; Literature; Music; Philosophy; Science; +...

The following is an overview of the events of 1889 in film, including a list of films released and notable births.

== Events ==
Monkeyshines No. 1 and 2.

- Eastman Kodak is the first company to begin commercial production of film on a flexible transparent base, celluloid.
- The first moving pictures developed on celluloid film are made in Hyde Park, London by William Friese Greene.
- Wordsworth Donisthorpe invents the Kinesigraph, which photographs a round image on 68 mm film.
- William K. L. Dickson completes his work for Thomas Edison on the Kinetograph cylinder either in this year or 1890. Monkeyshines No. 1 becomes the first film shot on the system.

== Films ==
- Leisurely Pedestrians, Open Topped Buses and Hansom Cabs with Trotting Horses (also known as Hyde Park Corner), a lost film and the first moving picture developed on celluloid film, directed by William Friese-Greene
- Monkeyshines No. 1 – contradictory sources indicate this was shot either in June 1889 or November 1890.

== Births ==
Month	Date	Name	Country	Profession	Died
January	23	Franklin Pangborn	US	Actor	1958
February	3	Carl Theodor Dreyer	Denmark	Director	1968
February	4	Walter Catlett	US	Actor, Comedian	1960
February	6	Herbert Hübner	Germany	Actor	1972
February	8	Siegfried Kracauer	Germany	Critic, Journalist	1966
February	22	Joseph Egger	Austria	Actor	1966
February	23	Musidora	France	Actress, screenwriter, director	1957
February	23	Victor Fleming	US	Director, cinematographer	1949
March	21	W. S. Van Dyke	US	Director	1943
March	28	Lola Braccini	Italy	Actress	1969
April	16	Charlie Chaplin	UK	Actor, filmmaker	1977
April	14	James Stephenson	UK	Actor	1941
April	26	Anita Loos	US	Writer, producer	1981
April	28	Bryant Washburn	US	Actor	1963
May	3	Beulah Bondi	US	Actress	1981
May	5	Harry Woods	US	Actor	1968
May	20	Karin Molander	Sweden	Actress	1978
May	31	Athene Seyler	UK	Actress	1990
June	11	Wesley Ruggles	US	Director, producer	1972
June	15	Marjorie Rambeau	US	Actress	1970
July	8	Eugene Pallette	US	Actor	1954
July	16	Larry Semon	US	Actor, screenwriter, director, producer	1978
July	27	Vera Karalli	Russia	Actress, Ballerina	1972
August	8	Hans Egede Budtz	Denmark	Actor	1968
August	24	Tom London	US	Actor	1963
October	3	Alan Dinehart	US	Actor	1944
October	12	Victor Potel	US	Actor	1947
October	13	Douglass Dumbrille	Canada	Actor	1974
November	10	Claude Rains	UK	Actor	1967
November	19	Clifton Webb	US	Actor	1966
November	30	Ramsay Hill	UK	Actor, technical advisor	1976
