= 1886 in film =

List of years in film
- … 1876; 1877; 1878; 1879; 1880; 1881; 1882; 1883; 1884; 1885; 1886; 1887; 1888; 1889; 1890; 1891; 1892; 1893; 1894; 1895; 1896 …
- In music 1883 1884 1885 1886 1887 1888 1889
- Art; Archaeology; Architecture; Literature; Music; Philosophy; Science; +...

The following is an overview of the events of 1886 in film, including a list of notable films

== Events ==
- Louis Le Prince is granted an American dual-patent on a 16-lens device that combines a motion picture camera with a projector.

== Births ==
Month	Date	Name	Country	Profession	Died
January	11	Chester Conklin	American	Actor	1971
February	9	Edwin Maxwell	Ireland	Actor	1948
March	6	Nella Walker	US	Actress	1971
March	7	Jessie Coles Grayson	US	Actress, Singer	1953
March	18	Edward Everett Horton	US	Actor	1970
April	2	Reginald Barker	Canada	Director	1945
April	8	Lily Elsie	UK	Singer, Actress	1962
April	13	Christian Rub	Austria	Actor	1956
May	26	Al Jolson	Lithuania	Actor, Singer	1950
July	1	Gabrielle Robinne	France	Actress	1980
July	26	Lars Hanson	Sweden	Actor	1965
September	22	Hobart Cavanaugh	US	Actor	1950
September	24	James Burke	US	Actor	1968
October	4	Luis Alberni	Spain	Actor	1962
October	12	Karl Dane	Denmark	Actor	1934
October	17	Spring Byington	US	Actor	1971
October	25	Leo G. Carroll	UK	Actor	1972
