= 1888 in film =

List of years in film
- … 1878; 1879; 1880; 1881; 1882; 1883; 1884; 1885; 1886; 1887; 1888; 1889; 1890; 1891; 1892; 1893; 1894; 1895; 1896; 1897; 1898 …
- In music 1885 1886 1887 1888 1889 1890 1891
- Art; Archaeology; Architecture; Literature; Music; Philosophy; Science; +...

The following is an overview of the events of 1888 in film, including a list of films released and notable births.

== Events ==
- George Eastman files for a patent for his photographic film.
- Thomas Edison meets with Eadweard Muybridge who proposes a scheme for sound film (27 February, West Orange, New Jersey).
- Étienne-Jules Marey starts work on his chronophotographe camera with 90 mm wide roll paper film.
- Charles-Émile Reynaud patents his Théâtre Optique which uses a kind of perforated film to create an animated show.

== Films ==
Roundhay Garden Scene, believed to be the world's earliest surviving motion-picture film

- Roundhay Garden Scene, Accordion Player and Traffic Crossing Leeds Bridge, filmed by Louis Aimé Augustin Le Prince in Leeds, United Kingdom, using paper "stripping" film and paper negative film.
- Horse and Rider Jumping Over an Obstacle (Pferd und Reiter Springen über ein Hindernis) and other sequences, shot by Ottomar Anschütz in Germany.

== Births ==
Month	Date	Name	Country	Profession	Died
January	3	George B. Seitz	US	Director, writer, actor, producer	1944
January	3	James Bridie	Scotland	Writer	1951
January	17	Edvard Persson	Sweden	Actor	1957
February	6	Lucile Gleason	US	Actress	1947
March	4	Rafaela Ottiano	Italy	Actress	1942
March	5	Jules Furthman	US	Writer, director, producer	1966
March	10	Barry Fitzgerald	Ireland	Actor	1961
March	30	Anna Q. Nilsson	Sweden	Actress	1974
April	11	Donald Calthrop	UK	Actor	1940
April	15	Florence Bates	US	Actress	1954
April	19	Pat West	US	Actor	1944
April	27	Florence La Badie	US	Actress	1917
May	7	Selmer Jackson	US	Actor	1971
May	17	Claude Mérelle	France	Actress	1976
May	25	Miles Malleson	UK	Actor, Writer	1969
July	4	Henry Armetta	Italy	Actor	1945
July	16	Percy Kilbride	US	Actor	1964
August	14	Robert Woolsey	US	Actor	1938
August	17	Monty Woolley	US	Actor	1963
August	29	Dina Romano	Italy	Actress	1957
September	12	Maurice Chevalier	France	Actor, Singer	1972
September	25	Hanna Ralph	Germany	Actress	1978
September	26	Wally Patch	UK	Actor, writer	1970
October	1	John E. Blakeley	UK	Producer, director, writer	1958
October	3	Claud Allister	UK	Actor	1970
October	9	Hank Patterson	US	Actor	1975
October	18	Paul Vermoyal	France	Actor	1925
October	25	Lester Cuneo	US	Actor, producer	1925
November	3	Maurice Vinot	France	Actor	1916
November	15	Andreas Malandrinos	Greece	Actor	1970
November	18	Frances Marion	US	Writer, director, producer, actress	1973
November	23	Nana Bryant	US	Actress	1955
November	23	Harpo Marx	US	Actor, writer	1964
November	24	Cathleen Nesbitt	UK	Actress	1982
November	25	Amund Rydland	Norway	Actor	1967
November	26	Francisco Canaro	Uruguay	Composer, Producer, Actor	1964
December	6	Will Hay	UK	Actor, writer, director	1949
December	18	Gladys Cooper	UK	Actress	1971
December	22	J. Arthur Rank	UK	Producer, writer	1972
December	27	Thea von Harbou	Germany	Actress, writer, director	1954
December	27	Svend Melsing	Denmark	Actor, Playwright	1946
December	28	F. W. Murnau	Germany	Director, writer, producer	1931
