= 1893 in music =

List of years in music	(table)
- … 1883; 1884; 1885; 1886; 1887; 1888; 1889; 1890; 1891; 1892; 1893; 1894; 1895; 1896; 1897; 1898; 1899; 1900; 1901; 1902; 1903 …
- In film 1890 1891 1892 1893 1894 1895 1896
- Art; Archaeology; Architecture; Literature; Music; Philosophy; Science; +...

Events in the year 1893 in music.

== Specific locations ==
- 1893 in Norwegian music

== Events ==
- February 9 – Première of Giuseppe Verdi's final opera Falstaff in La Scala in Milan with Victor Maurel in the title rôle.
- Summer – Gustav Mahler's first summer composing at his Komponierhäuschen ("composition hut") at Steinbach am Attersee in the Salzkammergut region of Austria.
- August 14–15 – America's oldest music organization, the Stoughton Musical Society performs at the World's Columbian Exposition.
- October 16–28 – In Saint Petersburg (Russia), Pyotr Ilyich Tchaikovsky conducts the first performance of his Symphony No. 6 in B minor, Op. 74, Pathétique (Патетическая), nine days before his death (attributed to cholera). The second performance takes place 21 days later at a memorial concert conducted by Eduard Nápravník, incorporating minor revisions. Tchaikovsky wrote it between February and the end of August at Klin.
- December 16 – Antonín Dvořák's Symphony No. 9 "From the New World" receives its première at Carnegie Hall in New York City.
- December 29 – Claude Debussy's String Quartet is premièred in Paris.
- American sisters Patty and Mildred J. Hill publish Song Stories for the Kindergarten including "Good Morning to All", which later becomes known as "Happy Birthday to You".
- The first sousaphone is built by James Welsh Pepper at the request of bandmaster John Philip Sousa in the United States.

== Published popular music ==
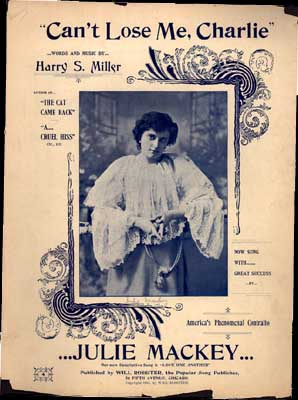

Selected compositions (words/music indicated by "w.m."):

- "Can't Lose Me, Charlie" w.m. Harry S. Miller
- "The Cat Came Back" w.m. Harry S. Miller
- "Daisy Bell" – Edward M. Favor (Edison Records)
- "December And May" w. Edward Marks m. William Lorraine
- "Do Do My Huckleberry Do" w. Harry Dillon m. John Dillon (the Dillon Brothers)
- "The Fatal Wedding" w. W. H. Windom m. Gussie L. Davis
- "Good Morning to All" w. Patty Smith Hill m. Mildred J. Hill
- "I Long to See The Girl I Left Behind" w.m. John T. Kelly
- "The Liberty Bell" by John Philip Sousa
- "Mamie, Come Kiss Your Honey" w.m. May Irwin
- "Marguerite" by Charles A. White
- "Oh! Mr Porter" w. Thomas Le Brunn m. George Le Brunn
- "Private Tommy Atkins" w. Henry Hamilton m. S. Potter
- "Say 'Au Revoir', But Not 'Good-Bye'" by Harry Kennedy
- "Sweet Marie" w. Cy Warman m. Raymond Moore
- "They All Take After Me" w. T. W. Connor m. Harry Randall
- "Two Little Girls in Blue" w.m. Charles Graham
- "The Volunteer Organist" w. William G. Gray m. Henry Lamb
- "When The Roll Is Called Up Yonder" w.m. James M. Black
- "Zacatecas" by Genaro Codina

== Recorded popular music ==
- "After the Ball (song)" – George J. Gaskin
- "After the Fair (Parody)" – George H. Diamond
- "Anvil Chorus" – John York AtLee
- "Beau Ideal March" – Baldwin's Cadet Band of Boston
- "Blind Tom" – Brilliant Quartette
- "The Cat Came Back" – George H. Diamond
- "Chinese Picnic" – Vess Ossman
- "Cocoanut Dance" – Vess Ossman
- "The Commodore Song" – Edward M. Favor
- "Daisy Bell" – Dan W. Quinn
- "Darkie Tickle" – Vess Ossman
- "Down On The Farm" – Edward Clarance
- "Forge in the Forest" – Voss' First Regiment Band
- "Grover Cleveland March" – Issler's Orchestra
- "High School Cadets" – Vess Ossman
- "If I Was Only Just Behind Her" – George H. Diamond
- "The King's Song" – Edward M. Favor
- "Lanciers With Figures Called" – Issler's Orchestra
- "The Liberty Bell (march)" – John Philip Sousa
- "Love's Sweet Honor" – Vess Ossman
- "Lovely Woman" – Al Reeves
- "Mama's Black Baby Boy" – Unique Quartette
- "The Man That Broke the Bank at Monte Carlo” – George H. Diamond
- "Marriage Bells" – Vess Ossman
- "Mary Ann Medley" – Brilliant Quartette (Columbia Records)
- "O Promise Me" – George J. Gaskin
- "Parody On "After the Ball" – George H. Diamond
- "Pat Brady and the World Fair at Chicago" – Dan Kelly
- "Wang's Gavotte" – Issler's Orchestra
- "The Washington Post (march)" – Vess Ossman
- "When Summer Comes Again" – George H. Diamond
- "Why Should I Keep From Whistling?" – John York AtLee & Fred Gaisberg

== Classical music ==
- Amy Beach – Gaelic Symphony
- Johannes Brahms
  - Six Pieces for Piano, Op. 118
  - Four Pieces for Piano, Op. 119
- Claude Debussy – String Quartet in G minor
- Antonín Dvořák – Symphony no. 9 in E minor, "From the New World"
- Edward German – Symphony in A minor, "Norwich"
- Johan Halvorsen – Entry of the Boyars
- Sergei Rachmaninoff
  - Fantaisie-Tableaux, for two pianos, Op. 5
  - Morceaux de salon for violin and piano, Op. 6
- Jean Sibelius – Lemminkäinen Suite
- William Stanley – Bay View Gavotte in A major
- Josef Suk – Quintet for Piano and Strings in G minor
- Pyotr Ilyich Tchaikovsky – Symphony no. 6 in B minor, "Pathétique"
- Charles-Marie Widor - Symphony no. 3 for organ & orchestra, Op. 69

== Opera ==
- Granville Bantock – Caedmar
- Julius Bechgaard – Frode premiered on May 11 in Copenhagen
- Engelbert Humperdinck – Hänsel und Gretel
- Isidore de Lara – Amy Robsart
- Emile Pessard
  - Une nuit de Noël premiered at the Ambigu, Paris
  - Mam'zelle Carabin premiered on November 3 at the Théâtre des Bouffes Parisiens, Salle Choiseul, Paris
- Giacomo Puccini – Manon Lescaut
- Camille Saint-Saëns – Phryné
- Giuseppe Verdi – Falstaff

== Musical theater ==
- A Gaiety Girl – London production opened at the Prince of Wales Theatre on October 14 and ran for 413 performances
- Jane Annie – London production opened at the Savoy Theatre on May 13 and ran for 50 performances
- Little Christopher Columbus – London production opened at the Lyric Theatre on October 10 and ran for 279 performances
- Morocco Bound (music Frank Osmond Carr lyrics: Adrian Ross) – London production opened at the Shaftesbury Theatre on April 13 and transferred to the Trafalgar Square Theatre on January 8, 1894, for a total run of 295 performances.
- A Trip To Chinatown – Broadway production
- Utopia Limited – London production opened at the Savoy Theatre on October 7 and ran for 245 performances

== Births ==
- February 10 – Jimmy Durante, American comedian and singer (died 1980)
- February 15 – Walter Donaldson, American songwriter (died 1947)
- February 21 – Andrés Segovia, Spanish classical guitarist (died 1987)
- March 8 – Mississippi John Hurt, American country blues singer and guitarist (died 1966)
- March 18 – Jean Goldkette, French-born American jazz pianist and bandleader (died 1962)
- April 2 – Sergei Protopopov, Russian composer and music theorist (died 1954)
- April 16 – Federico Mompou, Spanish classical composer (died 1987)
- April 18 – Georges Boulanger, Romanian violinist (died 1958)
- June 10 – Hattie McDaniel, singer and actress (died 1952)
- June 26 – Big Bill Broonzy, American blues singer, songwriter and guitarist (died 1958)
- June 28 – Luciano Gallet, Brazilian composer, pianist and conductor (died 1931)
- July 25 – Dorothy Dickson, American-born British singer and actress (died 1995)
- July 28 – Rued Langgaard, Danish composer and organist (died 1952)
- August 21 – Lili Boulanger, French composer (died 1918)
- August 22 – Dorothy Parker, American writer, poet and lyricist (died 1953)
- September 13 – Larry Shields, American Dixieland jazz clarinetist (died 1953)
- September 24 – Blind Lemon Jefferson, blues musician (died 1929)
- October 1 – Cliff Friend, American Tin Pan Alley songwriter (died 1974)
- October 23 – Jean Absil, Belgian composer and organist (died 1974)
- November 8 – Clarence Williams, American jazz pianist, composer, promoter, vocalist, theatrical producer and publisher (died 1965)
- December 7 — Fay Bainter, American actress (d. 1968)
- December 24 – Harry Warren, born Salvatore Antonio Guaragna, American film songwriter (died 1981)

== Deaths ==
- January 18 – Julius Eichberg, composer (b. 1824)
- February 13 – George Lichtenstein, pianist and music teacher (b. 1827)
- May 2 – Daniel Friedrich Eduard Wilsing, composer (b.1809)
- May 25 – Johann Rufinatscha, composer and music teacher (b. 1812)
- June 10 – Elek Erkel, Hungarian composer, son of Ferenc Erkel (b. 1843)
- June 25 – Ferenc Erkel, Hungarian composer (b. 1810)
- July 16 – Antonio Ghislanzoni, librettist (b. 1824)
- August 7 – Alfredo Catalani, composer (b. 1854)
- August 31 – Sir William Cusins, instrumentalist, conductor and composer; Master of the Queen's Music (b. 1833)
- September 8 – Michel Lentz, lyricist of the national anthem of Luxembourg (b. 1820)
- September 13 – Carl Ludvig Gerlach, opera singer and composer
- October 16 – Carlo Pedrotti, conductor and composer (b. 1817)
- October 18 – Charles Gounod, composer (b. 1818)
- November 6 – Pyotr Ilyich Tchaikovsky, composer (b. 1840)
- December 23 – Benedict Randhartinger, composer (b. 1802)
- date unknown – Félix Battanchon, cellist (b. 1814)
