= 1890 in film =

List of years in film
- … 1880; 1881; 1882; 1883; 1884; 1885; 1886; 1887; 1888; 1889; 1890; 1891; 1892; 1893; 1894; 1895; 1896; 1897; 1898; 1899; 1900 …
- In music 1887 1888 1889 1890 1891 1892 1893
- Art; Archaeology; Architecture; Literature; Music; Philosophy; Science; +...

Ten remaining frames of London's Trafalgar Square by Wordsworth Donisthorpe

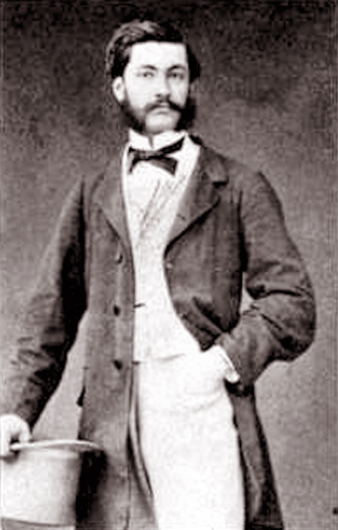
Louis Aimé Augustin Le Prince, 28 August 1841.

The following is an overview of the events of 1890 in film, including a list of films released and notable births and deaths.

== Events ==
- The first moving pictures were developed on celluloid film by William Friese Greene, a British inventor, in Hyde Park, London in 1889. The process was patented in 1890.
- William K. L. Dickson completes his work for Thomas Edison on the Kinetograph cylinder either in this year or 1889. Monkeyshines No. 1 becomes the first film shot on the system.

== Films ==
- London's Trafalgar Square, directed by William Carr Croft and Wordsworth Donisthorpe.
- Monkeyshines, No. 1 – contradictory sources indicate this was shot either in June 1889 or November 1890, Monkeyshines, No. 2 and Monkeyshines, No. 3, directed by William K. L. Dickson.
- Mosquinha, directed by Étienne-Jules Marey.
- Traffic in King's Road, Chelsea, directed by William Friese-Greene.

== Births ==
Month	Date	Name	Country	Profession	Died
January	10	Pina Menichelli	Italy	Actress	1984
January	30	Bruno Kastner	Germany	Actor	1932
February	17	Sol Lesser	US	Producer	1980
February	18	Edward Arnold	US	Actor	1956
February	18	Adolphe Menjou	US	Actor	1963
February	24	Marjorie Main	US	Actress	1975
March	3	Edmund Lowe	US	Actor	1971
March	17	Ted Adams	US	Actor	1973
March	20	Fania Marinoff	US	Actress	1971
April	26	Edgar Kennedy	US	Actor	1948
May	7	George Archainbaud	France	Director	1959
May	23	Herbert Marshall	UK	Actor	1966
June	1	Frank Morgan	US	Actor	1949
June	10	William A. Seiter	US	Director	1964
June	14	May Allison	US	Actress	1989
June	16	Stan Laurel	UK	Actor	1965
June	18	Gideon Wahlberg	Sweden	Actor, screenwriter, director	1948
June	25	Charlotte Greenwood	US	Actress, dancer	1977
August	2	Marin Sais	US	Actress	1971
August	22	Cecil Kellaway	South Africa	Actor	1973
August	27	Man Ray	US	Photographer, Director	1976
September	4	Gunnar Sommerfeldt	Denmark	Actor, director	1947
September	4	Naima Wifstrand	Sweden	Singer, Actress, Composer, Director	1968
October	1	Alice Joyce	US	Actress	1955
October	1	Stanley Holloway	UK	Actor	1982
October	2	Groucho Marx	US	Comedian, Actor	1977
October	3	Henry Hull	US	Actor	1977
October	6	Jack Rockwell	US	Actor	1947
November	20	Robert Armstrong	US	Actor	1973

== Deaths ==
- c. 16 September – Louis Le Prince, French film pioneer, director of Roundhay Garden Scene (born 1842)
