= 1892 in film =

List of years in film
- … 1882; 1883; 1884; 1885; 1886; 1887; 1888; 1889; 1890; 1891; 1892; 1893; 1894; 1895; 1896; 1897; 1898; 1899; 1900; 1901; 1902 …
- In music 1889 1890 1891 1892 1893 1894 1895
- Art; Archaeology; Architecture; Literature; Music; Philosophy; Science; +...

The following is an overview of the events of 1892 in film, including a list of films released and notable births.

== Events ==
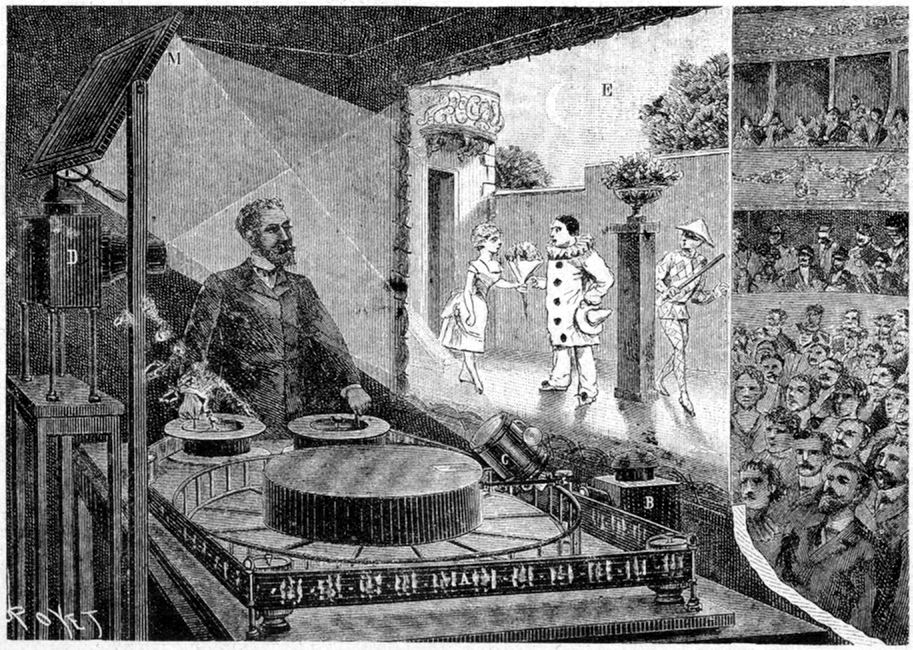
Projection of film at the Théâtre Optique

- The final revisions to the Kinetoscope are made, including a vertical transport and wider film. This becomes the de facto technical specification for all silent film by 1909.
- Max Skladanowsky develops a camera and shoots his first footage this year, but its unusual interleaved image format leaves him ultimately unable to exhibit it until work is completed on the Bioskop projector in late 1895.
- October 18 – Théâtre Optique event opens, showing projected motion pictures to the public at the Musée Grévin in Paris.

== Films released in 1892 ==
Pauvre Pierrot

- Le Clown et ses chiens, a lost animated film directed by Charles-Émile Reynaud.
- Pauvre Pierrot, an animated film directed by Charles-Émile Reynaud.
- Un bon bock, a lost animated film directed by Charles-Émile Reynaud.
- Fencing, directed by William K. L. Dickson.
- A Hand Shake, directed by William Heise and William K. L. Dickson.
- Man on Parallel Bars, directed by William K. L. Dickson.
- Wrestling, directed by William K. L. Dickson.
- Boxing, made by Edison Manufacturing Company.

== Births ==
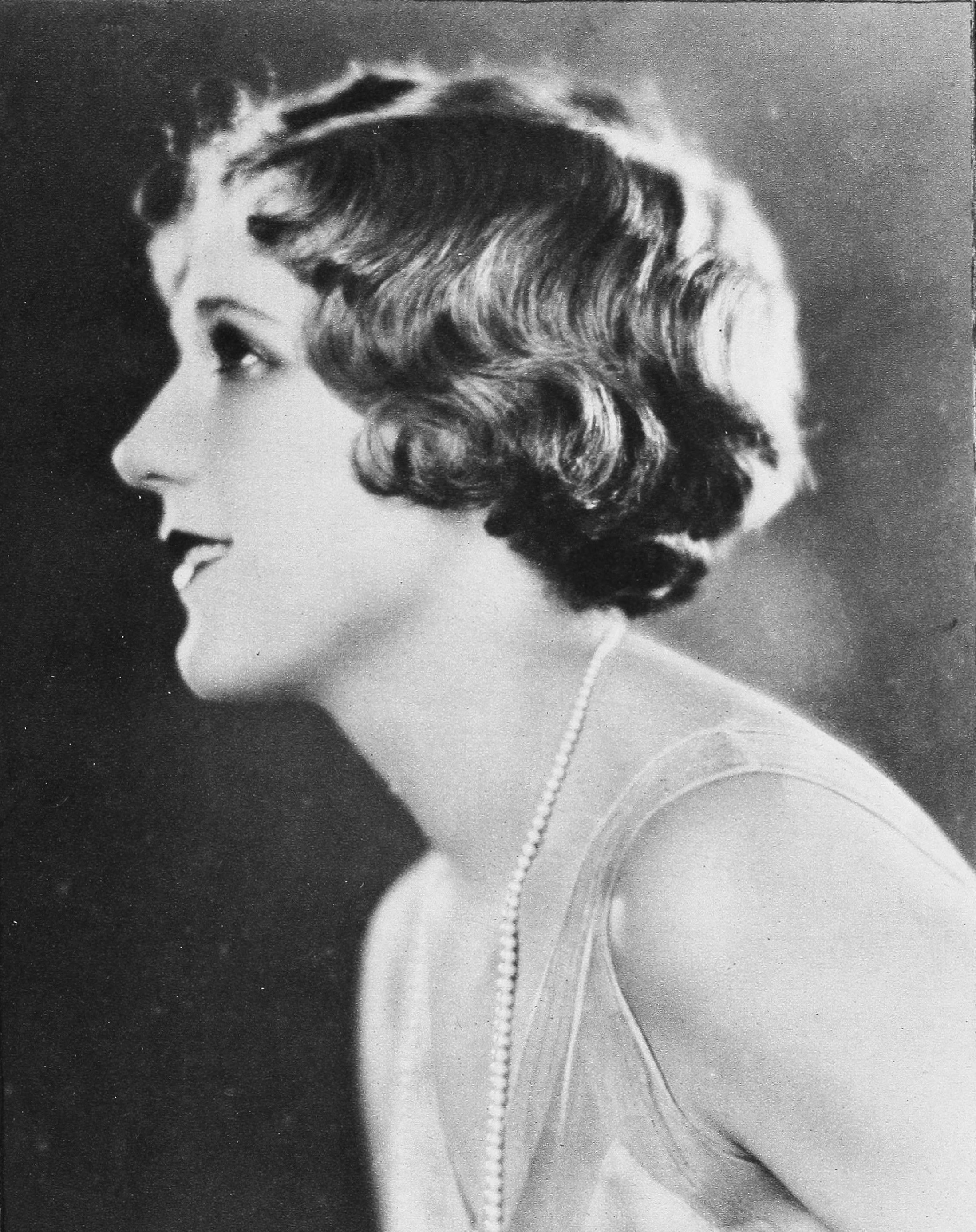
Mary Pickford.

Month	Date	Name	Country	Profession	Died
January	18	Oliver Hardy	US	Actor	1957
January	29	Ernst Lubitsch	Germany	Director, producer, writer, actor	1947
January	31	Eddie Cantor	US	Singer, Comedian	1964
February	10	Alan Hale Sr.	US	Actor, director	1950
February	27	William Demarest	US	Actor	1983
March	27	Dorrit Weixler	Germany	Actress	1916
April	2	Jack L. Warner	US	Hollywood studio founder	1978
April	4	Esther Howard	US	Actress	1965
April	8	Mary Pickford	Canada	Actress, Studio founder	1979
April	14	Claire Windsor	US	Actress	1972
May	11	Margaret Rutherford	UK	Actress	1972
May	13	Frank Rice	US	Actor	1936
May	28	Minna Gombell	US	Actress	1973
June	13	Basil Rathbone	South Africa	Actor	1967
July	1	Thomas Mitchell	US	Actor	1962
July	10	Slim Summerville	US	Actor	1946
July	14	Al Hill	US	Actor	1954
July	21	Renée Jeanne Falconetti	France	Actress	1946
July	29	William Powell	US	Actor	1984
September	2	Dezső Kertész	Hungary	Actor, director	1965
September	9	Tsuru Aoki	Japan	Actress	1961
September	21	Olof Ås	Sweden	Actor, stage manager	1949
September	28	Ruth Stonehouse	US	Actress, director	1941
October	5	Leyland Hodgson	UK	Actor	1949
October	25	Nell Shipman	US	Actress, writer, producer	1970
November	16	Mabel Normand	US	Actress	1930
December	5	Cyril Ring	US	Actor	1967
December	24	Ruth Chatterton	US	Actress	1961
December	29	Aku Korhonen	Russia	Actor	1960
December	30	John Litel	US	Actor	1972
December	31	Jason Robards Sr.	US	Actor	1963
