= 1880s in film =

| List of years in film |
- … 1870; 1871; 1872; 1873; 1874; 1875; 1876; 1877; 1878; 1879; 1880; 1881; 1882; 1883; 1884; 1885; 1886; 1887; 1888; 1889; 1890 …
- In television 1877 1878 1879 1880 1881 1882 1883
- Art; Archaeology; Architecture; Literature; Music; Philosophy; Science; +...

The decade of the 1880s in film involved significant events.

== Events ==
- 1880 – American George Eastman begins to commercially manufacture dry plates for photography.
- 1880 – Eadweard Muybridge holds a public demonstration of his Zoopraxiscope, a magic lantern provided with a rotating disc with artist's renderings of Muybridge's chronophotographic sequences. It was used as a demonstration device by Muybridge in his illustrated lecture (the original preserved in the Museum of Kingston upon Thames in England).
- January 1, 1881 – American inventor George Eastman founds the Eastman Dry Plate Company, eventually known as Kodak.
- 1882 – American inventor George Eastman begins experimenting with new types of photographic film, with his employee, William Walker.
- 1882 – French physiologist Étienne-Jules Marey invents the chronophotographic gun, the camera shaped like a rifle that photographs twelve successive images each second.
- 1885 – American inventors George Eastman and Hannibal Goodwin each invent a sensitized celluloid base roll photographic film to replace the glass plates then in use.
- 1887 – Hannibal Goodwin files for a patent for his photographic film.
- 1888 - Louis Le Prince creates the oldest surviving film, Roundhay Garden Scene. Recorded in Leeds, Yorkshire, England, the footage lasts a mere 2.11 seconds.
- 1888 – George Eastman files for a patent for his photographic film.
- 1888 – Thomas Edison meets with Eadweard Muybridge to discuss adding sound to moving pictures. Edison begins his own experiments.
- 1889 – American inventor George Eastman's celluloid base roll photographic film becomes commercially available.

== Births ==
This is a list of actors and filmmakers who were born between years 1880 and 1884. See also:

- 1885 born actors and filmmakers
- 1886 born actors and filmmakers
- 1887 born actors and filmmakers
- 1888 born actors and filmmakers
- 1889 born actors and filmmakers

| Year | Month | Date | Name | Country | Profession | Died |
| 1880 | January | 6 | Tom Mix | US | Actor | 1940 |
| 1880 | January | 17 | Mack Sennett | US | Actor, producer, director | 1960 |
| 1880 | January | 29 | W. C. Fields | US | Actor | 1946 |
| 1880 | February | 8 | Viktor Schwanneke | Germany | Actor | 1931 |
| 1880 | February | 9 | Howard Hickman | US | Actor, director, writer | 1949 |
| 1880 | February | 18 | Egon Brecher | Austria | Actor, director | 1946 |
| 1880 | February | 28 | Hale Hamilton | US | Actor, writer, producer | 1942 |
| 1880 | March | 10 | Broncho Billy Anderson | US | Actor | 1971 |
| 1880 | April | 13 | Charles Christie | Canada | Film Studio Owner | 1955 |
| 1880 | June | 7 | Thorleif Lund | Norway | Actor | 1956 |
| 1880 | July | 12 | Tod Browning | US | Director | 1962 |
| 1880 | August | 6 | Hans Moser | Austria | Actor | 1964 |
| 1880 | October | 23 | Una O'Connor | Ireland | Actress | 1959 |
| 1880 | November | 2 | Fritz Achterberg | Germany | Actor | 1971 |
| 1880 | December | 10 | Fred Immler | Germany | Actor | 1965 |
| 1881 | January | 24 | Elsa Wagner | Germany | Actress | 1975 |
| 1881 | February | 10 | Pauline Brunius | Sweden | Actress, director, screenwriter | 1954 |
| 1881 | August | 12 | Cecil B. DeMille | US | Director, producer | 1959 |
| 1881 | September | 11 | Asta Nielsen | Denmark | Actress | 1972 |
| 1881 | November | 13 | Carl Schenstrøm | Denmark | Actor | 1942 |
| 1881 | November | 24 | Al Christie | Canada | Director, producer | 1951 |
| 1881 | December | 5 | René Cresté | France | Actor, director | 1922 |
| 1882 | January | 17 | Noah Beery | US | Actor | 1946 |
| 1882 | January | 23 | Eero Kilpi | Finland | Actor | 1954 |
| 1882 | February | 15 | John Barrymore | US | Actor | 1942 |
| 1882 | February | 27 | George Terwilliger | US | Director, screenwriter | 1970 |
| 1882 | May | 10 | Thurston Hall | US | Actor | 1958 |
| 1882 | May | 16 | Mary Gordon | Scotland | Actress | 1963 |
| 1882 | May | 23 | James Gleason | US | Actor, screenwriter | 1959 |
| 1882 | July | 27 | Donald Crisp | US | Actor | 1974 |
| 1882 | August | 6 | Ernst Eklund | Sweden | Actor | 1971 |
| 1882 | September | 10 | Paul Harvey | US | Actor | 1955 |
| 1882 | October | 20 | Bela Lugosi | Hungary | Actor | 1956 |
| 1883 | January | 10 | Francis X. Bushman | US | Actor | 1966 |
| 1883 | January | 10 | Florence Reed | US | Actress | 1967 |
| 1883 | February | 22 | Marguerite Clark | US | Actress | 1940 |
| 1883 | February | 22 | Harry Depp | US | Actor | 1957 |
| 1883 | February | 22 | Olga Svendsen | Denmark | Actress | 1942 |
| 1883 | March | 4 | Maude Fealy | US | Actress | 1971 |
| 1883 | March | 26 | Poul Reumert | Denmark | Actor | 1968 |
| 1883 | April | 1 | Lon Chaney | US | Actor | 1930 |
| 1883 | April | 1 | Edvard Drabløs | Norway | Actor, director | 1976 |
| 1883 | April | 1 | Frédéric Mariotti | France | Actor | 1971 |
| 1883 | April | 2 | Pearl Doles Bell | US | Scenarist, Editor | 1968 |
| 1883 | April | 6 | Walter Huston | Canada | Actor | 1950 |
| 1883 | May | 1 | Tom Moore | Ireland | Actor | 1955 |
| 1883 | May | 6 | Alberto Collo | Italy | Actor | 1955 |
| 1883 | May | 20 | Stanley Fields | US | Actor | 1941 |
| 1883 | May | 23 | Douglas Fairbanks | US | Actor | 1939 |
| 1883 | June | 13 | Merta Sterling | US | Actress | 1944 |
| 1883 | August | 12 | Marion Lorne | US | Actress | 1968 |
| 1883 | August | 19 | Elsie Ferguson | US | Actress | 1961 |
| 1883 | September | 3 | Robert Middlemass | US | Actor, Playwright | 1949 |
| 1883 | October | 5 | Ernst Pittschau | Germany | Actor | 1951 |
| 1883 | November | 19 | Ned Sparks | Canada | Actor | 1957 |
| 1883 | December | 16 | Max Linder | France | Actor | 1925 |
| 1883 | December | 24 | Stefan Jaracz | Poland | Actor | 1945 |
| 1884 | February | 14 | Nils Olaf Chrisander | Sweden | Actor, director | 1947 |
| 1884 | February | 16 | Robert J. Flaherty | US | Filmmaker | 1951 |
| 1884 | April | 30 | Olof Sandborg | Sweden | Actor | 1965 |
| 1884 | May | 8 | Valdemar Psilander | Denmark | Actor | 1917 |
| 1884 | May | 10 | Olga Petrova | UK | Actress | 1977 |
| 1884 | May | 26 | Charles Winninger | US | Actor | 1969 |
| 1884 | May | 28 | Edward Keane | US | Actor | 1959 |
| 1884 | July | 12 | Louis B. Mayer | Russia | Producer | 1957 |
| 1884 | July | 23 | Emil Jannings | Germany | Actor | 1950 |
| 1884 | July | 24 | Maria Caserini | Italy | Actress | 1969 |
| 1884 | August | 7 | Billie Burke | US | Actress | 1970 |
| 1884 | August | 11 | Hermann Wlach | Austria | Actor | 1962 |
| 1884 | August | 25 | James C. Morton | US | Actor | 1942 |
| 1884 | October | 4 | Ida Wüst | Germany | Actress | 1958 |
| 1884 | October | 11 | Sig Ruman | Germany | Actor | 1967 |
| 1884 | October | 24 | Emil Fjellström | Sweden | Actor | 1944 |
| 1884 | December | 1 | Torben Meyer | Denmark | Actor | 1975 |
| 1884 | December | 31 | Mihály Fekete | Hungary | Actor, screenwriter, director | 1960 |

== Lists of films ==
- 1885 in film
- 1886 in film
- 1887 in film
- 1888 in film
- 1889 in film

== See also ==
- Film
- History of film
- Lists of films
