= List of years in film =

This page indexes the individual year in film pages. Each year is annotated with its significant events.

- 1820s–1890s
- 1900s–1925
- 1926–1975
- 1976–2025
- 2026–present

== 1826–1899 ==
- 1826 – View from the Window at Le Gras; Nicéphore Niépce takes the oldest known extant photograph.
- 1833 – Since 1833 and onward, "animated films"—or, rather, animated effects—began to be created with the use of choreutoscopes, phénakisticopes, zoetropes, and praxinoscopes.
- 1865 – Revolving, self-portrait by French photographer Nadar. Around 1865, Nadar produced Revolving—a series of self-portraits consisting of 12 frames showing different angles of him sitting still in a chair. Except for a smile in one frame, not even a fold in his jacket or a single hair seems to change between the different angles. The portrait could be regarded as a predecessor to the chronophotography, with which Marey and Muybridge started to experiment more than 10 years later. As the sequence revolves around space, rather than time, it is even more related to the bullet-time effect popularized by The Matrix about 135 years later. There is no clue if more than one camera was used in the shoot, but it is certainly well-executed.
- 1874 – Passage de Vénus, first precedent of a film. On December 9, 1874, French astronomer Pierre Janssen and Brazilian engineer Francisco Antônio de Almeida created Passage de Vénus using Janssen's "photographic revolver" to photograph the transit of the planet Venus across the Sun. The photographs were purportedly taken in Japan. It is the oldest film on IMDb.

Before British photographer Eadweard Muybridge's 1878 work, photo sequences were not recorded in real-time because light-sensitive emulsions needed a long exposure time. The sequences were basically made as time-lapse recordings. It is possible that people at the time actually viewed such photographs come to life with a phénakisticope or zoetrope. (This certainly happened with Muybridge's work.)

- 1878 –
  - The Horse in Motion; Muybridge took a series of "automatic electro-photographs" depicting the movement of a horse. He shot the photographs in June 1878. An additional card reprinted the single image of the horse "Occident" trotting at high speed, which had previously been published by Muybridge in 1877. The most famous of these electro-photographs is "Sallie Gardner," taken on June 19, 1878. Railroad tycoon Leland Stanford hired Muybridge to settle the questions of whether a galloping horse ever has all four of its feet off the ground. Muybridge's photos showed the horse with all four feet off the ground. He went on a lecture tour showing his photographs on a moving-image device he called the zoopraxiscope.
  - Le singe musicien, first animated movie using the praxinoscope.
- 1885 – American inventors George Eastman and Hannibal Goodwin each invented a sensitized celluloid base roll photographic film to replace the glass plates then in use. L'homme Machine was directed by French scientist Étienne-Jules Marey; it is the oldest known black and white animated film.
- 1886 – Louis Le Prince was granted an American dual-patent for a 16-lens device, which combines a motion picture camera with a projector.
- 1887 – Man Walking Around a Corner, directed by French inventor Louis Le Prince; it is the oldest known film. Although, according to David Wilkinson's 2015 documentary The First Film, it is not film, but a series of photographs, 16 in all, each taken from one of the lenses from Le Prince's camera. Pictures from the film were sent in a letter dated August 18, 1887, to Le Prince's wife. Le Prince later developed the one-lens camera, and, on October 14, 1888, he finally made the world's first moving image, Roundhay Garden Scene.
- 1888 – Roundhay Garden Scene, the earliest surviving film by French inventor Louis Le Prince; is shot in Leeds, West Yorkshire, in England with a groundbreaking 20 frames per second. Other short films made at the same time were Accordion Player and Traffic Crossing Leeds Bridge.
- 1889 – Eastman Kodak is the first company to begin commercial production of film on a flexible transparent base, celluloid.
- 1891 – Dickson Greeting, Men Boxing, Newark Athlete
- 1892 – Le Clown et ses chiens, Pauvre Pierrot, Un bon bock; first projected animated films released by Émile Reynaud
- 1893 – Blacksmiths, the first film shown publicly on the Kinetoscope, a system given to Edison; Thomas Edison created "America's First Film Studio", Black Maria
- 1894 –
  - Carmencita, directed by William K.L. Dickson, who was the Scottish inventor credited with the invention of the motion picture camera under the employ of Edison. According to film historian Charles Musser, the film featured the first woman to appear in front of an Edison motion picture camera, who may have also been the first woman to appear in a motion picture in the United States.
  - The Dickson Experimental Sound Film, made by Dickson in late 1894 or early 1895, is the first known film with live-recorded sound and appears to be the first motion picture made for the Kinetophone, the proto-sound-film system developed by Dickson and Edison.
- 1895 – In Paris on December 28, 1895, the Lumière brothers screen 10 films at the Salon Indien du Grand Café in Paris making the first commercial public screening ever made, marked traditionally as the birth date of the film. Gaumont, the oldest ever film studio, was founded by inventor Léon Gaumont.
- 1896 – L'Arrivée d'un train en gare de La Ciotat, one of the six additional short films released by the Lumière brothers; Pathé-Frères is founded; Le Manoir du diable (The Haunted Castle) is a French short silent film directed by Georges Méliès, which depicts a pantomimed sketch in the style of a theatrical comic fantasy.
- 1897 – Vitagraph is founded in New York City
- 1898 –The Astronomer's Dream, The Cavalier's Dream, Photographing a Ghost, Santa Claus
- 1898 – Shinin No Sosei and Bake Jizo were made by Ejiro Hatta, some of the first films in Japan that were ghost stories. Salvador Toscano created the film "Don Juan Tenorio", which is considered one of the first films in Mexico and perhaps the first fictional film in Mexico, as South America, as a continent, focuses on making documentaries in its early film history.
- 1898 – Hiralal Sen was inspired by and filmed the play the Flower of Persia
- 1899 – The Dreyfus Affair and Cendrillon (first screen adaptation of the traditional fairy tale Cinderella) was released by Georges Méliès; earliest known use of a color motion picture film footage by Edward Raymond Turner

== 1900–1925 ==
- 1900 – Sherlock Holmes Baffled, Joan of Arc
- 1901 – Blue Beard, Star Theatre, Stop Thief!, Scrooge, or, Marley's Ghost
- 1902 – A Trip to the Moon, The Coronation of Edward VII, The Little Match Seller
- 1903 – The Great Train Robbery, The Infernal Cauldron, Life of an American Fireman, The Kingdom of the Fairies
- 1904 – The Impossible Voyage; Titanus was founded
- 1905 – Adventures of Sherlock Holmes; or, Held for Ransom
- 1906 – The Story of the Kelly Gang, The Merry Frolics of Satan, The '?' Motorist, Dream of a Rarebit Fiend, Humorous Phases of Funny Faces; Nordisk Film was founded
- 1907 – That Fatal Sneeze, Ben-Hur, The Eclipse, or the Courtship of the Sun and Moon, L'Enfant prodigue
- 1908 – Fantasmagorie, The Taming of the Shrew, The Thieving Hand, The Assassination of the Duke of Guise, The Adventures of Dollie; Pathé News invented the newsreel
- 1909 – The Country Doctor, A Corner in Wheat, Princess Nicotine; or, The Smoke Fairy, Les Misérables; 35 mm film becomes a filmmaking standard across the world; first public screening of Kinemacolor
- 1910 – Frankenstein, In Old California, In the Border States, Jean the Match-Maker, White Fawn's Devotion
- 1911 – L'Inferno, Baron Munchausen's Dream, Defence of Sevastopol, The Lonedale Operator
- 1912 – The Cameraman's Revenge, Falling Leaves, Independenţa României, The Musketeers of Pig Alley, Richard III; Universal Pictures and Paramount Pictures, Hollywood's two oldest major film studios, were founded; the British Board of Film Classification was established
- 1913 – The Bangville Police, Fantômas, Barney Oldfield's Race for a Life, Raja Harishchandra, The Student Of Prague; invention of the film trailer
- 1914 – The Perils of Pauline, Tillie's Punctured Romance, Judith of Bethulia, Gertie the Dinosaur
- 1915 – The Birth of a Nation, The Tramp, Les Vampires, The Cheat
- 1916 – Intolerance, 20,000 Leagues Under the Sea, Judex; invention of Technicolor
- 1917 – Rebecca of Sunnybrook Farm, A Man There Was, The Immigrant
- 1918 – The Outlaw and His Wife, Stella Maris, Mickey, Shifting Sands, Shoulder Arms
- 1919 – Blind Husbands, Broken Blossoms, True Heart Susie, Dalagang Bukid, Male and Female, Wagon Tracks; United Artists was founded
- 1920 – The Cabinet of Dr. Caligari, Way Down East, The Penalty, The Mark of Zorro, Dr. Jekyll and Mr. Hyde, The Golem: How He Came into the World, Within Our Gates
- 1921 – The Four Horsemen of the Apocalypse, The Kid, The Phantom Carriage, Fool's Paradise, The Sheik, The Mechanical Man, Destiny, The Three Musketeers
- 1922 – Nosferatu, Foolish Wives, The Little Rascals, Blood and Sand, Nanook of the North, Douglas Fairbanks in Robin Hood, Sherlock Holmes, Dr. Mabuse the Gambler; the Motion Picture Association of America was established
- 1923 – Safety Last!, The Hunchback of Notre Dame, The Ten Commandments; Warner Bros. Pictures and Walt Disney Pictures were founded; 16 mm film was introduced
- 1924 – The Thief of Bagdad, Greed, The Hands Of Orlac, Sherlock Jr., The Last Laugh, He Who Gets Slapped, Die Nibelungen; Metro-Goldwyn-Mayer and Columbia Pictures were founded
- 1925 – The Gold Rush, The Battleship Potemkin, The Big Parade, The Phantom of the Opera, Ben-Hur, The Lost World, The Pleasure Garden

== 1926–1975 ==
- 1926 – The General, Don Juan, The Black Pirate, Faust
- 1927 – The Jazz Singer, Metropolis, Wings, Sunrise: A Song of Two Humans, Napoléon, The King of Kings
- 1928 – The Man Who Laughs, Lights of New York, The Circus, The Singing Fool, In Old Arizona; RKO Pictures was founded
- 1929 – Blackmail, Un Chien Andalou, Pandora's Box, Man with a Movie Camera, The Broadway Melody, Disraeli, The Virginian; 1st Academy Awards
- 1930 – King of Jazz, All Quiet on the Western Front, Earth, Journey's End, The Blue Angel, The Bat Whispers, Murder!, Animal Crackers, Hell's Angels, The Big House, The Big Trail
- 1931 – Frankenstein, Dracula, The Champ, The Public Enemy, Little Caesar, Cimarron, M, City Lights, The Front Page, Dr. Jekyll and Mr. Hyde
- 1932 – Shanghai Express, Scarface, Tarzan the Ape Man, The Mummy, Freaks, The Music Box, Trouble in Paradise, The Sign of the Cross, Grand Hotel; 8mm film was introduced
- 1933 – King Kong, Gold Diggers of 1933, The Invisible Man, 42nd Street, Duck Soup, Sons of the Desert, She Done Him Wrong
- 1934 – L'Atalante, It Happened One Night, The Thin Man, Cleopatra, The Goddess, Imitation of Life, Manhattan Melodrama, The Black Cat, Bright Eyes
- 1935 – A Night at the Opera, Bride of Frankenstein, The 39 Steps, Top Hat, Mutiny on the Bounty; 20th Century Fox and The Rank Organisation was founded
- 1936 – Modern Times, Swing Time, Mr. Deeds Goes to Town, Flash Gordon, My Man Godfrey, The Great Ziegfeld, Come and Get It, Romeo and Juliet, Camille
- 1937 – Snow White and the Seven Dwarfs, The Life of Emile Zola, La Grande Illusion, Pépé le Moko, The Prisoner of Zenda, Lost Horizon
- 1938 – Bringing Up Baby, The Adventures of Robin Hood, Alexander Nevsky, Jezebel, A Christmas Carol, Boys Town, Angels with Dirty Faces
- 1939 – Gone with the Wind, The Wizard of Oz, The Rules of the Game, Sherlock Holmes, The Hunchback of Notre Dame, Of Mice and Men, Mr. Smith Goes to Washington, Stagecoach
- 1940 – Pinocchio, The Grapes of Wrath, The Philadelphia Story, The Shop Around the Corner, Foreign Correspondent, The Great Dictator, Christmas in July, Brother Orchid, Ahí está el detalle, All This and Heaven Too, Rebecca, The Letter, His Girl Friday, The Great McGinty, Fantasia, They Drive by Night
- 1941 – Citizen Kane, Sergeant York, Ball of Fire, How Green Was My Valley, The Maltese Falcon, Sullivan's Travels, 49th Parallel, The Black Cat, Blossoms in the Dust, High Sierra, The Shanghai Gesture, Suspicion, The Wolf Man, Here Comes Mr. Jordan, The Lady Eve, Meet John Doe
- 1942 – Casablanca, The Magnificent Ambersons, To Be or Not to Be, The Pride of the Yankees, All Through the Night, I Married a Witch, Bambi, The Palm Beach Story, Kings Row, Cat People, Woman of the Year, Yankee Doodle Dandy, Mrs. Miniver
- 1943 – The Life and Death of Colonel Blimp, Day of Wrath, Meshes of the Afternoon, The Human Comedy, Shadow of a Doubt, Angels of the Streets, For Whom the Bell Tolls, Ossessione, Heaven Can Wait, María Candelaria, The Ox-Bow Incident, Phantom of the Opera, The Song of Bernadette, Stormy Weather, Ukraine in Flames, Journey into Fear, Jane Eyre, Madame Curie
- 1944 – Double Indemnity, Gaslight, The Children Are Watching Us, To Have And Have Not, Going My Way, Henry V, Arsenic and Old Lace, A Canterbury Tale, Casanova Brown, Hail the Conquering Hero, House of Frankenstein, Meet Me in St. Louis, Mr. Skeffington, Mrs. Parkington, National Velvet, Since You Went Away
- 1945 – Rome, Open City, Children of Paradise, The Lost Weekend, The Bells of St. Mary's, Brief Encounter, Les dames du Bois de Boulogne, Love Letters, Mildred Pierce, The Picture of Dorian Gray, The Seventh Veil, Spellbound, Anchors Aweigh, And Then There Were None, Blithe Spirit, Christmas in Connecticut, Fallen Angel, I Know Where I'm Going!, Ivan the Terrible, Part One
- 1946 – The Best Years of Our Lives, The Big Sleep, Beauty and the Beast, Notorious, It's a Wonderful Life, My Darling Clementine, A Matter of Life and Death, A Night in Casablanca, Paisan, The Postman Always Rings Twice, The Razor's Edge, Shoeshine, The Spiral Staircase, The Strange Love of Martha Ivers, The Stranger, The Yearling, The Blue Dahlia, Duel in the Sun, Gilda, Great Expectations, The Killers
- 1947 – Black Narcissus, Out of the Past, Monsieur Verdoux, Dark Passage, The Pearl, Dead Reckoning, Gentleman's Agreement, The Spring River Flows East, Miracle on 34th Street, Mourning Becomes Electra, Odd Man Out, The Bishop's Wife, Body and Soul, Boomerang, Kiss of Death, The Lady from Shanghai, Brute Force, Crossfire, The Ghost and Mrs. Muir
- 1948 – Bicycle Thieves, The Red Shoes, Spring in a Small Town, Letter from an Unknown Woman, The Treasure of the Sierra Madre, The Snake Pit, Sorry, Wrong Number, Abbott and Costello Meet Frankenstein, Blood on the Moon, Drunken Angel, Fort Apache, Germany Year Zero, Johnny Belinda, Key Largo, Louisiana Story, Macbeth, Red River, Rope, The Search, Hamlet, He Walked by Night, I Remember Mama
- 1949 – The Third Man, Late Spring, White Heat, All the King's Men, Kind Hearts and Coronets, A Letter to Three Wives, Little Women, On the Town, She Wore a Yellow Ribbon, Stray Dog, Twelve O'Clock High, Adam's Rib, Aventurera, Criss Cross, The Heiress
- 1950 – Samson and Delilah, Rashomon, Sunset Boulevard, Los Olvidados, In a Lonely Place, All About Eve, Winchester '73, The Gunfighter, Harvey, The Asphalt Jungle, Cinderella, Father of the Bride, The Flowers of St. Francis, Orphée, La Ronde, Stromboli
- 1951 – Quo Vadis, Alice in Wonderland, Diary of a Country Priest, A Streetcar Named Desire, The African Queen, A Place in the Sun, Ace in the Hole, An American in Paris, Early Summer, The Lavender Hill Mob, The River, Strangers on a Train, The Tales of Hoffmann, The Browning Version, Death of a Salesman, Detective Story
- 1952 – Singin' in the Rain, Ikiru, Umberto D., The Quiet Man, High Noon, Pat and Mike, Viva Zapata!, Limelight, Mexican Bus Ride, 5 Fingers, The Bad and the Beautiful, Children of Hiroshima, Come Back, Little Sheba, Europa '51, The Life of Oharu, Othello
- 1953 – Tokyo Story, Ugetsu, The Wages of Fear, From Here to Eternity, Roman Holiday, I Vitelloni, Shane, The Earrings of Madame de..., Sawdust and Tinsel, Stalag 17, Monsieur Hulot's Holiday
- 1954 – Sansho the Bailiff, On the Waterfront, Seven Samurai, La strada, Rear Window, The Caine Mutiny, Journey to Italy, Magnificent Obsession, River of No Return, Senso, Johnny Guitar, A Star Is Born, The Crucified Lovers, Seven Brides for Seven Brothers, Désirée, Sabrina, Salt of the Earth, Vera Cruz
- 1955 – East of Eden, The Criminal Life of Archibaldo de la Cruz, Ordet, Pather Panchali, The Night of the Hunter, Rebel Without a Cause, The Man with the Golden Arm, Lady and the Tramp, All That Heaven Allows, Les Diaboliques, Escuela de vagabundos, Guys and Dolls, Kiss Me Deadly, Oklahoma!, Richard III, Rififi, The Rose Tattoo, To Catch a Thief
- 1956 – The Searchers, A Man Escaped, Giant, The Burmese Harp, Written on the Wind, The Ten Commandments, The Man Who Knew Too Much, Early Spring, The King and I, The Red Balloon, Night And Fog, Friendly Persuasion, Aparajito, Invasion of the Body Snatchers, The Killing, Anastasia
- 1957 – The Seventh Seal, 12 Angry Men, Paths of Glory, The Cranes Are Flying, Wild Strawberries, The Bridge on the River Kwai, Nights of Cabiria, Throne of Blood, Sweet Smell of Success, Funny Face, Sayonara, Heaven Knows, Mr. Allison, Peyton Place, Raintree County
- 1958 – Vertigo, Cat on a Hot Tin Roof, Equinox Flower, Touch of Evil, The Hidden Fortress, The Long, Hot Summer, Elevator to the Gallows, Jalsaghar, Mon Oncle, Ashes and Diamonds, The Inn of the Sixth Happiness, The Brothers Karamazov, The Ballad of Narayama, The Magician, The Big Country, The Defiant Ones, Andy Hardy Comes Home, Gigi, Ivan the Terrible, Part Two, Lonelyhearts
- 1959 – The 400 Blows, Floating Weeds, Some Like It Hot, Hiroshima Mon Amour, North by Northwest, Ballad of a Soldier, Anatomy of a Murder, Rio Bravo, The Diary of Anne Frank, Pickpocket, Suddenly, Last Summer, Ben-Hur, The World of Apu, Nazarín, The Nun's Story, Pillow Talk, Imitation of Life
- 1960 – La Dolce Vita, Psycho, The Apartment, Breathless, Rocco and His Brothers, Inherit the Wind, L'Avventura, Peeping Tom, The Bad Sleep Well, Elmer Gantry, Two Women, Purple Noon, Spartacus, The Virgin Spring, Wild River, BUtterfield 8, Eyes Without a Face
- 1961 – Last Year at Marienbad, La Notte, Viridiana, Judgment at Nuremberg, Yojimbo, The Hustler, The Innocents, Splendor in the Grass, Breakfast at Tiffany's, West Side Story, Through a Glass Darkly, A Woman Is a Woman, Victim, The End of Summer, The Misfits, One, Two, Three, Divorce Italian Style, A Taste of Honey
- 1962 – Lawrence of Arabia, Jules and Jim, Vivre sa vie, To Kill a Mockingbird, L'Eclisse, Harakiri, Days of Wine and Roses, The Exterminating Angel, The Trial, Cape Fear, La Jetée, An Autumn Afternoon, The Manchurian Candidate, Sweet Bird of Youth, Ivan's Childhood, The Man Who Shot Liberty Valance
- 1963 – 8½, The Leopard, Hud, The Great Escape, The Birds, Winter Light, Charade, High and Low, Contempt, It's a Mad, Mad, Mad, Mad World, Muriel, Irma la Douce, The Haunting, Yesterday, Today and Tomorrow, Cleopatra
- 1964 – Dr. Strangelove, Zorba the Greek, Charulata, Mary Poppins, Red Desert, The Umbrellas of Cherbourg, The Gospel According to St. Matthew, Woman in the Dunes, I Am Cuba, The Americanization of Emily, Gertrud, Séance on a Wet Afternoon, Band of Outsiders, Hamlet, A Hard Day's Night, Diary of a Chambermaid, Before the Revolution, Kiss Me, Stupid, My Fair Lady, Marnie, A Fistful of Dollars, The Train, The Pawnbroker, Marriage Italian Style
- 1965 – The Sound of Music, Red Beard, Shadows of Forgotten Ancestors, The Shop on Main Street, Pierrot le Fou, Doctor Zhivago, Alphaville, Repulsion, Ship of Fools, Juliet of the Spirits, Le Bonheur, For a Few Dollars More, The Cincinnati Kid, The Sons of Katie Elder, The Spy Who Came In from the Cold
- 1966 – Au hasard Balthazar, The Battle of Algiers, Persona, Who's Afraid of Virginia Woolf?, Daisies, The Round-Up, The Good, the Bad and the Ugly, Andrei Rublev, Chimes at Midnight, Masculine-Feminine, The Chase, A Man for All Seasons, Born Free, Winnie the Pooh, Seconds, Fantastic Voyage, Blowup, Black Girl, El Dorado
- 1967 – Bonnie and Clyde, The Jungle Book, Belle de jour, Mouchette, The Graduate, War and Peace, Le samouraï, Marketa Lazarová, Playtime, In Cold Blood, In the Heat of the Night, Divorce American Style, Two for the Road, The Red and the White, Point Blank
- 1968 – 2001: A Space Odyssey, Once Upon a Time in the West, Hour of the Wolf, The Lion in Winter, La hora de los hornos (The Hour of the Furnaces), Night of the Living Dead, Memorias del Subdesarrollo (Memories of Underdevelopment), if...., Planet of the Apes, Faces
- 1969 – Butch Cassidy and the Sundance Kid, The Italian Job, Easy Rider, Hello, Dolly, Z, Army of Shadows, The Color of Pomegranates, The Wild Bunch, Midnight Cowboy, They Shoot Horses, Don't They?, Olimpiada en México, My Night at Maud's, True Grit, The Brothers Karamazov
- 1970 – Love Story, The Conformist, Performance, Patton, M*A*S*H, Beneath the Planet of the Apes, Woodstock, Tora! Tora! Tora!, Five Easy Pieces, Airport, Let It Be; first IMAX films
- 1971 – The French Connection, A Clockwork Orange, Willy Wonka & the Chocolate Factory, Dirty Harry, Get Carter, The Last Picture Show, Fiddler on the Roof, Harold and Maude, Escape from the Planet of the Apes, Straw Dogs
- 1972 – The Godfather, Aguirre, the Wrath of God, The Poseidon Adventure, Cries and Whispers, Those People of the Nile, Conquest of the Planet of the Apes, The Discreet Charm of the Bourgeoisie, Solaris, Last Tango in Paris, Cabaret, Napoleon and Samantha, Deep Throat, What's Up, Doc?, Sounder
- 1973 – The Exorcist, Enter the Dragon, Amarcord, The Sting, American Graffiti, Paper Moon, Mean Streets, Battle for the Planet of the Apes, The Wicker Man, Distant Thunder, Day for Night, Papillon
- 1974 – A Woman Under the Influence, Lenny, The Godfather Part II, Chinatown, Ali: Fear Eats the Soul, The Texas Chain Saw Massacre, Phantom of the Paradise, Young Frankenstein, Blazing Saddles, Benji, The Conversation, Black Christmas, The Towering Inferno
- 1975 – Jeanne Dielman, 23 quai du Commerce, 1080 Bruxelles, Mirror, One Flew Over the Cuckoo's Nest, Dog Day Afternoon, Barry Lyndon, Jaws, The Rocky Horror Picture Show, Monty Python and the Holy Grail, The Passenger, Salò, or the 120 Days of Sodom, Nashville

== 1976–2025 ==
- 1976 – Taxi Driver, The Killing of a Chinese Bookie, Rocky, Network, Carrie, All the President's Men, In the Realm of the Senses, 1900, Logan's Run
- 1977 – Star Wars, The Many Adventures of Winnie the Pooh, The Rescuers, Annie Hall, Opening Night, Saturday Night Fever, Close Encounters of the Third Kind, A Bridge Too Far, Eraserhead, Providence, Raggedy Ann & Andy: A Musical Adventure
- 1978 – Halloween, The Deer Hunter, Dawn of the Dead, Superman, Grease, Jaws 2, Midnight Express, Days of Heaven, Up in Smoke, National Lampoon's Animal House
- 1979 – Stalker, Apocalypse Now, Alien, Mad Max, Star Trek: The Motion Picture, The Muppet Movie, Kramer vs. Kramer, Monty Python's Life of Brian, Manhattan, The Black Stallion
- 1980 – The Empire Strikes Back, The Shining, Raging Bull, Airplane!, Caddyshack, Ordinary People, Kagemusha, Friday the 13th, The Blues Brothers, The Elephant Man, Private Benjamin
- 1981 – Raiders of the Lost Ark, Chariots of Fire, Reds, The Evil Dead, On Golden Pond, Pennies from Heaven, Das Boot, The Great Muppet Caper, Scanners, Time Bandits, Clash of the Titans, Escape from New York, An American Werewolf in London
- 1982 – E.T. the Extra-Terrestrial, Blade Runner, Poltergeist, The Thing, Tron, Sophie's Choice, Tootsie, The Secret of NIMH, Fanny and Alexander, Fitzcarraldo, Gandhi, Star Trek II: The Wrath of Khan, First Blood, 48 Hrs., The Dark Crystal, An Officer and a Gentleman
- 1983 – Return of the Jedi, Terms of Endearment, Risky Business, Sans Soleil, L'Argent, The King of Comedy, The Right Stuff, Strange Brew, Jaws 3-D, National Lampoon's Vacation, Scarface, Nostalghia, Trading Places, A Christmas Story
- 1984 – This Is Spinal Tap, Amadeus, The Terminator, Ghostbusters, The Karate Kid, Once Upon a Time in America, The Muppets Take Manhattan, Paris, Texas, Dune, Stop Making Sense, Gremlins, Footloose, Star Trek III: The Search for Spock, Beverly Hills Cop, Nausicaä of the Valley of the Wind, A Nightmare on Elm Street, The NeverEnding Story
- 1985 – Back to the Future, The Breakfast Club, Out of Africa, National Lampoon's European Vacation, The Color Purple, Brazil, Shoah, Ran, Come and See, The Goonies, Pee-wee's Big Adventure, A Room with a View
- 1986 – Top Gun, Crocodile Dundee, Blue Velvet, The Sacrifice, Ferris Bueller's Day Off, Aliens, Platoon, Ruthless People, Hannah and Her Sisters, Stand by Me, Short Circuit, The Fly, Labyrinth
- 1987 – Fatal Attraction, The Untouchables, The Princess Bride, Dirty Dancing, Full Metal Jacket, Wings of Desire, The Dead, RoboCop, Evil Dead II, The Last Emperor, Raising Arizona, Wall Street, Jaws: The Revenge, The Lost Boys, Hellraiser, Predator, Moonstruck, Hope and Glory, Planes, Trains and Automobiles, Lethal Weapon, Au revoir les enfants, Good Morning, Vietnam, Broadcast News
- 1988 – Rain Man, Cinema Paradiso, Who Framed Roger Rabbit, Die Hard, Beetlejuice, My Neighbor Totoro, Akira, The Accused, Big, Days of Terror, The Bear, The Last Temptation of Christ, Dead Ringers, Child's Play, The Naked Gun: From the Files of Police Squad!, A Fish Called Wanda
- 1989 – Do the Right Thing, Driving Miss Daisy, Batman, The Abyss, When Harry Met Sally..., The Little Mermaid, Say Anything..., National Lampoon's Christmas Vacation, Bill & Ted's Excellent Adventure, Crimes and Misdemeanors, Dead Poets Society, Field of Dreams, Born on the Fourth of July, Meteo; first publication of Empire, Back to the Future Part II
- 1990 – Home Alone, Ghost, Goodfellas, Close-Up, Dances With Wolves, The Godfather Part III, Edward Scissorhands, Wild at Heart, Total Recall, Meteo, Misery, Pretty Woman, Back to the Future Part III, Journey of Hope, The Hunt for Red October
- 1991 – The Silence of the Lambs, Terminator 2: Judgment Day, Beauty and the Beast, JFK, Boyz n the Hood, Thelma & Louise, A Brighter Summer Day, Barton Fink, The Addams Family
- 1992 – Unforgiven, Reservoir Dogs, Basic Instinct, Aladdin, A Few Good Men, The Player, The Crying Game, Wayne's World, Indochine, Candyman, A League of Their Own
- 1993 – Jurassic Park, Schindler's List, The Piano, Groundhog Day, In the Name of the Father, The Nightmare Before Christmas, Philadelphia, Three Colours trilogy, True Romance, Dazed and Confused
- 1994 – Forrest Gump, Pulp Fiction, The Shawshank Redemption, The Lion King, Legends of the Fall, Clerks, Sátántangó, Interview with the Vampire, Speed, True Lies, Léon: The Professional, Hoop Dreams, Il Postino: The Postman, The Mask, Four Weddings and a Funeral
- 1995 – Braveheart, Se7en, Cruel Jaws, Apollo 13, Toy Story, The Usual Suspects, Heat, 12 Monkeys, Dilwale Dulhania Le Jayenge, Clueless, Babe, Leaving Las Vegas, Casino, the Before trilogy, Sense and Sensibility
- 1996 – Independence Day, Twister, Fargo, Flirting with Disaster, Trainspotting, The English Patient, Jerry Maguire, Mission: Impossible, Scream, 101 Dalmatians, That Thing You Do!, Shine, Shall We Dance?; the first DVDs were released
- 1997 – Titanic, The Lost World: Jurassic Park, Life is Beautiful, Good Will Hunting, Air Force One, Boogie Nights, Jackie Brown, George of the Jungle, Hercules, Good Burger, L.A. Confidential, Gattaca, Hana-bi, Men in Black, Austin Powers: International Man of Mystery, The Full Monty, Princess Mononoke, Perfect Blue, The Fifth Element, I Know What You Did Last Summer, Mouse Hunt, As Good as It Gets, Buddy, Con Air
- 1998 – Saving Private Ryan, American History X, The Thin Red Line, A Bug's Life, Shakespeare in Love, The Big Lebowski, Rush Hour, Buffalo '66, Antz, The Truman Show, The Wedding Singer, The Rugrats Movie, Fear and Loathing in Las Vegas, Run Lola Run, Lock, Stock and Two Smoking Barrels, There's Something About Mary
- 1999 – Star Wars: Episode I – The Phantom Menace, American Beauty, The Sixth Sense, Entrapment, The Matrix, Fight Club, The Straight Story, Magnolia, Notting Hill, Drop Dead Gorgeous, The Mummy, South Park: Bigger, Longer & Uncut, The Blair Witch Project, The Iron Giant, The Green Mile, Tarzan, Toy Story 2, Election, Boys Don't Cry, Beau Travail, Being John Malkovich
- 2000 – How the Grinch Stole Christmas, Crouching Tiger, Hidden Dragon, In the Mood for Love, Gladiator, Cast Away, Scary Movie, Chicken Run, Platform, Memento, The Emperor's New Groove, Rugrats in Paris: The Movie, Erin Brockovich, Billy Elliot, Dungeons & Dragons, Almost Famous, The Road to El Dorado, O Brother, Where Art Thou?, High Fidelity, Battle Royale, The Adventures of Rocky and Bullwinkle, X-Men, Unbreakable, Final Destination, The Perfect Storm, 102 Dalmatians, American Psycho, Whatever It Takes, Requiem for a Dream; the first digital cinema in Europe by Phillippe Binant
- 2001 – The Lord of the Rings, Harry Potter, Shrek, A Beautiful Mind, The Royal Tenenbaums, Spirited Away, Mulholland Drive, Donnie Darko, The Fast and the Furious, Monsters, Inc., Jurassic Park III, Moulin Rouge!, Ocean's Eleven, Zoolander, Legally Blonde, Training Day, Black Hawk Down, Rush Hour 2, Monster's Ball, Amélie, Bridget Jones's Diary
- 2002 – Spider-Man, City of God, Minority Report, The Pianist, Like Mike, Star Wars: Episode II – Attack of the Clones, Chicago, 8 Mile, The Hours, The Quiet American, Gangs of New York, Bowling for Columbine, About a Boy, Frida, Lilo & Stitch, 28 Days Later, Bend It Like Beckham, My Big Fat Greek Wedding, Punch-Drunk Love, Ice Age, The Ring, Better Luck Tomorrow, Catch Me If You Can, Adaptation
- 2003 – Oldboy, Kill Bill, Lost in Translation, Elephant, Monster, Pirates of the Caribbean: The Curse of the Black Pearl, Looney Tunes: Back in Action, Finding Nemo, Love Actually, Elf, The Triplets of Belleville, Cold Mountain, The Room, School of Rock, Once Upon a Time in Mexico, The Matrix Reloaded, The Matrix Revolutions
- 2004 – Eternal Sunshine of the Spotless Mind, Million Dollar Baby, The Day After Tomorrow, The SpongeBob SquarePants Movie, The Incredibles, The Passion of the Christ, Sideways, Hotel Rwanda, Downfall, Friday Night Lights, Spider-Man 2, Saw, the Three Flavours Cornetto trilogy, Anchorman: The Legend of Ron Burgundy, Mean Girls, Napoleon Dynamite, The Polar Express; the anti-piracy campaign "Piracy. It's a crime", which features the first line You Wouldn't Steal a Car, is first advertised
- 2005 – Star Wars: Episode III – Revenge of the Sith, War of the Worlds, The New World, Brokeback Mountain, Madagascar, The Dark Knight trilogy, The Death of Mr. Lazarescu, A History of Violence, Pride & Prejudice, Walk the Line, Robots, Wallace & Gromit: The Curse of the Were-Rabbit, King Kong, March of the Penguins, Munich, Charlie and the Chocolate Factory, The 40-Year-Old Virgin, Good Night, and Good Luck, Zathura
- 2006 – Pirates of the Caribbean: Dead Man's Chest, Pan's Labyrinth, The Devil Wears Prada, Children of Men, 300, The Departed, Nacho Libre, Dreamgirls, The Lives of Others, The Prestige, Happy Feet, The Queen, Cars, Over the Hedge, Flushed Away, Borat, Little Miss Sunshine, The Pursuit of Happyness, Superman Returns, An Inconvenient Truth, Monster House, The Ant Bully, The Last King of Scotland, Babel, United 93; the first Blu-rays released
- 2007 – Pirates of the Caribbean: At World's End, Spider-Man 3, The Golden Compass, Transformers, Alvin and the Chipmunks, There Will Be Blood, No Country for Old Men, The Simpsons Movie, I Am Legend, Sweeney Todd: The Demon Barber of Fleet Street, Ratatouille, Into the Wild, Juno, Atonement, Superbad, Rush Hour 3, La Vie en Rose
- 2008 – Kung Fu Panda, WALL-E, The Incredible Hulk, Madagascar: Escape 2 Africa, Rambo, Slumdog Millionaire, Mamma Mia!, Gran Torino, Iron Man, The Wrestler, Milk, Vicky Cristina Barcelona, The Spiderwick Chronicles, Cloverfield, Waltz with Bashir, In Bruges, Man on Wire, The Curious Case of Benjamin Button
- 2009 – Avatar, Inglorious Basterds, Up, A Serious Man, District 9, The Hurt Locker, The Hangover, Coraline, Mary and Max, Precious, An Education, In the Loop
- 2010 – The King's Speech, Toy Story 3, Iron Man 2, Inception, Black Swan, The Social Network, How to Train Your Dragon, Despicable Me, Winter's Bone, Tangled, 127 Hours, Scott Pilgrim vs. the World, Last Kung Fu Monk
- 2011 – The Artist, Drive, Hugo, The Muppets, Cars 2, The Tree of Life, The Green Hornet, Pirates of the Caribbean: On Stranger Tides, Thor, Captain America: The First Avenger, The Girl with the Dragon Tattoo, Bridesmaids, Moneyball, Tinker Tailor Soldier Spy, The Help, The Cabin in the Woods
- 2012 – The Amazing Spider-Man, Life of Pi, Argo, Battleship, Lincoln, Madagascar 3: Europe's Most Wanted, Django Unchained, The Master, Silver Linings Playbook, Ted, The Hunger Games, Pitch Perfect, Magic Mike, Beasts of the Southern Wild, Zero Dark Thirty, The Avengers,The Hobbit, Wreck-it Ralph, Les Misérables, Snow White and the Huntsman
- 2013 – The Wolf of Wall Street, Despicable Me 2, Gravity, Frozen, Monsters University, 12 Years a Slave, American Hustle, Dallas Buyers Club, Inside Llewyn Davis, Iron Man 3, Thor: The Dark World, Her, The Conjuring, Pacific Rim, Blue is the Warmest Colour
- 2014 – Interstellar, Boyhood, The Amazing Spider-Man 2, The Grand Budapest Hotel, Birdman, Whiplash, Guardians of the Galaxy, Captain America: The Winter Soldier, Muppets Most Wanted, The Babadook, Paddington, The Lego Movie, John Wick, The Theory of Everything, Godzilla
- 2015 – Star Wars: The Force Awakens, Jurassic World, Minions, Mad Max: Fury Road, The Revenant, Inside Out, Cinderella, The Martian, Avengers: Age of Ultron, Ant-Man, Spotlight, Amy, San Andreas, Ex Machina
- 2016 – Rogue One: A Star Wars Story, Finding Dory, La La Land, Deadpool, Zootopia, Your Name, Captain America: Civil War, Doctor Strange, Moana, Manchester by the Sea, Moonlight, The Secret Life of Pets, Sing, Train to Busan, Don't Breathe
- 2017 – Star Wars: The Last Jedi, Beauty and the Beast, The Shape of Water, Wonder Woman, Spider-Man: Homecoming, Guardians of the Galaxy Vol. 2, Get Out, It, Dunkirk, Logan, Thor: Ragnarok, The Disaster Artist, Baby Driver, Paddington 2, Blade Runner 2049, Kong: Skull Island, The Silent Child, Despicable Me 3, Three Billboards Outside Ebbing, Missouri, Call Me by Your Name, Darkest Hour, The Greatest Showman; the Harvey Weinstein scandal began
- 2018 – Bohemian Rhapsody, Spider-Man: The Spider-Verse trilogy, Rampage, A Quiet Place, Ant-Man and the Wasp, Avengers: Infinity War, Black Panther, A Star Is Born, The Favorite, Jurassic World: Fallen Kingdom, Hereditary, Free Solo, The Grinch, Solo: A Star Wars Story
- 2019 – Joker, Toy Story 4, Captain Marvel, 1917, Parasite, Star Wars: The Rise of Skywalker, Avengers: Endgame, Rocketman, The Banana Splits Movie, Little Women, The Irishman, Marriage Story, Uncut Gems, Knives Out, Spider-Man: Far From Home, Godzilla: King of the Monsters
- 2020 — Nomadland, Sonic the Hedgehog, Minari, The Eight Hundred, Hamilton, Mank, The Invisible Man, Another Round, Promising Young Woman, Wolfwalkers, Ma Rainey's Black Bottom, The Half of It, Tenet, A Quiet Place Part II; due to the COVID-19 pandemic, a number of films shut down production or are removed from their originally scheduled releases and moved to new release dates or digital releases
- 2021 — Spider-Man: No Way Home, Dune, The Power of the Dog, Encanto, Judas and the Black Messiah,Shang-Chi and the Legend of the Ten Rings, Belfast, Licorice Pizza, Don't Look Up, Flee, Godzilla vs. Kong, CODA, The White Tiger, Black Widow, Tick, Tick... Boom!, Eternals, The Lost Daughter; American movie theatre chain AMC Theatres launches its movie theatre commercial starring actress Nicole Kidman
- 2022 – Everything Everywhere All at Once, Top Gun: Maverick, Guillermo del Toro's Pinocchio, RRR, Elvis, Aftersun, X, Doctor Strange in the Multiverse of Madness, Black Panther: Wakanda Forever, The Batman, Sonic the Hedgehog 2, Thor: Love and Thunder, The Banshees of Inisherin, All Quiet on the Western Front, Jurassic World Dominion, Marcel the Shell with Shoes On, Triangle of Sadness
- 2023 – Barbenheimer (consisting of the films Barbie and Oppenheimer), Wonka, The Marvels, Poor Things, The Zone of Interest, M3GAN, Guardians of the Galaxy Vol. 3, The Super Mario Bros. Movie, Maestro, The Boy and the Heron, May December, Plane, Robot Dreams, Are You There God? It's Me, Margaret., Ant-Man and the Wasp: Quantumania; in Hollywood, the Writers Guild of America and SAG-AFTRA separately began a series of strikes by the actors and writers for six months, affecting the film and television industries
- 2024 – Inside Out 2, Wicked, Twisters, Beetlejuice Beetlejuice, The Substance, Conclave, Civil War, Dune: Part Two, The Wild Robot, Sonic the Hedgehog 3, Despicable Me 4, Flow, Godzilla X Kong: The New Empire, Better Man, Challengers, A Real Pain, Anora, The Brutalist, Deadpool & Wolverine, Subversion
- 2025 – Zootopia 2, A Minecraft Movie, Wolf Man, Dog Man, Wicked: For Good, Captain America: Brave New World, Snow White, The Alto Knights, How to Train Your Dragon, Thunderbolts*, Elio, Lilo & Stitch, Jurassic World Rebirth, Avatar: Fire and Ash, Back in Action, Now You See Me 3, The Fantastic Four: First Steps, It Was Just an Accident, Superman, Resurrection, Predator: Badlands, The Gorge, The Monkey, Gabby's Dollhouse: The Movie, Heart Eyes, Five Nights at Freddy's 2, Dark Nuns, One Battle After Another, Sinners

== 2026–present ==
- 2026 – Mutiny, Scream 7, Toy Story 5, The Mandalorian and Grogu, The Bride!, Project Hail Mary, Wuthering Heights, Send Help, Masters of the Universe, Buddy, Supergirl, The End of Oak Street, Goat, Good Luck, Have Fun, Don't Die, Mercy, The Sheep Detectives, 28 Years Later: The Bone Temple, The Odyssey, Avengers: Doomsday, Obsession, Backrooms, Spider-Man: Brand New Day, Coyote vs. Acme

== See also ==
- List of cinematic firsts
