= Ernst Mehlich =

German-Brazilian conductor and composer

Ernst Mehlich (February 9, 1888 - February 12, 1977) was a German-Brazilian orchestra conductor and composer. In Brazil he was known as Ernesto Mehlich.

== Biography ==
Mehlich was born in Berlin, Germany.

In January 1927 he became director of the Baden-Baden City Symphony Orchestra, first as head of the City Musical Department, and from December on as general music director. In Baden-Baden he inaugurated the Deutsche Kammermusikfestival (German Chamber Music Festival) in July 1927, in which Paul Hindemith, Carl Friedberg, and Igor Stravinsky participated.

Besides, the Mahagonny-Songspiel, commissioned for the festival, premiered on July 17. The Kammermusikfestival was discontinued after the scandal caused by the premiere of Hindemith and Brecht's Lehrstück in 1929.

In January 1930 he went on a tour through the United States, where he conducted performances of Richard Wagner's Tristan und Isolde and Der fliegende Holländer at the Philadelphia Metropolitan Opera House.

In 1933 he was dismissed from his post by the new Nazi government because of his Jewish ancestry. He emigrated to Brazil, where he became the first musical director of the São Paulo City Symphony Orchestra. On March 28, 1936, he conducted the inaugural concert. Later he conducted the Orchestra of the Professional Musicians' Union of São Paulo.

Mehlich died in São Paulo, Brazil, where there is a street named after him, rua Maestro Ernesto Mehlich.

== Works ==
- Canção da Palavra (for Soprano and Piano, lyrics by Francisco Carvalho)
- op. 14: Magnificat
