= Man Walking Around a Corner =

1887 film by Louis Le Prince

- The entire film animated
- Directed by: Louis Le Prince
- Produced by: Louis Le Prince
- Starring: An unknown man
- Cinematography: Louis Le Prince
- Release date: December 12, 1887
- Running time: 2 seconds
- Country: United Kingdom
- Language: Silent

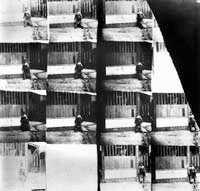
Man Walking Around a Corner

Man Walking Around a Corner is an early film/precursor of film, shot by Louis Le Prince in August 1887. It was taken on the corner of Rue Bochart-de-Saron and Avenue Trudaine in the 9th arrondissement of Paris. Pictures from the film were sent in a letter dated 18 August 1887 to his wife. According to David Wilkinson's 2015 documentary The First Film indeed, the work is not a film, but a series of photographs, 16 in total, each taken from one of the 16 lenses from Le Prince's camera. Le Prince went on to develop the one-lens camera, and on 14 October 1888 he finally made the world's first moving image. The total result of the work lasts less than two seconds.

== See also ==
- 1887 in film
- Brighton School (filmmaking)
