= Filippo Filippi =

Italian music critic (1830–1887)

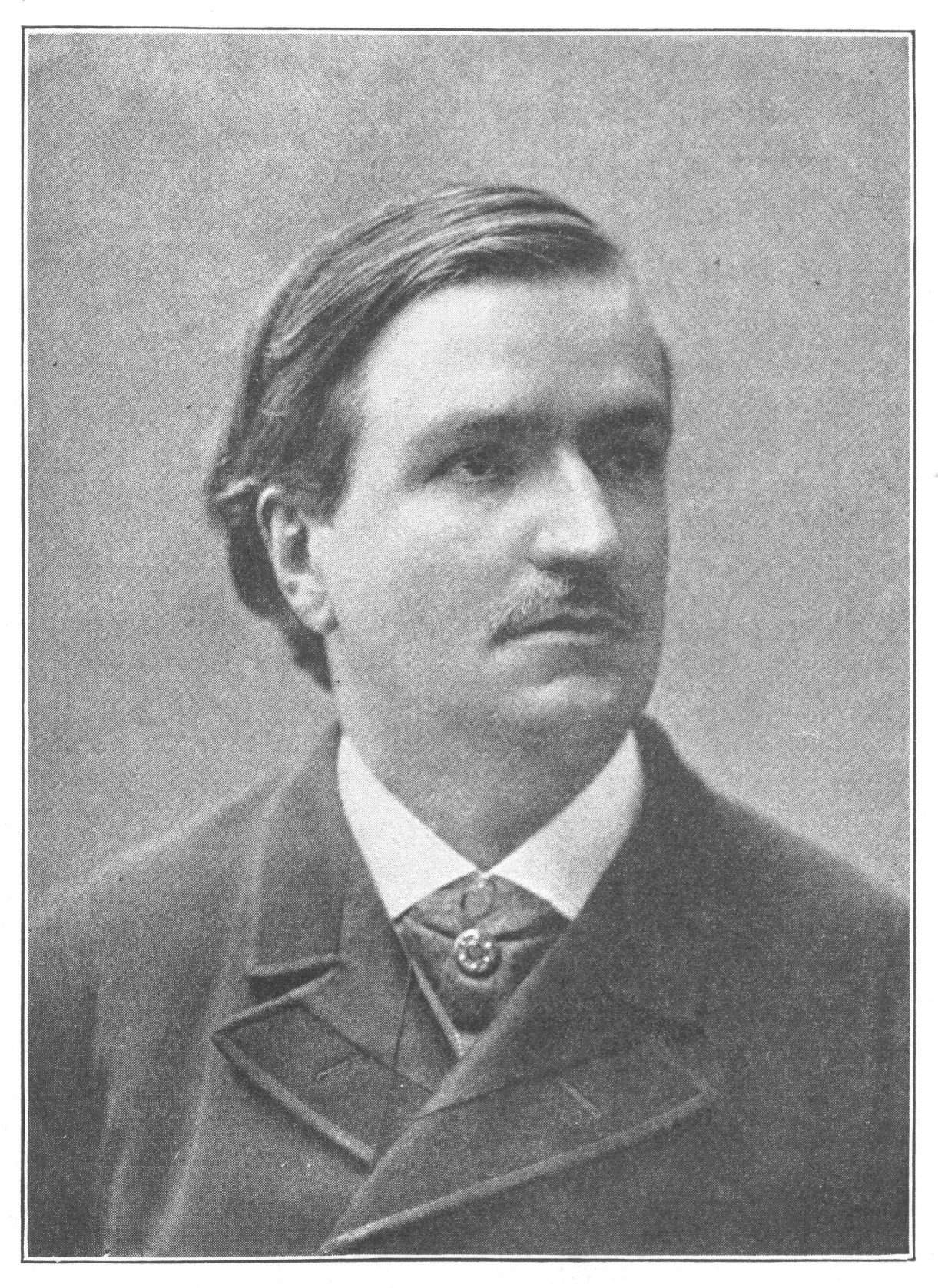

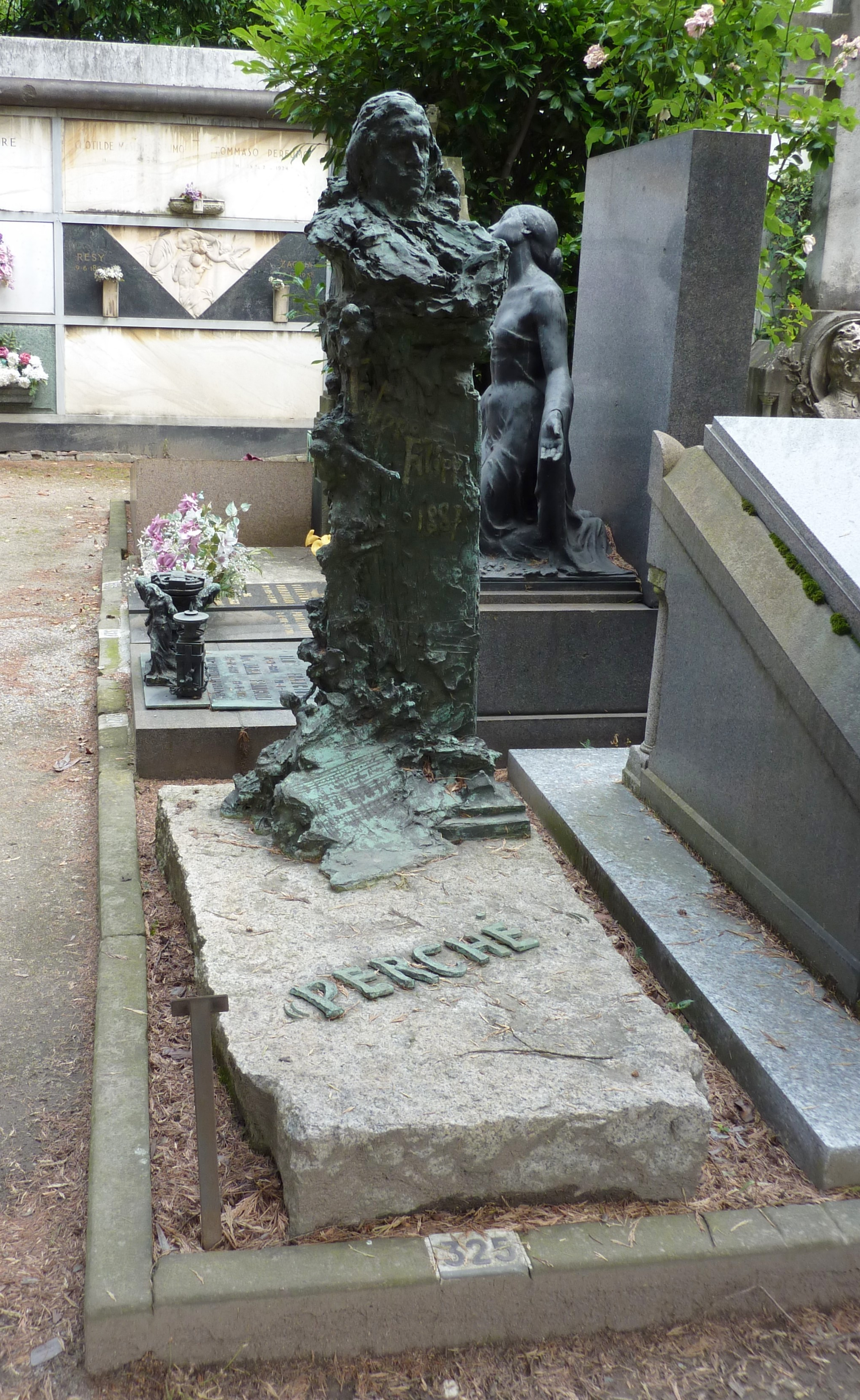
Filippi's grave at the Monumental Cemetery of Milan, Italy

Filippo Filippi (13 January 1830 – 24 June 1887) was an Italian music critic. He wrote for the Milanese music magazine La perseveranza, and was an admirer of and a frequent correspondent with Giuseppe Verdi.

He was born in Vicenza, and received an early training as a musician there, studying piano and organ. After acquiring a law degree in Padua he decided instead to embark on a career of music criticism, propelled by his love for the music of Verdi and a need to defend it against the criticism it was receiving from some quarters. In 1859 he was employed by the Gazzetta musicale di Milano as assistant editor, but soon became editor, a position he held until 1862, at which time he became a critic for La perseveranza, a position he held for the rest of his life. He traveled to Cairo for the première of Aida, on 24 December 1871.

Verdi was warm in his relations with Filippi, but resisted some of Filippi's suggestions to adopt some of the stylistic innovations of the Germans, especially Wagner.

Filippi also wrote an autobiography as well as some works of music scholarship, including studies of Alessandro Stradella and Adolfo Fumagalli. In 1876 he published a collection of all the articles he had written for La perseveranza, under the title Musica e musicisti: critiche, biografie ed escursioni.

== References and further reading ==
- Pinzauti, Leonardo (1980). "Filippo Filippi". In Sadie, Stanley (ed.). The New Grove Dictionary of Music and Musicians. Vol. vi (1st ed.). London: Macmillan. p. 546.
- Roger Parker. "Giuseppe Verdi", Grove Music Online, ed. L. Macy (accessed February 15, 2005), grovemusic.com (subscription access).
- Filippo Filippi, Della vita e delle opere di Adolfo Fumagalli, Ricordi, 1857.
- Filippo Filippi, Musica e musicisti: critiche, biografie ed escursioni, G. Brigola, 1876.
