= Max Wolf (composer) =

Austrian composer

Maximilian Wolf (28 March 1840 – 23 March 1886) was a Moravian composer. He was born in Hranice, Moravia on 28 March 1840. He wrote three operas, Die Pilger (1872), Die Porträt-Dame (1877), and Césarine (1878), all of which premiered in Vienna.
