= George H. Diamond =

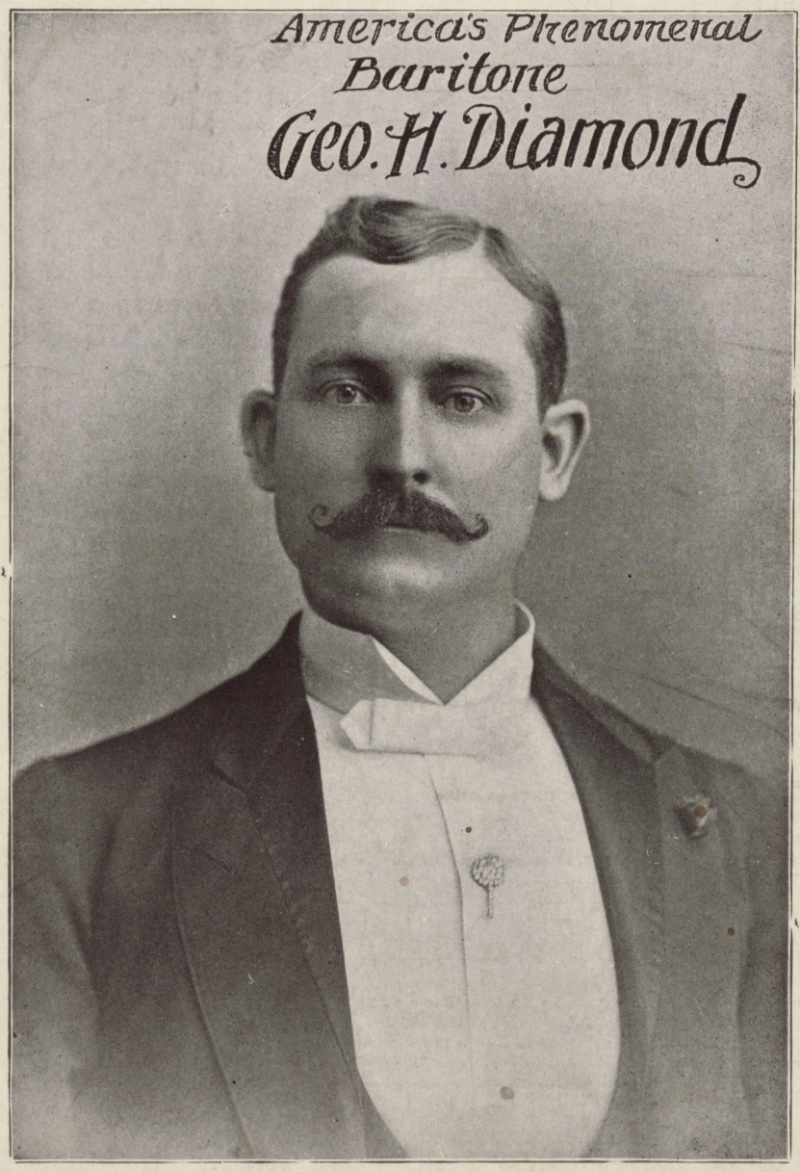

Background information
- Born: 1862; Buffalo, New York, US
- Died: 1922 (aged 59–60) Lebanon, Pennsylvania, US
- Occupations: Singer, songwriter, publisher
- Years active: 1888-1913

George H. Diamond (1862–1922) was an American entertainer, songwriter, and recording artist popular in the 1890s and 1900s.

== Biography ==
George H. Diamond was born in Buffalo, New York in 1862 to John and Catherine Diamond. He began performing in variety shows in early 1888. In 1889 he was advertised as a famous contortionist. Beginning around 1890 Diamond toured the nation as a singer of popular tin pan alley songs on the vaudeville circuit. In 1892 he began recording for the New Jersey Phonograph Company. In 1893 he recorded for the Columbia Phonograph Company and North American Phonograph Company. His repertoire was divided into sentimental songs like "My Sweetheart's the Man in the Moon" and comic songs like "I Wish They'd Do it Now". His prominence in these catalogs suggests he was already famous as a performer. At this point in the recording industry, however, duplication was relatively crude so successful recording artists were required to frequently return to the studios to resupply stock. Diamond returned to touring and seems to have stopped recording in late 1893.

Diamond continued to find success as a singer, and toured with Bryant and Watson’s Burlesquers, the "Utopians", and the Imperial Burlesques among others. His performances often included "illustrated songs" in which an assistant would project topical slides, and later motion pictures, in time with Diamond's singing. Between 1898 and 1906 Diamond was frequently pictured on sheet music covers (usually as Geo. H. Diamond). In early 1910 Diamond retired from performance and opened a music publishing business in New York, publishing his own and others' compositions. His "There's a Mother Old and Gray who Needs me Now" was a moderate success.

In 1914 Diamond married Emma R. Penn, a native of Lebanon, Pennsylvania, and moved there to live with her. He became ill in 1920 and died in Lebanon in 1922. He is buried in the Mount Lebanon Cemetery.

== Compositions ==
- "Alice, Still Will I Love Thee" (Lyricist - 1909)
- "You're Just the Same Sweet Girl" (1909)
- "When Your Little Shoes and My Big Boots Are Under the Bed Together" (1910)
- "There's a Mother Old and Gray who Needs me Now" (1911)
- "Mutt and Jeff March and Two-step" (1912)
- "The Little Red Caboose Behind the Train" (1912)
- "You'll Never Miss Your Mother 'Till She's Gone" (1912)
- "'Till I Met You I Never Knew of Love Sweet Love" (Lyricist - 1913)
