= Leisurely Pedestrians, Open Topped Buses and Hansom Cabs with Trotting Horses =

- Directed by: William Friese-Greene
- Release date: 1889
- Running time: 20 feet
- Country: United Kingdom
- Language: Silent

Leisurely Pedestrians, Open Topped Buses and Hansom Cabs with Trotting Horses (also known as Hyde Park Corner) is an 1889 British short silent actuality film, shot by inventor and film pioneer William Friese-Greene. The film depicts life at Hyde Park Corner in London. Hyde Park Corner is claimed to be the first film set in London, as well as the first to be filmed on celluloid, although Louis Le Prince successfully shot on glass plate before 18 August 1887, and on paper negative in October 1888. It may nonetheless be the first moving picture film on celluloid and the first shot in London. It was shown mainly to several photographic journalists who saw it during their lifetime—including Thomas Bedding, J. Hay Taylor and Theodore Brown. It is now considered a lost film with only 6 possible frames surviving today.

== Background ==
In 1888, photographer William Friese-Greene began experimenting with celluloid. Prior to that, photographic materials often utilized glass plates. While paper with photographic chemicals was used, these proved unpopular compared to glass plates. However, celluloid, which had existed since the 1850s, began to receive traction upon the invention of flexible film, and was beginning to be viewed as an alternative to glass plates. Friese-Greene's experiments led to him inventing and patenting the chronophotographic camera in 1889. The camera utilized celluloid film, and with it could take ten photographs per second.

Friese-Greene's experiments led him to take several photographs of Apsley Gate's surroundings near Hyde Park Corner, which were used for the film. Exactly when he took the photographs is disputed; The Royal Parks and Stuff About London claimed he did so in January 1889. However, Science Museum Group states he took the photographs in October that same year. Regardless, the film was completed in 1889, and was first shown to a public audience at Chester Town Hall in July 1890. While the film is not the first to ever be made, with Louis Le Prince's Roundhay Garden Scene being recorded in 1888, it is claimed to be the first celluloid film in existence as well as presenting the first moving pictures in London.

Ultimately, Hyde Park Corner was not positively received in 1890. Since flickering imagery can only be perceived by the human brain as one fluid moving frame from about 16 frames per second, the low 10 frames per second of the chronophotographic camera were deemed to be the cause of the underwhelming audience reaction. Additionally, some film historians dispute the time frame of the film's recording, claiming that these projections could not have been possible during this time period.

== Survival ==
Hyde Park Corner is now considered a lost film. Some people have shown of what they claim to be Leisurely Pedestrians, Open Topped Buses and Hansom Cabs with Trotting Horses, but ultimately these are the 1896 film Piccadilly Circus.

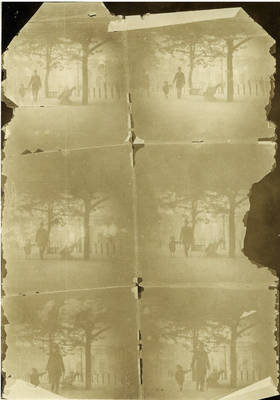
Unidentified frames from the Jonathan Silent Film Collection

Some film frames attributed to Friese-Green resurfaced as part of the Jonathan Silent Film Collection. Six photos depict a man and a child walking in Hyde Park, with what appears to be Marble Arch in the background.

== See also ==
- The Magic Box
