= Carlo Giorgio Garofalo =

Italian composer, conductor and organist

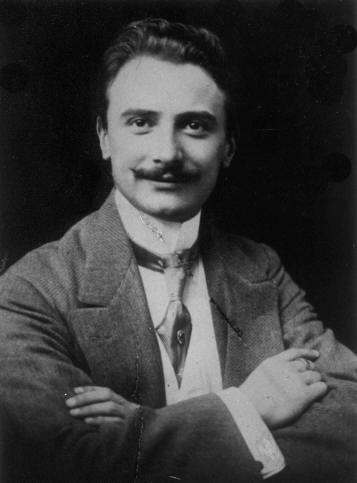

Carlo Giorgio Garofalo (5 August 1886 – 6 April 1962) was an Italian composer, conductor and organist.

Garofalo was born in Rome, Italy to Giovanni and Faustina Rinaldi Garofalo. He later attended the Vatican college, where he studied organ and music composition. Garofalo followed classmate Pietro Yon to the United States, where he, with the assistance of Yon, found employment as music director and organist at the Immaculate Conception Church in Boston.

A biography of Carlo Giorgio Garofalo can be found at belcantopera.angelfire.com.
