= 1890 in philosophy =

1890 in philosophy saw the publication of several books influencing modern philosophy.

== Publications ==
- William Morris, News from Nowhere
- William James, The Principles of Psychology, which was vastly influential on Ludwig Wittgenstein's philosophy
- Alfred Marshall, Principles of Economics
- James George Frazer, The Golden Bough, which was combined anthropology with philosophy to form modernism

== Births ==
- August 20 - H. P. Lovecraft (died 1937)

== Deaths ==
- March 26 - African Spir (born 1837)
