= 1886 in music =

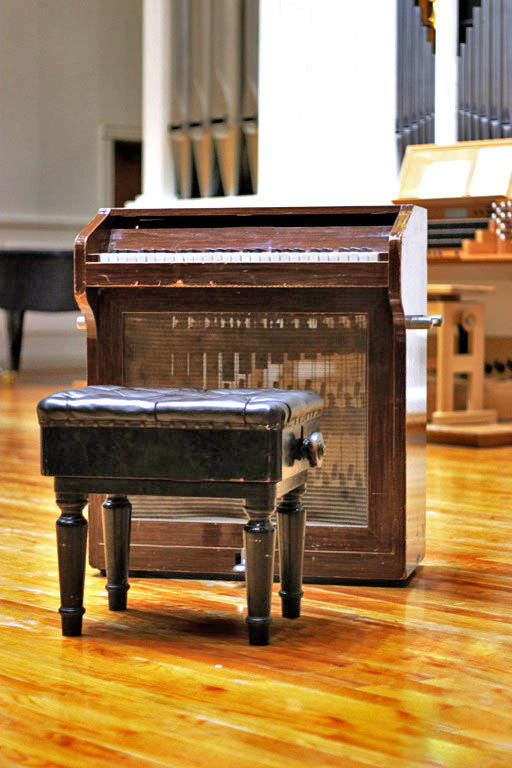
Celesta invented.

== Specific locations ==
- 1886 in Norwegian music

== Events ==
- March 21 – Anton Bruckner's Symphony No. 7 is performed for the first time publicly in Vienna, conducted by Hans Richter. This is his breakthrough work.
- May 1 – The final version of Tchaikovsky's overture-fantasy Romeo and Juliet is performed for the first time, in Tbilisi (at this time part of the Russian Empire) under Mikhail Ippolitov-Ivanov.
- June 9
  - Soprano Adelina Patti marries tenor Ernesto Nicolini in South Wales.
  - The centennial of the Stoughton Musical Society is celebrated in the United States.
- June 25 – Arturo Toscanini makes his conducting debut, with an Italian opera company visiting Rio de Janeiro.
- July 19 – Franz Liszt plays his last concert, in Luxembourg, dying less than two weeks later.
- September 9 – Eight countries adopt the Berne Convention for the Protection of Literary and Artistic Works, an historic international agreement on copyright protection which comes into force on 5 December 1887; other countries follow suit.
- December 1 – Anton Seidl conducts the first American staging of Tristan und Isolde at the Metropolitan Opera in New York City.
- The celesta is invented by Auguste Mustel.
- M. Witmark & Sons are established as popular music publishers in New York City.

== Published popular music ==
- "The Gladiator" m. John Philip Sousa
- "Johnny Get Your Gun" w.m. Monroe H. Rosenfeld
- "Semper Fidelis" m. John Philip Sousa
- "Somebody's Mother" (The Song of All Mother Songs) by James W. Wheeler
- "Two Lovely Black Eyes, Oh, What a Surprise" w. Charles Coborn m. Edmund Forman

== Classical music ==
- Eugen d'Albert – Symphony op. 4 in F
- Anton Arensky – Margarite Gautier, Fantasia for Orchestra, op. 9
- Johannes Brahms – Cello Sonata No. 2 op. 99 in F, Violin Sonata No. 2 op. 100 in A, Piano Trio No. 3 op. 101 in C minor
- Charles Bordes – Paysages Tristes (song cycle)
- George Whitefield Chadwick – Symphony No. 2 op. 21 in B-flat (revision)
- Felix Draeseke – String Quartet No. 2 op. 35 in E minor, Piano Concerto op. 36 in E-flat, Symphony No. 3 in C major Tragica
- Gabriel Fauré – Piano Quartet No. 2 op. 45 in G minor
- Arthur Foote – In the Mountains (tone poem)
- César Franck – Sonata for Violin and Piano in A Major
- Alexander Glazunov – Five Novelettes for String Quartet, Op. 15, Symphony No. 2, Op. 16 (To the Memory of Liszt)
- Vincent d'Indy – Symphonie sur un chant montagnard français
- Hans Pfitzner – String Quartet in D minor
- Josef Rheinberger – String Quartet No. 2, Op. 147 in F
- Camille Saint-Saëns – The Carnival of the Animals, Symphony No. 3 (Organ)
- Charles Villiers Stanford – Piano Quintet op. 25 in D minor
- Ludwig Thuille – Symphony
- Emil Waldteufel – España
- Charles-Marie Widor – Symphony No. 2, Op. 54
- John Philip Sousa – "The Gladiator" March
- Richard Strauss – Aus Italien
- Bernard Zweers – Symphony No. 3

== Opera ==
- Edmond Audran - La cigale et la fourmi
- Alfredo Catalani – Edmea
- Alfred Cellier - The Carp, Dorothy
- Emmanuel Chabrier - Gwendoline
- Ferenc Erkel - István király
- Edward German - The Rival Poets
- Karl Goldmark - Merlin
- Théodore Gouvy - Électre
- Modest Mussorgsky - Khovanshchina
- Émile Paladilhe - Patrie!
- Felipe Pérez y González - La Gran Vía
- Spyros Samaras - Flora mirabilis
- Charles Lecocq - Plutus
- Edward Solomon - Pepita; or, the Girl with the Glass Eyes

== Musical theater ==
- Adonis, London production opened at the Gaiety Theatre on May 31 and ran for 110 performances.
- Dorothy, London production opened at the Gaiety Theatre on September 25. It transferred to the Prince of Wales Theatre on December 20 and to the Lyric Theatre on December 17, 1888, for a record-setting total run of 931 performances.
- Erminie, Broadway production of this British show opened at the Casino Theatre on May 10 and ran for 571 performances.
- The Queen of Hearts (music by John Philip Sousa), Broadway production.

== Births ==
- January 9 – Lloyd Loar, American sound engineer and instrument designer (d. 1943)
- January 22 – John J. Becker, American composer and editor (of Charles Ives' music) (d. 1961)
- January 25 – Wilhelm Furtwängler, conductor (d. 1954)
- March 3 – R. O. Morris, British composer, teacher of Michael Tippett among others (d. 1948)
- April 26 – Ma Rainey, blues singer (d. 1939)
- April 30 – Frank Merrick, British pianist and composer (d. 1981)
- May 3 – Marcel Dupré, French composer and organist (d. 1971)
- May 4 – Shelton Brooks, Canadian-African American-song composer (d. 1975)
- May 13 – Joseph Achron, Lithuanian Jewish composer (d. 1943)
- May 24 – Paul Paray, conductor and composer (d. 1979)
- May 26 – Al Jolson, singer and actor (d. 1950)
- May 28 – Nikolai Sokoloff, Russian-American conductor and violinist (d. 1965)
- June 9 – Kosaku Yamada, Japanese composer and conductor (d. 1965)
- June 12 – E. Ray Goetz, US songwriter (d. 1954)
- June 13 – Art Hickman, US bandleader (d. 1930)
- July 4 – Heinrich Kaminski, German composer (d. 1946)
- August 5 – Carlo Giorgio Garofalo, Italian composer and organist (d. 1962)
- August 8 – Pietro Yon, Italian composer and organist, emigrated to US (d. 1943)
- August 19 – Robert Heger, German composer and conductor (d. 1978)
- August 27
  - Rebecca Clarke, English composer and violist (d. 1979)
  - Eric Coates, English composer and conductor (d. 1957)
- August 31 – L. Wolfe Gilbert, Russian-born US songwriter (d. 1970)
- September 1 – Othmar Schoeck, Swiss composer (d. 1957)
- September 11 – Launy Grøndahl, Danish composer and conductor (d. 1960)
- September 25 – Jesús Guridi, composer (d. 1961)
- October 1 – Ali-Naqi Vaziri, composer (d. 1979)
- October 6 – Edwin Fischer, pianist and conductor (d. 1960)
- November 6 – Gus Kahn, German-born US lyric writer (d. 1941)
- December 25 – Kid Ory, jazz musician (d. 1973)

== Deaths ==
- January 16
  - Joseph Maas, operatic tenor (b. 1847)
  - Amilcare Ponchielli, opera composer (b. 1834)
- February 16 – Louis Köhler, conductor, composer and piano teacher (b. 1820)
- March 23 – Max Wolff, composer (b. 1840)
- March 27 – Dobri Chintulov, poet, teacher and composer (b. 1822)
- March 31
  - Marie Heilbron, operatic soprano (b. c. 1851)
  - Giovanni Rossi, composer, conductor, organist, and conservatory director (b. 1828)
- April 13 – Károly Thern, pianist, conductor and composer (b. 1817)
- July 23 – Emil Scaria, operatic bass-baritone (b. 1838)
- July 31 – Franz Liszt, pianist and composer (b. 1811)
- August 17 – John Woodcock Graves, composer (b. 1795)
- September 10 – John Liptrot Hatton, composer (b. 1809)
- September 14 – Hubert Ries, violinist and composer (b. 1802)
- October 15 – Vilhelm Christian Holm, composer (b. 1820)
- November 20 – Róza Laborfalvi, actress and singer (b. 1817)
- date unknown
  - Sonya Adler, actress and singer (complications following childbirth)
  - Heraclio Fernández, composer and journalist (b. 1851)
