= 1885 in music =

Events in the year 1885 in music.

== Specific locations ==
- 1885 in Norwegian music

== Events ==
- October 25 – Johannes Brahms' Symphony No. 4 is premiered in Meiningen
- Tin Pan Alley group of popular songwriters and publishers' forms in New York City

== Published popular music ==
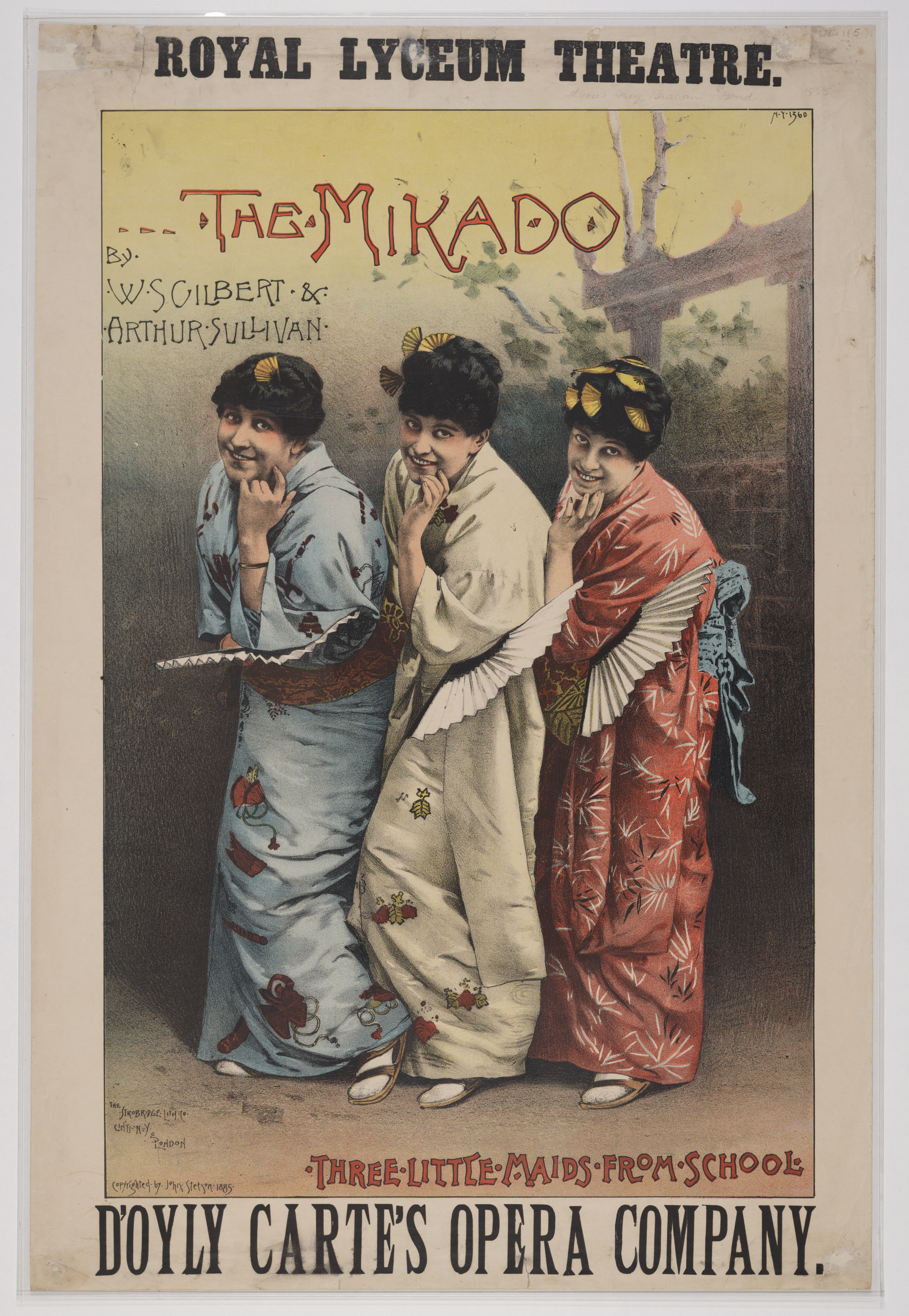
"Three Little Maids from School" from Gilbert & Sullivan's "The Mikado"

- "American Patrol" m. F. W. Meacham
- "The Boy I Love is Up in the Gallery" w.m. George Ware
- "Dars a Lock on de Chicken Coop Door" by Sam Lucas
- "Funny Things They Do Upon The Sly" w. G. W. Hunter & John Cooke Jnr m. G. W. Hunter
- "Open Road" Johann Strauss II
- "Raise me, Jesus, to thy bosom," w. by George Birdseye, m. by William A. Huntley
- "Saffi's Aria" Johann Strauss II
- "Some Sweet Day" by Edward L. Park & William Howard Doane
- "This Is The House That Jerry Built" w. T. S. Lonsdale m. W. G. Eaton
- "What Cheer 'Ria" w. Will Herbert m. Bessie Bellwood
- From the score of The Mikado:
  - "A More Humane Mikado" ("Let the Punishment fit the Crime")
  - "The Flowers That Bloom In The Spring"
  - "There Is Beauty In The Bellow Of The Blast"
  - "Three Little Maids From School"
  - "A Wand'ring Minstrel I"

== Classical music ==
- Johannes Brahms – Symphony No. 4, Op. 98, in E minor
- George Whitefield Chadwick – String Quartet No. 3 in D
- Antonín Dvořák – Symphony No. 7, Op. 70, in D minor
- Cesar Franck
  - Symphonic Variations for piano and orchestra
  - Danse lente for piano
- Alexander Glazunov – Stenka Razin
- Charles Gounod – Mors et vita (oratorio)
- Franz Liszt - Bagatelle sans tonalité
- Giuseppe Martucci - Piano Concerto No. 2, Op. 66 (1884-5)
- Camille Saint-Saëns – Violin Sonata No. 1
- Jean Sibelius – String Quartet in E-flat major
- Richard Strauss
  - Piano Quartet in C minor, Op. 13
  - Concerto No. 1 in E-flat Major for horn and orchestra
- Pyotr Ilyich Tchaikovsky – Manfred Symphony
- José Vianna da Motta – Piano Concerto in A

== Opera ==
- Emmanuel Chabrier – Gwendoline
- Fromental Halévy, completed by Georges Bizet – Noé given its first performance at Karlsruhe.
- Jules Massenet – Le Cid
- André Messager
  - La fauvette du temple
  - La Béarnaise
- Emile Pessard – Tabarin premiered on January 12 at the Théâtre de l'Opéra, Paris
- Amilcare Ponchielli – Marion Delorme
- George Stephanescu – Scaiul barbatilor

== Musical theater ==
- Edward Jakobowski – Erminie (libretto by Claxson Bellamy and Harry Paulton) London production
- William S. Gilbert and Arthur Sullivan – The Mikado London production
- Johann Strauss II – Der Zigeunerbaron (The Gypsy Baron) Vienna production

== Births ==
- January 13 – James V. Monaco, Italian-born US composer (d. 1945)
- January 27 – Jerome Kern, composer and songwriter (d. 1945)
- February 9 – Alban Berg, composer (d. 1935)
- February 12 – James Scott, ragtime composer (d. 1938)
- February 16 – Will Fyffe, Scottish comedian and singer (d. 1947)
- March 15 – Bertha Raffetto, American singer (d. 1952)
- May 5 – Agustín Barrios, composer (d. 1944)
- May 14 – Otto Klemperer, conductor and composer (d. 1973)
- May 30 – Erna Ellmenreich, German operatic soprano (d. 1976)
- June 13 – John Palm, Curaçao-born composer (d. 1925)
- June 28 – Marino Capicchioni, Italian musical instrument maker (d. 1977)
- July 12 – George Butterworth, composer (d. 1916)
- July 17 – Benjamin Dale, composer (d. 1943)
- August 9 – Pietro Frosini, accordionist (d. 1951)
- October 15 – Therese Wiet, Austrian operetta singer (d. 1971)
- October 21 – Egon Wellesz, Austrian composer (d. 1974)
- October 25 – Sam M. Lewis, American lyricist (d. 1959)
- November 28 – Rabbit Brown, American country blues musician (d. 1928)
- December 19 – Joe "King" Oliver, American jazz musician (d. 1938)

== Deaths ==
- February 15 – Leopold Damrosch, conductor, 52 (complications from a cold)
- March 31 – Franz Abt, composer, 65
- April 24 – Henry Augustus Rawes, hymn-writer, 58
- May – Adolphe Blanc, composer, 56
- May 1 – Henry Brinley Richards, composer, 67
- May 12 – Ferdinand Hiller, German composer, conductor and pianist, 73
- June 20 – Giuseppe Mazza, composer, conductor, and organist, 79
- June 29 – Samuel C. Upham, lyricist, 66
- August 26 – August Gottfried Ritter, organist and composer, 74
- September 11 – Julius Zarebski, Polish pianist and composer, 31
- September 13 – Friedrich Kiel, German composer, 63
- October 21 – Michele Novaro, songwriter, 66
