= 1870s in film =

The decade of the 1870s in film involved some significant events.

== Events ==
- 1874 – French astronomer Pierre Janssen used his Janssen revolver to photograph the transit of the planet Venus across the Sun, a sequence of photographs that could be considered as the oldest film; that he called "Passage de Vénus"
- 1877 – French inventor Charles-Émile Reynaud improved on the Zoetrope idea by placing mirrors at the center of the drum. He called his invention the Praxinoscope. Reynaud developed other versions of the Praxinoscope, too, including a Praxinoscope Theatre (where the device was enclosed in a viewing box) and the Projecting Praxinoscope. Eventually he created the "Théâtre Optique", a large machine based on the Praxinoscope, able to project longer animated strips. In the United States, the McLoughlin Bros. from New York released in 1879 a simplified (and unauthorized) copy of Reynaud's invention under the name "Whirligig of Life".
- 1877–1878 – Thomas Edison's announcement of his phonograph invention inspired Scientific American to suggest combinations with stereoscopic photographs and projection. Wordsworth Donisthorpe replied that his Kinesigraph (patented in 1876) would soon produce moving life-size photographs with the motion of lips and gestures corresponding to the words from the phonograph.
- 1878 – Eadweard Muybridge records his famous chronophotographic series of pictures of the phases of The Horse in Motion, the result of an assignment by railroad tycoon Leland Stanford who wanted to see proof of the real positions of the horse's gait. The pictures had a huge impact, because the recorded positions were very different (and often less gracious) than most people imagined; many drawings and paintings turned out to be incorrect.

== Births ==
Year	Month	Date	Name	Country	Profession	Died
1870	March	13	Henri Étiévant	France	Actor, Director	1953
1870	May	2	Lewis J. Selznick	US	Producer	1933
1871	March	23	Heinrich Schroth	Germany	Actor	1945
1871	April	16	Henry Stephenson	US	Actor	1956
1871	April	21	Jaro Fürth	Austria	Actor	1945
1871	May	30	Olga Engl	Austria	Actress	1946
1871	July	7	Richard Carle	US	Actor, Playwright	1941
1872	January	25	Robert McWade	US	Actor	1938
1872	February	12	Oscar Stribolt	Denmark	Actor	1927
1872	April	26	William Desmond Taylor	Ireland	Actor, Director	1922
1872	December	22	Georg Blomstedt	Sweden	Actor	1933
1873	January	7	Adolph Zukor	US	Founder of Paramount Pictures	1976
1873	March	7	Madame Sul-Te-Wan	US	Actress	1959
1873	June	10	Vera Lewis	US	Actress	1956
1873	June	13	Karin Swanström	Sweden	Actress, Director	1942
1873	July	1	Alice Guy-Blaché	France	Director, Producer, Screenwriter	1968
1873	November	24	John St. Polis	US	Actor	1946
1874	March	19	Arthur Hoyt	US	Actor	1953
1874	April	28	Sidney Toler	US	Actor, Writer	1947
1874	June	2	E. Alyn Warren	US	Actor	1940
1874	November	13	Henry Kolker	US	Actor, Director	1947
1874	November	22	Elizabeth Patterson	US	Actor	1966
1874	November	30	Lloyd Ingraham	US	Actor, Director	1956
1875	January	15	Claude King	UK	Actor	1941
1875	January	22	D. W. Griffith	US	Filmmaker	1948
1875	February	26	Emma Dunn	UK	Actress	1966
1875	March	25	Spencer Charters	US	Actor	1943
1875	April	4	Samuel S. Hinds	US	Actor, Lawyer	1948
1875	June	6	J. Farrell MacDonald	US	Actor, Director	1952
1875	June	11	Gilbert Emery	US	Actor	1945
1875	September	12	Matsunosuke Onoe	Japan	Actor	1926
1875	November	10	Maude Eburne	Canada	Actress	1960
1875	December	8	Frederik Buch	Denmark	Actor	1925
1876	February	26	Amy Veness	UK	Actress	1960
1876	March	18	Frank Darien	US	Actor	1955
1876	June	20	Romuald Joubé	France	Actor	1949
1877	June	19	Charles Coburn	US	Actor	1961
1877	November	8	Robert Homans	US	Actor	1947
1878	January	16	Harry Carey	US	Actor	1947
1878	April	12	Lionel Barrymore	US	Actor	1954
1878	May	25	Bill Robinson	US	Actor, Dancer	1949
1878	June	26	Ernest Torrence	Scotland	Actor	1933
1878	July	14	Donald Meek	Scotland	Actor	1946
1879	January	1	William Fox	Hungary	Founder of Fox Film Corporation	1952
1879	January	1	Paul Porcasi	Italy	Actor	1946
1879	February	12	Urban Gad	Denmark	Director	1947
1879	June	9	Dudley Digges	US	Actor	1947
1879	August	15	Ethel Barrymore	US	Actress	1959
1879	October	15	Jane Darwell	US	Actress	1967
1879	October	22	Karl Hoblitzelle	US	Movie theater owner	1967
1879	November	4	Will Rogers	US	Actor, Comedian	1935
1879	November	15	Lewis Stone	US	Actor	1953
1879	December	27	Sydney Greenstreet	UK	Actor	1954
1879	December	27	Robert Greig	Australia	Actor	1958

== See also ==
- Film
- History of film
- Lists of films
- 1870s in music
