= 1888 in music =

This is a list of notable events in music that took place in the year 1888.

== Specific locations ==
- 1888 in Norwegian music

== Events ==
- January 5 – The Neues Deutsches Theater, Prague, is inaugurated with a performance of Wagner's opera Die Meistersinger von Nürnberg.
- April 11 – The Concertgebouw in Amsterdam is inaugurated.
- June 29 – G. F. Handel's Israel in Egypt is recorded onto wax cylinder at The Crystal Palace in London, the earliest known recording of classical music.
- August 14 – A recording of Arthur Sullivan's "The Lost Chord" is played during a press conference introducing Thomas Edison's phonograph in London.
- October 5 – At the age of seven, George Enescu becomes the youngest student ever admitted to the Vienna Conservatory
- Gustav Mahler completes a projected symphonic poem, Totenfeier (Funeral Rites). It will eventually become the opening movement of his Symphony No. 2.

== Published popular music ==
- "Drill, Ye Tarriers, Drill" anonymous possibly Thomas F. Casey
- "Over The Waves" ("Sobre las Olas") w.m. Juventino Rosas
- "Where Did You Get That Hat?" w.m. Joseph J. Sullivan

== Classical music ==
- Johannes Brahms – Violin Sonata in D Minor (opus 108)
- Cécile Chaminade – Scarf Dance, Callirhoe (ballet)
- Claude Debussy - Arabesque No. 1, L. 66 for piano
- Frederick Delius – Hiawatha (tone poem)
- Gabriel Fauré – Requiem in D minor, Op. 48
- César Franck
  - Symphony in D Minor
  - Psyché, a symphonic poem with choir (based on the Greek myth), premiere March 10 1888
- Edvard Grieg
  - Lyric Pieces for Piano, Book IV
  - Peer Gynt Suite No. 1 Op. 46
- Augusta Holmes – La Nuit et l'amour
- Edwin Lemare
  - Andantino in D-flat, also known as Moonlight and Roses, Op. 83 No. 2
- Gustav Mahler –
  - Symphony No. 1
  - Lieder aus "Des Knaben Wunderhorn" (song collection)
- Carl Nielsen – Suite for String Orchestra
- Ignacy Jan Paderewski – Piano Concerto in A minor
- Max Reger – String Quartet in D minor (with double bass obbligato; without op.) (1888–9)
- Joseph Rheinberger – Organ Sonata No. 12 in D-flat, Op. 154
- Nikolai Rimsky-Korsakov –
  - Sheherazade
  - Russian Easter Festival Overture
- Erik Satie – Gymnopédie for piano
- Richard Strauss
  - Don Juan, Macbeth and Death and Transfiguration (first version)
- Pyotr Ilyich Tchaikovsky
  - Symphony No. 5
- Hugo Wolf
  - Goethe-Lieder
  - Mörike-Lieder

== Opera ==
- Karel Miry – La Napolitaine (opera in 1 act, libretto by J. de Bruyne), premiered on February 25 in Antwerp
- Emile Pessard – Tartarin sur les Alpes premiered on November 17 at the Théâtre de la Gaîté, Paris
- Camille Saint-Saëns – Ascanio
- Carl Maria von Weber, completed by Gustav Mahler – Die Drei Pintos
- Arthur Sullivan – The Yeomen of the Guard, October 3 Savoy Theatre, London

== Births ==
- January 20 – Huddie William Ledbetter (Lead Belly), American folk and blues singer (d. 1949)
- January 26 – Lisa Steier, Swedish ballerina (d. 1928)
- February 9 – Ernst Mehlich, German-Brazilian conductor and composer (d. 1977)
- February 27 – Lotte Lehmann, singer (d. 1976)
- May 10 – Max Steiner, composer (d. 1971)
- May 11 – Irving Berlin, composer (d. 1989)
- May 27 – Louis Durey, composer, member of Les Six (d. 1979)
- June 3 – Tom Brown, jazz trombonist (d. 1958)
- June 6 – Pete Wendling, American composer, pianist, and piano roll recording artist (d. 1974)
- June 16 – Bobby Clark, American comedian and singer (d. 1960)
- June 17 – Bernhard van den Sigtenhorst Meyer, Dutch composer (d. 1953)
- June 25 – Rosalie Housman, American composer (d. 1949)
- August 16 – Armand J. Piron, jazz musician (d. 1943)
- September 12 – Maurice Chevalier, French singer and actor (d. 1972)
- October 7 – Cecil Coles, composer (d. 1918)
- November 16 – Luis Cluzeau Mortet, Uruguayan composer (d. 1957)
- November 23 – Harpo Marx, American comedian, film star, mime artist and musician (d. 1964)
- November 26 – Francisco Canaro, Uruguayan-born Argentine violinist, composer (d. 1964)
- December 28 – Gabriel von Wayditch, American composer of operas (d. 1969)

== Deaths ==
- January 5 – Henri Herz, pianist and composer, 84
- January 14 – Stephen Heller, pianist and composer, 74
- February 7 – Aurore von Haxthausen, pianist and composer
- February 22 – Jean-Delphin Alard, violinist and music teacher, 72
- March 10 – Ciro Pinsuti, pianist and composer, 58
- March 21 – Thomas German Reed, composer and theatre manager, 72
- March 29 – Charles-Valentin Alkan, French pianist and composer, 74 (killed in freak accident, trapped beneath a falling coat-rack)
- April 21 – Julius Weissenborn, bassoonist, 51
- June 13 – Timoteo Pasini, Italian composer, conductor, and pianist, 59
- August 8 – Friedrich Wilhelm Jähns, composer, music teacher and cataloguer, 79
- August 31 – Blanche Cole, operatic soprano, 37 (dropsy)
- November 17 – Jakob Dont, violinist and composer, 73
- December 2 – Franz Xaver Witt, church musician and composer, 54
- December 26 – Alfred Vance, English music hall singer and comedian, 49 (died on stage)
