= 1887 in music =

== Specific locations ==
- 1887 in Norwegian music

== Events ==
25 May – A fire during the 745th performance there of Mignon largely destroys the second Salle Favart, home of the Opéra-Comique in Paris; 84 people are recorded dead.

== Published popular music ==
- "Angels Without Wings" w.m. George Dance
- "Away In A Manger" w. anon m. James Ramsey Murray
- "Calvary" w. Henry Vaughn m. Paul Rodney
- "Comrades" Felix McGlennon & George Horncastle
- "The Song That Reached My Heart" w.m. Julian Jordan
- "Ti! Hi! Tiddelly Hi!", w.m. Joseph Tabrar
- From the score of Ruddigore (Music: Arthur Sullivan Lyrics: W. S. Gilbert):
  - "I Know A Youth Who Loves A Maid"
  - "I Shipped, D'Ye See, In A Revenue Sloop"
  - "My Boy, You May Take It From Me"
  - "There Grew A Little Flower"
  - "When The Night Wind Howls"

== Classical music ==
- Isaac Albéniz
  - Sonatas Nos. 3, 4 and 5 for piano
  - Concierto fantástico in A minor
- Johannes Brahms – Concerto for Violin, Cello and Orchestra, Op. 102
- Anton Bruckner – Symphony No. 8
- Ruperto Chapi – La Bruja (zarzuela)
- Gustave Charpentier – Didon (cantata)
- Felix Draeseke – Sonata for Clarinet (or Violin) and Piano in B♭, Op. 38
- Antonín Dvořák
  - Piano Quintet No. 2 in A, Op. 81
  - Mass in D major, Op. 86
- Gabriel Fauré
  - 2 Songs, Op. 46
  - Pavane in F-sharp minor, Op. 50
- Robert Fuchs – Symphony No. 2 in E♭, Op. 45
- Edvard Grieg – Third Sonata for Violin and Piano in C minor, opus 45
- Asger Hamerik – Requiem
- Sergei Lyapunov – Symphony No. 1 in B minor, Op. 12
- José Vianna da Motta – Piano Concerto in A major
- Hans Pfitzner – Scherzo in C minor
- Josef Rheinberger
  - Organ Sonata No. 11 in D minor, op. 148
  - Suite for organ, violin and cello, op. 149
- Nikolai Rimsky-Korsakov - Capriccio Espagnol, Op. 34
- Camille Saint-Saëns
  - Caprice sur des airs danois et russes, Op. 79
  - Souvenir d'Italie, Op. 80
  - Feuillet d'album, Op. 81
  - Pas redoublé, Op. 86
- Alexander Scriabin – Étude in C-sharp minor, No. 1 from Trois morceaux, Op. 2
- Charles Villiers Stanford – An Irish Symphony (Symphony No. 3 in F minor), Op. 28
- Richard Strauss – Violin Sonata in E♭, Op. 18
- Hugo Wolf – Italian Serenade for string quartet

== Opera ==
- Aleksandr Borodin – Prince Igor (finished by Rimsky-Korsakov)
- Emmanuel Chabrier – Le roi malgré lui
- Charles Edouard Lefebvre – Zaïre premiered in Lille
- Adolf Neuendorff – Prince Waldmeister
- Camille Saint-Saëns – Proserpine
- Johann Strauss II – Simplicius
- Peter Tchaikovsky - The Enchantress
- Giuseppe Verdi – Otello

== Musical theater ==
- Dorothy Broadway production opened at the Standard Theatre on November 5 and transferred to the Grand Opera House on April 16, 1888, for a total run of 51 performances
- Ruddigore London and Broadway productions

== Births ==
- January 28 – Arthur Rubinstein, pianist (died 1982)
- February 3 – Georg Trakl, poet and lyricist (died 1914)
- February 7 – Eubie Blake, jazz pianist and composer (died 1983)
- February 23 – Oskar Lindberg, composer (died 1955)
- March 3 – Hart Wand, composer, fiddler, bandleader (died 1960)
- March 4 – Violet MacMillan, Broadway and silent movie actress (died 1953)
- March 5 – Heitor Villa-Lobos, Brazilian composer (died 1959)
- March 7 – Heino Eller, composer (died 1970)
- March 22 – Chico Marx, piano-playing comedian (died 1961)
- March 23 – Anthony van Hoboken, musicologist (died 1983)
- March 25 – Nicolae Bretan, opera composer (died 1968)
- March 31 – José María Usandizaga, opera and symphonic composer (died 1915)
- April 9 – Florence Price, composer (died 1953)
- April 10 – Heinz Tiessen, composer (died 1971)
- May 12 – Bertha Lewis, operatic contralto (died 1931)
- May 30 – Emil Reesen, Danish composer, conductor, and pianist (d. 1964)
- June 25 – George Abbott, US librettist and director (died 1995)
- July 2 – Marcel Tabuteau, oboist (died 1966)
- July 29 – Sigmund Romberg, composer (died 1951)
- August 25 – Fartein Valen, composer (died 1952)
- September 14 – Paul Kochanski, violinist (died 1934)
- September 15 – Ernest Whitfield, 1st Baron Kenswood, violinist and welfare worker (died 1963)
- September 16 – Nadia Boulanger, composer, conductor and music teacher (died 1979)
- September 19 – Rosita Marstini, dancer and film actress (died 1948)
- October 6 – Maria Jeritza, operatic soprano (died 1982)
- October 11 – Oscar Shaw, actor and singer (died 1967)
- October 14 – Ernest Pingoud, composer (died 1942)
- November 1 – Max Trapp, composer (died 1971)
- December 6 – Joseph Lamb, ragtime composer (died 1960)
- December 7 – Ernst Toch, composer (died 1964)
- December 8 – Vicente Emilio Sojo, musicologist and composer (died 1974)
- December 12 – Kurt Atterberg, composer (died 1974)
- December 24 – Lucrezia Bori, operatic soprano (died 1960)
- December 27
  - Gertie Gitana, music hall singer (died 1957)
  - Bernard van Dieren, composer (died 1936)
- date unknown
  - David Beigelman, violinist (died 1945; in Auschwitz concentration camp)
  - Carlo Jachino, composer (died 1971)

== Deaths ==
- January 19 – Nelly Power, music hall performer (born 1854)
- January 30 – Frederick Lablache, singer (born 1815)
- February 7 – Hanna Brooman, composer, translator and educator (born 1809)
- February 21 – James Lorraine Geddes, songwriter (born 1827
- February 27 – Alexander Borodin, composer (born 1833)
- March 2 – Wilhelm Troszel, operatic bass and composer (born 1823)
- March 24 – Justin Holland, classical guitarist and civil rights activist (born 1819)
- April 23 – John Ceiriog Hughes, lyricist and collector of folk tunes (born 1832)
- May 12 – Francesco Malipiero, composer (born 1824)
- May 23 – Ludvig Mathias Lindeman, composer (born 1812)
- June 1 – Joseph Philip Knight, composer (born 1812)
- June 24 – Filippo Filippi, music critic (born 1830)
- July 17 – Louis Mérante, dancer and choreographer (born 1828)
- August 15 – Hedvig Willman, opera singer (born 1841)
- August 16 – Alice May, singer and actress (born 1847; "congestion of the brain")
- October 1 – Robert Stoepel, conductor and composer (born 1821)
- October 18 – Matteo Salvi, opera composer (born 1816)
- October 31 – George Alexander Macfarren, composer (born 1813)
- November 2 – Jenny Lind, singer, "the Swedish Nightingale" (born 1820)
- November 18 – Eduard Marxsen, pianist and composer (born 1806)
- December 2 – Thomas Philander Ryder, composer, organist, teacher, conductor, and organ builder (born 1836)
- December 5 – Eliza R. Snow, lyricist (born 1804)
- date unknown – Georg Unger, operatic tenor (born 1837)
