= 1885 in film =

The following is an overview of the events of 1885 in film, including a list of notable births.

== Events ==
- American inventors George Eastman and Hannibal Goodwin each invent a sensitized celluloid base roll photographic film to replace the glass plates then in use.

== Births ==
Month	Date	Name	Country	Profession	Died
January	1	Béla Balogh	Hungary	Director	1945
January	6	Florence Turner	US	Actress	1946
January	11	Jack Hoxie	US	Actor	1965
January	28	Julia Cæsar	Sweden	Actress	1971
February	21	Sacha Guitry	France	Actor, director, screenwriter	1957
March	1	Lionel Atwill	UK	Actor	1946
April	1	Wallace Beery	US	Actor	1949
April	3	Allan Dwan	Canada	Director, screenwriter	1981
May	2	Hedda Hopper	US	Actress, Columnist	1966
May	7	George "Gabby" Hayes	US	Actor	1969
May	8	Charles Dullin	France	Actor, director	1949
May	21	Oscar A. C. Lund	Sweden	Actor, screenwriter, director	1963
June	26	Antonie Nedošinská	Czechia	Actress	1950
July	15	Tom Kennedy	US	Actor	1965
July	21	Jacques Feyder	Belgium	Actor, screenwriter, director	1948
July	29	Theda Bara	UK	Actress	1955
July	31	Luigi Serventi	Italy	Actor	1976
September	22	Erich von Stroheim	Austria	Actor, Filmmaker	1957
October	10	Jean Peyrière	France	Actor	1965
October	18	Amleto Novelli	Italy	Actor	1924
October	20	Purnell Pratt	US	Actor	1941
November	27	Daniel Mendaille	France	Actor	1963
December	11	Carlo Wieth	Denmark	Actor	1943
