= 1893 in film =

The following is an overview of the events of 1893 in film, including a list of films released and notable births.

== Events ==
- Thomas Edison builds America's First Movie Studio, the Black Maria.
- Blacksmith Scene is made and presented by Thomas Edison.
- First major public movie show, World's Columbian Exposition.

== Films released in 1893 ==
Blacksmith Scene.

- Blacksmith Scene, directed by William K. L. Dickson.
- Horse Shoeing, a documentary short film starring and directed by William K. L. Dickson.

== Births ==
Month	Date	Name	Country	Profession	Died
January	15	Ivor Novello	UK	Actor, Composer	1951
February	10	Jimmy Durante	US	Actor, Singer	1980
March	7	Elsa Ratassepp	Estonia	Actress	1972
March	29	Astrid Holm	Denmark	Actress	1961
April	3	Leslie Howard	UK	Actor	1943
April	12	Robert Harron	US	Actor	1920
April	20	Harold Lloyd	US	Actor	1971
May	8	Lester Dorr	US	Actor	1980
May	14	Jack Rice	US	Actor	1968
May	15	José Nepomuceno	Philippines	Director	1959
June	10	Hattie McDaniel	US	Actress, Singer-Songwriter, Comedian	1952
June	14	Suzanne Grandais	France	Actress	1920
July	6	Lech Owron	Poland	Actor	1965
August	3	Vicente Salumbides	Philippines	Actor, Director	1979
August	14	Carl Benton Reid	US	Actor	1973
August	17	Mae West	US	Actress	1980
30	Vera Kholodnaya	Russia	Actress	1919
September	6	Irving Bacon	US	Actor	1965
September	16	Alexander Korda	Hungary	Director, founder of London Films	1956
October	14	Lillian Gish	US	Actress	1993
November	19	Chris-Pin Martin	US	Actor	1953
December	7	Fay Bainter	US	Actress	1968
December	12	Edward G. Robinson	Romania	Actor	1973
December	24	Harry Warren	US	Film Songwriter	1981
December	29	Berthold Bartosch	Bohemia	Filmmaker	1968
