= 1887 in film =

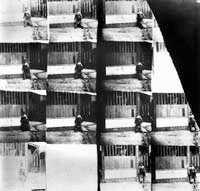
Man Walking Around a Corner, unremastered film, original frames copy by National Science Museum, London c. 1931. (Courtesy NMPFT, Bradford)

The year 1887 in film involved some significant events.

== Events ==
- Hannibal Goodwin files for a patent for his photographic film.
- Louis Le Prince's 16-lens camera (LPCC Type-16) is made in the United States and the film Man Walking Around a Corner is filmed using it this year.
- August – Harvey Henderson Wilcox registers his 120-acre ranch with the Los Angeles County Recorder's office, calling the area it is based in, Hollywood, which would later become the home of the U.S. film industry.

== Films ==
- Man Walking Around a Corner, directed by Louis Le Prince. The oldest known film.

== Births ==
Month	Date	Name	Country	Profession	Died
January	11	Monte Blue	US	Actor	1963
January	13	Gabriel Gabrio	France	Actor	1946
January	13	Sophie Tucker	France	Actress, Singer	1966
January	21	André Andrejew	Russia	Set Designer	1967
February	16	Kathleen Clifford	US	Actress	1962
February	26	William Frawley	US	Actor	1966
March	18	Frank Moran	US	Boxer, Actor	1967
March	21	Frank Urson	US	Director, Cinematographer	1928
March	24	Roscoe Arbuckle	US	Actor, Comedian	1933
April	9	Konrad Tom	Poland	Actor, screenwriter, director	1957
April	12	Harold Lockwood	US	Actor	1918
April	23	Jenő Törzs	Hungary	Actor	1946
May	1	Kurt Vespermann	Germany	Actor	1957
May	18	Jeanie MacPherson	US	Actress, screenwriter	1946
May	21	Mabel Taliaferro	US	Actress	1979
May	30	Paulette Noizeux	France	Actress	1971
June	1	Clive Brook	UK	Actor	1974
June	16	Aage Bendixen	Denmark	Actor	1973
July	17	Jack Conway	US	Director, producer	1952
August	1	Anthony Coldeway	US	Screenwriter	1963
August	5	Reginald Owen	UK	Actor	1972
August	10	Sam Warner	US	Film Mogul	1927
August	14	Marija Leiko	Latvia	Actress	1937
September	5	Irene Fenwick	US	Actress	1936
September	9	Raymond Walburn	US	Actor	1969
September	26	Antonio Moreno	Spain	Actor	1967
September	30	Lil Dagover	Germany	Actress	1980
October	5	Manny Ziener	Germany	Actress	1972
October	7	Jack Mulhall	US	Actor	1979
November	9	Gertrude Astor	US	Actress	1977
November	11	Maurice Elvey	UK	Director, producer	1967
November	11	Roland Young	UK	Actor	1953
November	23	Boris Karloff	UK	Actor	1969
November	30	Gyula Szőreghy	Hungary	Actor	1943
December	9	Tim Moore	US	Actor	1958
December	23	John Cromwell	US	Actor, producer, director	1979
December	29	Pierre Watkin	US	Actor	1960
