= John Robinson Whitley =

Entrepreneur (b. 1843, d. 1922)

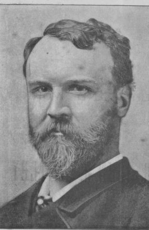
- John Robinson Whitley
- Born: John Robinson Whitley; 13 December 1843; Leeds, Yorkshire, England
- Died: 22 March 1922 (aged 78); Condette, France
- Occupations: Founder of Earl's Court Exhibition Grounds, creator of 4 national fairs, developer of Le Touquet-Paris-Plage, founder of Hardelot-Plage, philanthropist
- Years active: 1867–1922
- Spouse: Ellen Naylor (m. 1871–1922)
- Children: 4

John Robinson Whitley (13 December 1843, Leeds – 22 March 1922, Condette, France) was a British entrepreneur who inaugurated the Earl's Court Exhibition Grounds in West London in 1887. After four major exhibitions on the site (1887–1892), he moved to France where in partnership with Allen Stoneham, he developed Touquet-Paris-Plage and created Hardelot-Plage. He was a brother-in-law of pioneering French cinematographer, Louis Aimé Augustin Le Prince and grandfather of Air marshal Sir John Whitley.

== Background ==
John Whitley was the eldest son of Leeds iron and bronze foundry owner, Joseph Whitley and his wife, Sarah née Robinson. Joseph Whitley, originally from Wakefield, was steeped in metallurgy and moved to Leeds where in 1844 he opened his own business, J.Whitley & Co., subsequently J.Whitley Partners, which he headed until his death in 1891. He was an innovator and inventor, holder of over 50 patents. Joseph and Sarah Whitley were the parents-in-law of French pioneer cinematographer, Louis Le Prince, who, in 1888 'filmed' them along with other family members in what was probably the first ever experimental motion picture, at their home in Roundhay. See The First Film.

Whitley probably attended Leeds Grammar School: the name is mentioned on the register, without an initial, around 1856. Later his parents sent him to Germany to learn German, then on to Blois in France to master French and finally to Siena, Italy to learn Italian. On completing his education, he carried on with foreign travel to acquaint himself with industrial developments abroad. His tours included return visits to France, Germany and Italy and forays into Switzerland, Austria-Hungary, Russia, Turkey, the Netherlands, Belgium, Spain and Portugal. Further excursions were to continental Africa, the United States and South America.

Fluent in four languages and a graduate of several European universities, he joined his father's business in Leeds and was commissioned to expand it into Europe and the USA. From 1873 he was a member of the Institute of Mechanical Engineers.

Whitley was made a Mason at Philanthropic Lodge No. 304 in 1866 at the Masonic Hall on Great George Street, Leeds.

== Career in England ==
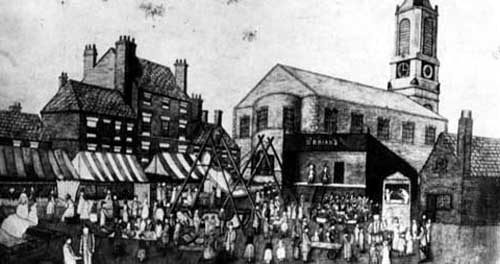
Hunslet Feast as Whitley may have witnessed

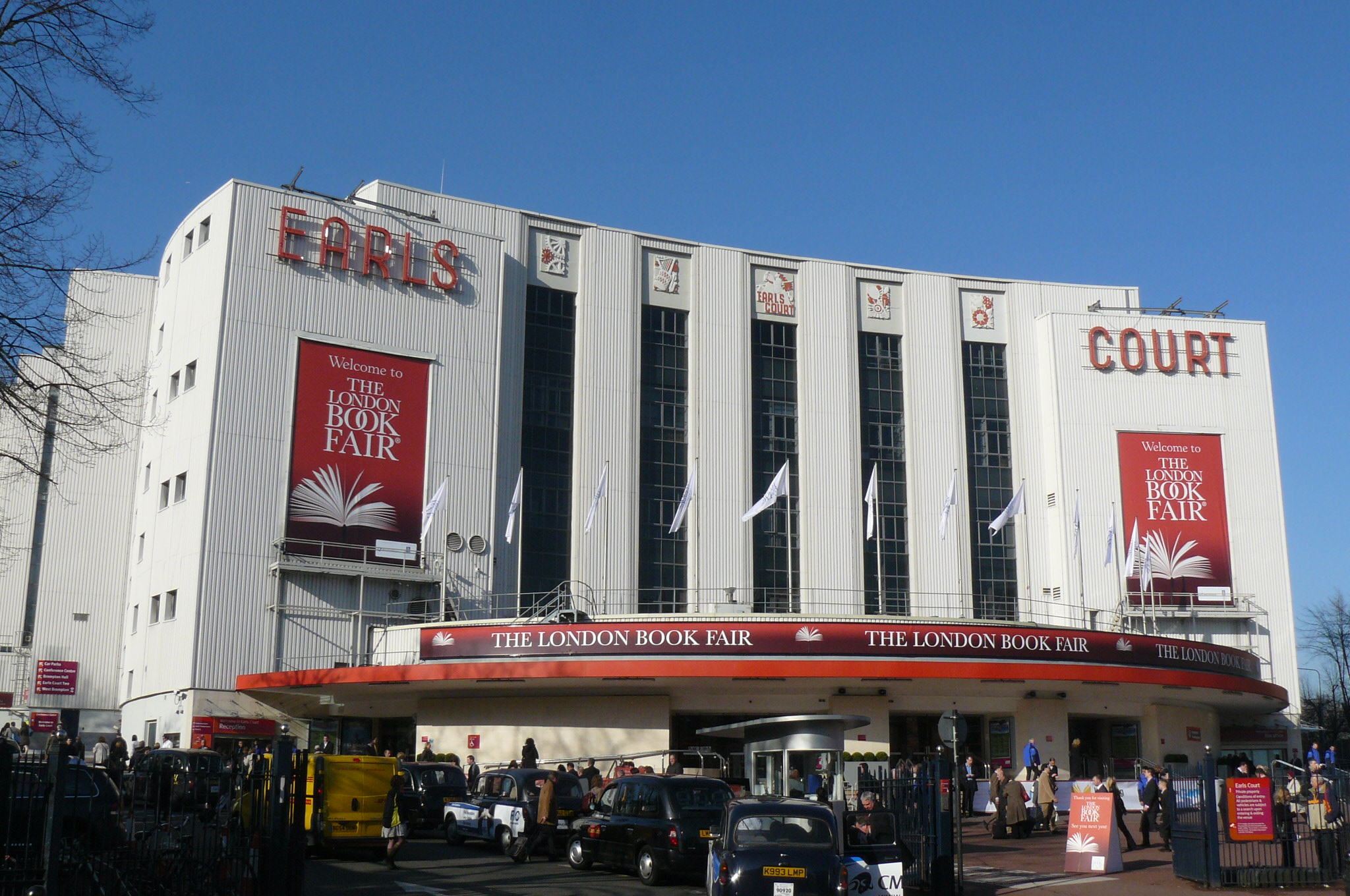
Earls Court as it became in the 20th century

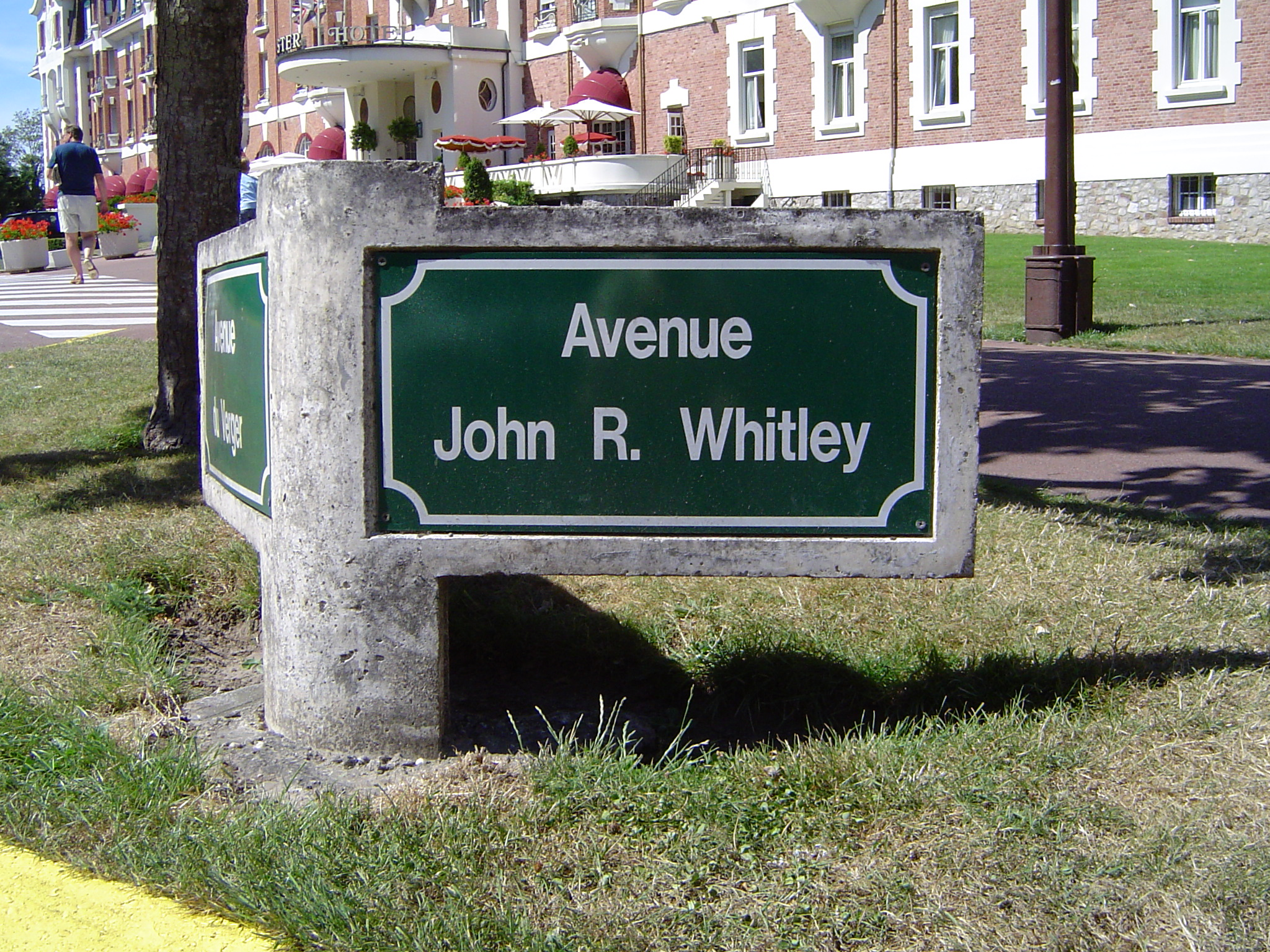

Before entering the family business, Whitley had been attending Leipzig University in 1866 where he met a French graduate of chemistry and fine art, called Louis Le Prince. The two men became friends and Whitley invited him to Leeds that same year. The following year Le Prince joined Joseph Whitley's firm and two years later, in 1869 married his daughter, Elizabeth Sarah, herself a talented artist and designer. John Whitley's own business schemes eventually created unsustainable debt and it was agreed that he should resign and seek his own fortune abroad in 1874 when he left for France.

=== The birth of Earl's Court Exhibition ===
Back in the United Kingdom in the early 1880s, John Whitley resolved to follow his dream of bringing nations together by emulating the great exhibitions of the past in Paris and London with the difference of concentrating on one industrialised country at a time. Charles Lowe characterised Whitley as follows:

a keen business faculty, a high degree of administrative skill, a daring spirit of enterprise, a personal knowledge of foreign countries and customs, great linguistic acquirements, refined perceptions in art coupled with a sense of being at home in all the fields of modern industry, a philanthropic heart, dauntless courage and an inflexible will—these are qualities, it must surely be admitted, which rarely go to the making up of any one character, and which rendered Mr. Whitley just the very man to undertake the task of bringing home to the minds and doors of his fellow-countrymen the life of foreign nations in concrete and concentrated form.

Having travelled widely in the world, he decided to capitalise on his acquaintance with the American showman, William Cody whom he had met while in the US and create an America-focused commercial fair around the Wild West Show. To this end he settled on the vast vacant 24 acre grounds created by the recently built railway lines and depot on the Fulham – West Brompton border and the nearby popular sporting venue, the Lillie Bridge Grounds. His ambitious concept came to fruition in 1887 under the name of the Earl's Court Exhibition Grounds. He had managed to persuade the railway companies which owned the land – a cabbage patch – to earn rent from leasing their property for a profitable and laudable cause. According to Charles Lowe, the contemporary commentator on Whitley's project, the idea of a joint venture with railway companies was later reproduced by the Metropolitan railway, owners of the cuttings at Wembley Park. The many contacts Whitley had, combined with his organisational skills ensured that his popular venture was graced by the visit in her Jubilee Year, of the monarch herself, Queen Victoria.

=== Competing managements ===
The exhibitions that followed the success of the America Fair and its 'Wild West Show' were not all in the hands of Whitley. He had to compete with other entrepreneurs, who like him, were none of them backed by the Government and straying occasionally into the foreign policy arena. Such was the case with the Spanish Exhibition of 1889 that Whitley had tried and failed to influence. He put on three more country-centred shows: Italy, France, and Germany to promote their industries and cultures. However, the British public may have been sated by such spectacle and evidently did not share Whitley's international enthusiasms. They were anyway not financially successful. His last project elicited comments such as, "Germania". Although the formula was later to be successfully reinstated for two decades by Whitley's successor at Earl's Court, the Hungarian impresario, Imre Kiralfy, and subsequently from the late 1930s onwards after Howard Crane's iconic Earls Court Exhibition Hall was built in 1937 (and demolished in 2014).

== The Touquet Experiment ==
Disappointed with his London projects over five years, in 1892, Whitley was thinking of other potential opportunities. The friendship of the Prince of Wales with members of the French government suggested an Entente Cordiale between France and the United Kingdom could be propitious for an enterprise over the Channel. Whitley began to search for a site on the Northern French coast between Saint-Valery-sur-Somme and Boulogne-sur-Mer. Although he happened on Fort-Mahon he quickly diverted his attention to a more interesting proposition between Berck and Canche, with an attractive forest and the newly created resort of Paris-Plage, with already 350 buildings, 3 hotels and a church.

When he arrived in Le Touquet-Paris-Plage in 1894 the landowners, the Daloz family, were not ready to sell up. He therefore decided to buy a two kilometre stretch of coastline, 500 metres deep, south of Paris-Plage, with a view to creating there a new Anglo-French resort called Mayville in honour of Princess Mary of Teck. In 1895 he started the "Mayville Company Ltd", with a 50 strong syndicate of shareholders that numbered Louis Pasteur, Sarah Bernhardt and the second Duke of Morny among its members.

He remained in Le Touquet till 1905.

== The Hardelot development ==
Following differences in the Le Touquet community, over the routing of the new railway and other disputes especially with his erstwhile partner, Allen Stoneham, he left Le Touquet-Paris-Plage in 1905 and concentrated on the neighbouring resort of Hardelot-Plage, where he was the owner of the chateau since 1897.

He died of a heart attack in his Chateau in Condette in the current rue John-Whitley, formerly rue du Choquel, on 21 March 1922.
He is buried at Condette.

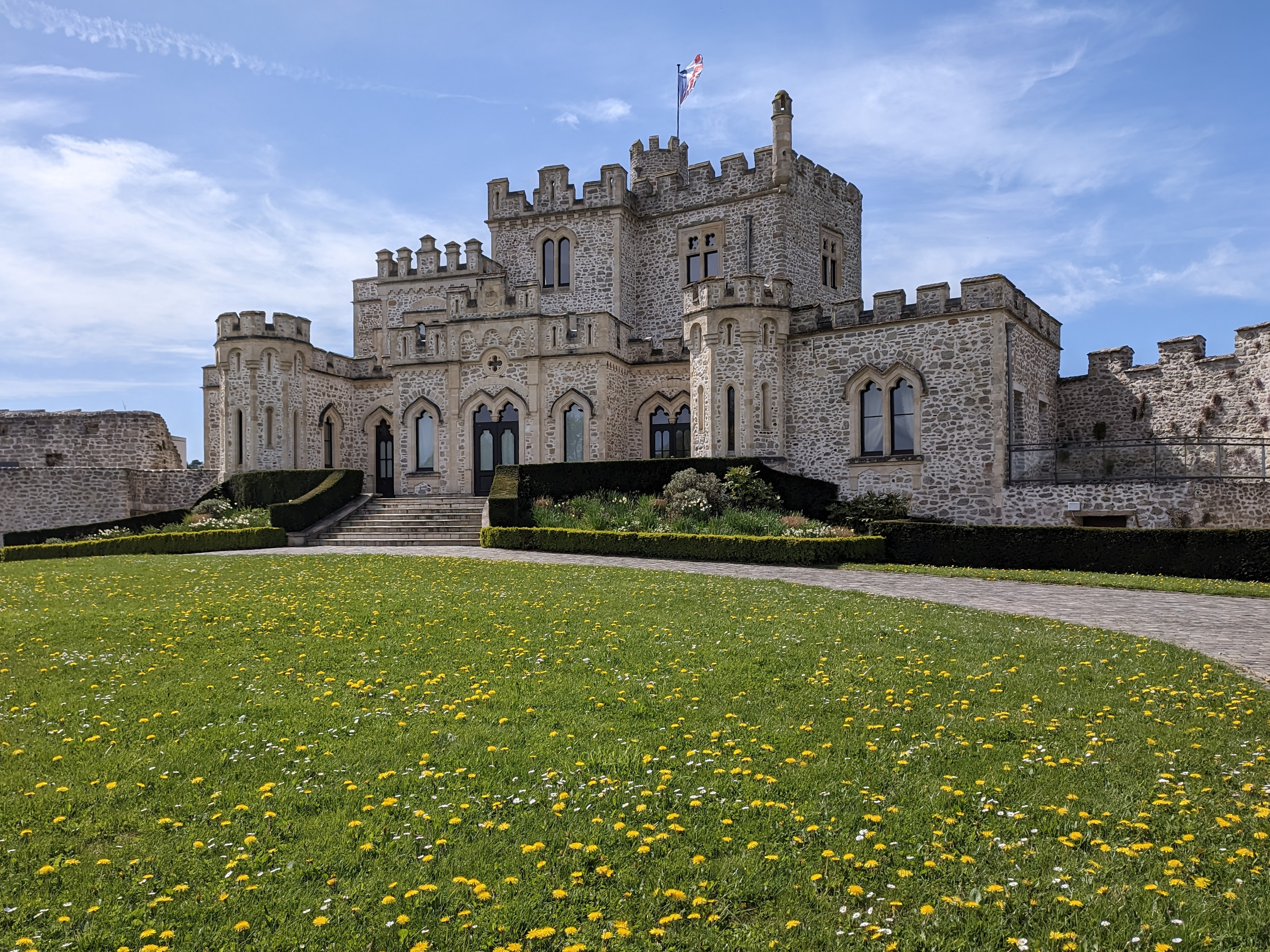
The chateau of Hardelot, where John Whiltley had lived

John Whitley is commemorated by an avenue named after him in Neufchâtel-Hardelot, in Paris-Plage and the street in Condette.

== Family ==
- Joseph Whitley married Sarah Robinson in 1842
  - Elizabeth Whitley married Louis Le Prince
  - Joseph Whitley (1845–?)
  - John Whitley married Ellen Naylor in Manchester Cathedral on 17 February 1871. There were four children of the marriage:
    - Arthur (1871–1940) married firstly Mabel Jones (?-1910) and secondly Mildred Roberts (1882–1965)
      - John Whitley (1905–1997) Air Marshal during World War II knighted for services in the Royal Air Force.
      - Pamela (1908–1980)
      - Daphne (1914–2009)
    - Helen Dorothy (1874–1929) in whose honour two streets in Touquet-Paris-Plage are named: Dictionnaire des rues du Touquet-Paris-Plage#Dorothée (avenue et rue)|avenue Dorothée and rue Dorothée.
    - Beatrice (1878–1950)
    - Marion (1882–1954)

== See also ==
- Roundhay Garden Scene

== Bibliography ==
- John R. Whitley: a sketch of his life and work (1912) Dryden Press. Reissued by Nabu Press; EdicióN: Large Type Edition, 2010. ISBN 978-1143924040
- Bridger, Bobby. Buffalo Bill and Sitting Bull: Inventing the Wild West. Volume 21 of M. K. Brown Range Life Series. University of Texas Press, 2002 ISBN 978-0292709171
