= Accordion Player =

1888 silent film

- Accordion Player (1888)
- Directed by: Louis Le Prince
- Starring: Adolphe Le Prince
- Cinematography: Louis Le Prince
- Release date: 14 October 1888
- Running time: 10 seconds
- Country: United Kingdom
- Language: Silent

Accordion Player is a short silent motion picture directed by Louis Le Prince. It is one of the earliest surviving motion pictures. The brief film shows a man (Adolphe Le Prince) playing the diatonic button accordion in a single, static shot, highlighting the pioneering experiments in motion capture during the late 19th century.

It was recorded on the steps of the house of Joseph Whitley, Louis's father-in-law. The recording date may be the same as Roundhay Garden as the camera is in a similar position and Adolphe is dressed the same.

== Cast ==
- Adolphe Le Prince as the accordion player
