= Annie Hartley =

English actress (1873–1898)

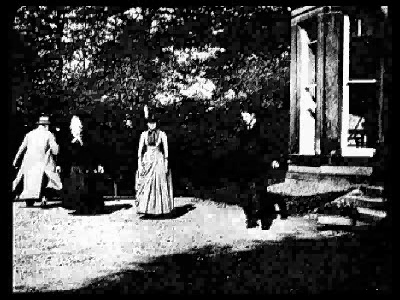
- Hartley (third from left) in Roundhay Garden Scene, directed by Louis Le Prince
- Born: Harriet Hartley; 1873; Yorkshire, England
- Died: 31 March 1898 (aged 25)
- Resting place: Ripponden, West Yorkshire, England

Annie Hartley (1873 – 31 March 1898) was an English woman who appeared in the 1888 short film Roundhay Garden Scene by Louis Le Prince. She was a close friend of Louis Le Prince and his mother-in-law Sarah Whitley, and her former employee. Hartley died on 31 March 1898, at the age of 25. Her cause of death was unknown. She was buried in Ripponden, West Yorkshire, England.

== Filmography ==
Year	Title	Role	Notes
1888	Roundhay Garden Scene	Self	Short, unconfirmed
