= It Is Never Too Late to Mend =

It Is Never Too Late to Mend may refer to:

- It Is Never Too Late to Mend (novel), an 1856 novel by Charles Reade
- It Is Never Too Late to Mend (1911 film), an Australian film, based on the novel
- It Is Never Too Late to Mend (1913 film), a 1913 film, based on the novel
- It's Never Too Late to Mend, a 1937 British melodrama film, based on the novel
