= Leeds Bridge =

Bridge in Leeds, West Yorkshire, England

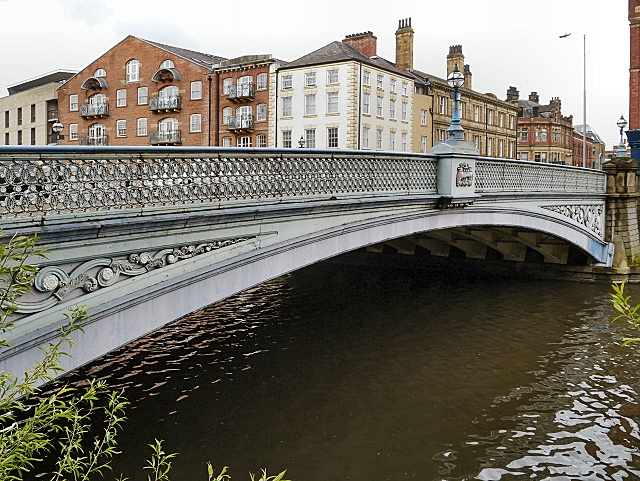
- Coordinates: 53.7939°N 1.5418°W
- Carries: Bridge End
- Crosses: River Aire
- Locale: Leeds, West Yorkshire
- Heritage status: Grade II listed

Characteristics
- Design: arch bridge
- Material: Cast iron

History
- Opened: 1870

Location
- Interactive map of Leeds Bridge

Leeds Bridge is a historic river crossing in Leeds, England. The present cast iron road bridge over the River Aire dates from 1870. It is Grade II listed.

== History ==
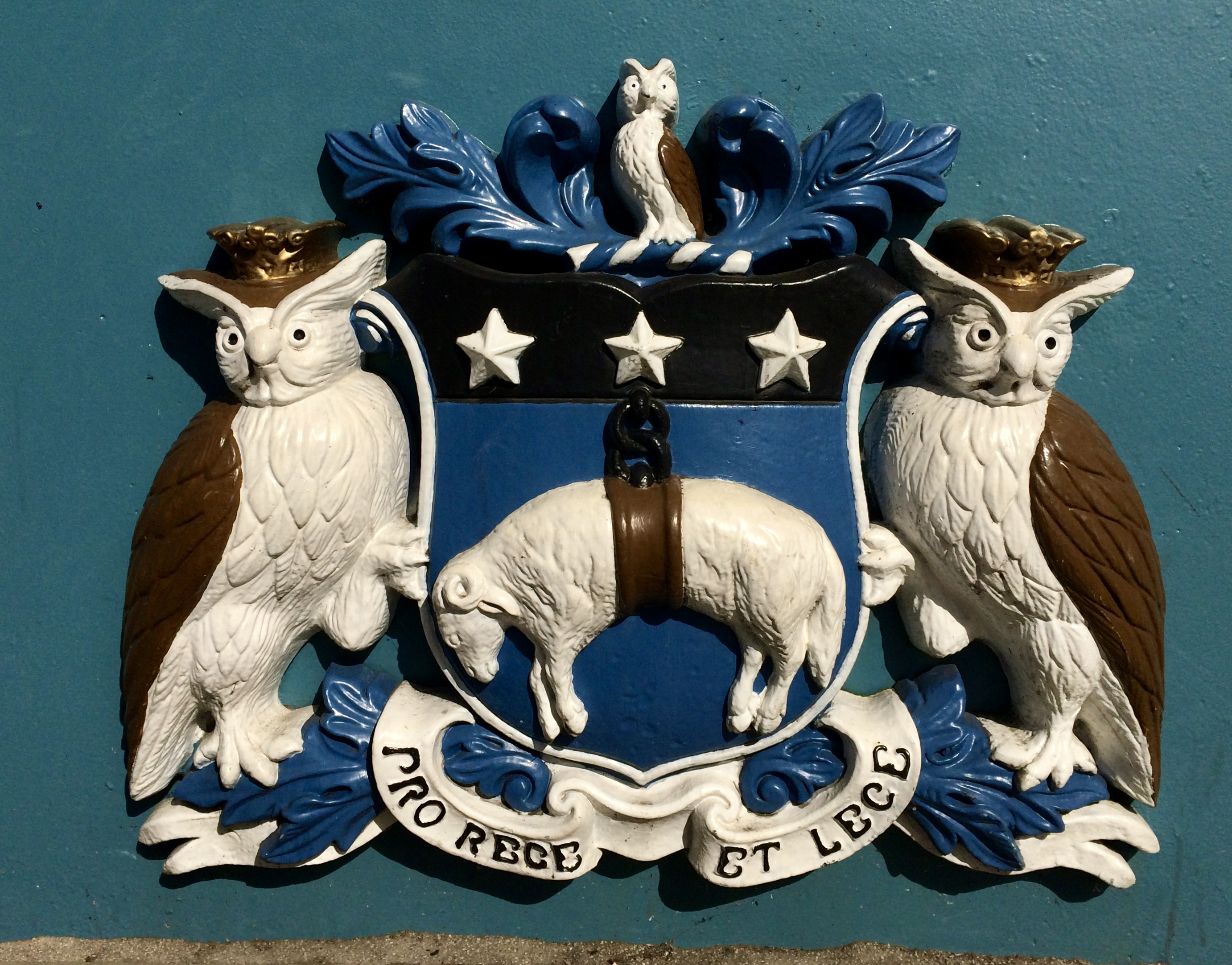
Coat of arms of Leeds on the bridge

The medieval town of Leeds centred on 13th century burgess building plots either side of a wide road from the river crossing called Bridge Gate, now Briggate. A wool cloth market operated at Leeds Bridge, becoming the centre of wool trade for the West Riding of Yorkshire in the late 17th century.

A medieval bridge was built at the site of a ferry across the River Aire. It was widened in 1730 and 1760. The bridge was rebuilt in 1870–73 by William Henry Barlow to a design by T. Dyne Steel. The iron was cast by John Butler of Stanningley. The cast iron balustrade is of rings and flowers. The east side bears the arms of the Corporation of Leeds (crowned owls and fleece). The western side has the names of civic dignitaries on a plaque. Stone scavenged from the ruined Kirkstall Abbey was used to build steps which led to the river bank. Though five other bridges were constructed between 1818 and 1870, the Leeds Bridge was the busiest, and in 1869 it was used by 4,000 vehicles and 55,000 foot passengers each Saturday.

Leeds Bridge by John Atkinson Grimshaw, 1880

The bridge was previously part of the A61, a major road through Yorkshire, though this has now been bypassed. It marks the western terminus of the Aire and Calder Navigation which opened in 1700 creating a vital goods transportation infrastructure.

In 2018, major restoration work took place on the bridge, including structural strengthening, and cleaning and repainting to preserve the bridge's appearance and stop it from deteriorating.

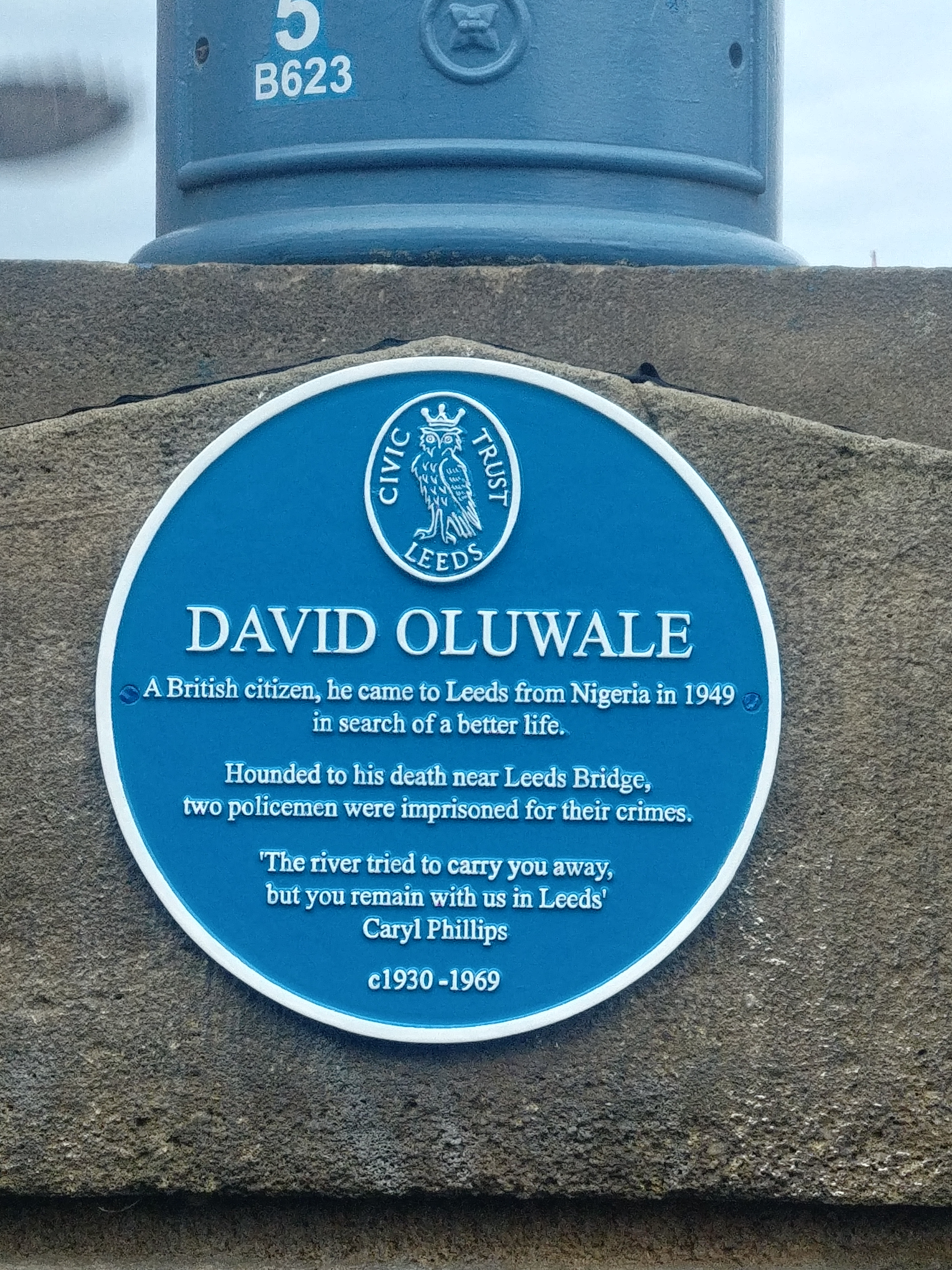
Blue Plaque for David Oluwale

On 25 April 2022 a blue plaque commemorating the death of David Oluwale was unveiled on the bridge by Leeds Civic Trust and the David Oluwale Memorial Association. It was stolen hours later in an event that West Yorkshire Police are treating as a hate crime.

== Culture ==
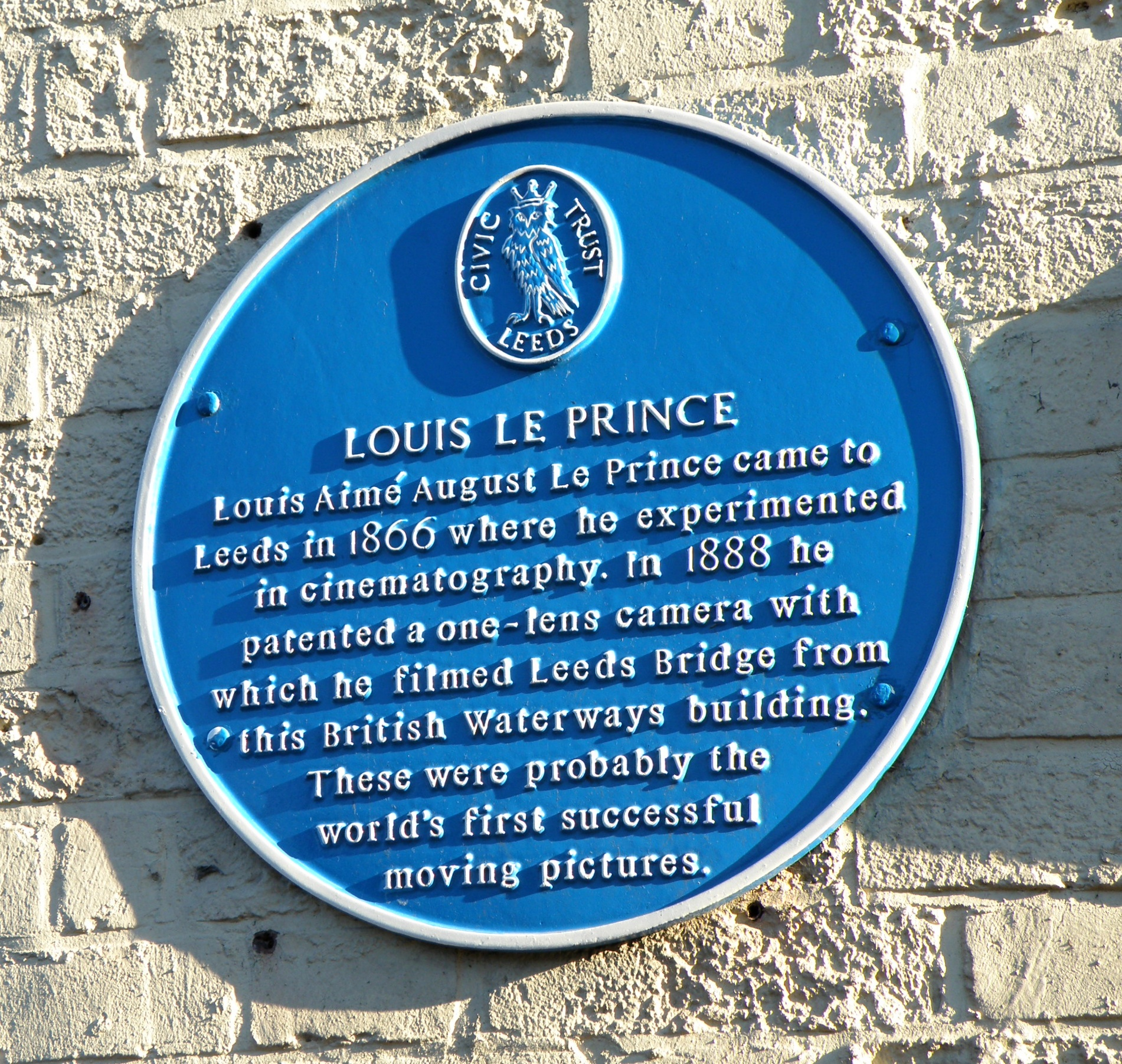
Plaque commemorating Louis Le Prince

In 1875, local inhabitants assembled onto the bridge, Briggate and local streets to watch The Theatre burning down.

In 1888 Louis Le Prince made a pioneering moving picture recording of Traffic Crossing Leeds Bridge from an upstairs window of No 19 Bridge End, then Hicks the Ironmongers. This was shortly after making his first film Roundhay Garden Scene.

== See also ==
- Listed buildings in Leeds (City and Hunslet Ward - southern area)
