= Traffic Crossing Leeds Bridge =

1888 silent film

- The film
- Directed by: Louis Le Prince
- Cinematography: Louis Le Prince
- Release date: 1888
- Running time: 3 seconds
- Country: United Kingdom
- Language: Silent

Traffic Crossing Leeds Bridge is a short silent motion picture directed by Louis Le Prince; it is an early motion picture capturing everyday life. The short film shows horse-drawn carriages and pedestrians crossing Leeds Bridge in England, offering a dynamic glimpse into 19th-century urban activity and marking a milestone in early cinematography.

The earliest copy belongs to the 1923 NMPFT inventory (frames 118–120 and 122–124), though this longer sequence comes from the 1931 inventory (frames 110–129). According to Adolphe Le Prince who assisted his father when this film was shot in late October 1888, it was taken at 20fps. However, the digitally stabilised sequence produced by the NMPFT lasts two seconds, meaning the footage is playing here at 10fps. As with the Roundhay Garden sequence, its appearance is sped up, suggesting the original footage was probably shot at 7fps. This would fit with what we know of the projection experiments, where James Longley reported a top speed of 7fps.
