= Leeds Bridge (painting) =

Painting by John Atkinson Grimshaw

- Artist: John Atkinson Grimshaw
- Year: 1880
- Type: Oil on canvas, cityscape
- Dimensions: 74.9 cm × 121.9 cm (29.5 in × 48.0 in)
- Location: Leeds Art Gallery, Leeds

Leeds Bridge is an oil painting on canvas by the British artist John Atkinson Grimshaw, from 1880.

== History and description ==
A cityscape, it features a view of the River Aire in Leeds in West Yorkshire. Shown from Leeds Bridge it captures the industrial landscape of the city with boats and warehouses. In the distance is Leeds Minster. It was produced the same year as another of his noted river scenes his Reflections on the Thames, Westminster and was bought by one of his regular patrons Walter Battle.

The Leeds-born Grimshaw became well known for his nocturnes, frequently featuring urban areas of the Victorian period bathed in light. The painting is today part of the collection of Leeds Art Gallery, having been acquired in 1927.

== Bibliography ==
- Angiuli, Emanuela & Spurrell, Katy. De Nittis e Tissot: pittori della vita moderna. Skira, 2006.
- Robertson, Alexander. Atkinson Grimshaw. Phaidon Press, 1996.
