= Joseph Whitley =

English actor (1816–1891)

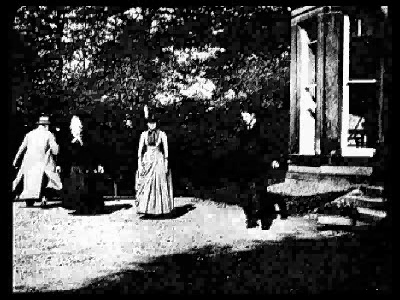
- Whitley (far left) in Roundhay Garden Scene, directed by Louis Le Prince
- Born: 17 October 1816; Wakefield, Yorkshire, England
- Died: 12 January 1891 (aged 74); New York City, U.S.
- Spouse: Sarah Whitley (m. 1842; died 1888)
- Children: John Robinson Whitley (1843–1922); Sarah Elizabeth LePrice, née Whitley (1846–1925); Joseph (?–?)

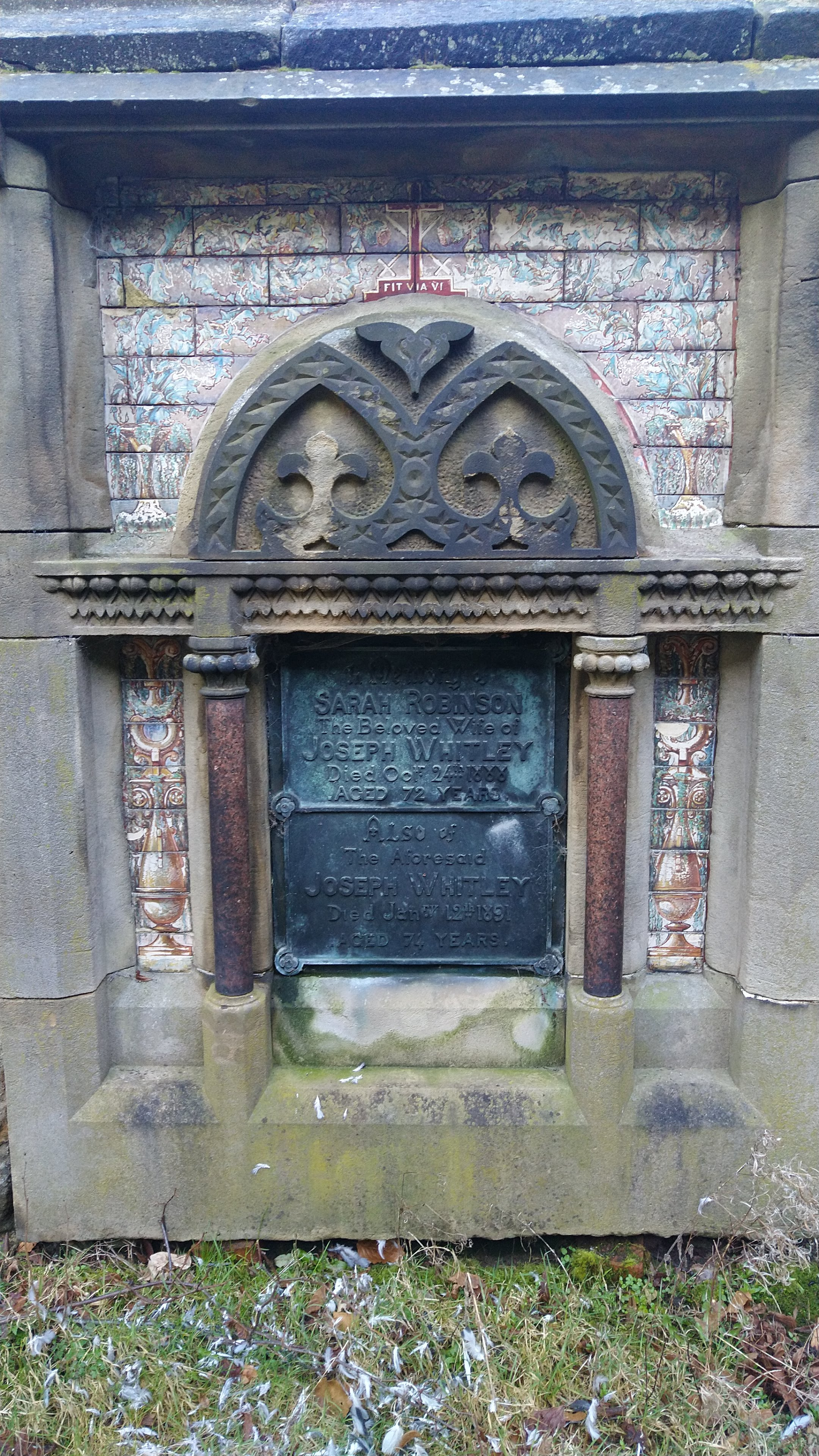
Gravestone in Roundhay Churchyard, Leeds, of Sarah Robinson, and her husband, Joseph Whitley

Joseph Whitley (17 October 1816 – 12 January 1891) was an English mechanical engineer and metallurgist. He appears in the Roundhay Garden Scene, the earliest known film fragment, shot by his son-in-law Louis Le Prince.

He can be seen as the man with the flying tail-coat in Roundhay Garden Scene, walking next to his wife, Sarah.

Whitley died on 12 January 1891, at the age of 74.

== Filmography ==
Year	Title	Role	Notes
1888	Roundhay Garden Scene	Self	Short
