= Adolphe Le Prince =

English actor (1872–1901)

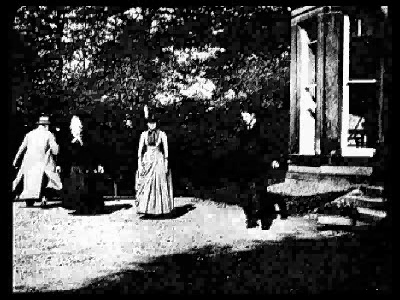
- Le Prince (far right) in Roundhay Garden Scene, directed by Louis Le Prince
- Born: Louis Adolphe Whitley Le Prince; April 6 1872; Leeds, Yorkshire, England
- Died: 20 August 1901 (aged 28); Fire Island, New York, U.S.
- Cause of death: Suicide by gunshot
- Parents: Louis Le Prince (father); Sarah Elizabeth Whitley (mother)

Adolphe Le Prince (6 April 1872–20 August 1901) was an English actor. He appeared in Roundhay Garden Scene, the earliest surviving film.

In 1898, Le Prince appeared as a witness for the defence in a lawsuit brought by Thomas Edison against the American Mutoscope Company. Le Prince testified about the inventions of his late father, Louis Le Prince, rebutting Edison's claim to be the inventor of cinematography, and therefore entitled to royalties for the use of the process.

== Death ==
Adolphe and his family had tried desperately to find his father following the latter's mysterious disappearance on 16 September 1890, to no avail. Adolphe later retreated to the house he and his brothers built as a refuge for his mother in Point O' Woods, New York, vicinity of Fire Island, for the summer, and in August the rest of the family joined him. On the afternoon of 20 August 1901, Le Prince picked up his hunting gun and went shooting for ducks in the area. He walked out into the sand dunes and fatally shot himself through the forehead. The official verdict was suicide.

== Filmography ==
Year	Title	Role	Notes
1888	Roundhay Garden Scene	Self	Short
1888	Accordion Player	Accordion Player	Short
