= Sarah Whitley =

English actress (1816–1888)

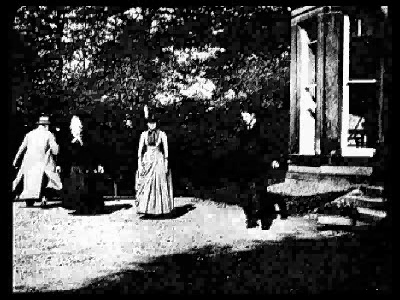
- Whitley (second from left) in Roundhay Garden Scene, directed by Louis Le Prince
- Born: Sarah Robinson; 1816; Wakefield, Yorkshire, England, United Kingdom of Great Britain and Ireland
- Died: 24 October 1888 (aged 71–72); United Kingdom of Great Britain and Ireland
- Resting place: St John's Church, Roundhay
- Spouse: Joseph Whitley (m. 1842)
- Children: John Robinson Whitley (1843–1922); Sarah Elizabeth LePrice, née Whitley (1846–1925); Joseph (?–?)

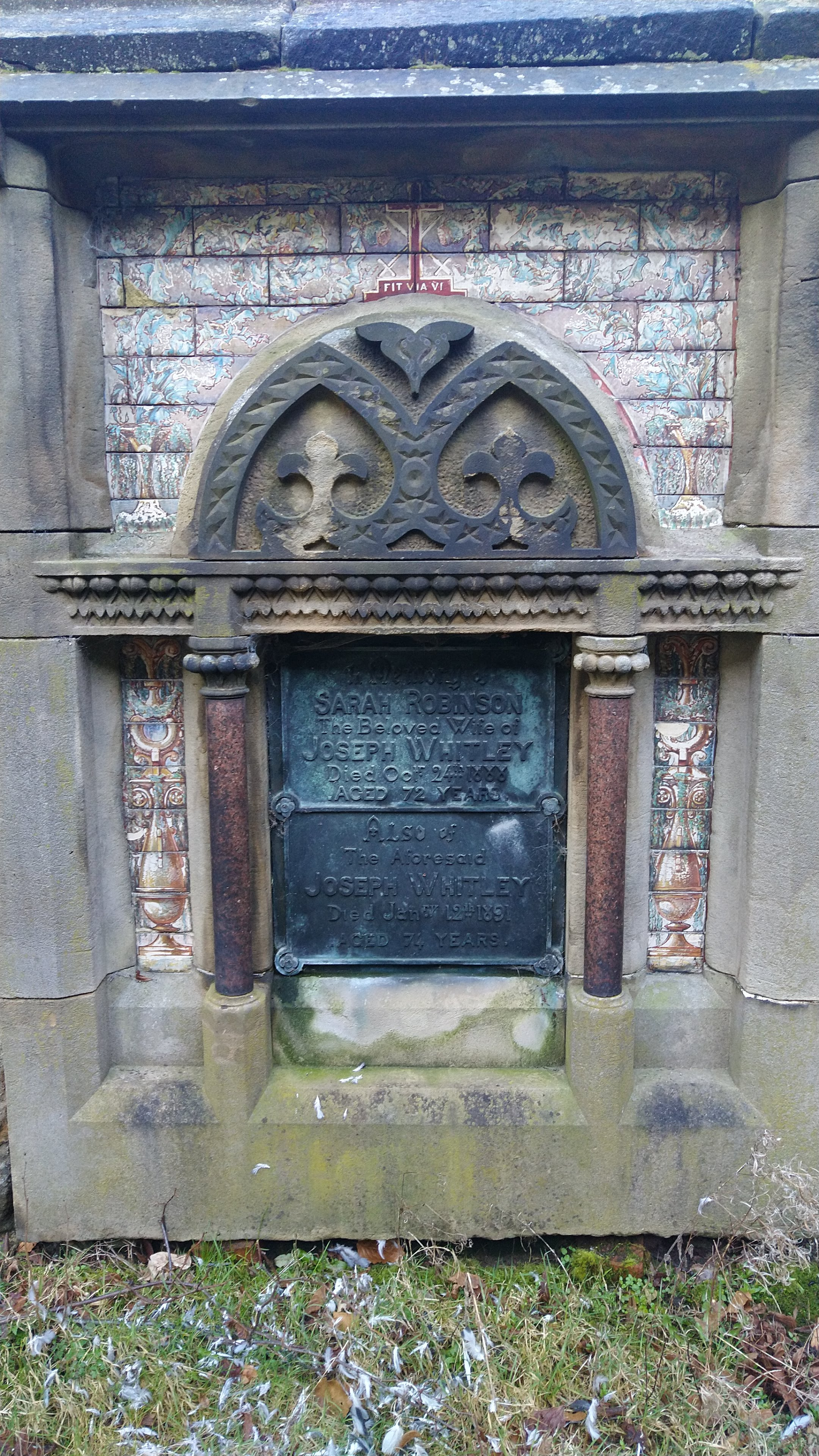
Gravestone in Roundhay Churchyard, Leeds, of Sarah Robinson, and her husband, Joseph Whitley

Sarah Whitley (née Robinson, 1816 – 24 October 1888) was credited as the earliest-born woman known to have appeared in a film. She was the mother-in-law of cinematic pioneer Louis Le Prince and was filmed by him 10 days before her death, aged 72.

In the 1888 film, Roundhay Garden Scene, Whitley is seen walking or dancing backwards.

She and her husband Joseph, who also appears in the film, were the parents of Le Prince's wife, Elizabeth. The film was shot in their garden at Oakwood Grange, Roundhay, Leeds, on 14 October 1888.

She is the earliest-born woman known to have appeared in a film. The earliest-born man was Pope Leo XIII (1810–1903). He was filmed in 1896. She was also the first known person who had appeared in a film to die.

== Death ==
Whitley's death on 24 October 1888, is commemorated by a gravestone in the churchyard of St John's Church, Roundhay.

== Filmography ==
Year	Title	Role	Notes
1888	Roundhay Garden Scene	self	Short
