= The Theatre, Leeds =

Theatre in West Yorkshire, England, 1771–1875

The Theatre
- Theatre Royal; Royal Theatre and Opera House
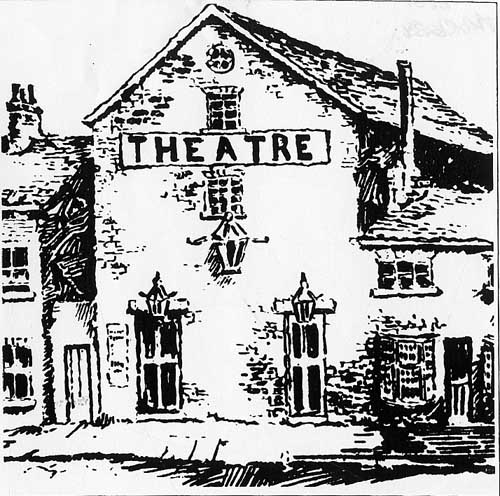
- The Theatre, Leeds, early 19th century
- Interactive map of The Theatre
- Address: Meadow Lane; Hunslet, Leeds; England LS11 5BJ
- Coordinates: 53.7925°N 1.5418°W
- Owner: First: Tate Wilkinson; Last: John Coleman
- Operator: Wilkinson; later Coleman
- Capacity: 1st phase: 600; 2nd phase: 2,560
- Type: Music hall, Drama, Comic opera

Construction
- Opened: 24 May 1771
- Closed: 28 May 1875, burned down
- Rebuilt: September 1867, Thomas Angelo Moore
- Architects: 1st phase: unknown 2nd phase: Thomas Angelo Moore (1840–1891) of Sunderland

Website
- Leodis: history of The Theatre

The Theatre in Hunslet, Leeds, West Yorkshire, England, was a theatre for summer shows, built in 1771 by Tate Wilkinson and redeveloped in 1867. Mrs Siddons and Ching Lau Lauro appeared here in 1786 and 1834 respectively. It was the only drama theatre in Leeds until 1864, after which business was challenged by competition. It became shabby and was partially rebuilt in 1867 to create the smarter Royal Theatre, which was to burn down in 1875. No theatre was built again on this site, and its surviving Victorian successors are the Leeds City Varieties of 1865 and the Grand Theatre of 1878.

== Building and location ==
The Theatre of 1771 was a fairly basic brick building of 86 by 40 feet (26 m × 12 m). It was on the east side of Meadow Lane, Hunslet, Leeds, near Leeds Bridge. In his Memoirs of 1790, Tate Wilkinson described it as "quite a palace." However The Leeds Guide of 1806 despaired of it: "Its form inconvenient, and utterly unworthy of the populous and flourishing town to which it belongs." By 1867 it was remembered as a "dingy little theatre" and a "barn out of repair," although it hosted fine plays. It had a vestibule, gallery, boxes and pit, and an audience of 600 could be crammed in, but the stage and auditorium were the same size. It was said by the actress Dorothea Jordan that the green room "was miserable and cold, half the upper part of it admitting the wind and the rain," although advertisements in the Leeds Intelligencer said the stage was "elegantly illuminated by wax candles." The New Theatre Royal and Opera House of 1867 had grander pretensions, having all facilities.

== History ==
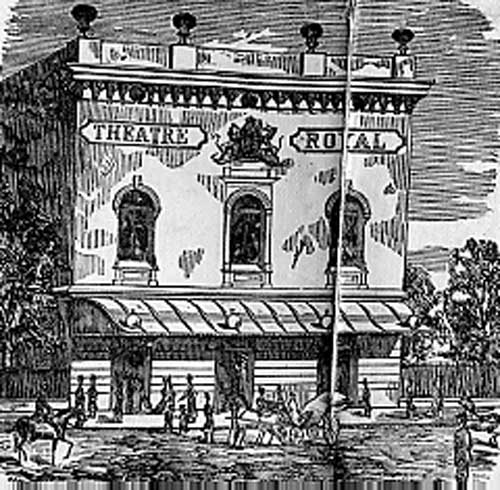
The Royal Theatre, 1867–1875. Confusingly the nameboard still says "Theatre Royal".

=== Theatre or Theatre Royal ===
The Theatre was built in 1771 by actor-manager Tate Wilkinson (1739–1803). It was part of his repertory company's York Theatre Circuit which included York, Doncaster, Halifax, Hull, Leeds, Pontefract, and Wakefield. These theatres were built to Wilkinson's order from 1768 to 1803. There followed various other managers, including his son John. Sometime after 1834 its name was changed to the Theatre Royal, not to be confused with the Royal Theatre which was a later development of the same building. Business was difficult due to the small size of the theatre, its poor condition, its inconvenient location away from the city centre and the heavy industry surrounding the site.

Encouraged by the new railways which gave opportunity for a northern theatre circuit, the actor John Coleman bought the theatre in 1863. It was successful until 1864, when the new Amphitheatre was built in Lands Lane. Coleman responded by refurbishing the interior. It was successful, but not enough for Coleman, who attempted and failed to purchase land to build another city-centre theatre.

=== Royal Theatre ===
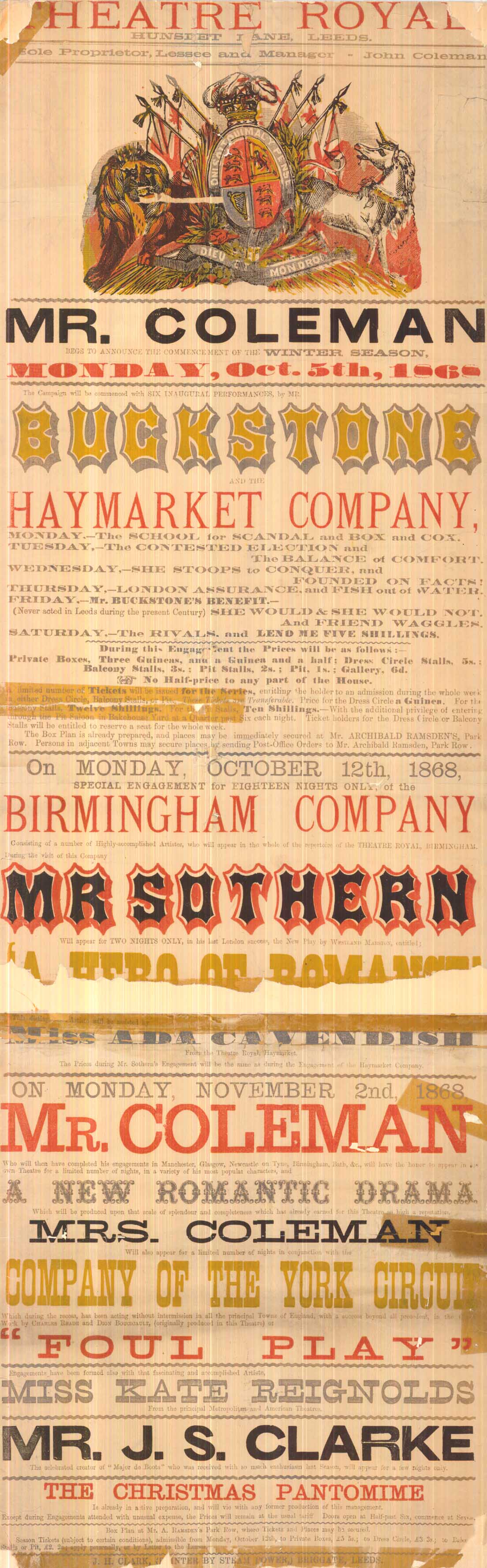
Royal Theatre playbill for 1868. Confusingly it is still called the "Theatre Royal".

Coleman developed the New Royal Theatre and Opera House (later the Royal Theatre) from the remains of the partly demolished Theatre Royal (previously The Theatre) in 1867. Johnson's New Guide to Leeds was happy with this building; it was "replete with every modern appliance, both before and behind the curtain." It had a simple frontage "of the Italian Style," and the Leeds Times described it thus:

The box entrance is the central avenue; the foyer is lofty, spacious and well-lighted; the floor is inlaid with tesselated tiles; there is a large and handsome fireplace, with a radiating hearth-stove ... and over the magnificent marble mantelpiece is a large mirror; whilst exquisite statues line the niches on either hand. A large stone staircase leads to the grand tier. The ladies' saloon is a perfect boudoir, for here are ranged round luxurious settees of maplewood covered with silk velvet. Abutting upon the saloon is the lavatory, which is replete with every comfort and convenience requisite for a public place of amusement. Immediately adjacent are the gentlemen's saloons, coffee rooms etc., which are to be fitted up in a very elegant manner. The dress circle is estimated to seat one hundred, and the balcony one hundred persons; there are twenty private boxes, each of which will accommodate eight visitors, and these are provided with settees of silk velvet with spring cushions ... The pit is approached by a long and spacious corridor, and will provide ample accommodation for nearly eleven hundred spectators. The entrance to the gallery is from the back of the theatre, through Waterloo Street, and in this part of the house, seats have been provided for upwards of eleven hundred people ... The staircases are of stone, and, in the event of an alarm of fire ever taking place, there are several exits, so that the building can be cleared in an inconceivably short time. Every convenience has been provided for the accommodation of the visitors to the pit and gallery, each of which have their separate saloons, coffee-rooms etc.

The decorations which are carried out by Mr Andrew Jackson, are of the most artistic and recherche description, Mr Coleman having been fortunate as to obtain them from designs of the decorations of the Palace of Versailles. The designs in terracotta, and the elaborate proscenium, are from the studio of Mr Walker, of this town. Messrs Singleton and Tennant have provided all the ornamental and other ironwork; the plumbers' work has been executed by Messrs Lindley and Johnson. Many other contracts have been carried out by other tradesmen in the town, and the whole building has been erected by Messrs Nicholson & Son, under the personal superintendence of the architect Thomas Angelo Moore, (of Thomas Moore & Son, Sunderland) . . .

Complete as the building is in front, behind the stage it is really wonderful. There are upwards of twenty dressing and retiring rooms, in each of which hot and cold water has been laid on. The stage is simply marvellous. Every square inch of it takes up like the pieces of a child's puzzle. There are traps, slides, slotes, scruter work, counterweights and scores of other complicated arrangements which we do not understand, and cannot therefore attempt to describe. Suffice it that Mr Huby, the clever machinist, who has invented the stage, alleges that he can either draw up or sink down pieces of scenery thirty feet wide and thirty feet high. Hence, in pantomime time, we may expect to see groups of fairies floating about in mid air, descending from the heights above, or ascending from the abyss beneath. To add to effects of this kind, a magnificent gas apparatus has been laid on by Mr Smith, the celebrated gas engineer, from Birmingham, in addition to which an illuminating machine has been obtained in the shape of a new limelight apparatus, by means of which upwards of thirty different colours of lights can be thrown upon the stage at one time. Above the whole of the machinery is the lofty and commodious carpenter's shop. Over the roof of the pit, the large property store-room, and immediately adjacent the painting-room, which is, without exception, the very best we have ever seen; we doubt whether any metropolitan theatre has one equal to it. _{Leeds Times 28 September 1867}

However, on 28 May 1875 the Royal Theatre was destroyed by fire, and it was never rebuilt.

Destruction of the Theatre Royal, Leeds

The Theatre Royal, Leeds, the property of J. Coleman, was last night completely destroyed by fire. Fortunately the performance last night had been concluded, and the large audience had been dispersed scarcely five minutes before the fire was discovered. About twenty minutes to eleven flames were suddenly seen issuing from the high building forming the stage portion of the theatre. An alarm was at once given, and in a short time the fire brigade from the Town Hall and the fire brigades connected with the insurance offices were on the spot.

Meanwhile the flames had burst forth in the most alarming manner, threatening destruction not only to the theatre itself, but to the thickly clustered dwelling-houses in the adjoining courts. The hose connected with the theatre had been brought into use immediately on the fire being discovered, but those using it were soon compelled to retreat to the outside of the building. Burning scenery and timber rained down upon the stage, and soon filled the spacious auditorium with suffocating fumes. Some minutes before the arrival of any of the brigades, the flames, bursting through the roof, shot in terrible grandeur into the sky. The public-houses and other places of resort were just at this time closing, and in a few minutes Briggate, Leeds Bridge, and the narrow streets converging upon Hunslet Lane, in the vicinity of the theatre, were crowded with many thousands of spectators. It was obvious from the first that the entire structure was doomed. Showers of sparks falling upon the roof of the auditorium soon set fire to this portion of the premises. Slight as the wind was, it was sufficient to fan the flames, travelling in the direction of the principal entrance in Hunslet Lane. Within an hour from the discovery of the first outbreak the entire building was one mass of flame.

Seeing the utter hopelessness of attempting to save anything within the theatre itself (some loose properties in the front hall appeared to be all that was recovered) Mr Henderson, the chief constable, and Mr Baker, the superintendent of the Corporation Fire Brigade, wisely concentrated their efforts upon protecting the neighbouring property. By twelve o'clock the flames seemed to have exhausted all that was really in the theatre. The damage, at a rough estimate by Mr Coleman, the lessee, is said to amount to between £30,000 and £35,000. This is partially covered by insurance spread over a number of offices. Seven or eight years ago the theatre, which was originally opened in 1771, was partially rebuilt, considerably enlarged, and generally improved. The scenery, dresses, and property are described as having been exceedingly valuable. All are destroyed. In addition to the scenery and dresses required in the representation of The Two Orphans, there was an accumulation of the most valuable scenery, which had been painted as the requirements of different seasons called for it by the most eminent scenic artists. These it will be impossible to replace.

As to the origin of the fire, the accounts of some of those who were in the building at the time when the flames were first discovered seem to point to the property room. The fire originated in the neighbourhood of the flys or immediately above them, all concur in stating; and also that the first intimation of the fire was the falling onto the stage of portions of scenery, the upper parts of which were in flames. The actors and actresses and others who were engaged at the theatre lose the whole of their properties, which they had left in the building at the conclusion of last night's performance._{Bradford Observer, 29 May 1875}

The site is now empty except for a bus shelter and trees.

== Performances ==
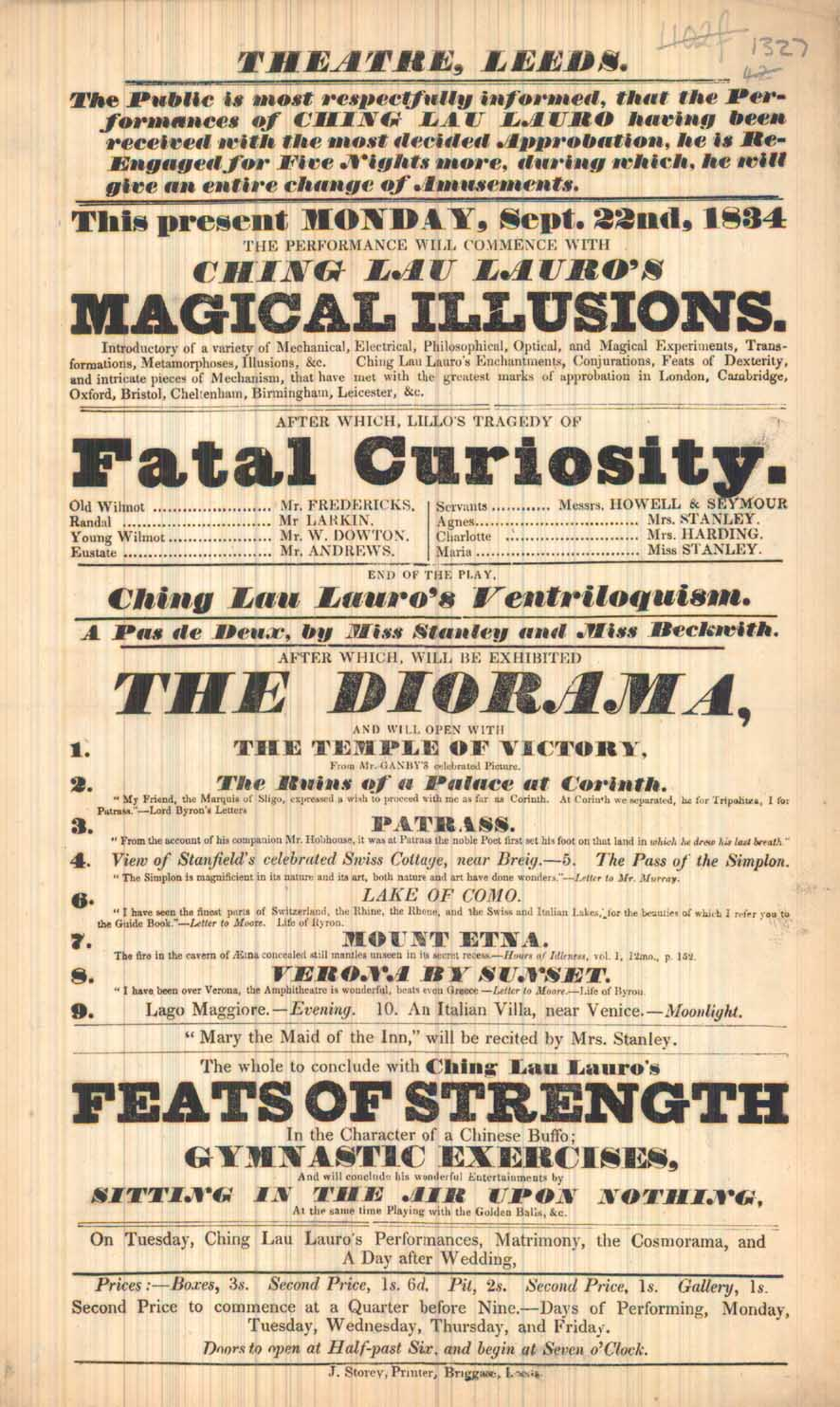
Ching Lau Lauro was top of the bill in 1834.

The Theatre was not a full-time theatre. Opening hours were six to seven pm, usually in May to July only, with three or four performances per week. This arrangement filled the gap while London theatres closed in summer, and famous actors could appear here, for example Sarah Siddons in 1786. Comic operas, adapted versions of Shakespeare's plays and pantomime were presented here. Often there were two dramas per night with singing or dancing in the interval. After John Coleman took over in 1863, his own company and touring companies were performing here, and he presented new dramas. The management attempted to increase income by letting in the poorer members of the public for half-price during the third act, but this caused disturbance and complaints. The New Royal Theatre opened every evening, hosting touring companies and putting on Christmas pantomimes.

The very first play at The Theatre was A Word to the Wise by Hugh Kelly on 24 May 1771.

On Wednesday last was open'd in this town, the new Theatre, with the Comedy of A Word to the Wise, to a numerous and polite audience, who express'd the greatest satisfaction at the moral tendency of the piece, and the merit of the performers. Mr Wilkinson (proprietor of the new Theatre in this town) has subscribed four guineas annually, to the General Infirmary._{Leeds Intelligencer, 30 July 1771}

On 20 June 1817, during the performance of The Tragedy of Jane Shore by Nicholas Rowe, leading actor Mr Cummins died. Playing the part of Dumont he fell down on stage and instantly expired of ossification of the heart. The performance was of course terminated at this point.

On 15–19, 22 and 23 September 1834, Ching Lau Lauro played here. Over this period he presented his ventriloquism, a piece called "Seraglio" and some new "Surprising Feats." alongside various plays. The melodrama version of It Is Never Too Late to Mend was presented in February 1865 to great acclaim.
