= It Is Never Too Late to Mend (1913 film) =

- Starring: Walter Edwin
- Distributed by: Edison Company
- Release date: 1913
- Running time: 2,000 feet
- Country: USA
- Language: silent

It Is Never Too Late to Mend is a 1913 American silent film version of the 1856 novel by Charles Reade. The film was released by the Edison Company.

Variety called it "forceful If rather elemental fiction and Its every point of dramatic power Is Intensified by the picture version. Its principal shortcoming la photo form Is that so long a story Is rather confused In spots to persons who have never read the tale."
