= The First Film =

2015 British documentary film about cinema pioneer Louis Le Prince

- Theatrical release poster
- Directed by: David Nicholas Wilkinson
- Release date: 2015
- Running time: 106 minutes
- Country: United Kingdom
- Language: English

The First Film is a 2015 British documentary film about cinema pioneer Louis Le Prince, made by David Nicholas Wilkinson. It argues the case that Le Prince, rather than the Lumière brothers, was the true inventor of moving pictures, making Roundhay Garden Scene in Leeds in 1888. Le Prince mysteriously disappeared in 1890.

Mark Kermode, film critic of The Guardian, described the documentary as "a flickering story that blends intrigue, industrial espionage, and possibly even murder".

The world premiere of The First Film was at the 2015 Edinburgh International Film Festival. It went on general release in the United States in September 2016.
