= It Is Never Too Late to Mend (novel) =

1856 novel by Charles Reade

It Is Never Too Late to Mend (sometimes written as It's Never Too Late to Mend) is an 1856 novel by the British writer Charles Reade. It was later turned into a play. A ruthless squire becomes obsessed with a younger woman and conspires to have her lover framed and sent to jail.

The book is mentioned in Jack Black's 1926 book You Can't Win as an inspiration to Black while in prison.

The Ven. George Hans Hamilton (21 Jan 1823 to 23 Sept 1905) was Chaplain of Durham Jail, and his fame concerning prison reform led to his being used as the original of the Chaplain in this book.

== Adaptations ==
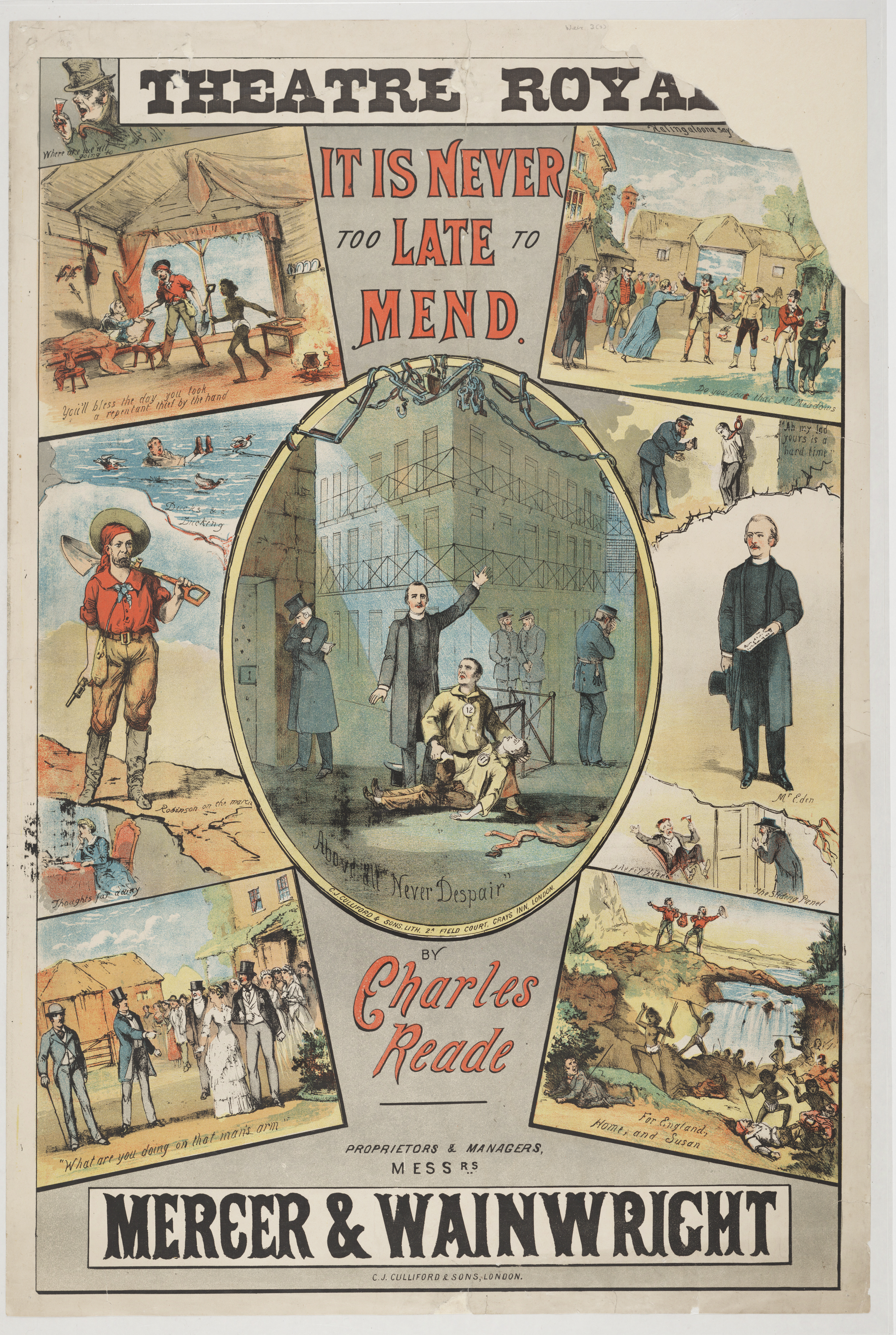
Theatre poster for It is never too late to mend

The play version was presented in February 1865 at The Theatre, Leeds to great acclaim.

The story has been turned into film several times including a 1911 Australian silent film It Is Never Too Late to Mend, a 1913 film, a 1922 silent film It's Never Too Late to Mend and a 1937 British sound film It's Never Too Late to Mend starring Tod Slaughter.

The novel was first published in a three-volume edition in London by Richard Bentley in 1856.
