= Louis Le Prince =

French motion-picture pioneer (1841–1890s)

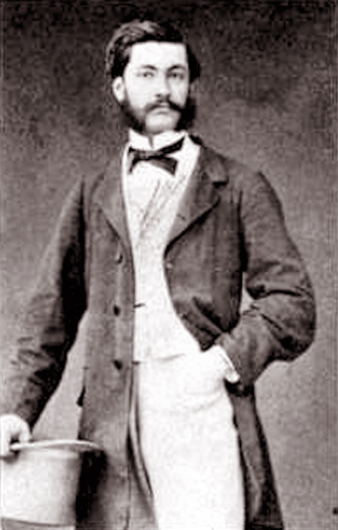
- Le Prince c. early 1860s
- Born: Louis Aimé Augustin Le Prince; 28 August 1841; Metz, France
- Disappeared: 16 September 1890 (aged 49); Dijon, France
- Status: Declared dead on 16 September 1897 (aged 56)
- Citizenship: France; United States (from 1889)
- Occupations: Artist, art teacher, inventor
- Spouse: Sarah Elizabeth Le Prince-Whitley (m. 1869)
- Children: 6, including Adolphe

Louis Aimé Augustin Le Prince (French: [lwi l(ə) pʁɛ̃s]; 28 August 1841 – disappeared 16 September 1890; declared dead 16 September 1897) was a French-American artist, cinematographer and the inventor of an early motion-picture camera, and director of Roundhay Garden Scene. He was possibly the first person to shoot a moving picture sequence using a single lens camera and a strip of (paper) film. He has been credited as the "Father of Cinematography" but, due to his disappearance in 1890, his work did not influence the commercial development of cinema.

In October 1888, Le Prince filmed moving-picture sequences of family members in Leeds, in the 1888 short films Roundhay Garden Scene, and Accordion Player (showing his son Adolphe Le Prince playing the accordion), using his single-lens camera and Eastman's paper negative film. In the next eighteen months, he also made the short film Traffic Crossing Leeds Bridge. His work appears to precede the inventions of his contemporaries, such as Friese-Greene and Donisthorpe as well as being years ahead of the Lumière brothers and Dickson (who did the moving image work for Thomas Edison). Le Prince disappeared on 16 September 1890. Numerous conspiracy theories emerged about his disappearance, including murder, disappearance in order to start a new life, and suicide. However, no conclusive evidence was found for any of these theories.

In early 1890, Edison workers had begun experimenting with celluloid film to capture moving images. The first public results of these experiments were shown in May 1891. Le Prince's widow and son, Adolphe, were keen to advance Louis's cause as the inventor of cinematography. In 1898, Adolphe appeared as a witness for the defence in a court case brought by Thomas Edison against the American Mutoscope Company, in which Edison claimed to be the first and sole inventor of cinematography, and thus entitled to royalties for the use of the process. Film shot with cameras built according to Le Prince's patent were presented. Eventually, the court ruled in Edison's favour, however, a year later that ruling was overturned, but Edison reissued his patents and succeeded in controlling the US film industry for many years.

Seven years after his disappearance, Le Prince was declared dead on 16 September 1897.

== Early life and education ==
Le Prince was born on 28 August 1841 in Metz. His family referred to him as "Augustin" and English-speaking friends would later call him "Gus". Le Prince's father was a major of artillery in the French Army and an officer of the Légion d'honneur. When growing up, he reportedly spent time in the studio of his father's friend, the pioneer of photography Louis Daguerre, from whom Le Prince may have received some lessons on photography and chemistry before he was 10 years old. His education went on to include the study of painting in Paris and post-graduate chemistry at Leipzig University, which provided him with the academic knowledge he was to utilise in the future.

== Career ==
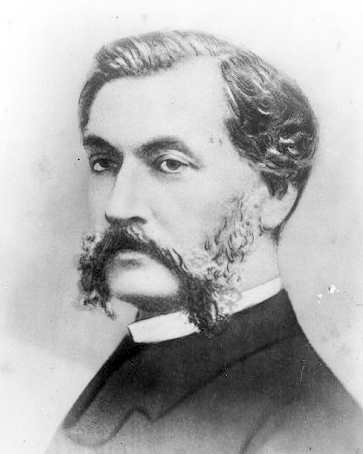
Le Prince in the 1880s

In conclusion, I would say that Mr. Le Prince was in many ways a very extraordinary man, apart from his inventive genius, which was undoubtedly great. He stood 6ft. 3in. or 4in. (190cm) in his stockings, well built in proportion, and he was most gentle and considerate and, though an inventor, of an extremely placid disposition which nothing appeared to ruffle.

— Declaration of Frederic Mason (wood-worker and assistant of Le Prince, April 21, 1931, American consulate of Bradford, England)

Le Prince moved to Leeds, England in 1866, after being invited to join John Whitley, a friend introduced by a former university lecturer, in Whitley Partners of Hunslet, a firm of brass founders making valves and components. In 1869 he married Sarah Elizabeth Whitley, John's sister and a talented artist. When in Paris during their honeymoon, Le Prince repeatedly visited a magic show, fascinated by an illusion with moving transparent figures, presumably a dancing skeleton projection at the Théâtre Robert-Houdin with multiple reflections of mirrors focused on one point or a variation of Pepper's Ghost.

Le Prince and his wife started a school of applied art, the Leeds Technical School of Art, and became well renowned for their work in fixing coloured photographs on to metal and pottery, leading to them being commissioned for portraits of Queen Victoria and the long-serving prime minister William Gladstone produced in this way; these were included alongside other mementos of the time in a time capsule—manufactured by Whitley Partners of Hunslet—which was placed in the foundations of Cleopatra's Needle on the embankment of the River Thames.

In 1881, Le Prince went to the United States as an agent for Lincrusta Walton, staying in the country along with his family once his contract had ended. He became the manager for a small group of French artists who produced large panoramas, usually of famous battles, that were exhibited in New York City, Washington, D.C. and Chicago.

During this time he began experiments relating to the production of 'moving' photographs, designing a camera that utilised sixteen lenses, which was the first invention he patented. Although the camera was capable of 'capturing' motion, it wasn't a complete success because each lens photographed the subject from a slightly different viewpoint and thus the image would have jumped about, if he had been able to project it (which is unknown).

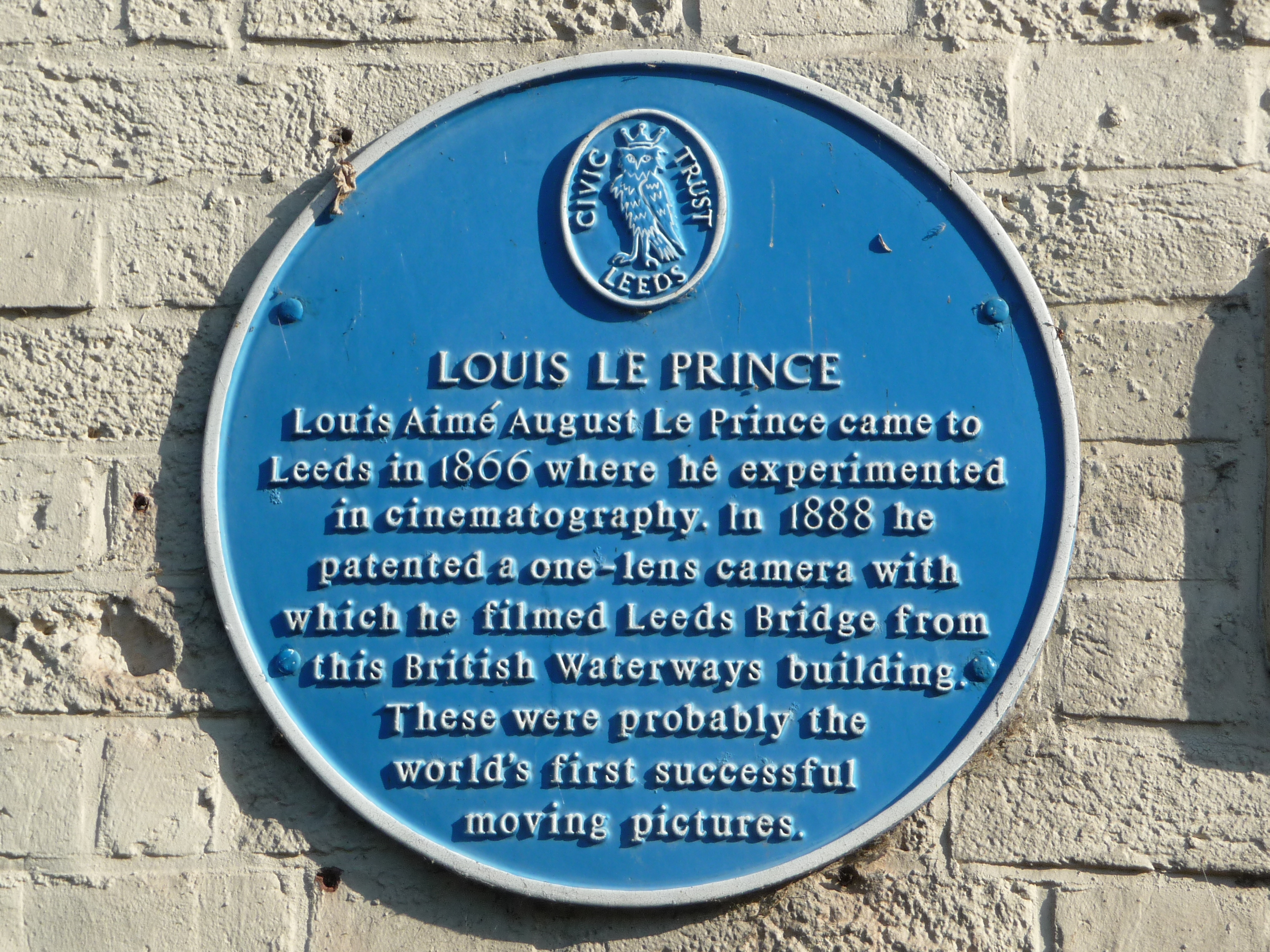
Plaque on Leeds Bridge

After his return to Leeds in May 1887, Le Prince built a single-lens camera in mid-late 1888. An experimental model was developed in a workshop at 160 Woodhouse Lane, Leeds and used to shoot his motion-picture films. It was first used on 14 October 1888 to shoot what would become known as Roundhay Garden Scene and a sequence of his son Adolphe playing the accordion. Le Prince later used it to film road traffic and pedestrians crossing Leeds Bridge. The film was shot from Hicks the Ironmongers, now the British Waterways building on the south east side of the bridge and marked with a commemorative Blue plaque.

== Disappearance ==
In September 1890, Le Prince was preparing for a trip to the United States, supposedly to publicly premiere his work and join his wife and children. Before this journey, he decided to return to France to visit his brother in Dijon. Then, on 16 September, he took a train to Paris, but having taken a later train than planned, his friends in Paris discovered that he was not on board. He was never seen again by his family or friends, nor was the luggage he was traveling with ever found. The last person to see Le Prince at the Dijon station was his brother. The French police, Scotland Yard and the family undertook exhaustive searches, but never found him. Le Prince was officially declared dead in 1897. A number of mostly unsubstantiated theories have been proposed.

=== Patent Wars assassination, "Equity 6928" ===
Christopher Rawlence pursues the assassination theory, along with other theories, and discusses the Le Prince family's suspicions of Edison over patents (the Equity 6928) in his 1990 book and documentary The Missing Reel. Rawlence claims that at the time that he vanished, Le Prince was about to patent his 1889 projector in the UK and then leave Europe for his scheduled New York official exhibition. His widow assumed foul play though no concrete evidence has ever emerged and Rawlence prefers the suicide theory.

In 1898, Le Prince's elder son Adolphe, who had assisted his father in many of his experiments, was called as a witness for the American Mutoscope Company in their litigation with Edison [Equity 6928]. By citing Le Prince's achievements, Mutoscope hoped to annul Edison's subsequent claims to have invented the moving-picture camera. Le Prince's widow Lizzie and Adolphe hoped that this would gain recognition for Le Prince's achievement, but when the case went against Mutoscope their hopes were dashed. Three years later, 28-year-old Adolphe was found dead on Fire Island near New York, having died by suicide by shooting himself through his forehead.

=== Disappearance ordered by the family ===
In 1966, Jacques Deslandes proposed a theory in Histoire comparée du cinéma (The Comparative History of Cinema), claiming that Le Prince voluntarily disappeared due to financial reasons and "familial conveniences". Journalist Léo Sauvage quotes a note shown to him by Pierre Gras, director of the Dijon municipal library, in 1977, that claimed Le Prince died in Chicago in 1898, having moved there at the family's request because he was homosexual; but he rejects that assertion. It is extremely likely that this wasn't at all true, as there is no evidence to suggest that Le Prince was gay.

=== Fratricide, murder for money ===
In 1967, Jean Mitry proposed, in Histoire du cinéma, that Le Prince was killed. Mitry notes that if Le Prince truly wanted to disappear, he could have done so at any time prior to that. Thus, he most likely never boarded the train in Dijon. He also wonders why his brother, who was the last person to have seen Le Prince alive and knew Le Prince was suicidal, didn't try to stop Le Prince, and why he didn't report Le Prince's mental state to the police before it was too late.

=== Suspected drowning ===
A photograph of a drowned man pulled from the Seine in 1890, strongly resembling Le Prince, was discovered in 2003 during research in the Paris police archives. This led to the theory that he had failed to get his moving picture to work, had heavy debts, and thus chose to take his own life. However, it has been claimed that the body was too short to be Le Prince.

== Patents and cameras ==
On 10 January 1888, Le Prince was granted an American patent on a 16-lens device that he claimed could serve as both motion picture camera (which he termed "the receiver or photo-camera") and a projector (which he called "the deliverer or stereopticon"). That same day he took out a near-identical provisional patent for the same devices in Great Britain, proposing "a system of preferably 3, 4, 8, 9, 16 or more lenses". Shortly before the final version was submitted he added a sentence which described a single-lens system, but this was neither fully explained nor illustrated, unlike the several pages of description of the multi-lens system, meaning the single-lens camera was not legally covered by patent.

This addendum was submitted on 10 October 1888 and, on 14 October, Le Prince used his single-lens camera to film Roundhay Garden Scene. During the period 1889–1890 he worked with the mechanic James Longley on various "deliverers" (projectors) with one, two, three and sixteen lenses. The images were to be separated, printed and mounted individually, sometimes on a flexible band, moved by metal eyelets.

The single lens projector used individual pictures mounted in wooden frames. His assistant, James Longley, claimed the three-lens version was the most successful. Those close to Le Prince have testified to him projecting his first films in his workshop as tests, but they were never presented to anyone outside his immediate circle of family and associates and the nature of the projector is unknown.

In 1889, he took French-American dual citizenship in order to establish himself with his family in New York City and to follow up his research. However, he was never able to perform his planned public exhibition at the Morris–Jumel Mansion in Manhattan, in September 1890, due to his disappearance.

== Later recognition ==
Even though Le Prince's achievement is remarkable, with only William Friese-Greene and Wordsworth Donisthorpe achieving anything comparable in the period 1888–1890, his work was largely forgotten until the 1920s, as he disappeared before the first public demonstration of the result of his work, having never shown his invention to any photographic society or scientific institution or the general public.

For the April 1894 commercial exploitation of his personal kinetoscope parlor, Thomas Edison is credited in the US as the inventor of cinema, while in France, the Lumière Brothers are hailed as inventors of the Cinématographe device and for the first commercial exhibition of motion-picture films, in Paris in 1895.

However, in Leeds, Le Prince is celebrated as a local hero. On 12 December 1930, the Lord Mayor of Leeds unveiled a bronze memorial tablet at 160 Woodhouse Lane, Le Prince's former workshop. In 2003, the University of Leeds's Centre for Cinema, Photography and Television was named in his honour. Le Prince's workshop in Woodhouse Lane was until recently the site of the BBC in Leeds, and is now part of the Leeds Beckett University Broadcasting Place complex, where a blue plaque commemorates his work. (coordinates: 53°48′20.58″N 1°32′56.74″W). Reconstructions of his film strips are shown in the cinema of the Armley Mills Industrial Museum, Leeds.

In France, an appreciation society was created as L'Association des Amis de Le Prince (Association of Le Prince's Friends), which still exists in Lyon.

In 1990, Christopher Rawlence wrote The Missing Reel, The Untold Story of the Lost inventor of Moving Pictures and produced the TV programme The Missing Reel (1989) for Channel Four, a dramatised feature on the life of Le Prince.

In 1992, the Japanese filmmaker Mamoru Oshii directed Talking Head, an avant-garde feature film paying tribute to the tragic endings of early cinematography figures such as George Eastman, Georges Méliès and Louis Le Prince who is credited as "the true inventor of eiga", 映画, Japanese for "motion picture film".

In 2013, a feature documentary, The First Film was produced, with new research material and documentation on the life of Le Prince and his patents. Produced and directed by Leeds-born David Nicholas Wilkinson with research by Irfan Shah, it was filmed in England, France and the United States by Guerilla Films. The First Film features several film historians to tell the story, including Michael Harvey, Irfan Shah, Stephen Herbert, Mark Rance, Daniel Martin, Jacques Pfend, Adrian Wootton, Tony North, Mick McCann, Tony Earnshaw, Carol S Ward, Liz Rymer, and twice Oscar-nominated cinematographer Tony Pierce-Roberts.

Le Prince's great-great-granddaughter Laurie Snyder also makes an appearance. It had its world première in June 2015 at the Edinburgh Film Festival and opened in UK cinemas on 3 July 2015. The film also played in festivals in the US, Canada, Russia, Ireland and Belgium. On 8 September 2016 it played at the Morris-Jumel Mansion in New York, where 126 years earlier Le Prince planned to show his films.

In 2019, researcher Irfan Shah announced the possibility of three more sequences shot by Le Prince. Nothing of the sequences are known to have survived but Shah states that the sequences may have been of a train in Holbeck (Leeds); a white horse in Roundhay; and a panorama scene. The idea of the White Horse sequence was first presented to the public by Shah in a talk given at the Leeds International Film Festival in 2017, and discussed in Stephen Herbert's Muyblog website.

In 2023, the Roundhay Garden Scene was shown and recreated for the grand finale of the 10th Annual Live On Cinema Oscar Special.

=== Types of Le Prince cine camera-projectors ===
Design	Model	Specs	Manufacture	Patents
1886, New York	16-lens camera and projector	Patent: "Method of and apparatus for producing animated pictures of natural scenery and life" (USA) and in all later foreign patents. Designation: LePrince 16-lens camera/projector Framerate: 16 frames per second (according to patent); Medium: Glass plates and Eastman paper film	Made in Paris, 1887	US Patent No. 376,247/217,809; Issued (United States) Washington; 2 November 1886; Accepted; 10 January 1888; FR Patent No. 188,089; Issued (France) Paris; 11 January 1888; Accepted; June 1890 (and BR patent 423 – see below)
Leeds, 1888	Single-lens camera	Patent: Mentioned but not described or illustrated in "Improvements in the Method of and Apparatus for Producing Animated Photographic Pictures"; Designation: Le Prince single-lens "receiver" (camera) Mk2; Framerate: 5–7 frames per second Lenses: Viewfinder (upper) & Photograph (lower); Film: sensitised paper film & gelatin stripping film (60mm); Focus: lever (backward/forward)	Made in Leeds, 1888: Frederic Mason (body and wooden parts); James William Longley (design and working parts)	BR patent no. 423; Issued (United Kingdom) London; 10 January 1888; Accepted; 16 November 1888 [Mentioned but not described]
Leeds, 1889	Single-lens projector	Single-lens "deliverer" (projector). Each frame was printed on glass and mounted in a mahogany frame. These were moved before the lens in a continuous spiral. The heat of the lamp and the movement of the frames often caused the glass to break. Top framerate: 7fps.	Made in Leeds, 1889	Never patented
Leeds, 1889 or 1890	Three-lens projector	Three-lens "deliverer" (projector), used frames mounted individually in three flexible strips of Willesden paper with brass eyelets to move them. Projection presumably alternated 1-2-3 between the three strips/lenses and each strip moved when the light was cut off.	Made in Leeds 1889 or 1890	Never patented

== Legacy ==
=== Remaining material and production ===
Back view of Le Prince's single-lens Cine Camera-Projector MkII opened (Science Museum, London, 1930).

Le Prince developed a single-lens camera in his workshop at 160 Woodhouse Lane, Leeds, which was used to shoot his motion-picture films. Remaining surviving production consists of two scenes in the garden at Oakwood Grange (his wife's family home, in Roundhay) and another of Leeds Bridge.

Forty years later, Le Prince's daughter, Marie, gave the remaining apparatus to the Science Museum, London (later transferred to the National Museum of Photography, Film and Television (NMPFT), Bradford, which opened in 1983 and is now the National Science and Media Museum). In May 1931, photographic plates were produced by workers of the Science Museum from paper print copies provided by Marie Le Prince.

In 1999, these were re-animated to produce digital versions. Roundhay Garden was alleged by the Le Prince family to have been shot at 12 frame/s and Leeds Bridge at 20 frame/s, although this is not borne out by the NMPFT versions (see below) or motion analysis, with both films being estimated at a consistent seven frames a second.

All available versions of these sequences are derived from materials held by the National Science and Media Museum.

=== Man Walking Around a Corner ===
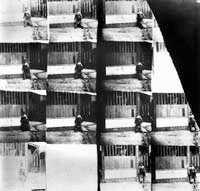
Sequence of 12 complete frames + 4 partial frames, from National Science Museum, London circa 1931. (Courtesy NMPFT, Bradford) NMPFT. Filmed in Paris before 18.08.1887.

The entire film animated

The only existing images from Le Prince's 16-lens camera are a sequence of 16 frames of a man walking around a corner. This appears to have been shot onto a single glass plate (which has since broken), rather than the twin strips of Eastman paper film envisaged in his patent. Jacques Pfend, a French cinema-historian and Le Prince specialist, confirms that these images were shot in Paris, at the corner of Rue Bochart-de-Saron (where Le Prince was living) and Avenue Trudaine. Le Prince sent 8 images of his mechanic running (which may be from this sequence) to his wife in New York City in a letter dated 18 August 1887, which suggests it represented a significant camera test. Exposure is very irregular from lens to lens with some of the images almost completely bleached out, which Le Prince later on fixed.

=== Roundhay Garden Scene ===
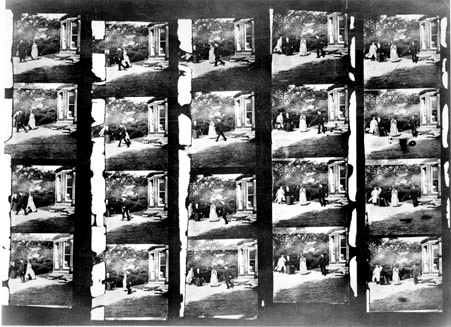
Roundhay, 1888 original 20 frames by National Science Museum, London 1931 (Courtesy of NMPFT, Bradford).

Animation of Roundhay frames, 7fps.

The 1931 National Science Museum copy of what remains of a sequence shot in Roundhay Garden features 20 frames. The frames appear to have been printed in reverse from the negative, but this is corrected in the video. The film's damaged edge results in distortion and deformation on the right side of the stabilised digital movie. The scene was shot in Le Prince's father-in-law's garden at Oakwood Grange, Roundhay on 14 October 1888. It was recorded with Le Prince's single-Lens Camera MkII. The NMPFT animation lasts two seconds at 24fps (frames per second), meaning the original footage is playing at 10fps. In this version, the action is speeded up – the original footage was probably shot at 7fps.

=== Traffic Crossing Leeds Bridge ===
Video clip, 2 seconds

Louis Le Prince filmed traffic crossing Leeds Bridge from Hicks the Ironmongers at the following coordinates: 53°47′37.70″N 1°32′29.18″W.

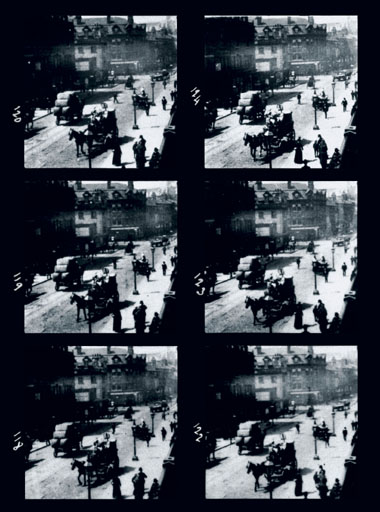
6-frame sequence (118–120 & 122–124) of Leeds Bridge (National Science Museum, London 1923)

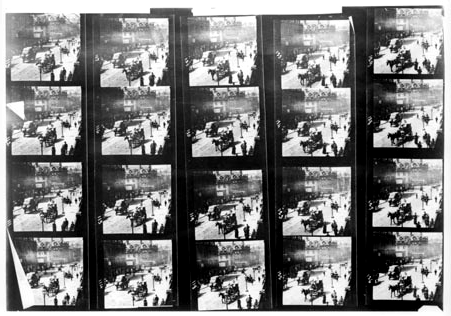
20-frame sequence of Leeds Bridge (National Science Museum)(Courtesy NMPFT, Bradford)

The earliest copy belongs to the 1923 NMPFT inventory (frames 118–120 and 122–124), though this longer sequence comes from the 1931 inventory (frames 110–129). According to Adolphe Le Prince who assisted his father when this film was shot in late October 1888, it was taken at 20fps, using his single-lens camera. However, the digitally stabilised sequence produced by the NMPFT lasts two seconds, meaning the footage is playing here at 10fps. As with the Roundhay Garden sequence, its appearance is sped up, suggesting the original footage was probably shot at 7fps. This would fit with what we know of the projection experiments, where James Longley reported a top speed of 7fps.

=== Accordion Player ===
Amateur remastering

The last remaining film of Le Prince's single-lens camera is a sequence of frames of Adolphe Le Prince playing a diatonic button accordion. It was recorded on the steps of the house of Joseph Whitley, Louis's father-in-law. The recording date may be the same as Roundhay Garden as the camera is in a similar position and Adolphe is dressed the same. The NMPFT has not remastered this film.

== Personal life ==
Le Prince was a Freemason, initiated into the Lodge of Fidelity No. 289 in Leeds in 1876, he later demitted in 1880.

== Filmography ==
Film
Year	Title	Director	Editor	Producer	Cinematographer
1887	Man Walking Around a Corner	Yes	No	Yes	Yes
1888	Roundhay Garden Scene	Yes	Yes	Yes	Yes
1888	Traffic Crossing Leeds Bridge	Yes	No	No	Yes
1888	Accordion Player	Yes	No	No	Yes

Archive footage
Year	Title	Role	Notes
2015	The First Film	—N/a	Posthumous release

== See also ==
- List of people who disappeared mysteriously (pre-1910)

== Sources ==
- Insight Collections and Research Centre
- The Career of Louis Aimée Augustin Le Prince by E. Kilburn Scott (July 1931)
- La naissance du cinéma : cent sept ans et un crime..." by Irénée Dembowski (in Kino 1989, translated from Polish to French in Cahiers de l'AFIS, numéro 182, nov.–déc. by Michel Rouzé, quoted by Alliage numéro 22 1995)
- "Le Prince's Early Film Cameras", by Simon Popple (in Photographica World, September 1993)
- "Le Prince and the Lumières", by Rod Varley (in Making of the Modern World, Science Museum, UK, 1992)
- "Career of Louis Aimée Augustin Le Prince", by E. Kilburn Scott, (in Journal of the Society of Motion Picture Engineers, US, July 1931)
- "The Pioneer Work of Le Prince in Kinematography", by E. Kilburn Scott (in The Photographic Journal #63, August 1923, pp. 373–378)
- "Louis Aimée Augustin Le Prince" by Merritt Crawford (in Cinema, 1 December 1930, pp. 28–31)
- L'affaire Lumière. Du mythe à l'histoire, enquête sur les origines du cinéma by Léo Sauvage, 1985 ISBN 2-86244-045-0
- Le Prince 16-lens camera - ingenious.org.uk
- "Louis Le Prince: the body of evidence" by Richard Howells (in Screen vol.47 #2, Oxford University Press, 2006)
- Jean-Jacques Aulas et Jacques Pfend, "Le Prince, inventeur et artiste, précurseur du cinema" (in Revue d'Histoire du Cinéma N°32, December 2000, p. 9) ISSN 0769-0959
- Jean-Jacques Aulas et Jacques Pfend, Louis Aimé Augustin Leprince, inventeur et artiste, précurseur du cinéma - 1895.revues.org
- New research centre honours father of film
- Essential Films, chapter 2, Culture Wars by Ion Martea
- Roundhay Garden Scene (1888), Culture Wars by Ion Martea
- Traffic Crossing Leeds Bridge (1888), Culture Wars by Ion Martea
- The Indispensable Murder Book, edited by Joseph Henry Jackson (New York: The Book Society, 1951), pp. 437–464, "The Red and White Girdle" by Christopher Morley. This deals with the murder of Gouffe, and shows the intense study of that trunk murder in 1889–90.
- The facts concerning the life and death of LOUIS AIME AUGUSTIN LEPRINCE, pioneer of the moving pîcture and his family, by Jacques Pfend (Sarreguemines/57200/France) 2014.ISBN 9782954244198.
- Louis Aimé Augustin Leprince: la vita e il contributo tecnico-scientifico nel contesto della corsa all’invenzione del cinematografo [Louis Aimé Augustin Leprince: his life and technical-scientific contribution in the context of the race to the cinema], by Federico Striuli, Inter-university PhD program Ca' Foscari University, Venice – IUAV University, Venice, 2015 (in Italian).
- The Man Who Invented Motion Pictures: A True Tale of Obsession, Murder and the Movies, by Paul Fischer (Faber & Faber, 2022) ISBN 978-0-571-34864-0
