= Roundhay Garden Scene =

1888 short film

Coordinates: 53°49′32″N 1°29′44″W

- Directed by: Louis Le Prince
- Starring: Annie Hartley; Adolphe Le Prince; Joseph Whitley; Sarah Whitley
- Cinematography: Louis Le Prince
- Release date: 14 October 1888
- Running time: 2.11 seconds
- Country: United Kingdom
- Language: Silent

Roundhay Garden Scene (French: Une scène au jardin de Roundhay) is a short silent motion picture filmed by French inventor Louis Le Prince at Oakwood Grange in Roundhay, Leeds, in Yorkshire, England on 14 October 1888. It is believed to be the oldest surviving film. The camera used was patented in the United Kingdom on 16 November 1888.

== Cast ==
- Annie Hartley (credited as Harriet Hartley; 1873 – 31 March 1898)
- Adolphe Le Prince (c. June 1872 – 20 August 1901)
- Joseph Whitley (17 October 1816 – 12 January 1891)
- Sarah Whitley (c. 1816 – 24 October 1888)

== Overview ==
According to Le Prince's son, Adolphe, Roundhay Garden Scene was made at Oakwood Grange, the home of Joseph and Sarah Whitley, in Roundhay, Leeds, West Riding of Yorkshire, on 14 October 1888. The footage features Adolphe, the Whitleys, and Annie Hartley leisurely walking around the garden of Oakwood Grange. Sarah is seen walking – or dancing – backward as she turns around, and Joseph's coattails fly as he turns also. Joseph (1816–1891) and Sarah (née Robinson, 1816–1888) were the parents of Elizabeth, Louis Le Prince's wife, and Hartley is believed to have been a friend of the Le Princes. Sarah Whitley died ten days after the scene was filmed.

Oakwood Grange was demolished in 1972 and replaced with modern housing; the only remnants of it are the garden walls at the end of Oakwood Grange Lane. The adjacent stately home, Oakwood Hall, still stands, and is now a nursing home.

== Preservation ==
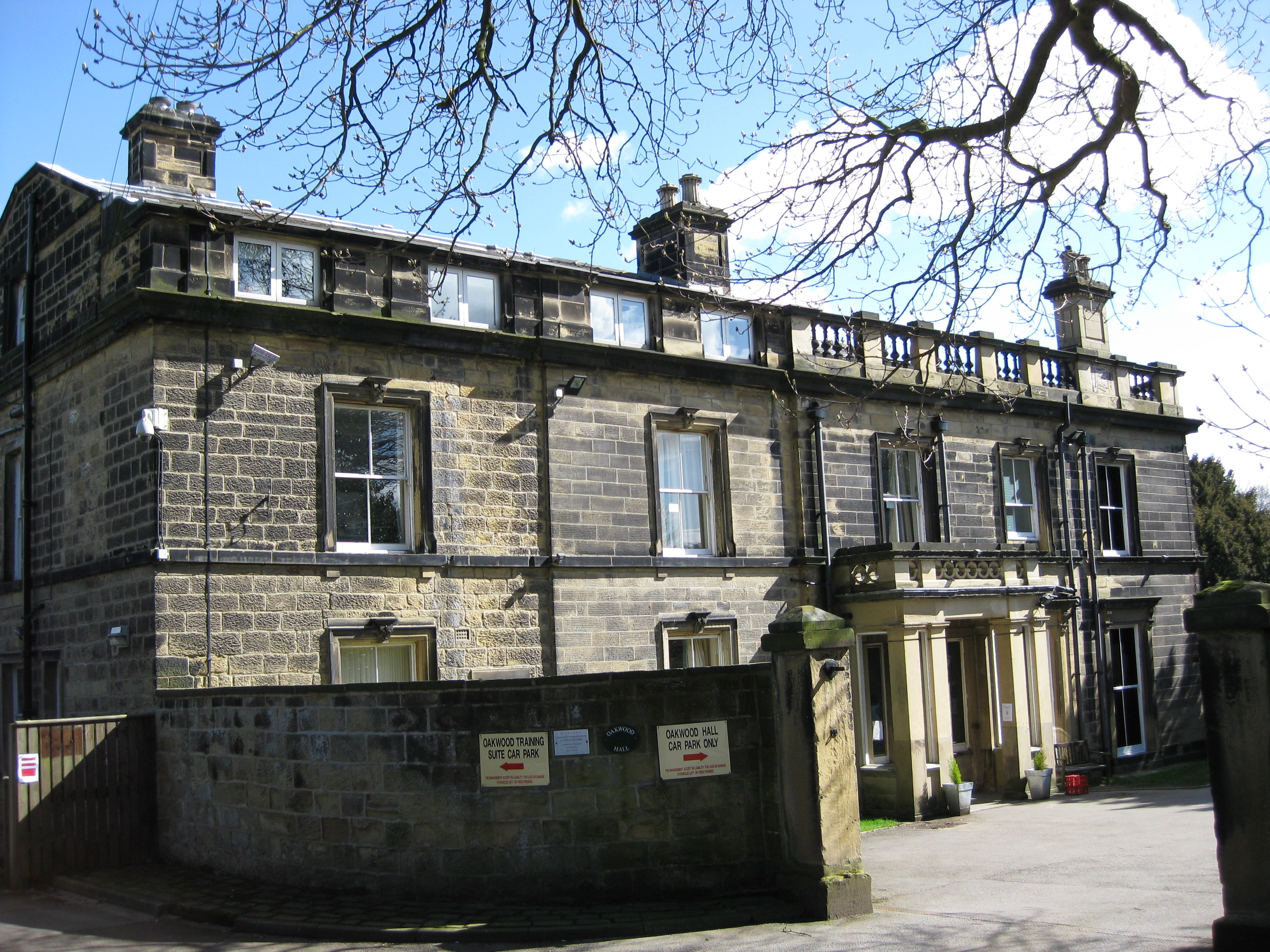
Oakwood Hall is near the filming site of Roundhay Garden Scene

Roundhay Garden Scene was recorded on Eastman Kodak paper base photographic film using Le Prince's single-lens camera. In the 1930s, the Science Museum in London produced a photographic glass plate copy of 20 surviving frames from the original negative before it was lost. The copied frames were later printed on 35 mm film. Adolphe Le Prince stated that the film was shot at 12 frames per second (fps), but analysis suggests that it was shot at 7 fps. The First Film, a 2015 documentary about Louis Le Prince, shows it at 7 fps.

== See also ==
- Passage de Vénus, an 1874 series of photographs often considered to be the first film
