= 1888 =

1888 in various calendars
- Gregorian calendar: 1888; MDCCCLXXXVIII
- Ab urbe condita: 2641
- Armenian calendar: 1337; ԹՎ ՌՅԼԷ
- Assyrian calendar: 6638
- Baháʼí calendar: 44–45
- Balinese saka calendar: 1809–1810
- Bengali calendar: 1294–1295
- Berber calendar: 2838
- British Regnal year: 51 Vict. 1 – 52 Vict. 1
- Buddhist calendar: 2432
- Burmese calendar: 1250
- Byzantine calendar: 7396–7397
- Chinese calendar: 丁亥年 (Fire Pig); 4585 or 4378 — to — 戊子年 (Earth Rat); 4586 or 4379
- Coptic calendar: 1604–1605
- Discordian calendar: 3054
- Ethiopian calendar: 1880–1881
- Hebrew calendar: 5648–5649
- Hindu calendars
- Vikram Samvat: 1944–1945
- Shaka Samvat: 1809–1810
- Kali Yuga: 4988–4989
- Holocene calendar: 11888
- Igbo calendar: 888–889
- Iranian calendar: 1266–1267
- Islamic calendar: 1305–1306
- Japanese calendar: Meiji 21 (明治２１年)
- Javanese calendar: 1817–1818
- Julian calendar: Gregorian minus 12 days
- Korean calendar: 4221
- Minguo calendar: 24 before ROC 民前24年
- Nanakshahi calendar: 420
- Thai solar calendar: 2430–2431
- Tibetan calendar: མེ་མོ་ཕག་ལོ་ (female Fire-Boar); 2014 or 1633 or 861 — to — ས་ཕོ་བྱི་བ་ལོ་ (male Earth-Rat); 2015 or 1634 or 862

1888 (MDCCCLXXXVIII) was a leap year starting on Sunday of the Gregorian calendar and a leap year starting on Friday of the Julian calendar, the 1888th year of the Common Era (CE) and Anno Domini (AD) designations, the 888th year of the 2nd millennium, the 88th year of the 19th century, and the 9th year of the 1880s decade. As of the start of 1888, the Gregorian calendar was 12 days ahead of the Julian calendar, which remained in localized use until 1923.

== Events ==
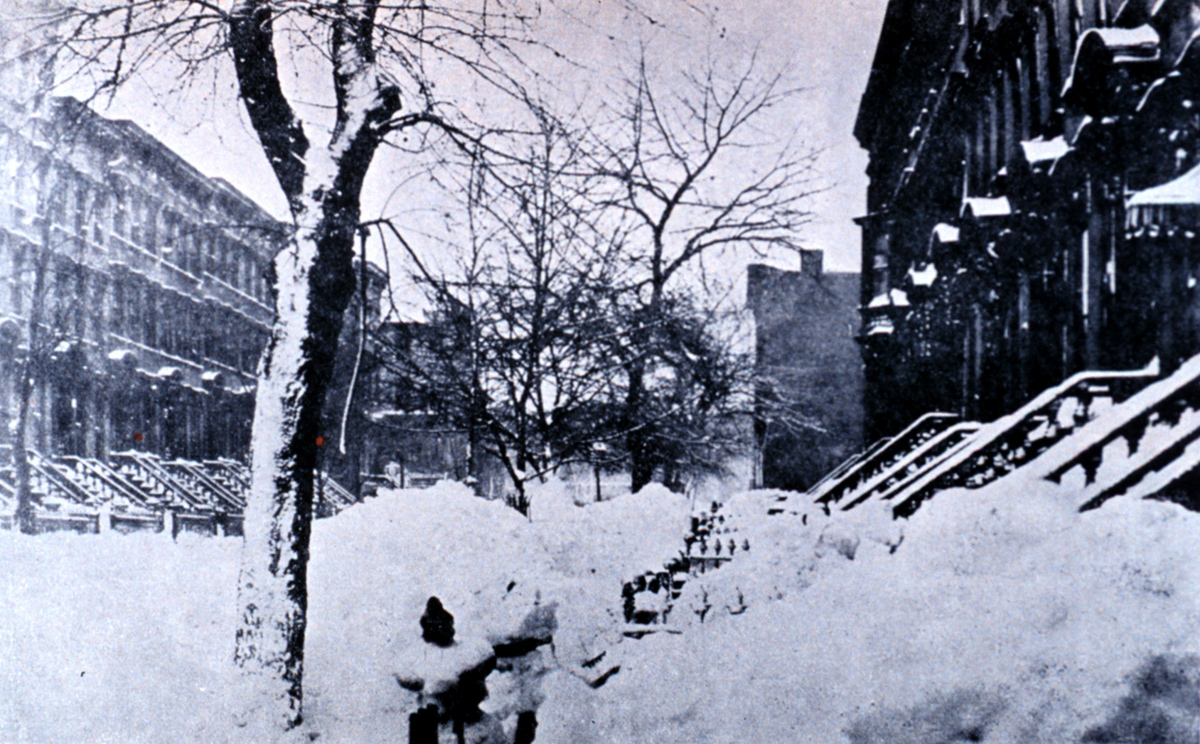
March 11: Great Blizzard of 1888.

=== January ===
- January 3 – The great telescope (with an objective lens of 91 cm (36 in) diameter) at Lick Observatory in California is first used.
- January 12 – The Schoolhouse Blizzard hits Dakota Territory and the states of Montana, Minnesota, Nebraska, Kansas and Texas, leaving 235 dead, many of them children on their way home from school.
- January 13 – The National Geographic Society is founded in Washington, D.C.
- January 19 – The Battle of the Grapevine Creek, the last major conflict of the Hatfield–McCoy feud in the Southeastern United States.
- January 21 – The Amateur Athletic Union is founded by William Buckingham Curtis in the United States.
- January 26 – The Lawn Tennis Association is founded in England.

=== February ===
- February 20 – The Croatian sailing ship Kostrena, sailing from Cette to Rijeka, ran aground in the Bobina bay on the Istrian side of the Vela vrata strait because of bad weather; the same happened to another Croatian sailing ship, the Ireneo.
- February 27 – In West Orange, New Jersey, Thomas Edison meets with Eadweard Muybridge, who proposes a scheme for sound film.

=== March ===
- March 1 - Queensland's Western Railway Line reaches Charleville.
- March 8 – The Agriculture College of Utah (later Utah State University) is founded in Logan, Utah.
- March 9
  - Year of the Three Emperors in Germany: Wilhelm I dies aged 90 and is succeeded as German Emperor and King of Prussia by his son, the terminally ill Frederick III.
  - 1888 British Lions tour to New Zealand and Australia: The "English Footballers" embark for the first British rugby union tour of Australasia.
- March 11 – The Great Blizzard of 1888 begins along the East Coast of the United States, shutting down commerce and killing more than 400.
- March 13 – Ritter Island eruption and tsunami: The summit of Ritter Island off the coast of New Guinea collapses, resulting in a tsunami and the deaths of an estimated 500 to 3,500 people.
- March 13 – The De Beers diamond mining conglomerate is founded by Cecil Rhodes in Kimberley, Northern Cape (South Africa).
- March 15 – The Sikkim Expedition, a British military expedition to expel the Tibetans from northern Sikkim, begins.
- March 16 – The foundation stone for a new National Library of Greece is laid in Athens.
- March 20 – The first Romani language operetta premieres in Moscow, Russia.
- March 23 – A meeting called by William McGregor to discuss establishment of The Football League is held in London.
- March 25 – Opening of an international Congress for Women's Rights organized by Susan B. Anthony in Washington, D.C., leading to formation of the International Council of Women, a key event in the international women's movement.

=== April ===
- April 3
  - London prostitute Emma Elizabeth Smith is brutally attacked by two or three men, dying of her injuries the following day, first of the Whitechapel murders, but probably not a victim of Jack the Ripper.
  - The Brighton Beach Hotel in Coney Island (New York) is moved 520 ft (160 m), using six steam locomotives, by civil engineer B. C. Miller, to save it from ocean storms.
- April 6 – The first New Year's Day is observed, of the solar calendar adopted by Siamese King Chulalongkorn, with the 106th anniversary of Bangkok's founding in 1782 as its epoch (reference date).
- April 11 – The Concertgebouw orchestra in Amsterdam is inaugurated.
- April 13 – Kahisakan (可否茶館), the first coffee shop in Japan, opens in Tokyo.
- April 16 – The German Empire annexes the island of Nauru.
- April 18 – Westminster School is founded in Simsbury, Connecticut.
- April 21 – The Texas State Capitol building, completed at a cost of $3 million, opens to the public in Austin.

=== May ===
- May 1 – Fort Belknap Indian Reservation is established by the United States Congress.
- May 8 – The International Exhibition of Science, Art and Industry in Kelvingrove Park, Glasgow opens (continues to November).
- May 10 – Nippon Oil Corporation, predecessor of Eneos, a petroleum and gas energy brand in Japan, is founded in Niigata Prefecture.
- May 12 – The North Borneo Chartered Company's territories (including Sabah) become the British protectorate of North Borneo.
- May 13 – In Brazil, the Lei Áurea abolishes the last remnants of slavery.
- May 26 – The comic novel The Diary of a Nobody by brothers George and Weedon Grossmith begins serialization in Punch (London).
- May 28 – In Glasgow (Scotland), Celtic F.C. plays its first official match, winning 5–2 against Rangers F.C.
- May 30 – Hong Kong's Peak Tram begins operation.

=== June ===
- June 2 – Edward King (bishop of Lincoln) in England is called to account for using ritualistic practices in Anglican worship.
- June 3
  - The Kingdom of Sedang is formed, in modern-day Vietnam.
  - American writer Ernest Thayer's baseball poem "Casey at the Bat" is first published (under the pen name "Phin") as the last of his humorous contributions to The San Francisco Examiner.
- June 14 – The White Rajahs territories become the British protectorate of Sarawak.
- June 15 – Year of the Three Emperors in Germany: Frederick III dies after ruling for 99 days and is succeeded as German Emperor and King of Prussia by his son, Wilhelm II, who will reign until his abdication in 1918.
- June 19 – In Chicago, the Republican Convention opens at the Auditorium Building. Benjamin Harrison and Levi P. Morton win the nominations for President and Vice President of the United States, respectively.
- June 29 – Handel's Israel in Egypt is recorded onto wax cylinder at The Crystal Palace in London, the earliest known recording of classical music.
- June 30 – The Marine Biological Association of the United Kingdom opens its laboratory, on Plymouth Hoe.

=== July ===
- July 2–27 – London matchgirls strike of 1888: About 200 workers, mainly teenaged girls, strike following the dismissal of three colleagues from the Bryant and May match factory, precipitated by an article on their working conditions published on June 23 by campaigning journalist Annie Besant, and the workers unionise on July 27.
- July 11 – Over 200 miners are killed in an accident at a diamond mine in Kimberley, Northern Cape (South Africa).
- July 15 – Eruption of Mount Bandai: An explosive eruption of the stratovolcano Mount Bandai in the Fukushima Prefecture of Japan results in pyroclastic flows and the deaths of at least 477 people (according to Japanese government sources).
- July 25 – Frank E. McGurrin, a court stenographer from Salt Lake City, Utah, purportedly the only person using touch typing at this time, wins a decisive victory over Louis Traub in a typing contest held in Cincinnati, Ohio. This date can be called the birthday of the touch typing method that is widely used in modern times.

=== August ===
- August 1 – Carl Benz is issued with the world's first driving licence by the Grand Duchy of Baden.
- August 5 – Bertha Benz arrives in Pforzheim having driven 40 miles (64 km) from Mannheim in a car manufactured by her husband Carl Benz, thus completing the first "long-distance" drive in the history of the automobile.
- August 7 – Whitechapel murders: The body of London prostitute Martha Tabram is found, a possible victim of Jack the Ripper.
- August 9
  - A fire destroys the Main Building, the heart of Wells College in Aurora, New York, causing a loss of $130,000.
  - The Oaths Act permits the oath of allegiance taken to the Sovereign by Members of Parliament (MPs) to be affirmed, rather than sworn to God, thus confirming the ability of atheists to sit in the House of Commons of the United Kingdom.
- August 10 – Dr Friedrich Hermann Wölfert’s motorised airship successfully completes the world’s first engine-driven flight, from Cannstatt to Kornwestheim in Germany.
- August 13 – The Local Government Act, effective from 1889, establishes county councils and county borough councils in England and Wales, redraws some county boundaries, and gives women the vote in local elections. It also declares that "bicycles, tricycles, velocipedes, and other similar machines" be carriages within the meaning of the Highway Acts (which remains the case), and requires that they give audible warning when overtaking "any cart or carriage, or any horse, mule, or other beast of burden, or any foot passenger", a rule abolished in 1930.
- August 20 – A mutiny at Dufile, Equatoria, results in the imprisonment of the Emin Pasha.
- August 22 – Earliest evidence of a death and injury by a meteorite, in Sulaymaniyah, Iraq.
- August 24 –The first trams in Tallinn (Reval), horsecars, begin operation.
- August 28 – The longest date in roman numerals is achieved, as "VIII-XXVIII-MDCCCLXXXVIII". In contrast, the shortest date (I-I-MM) will be achieved 111 years later on January 1, 2000.
- August 31 – Whitechapel murders: The mutilated body of London prostitute Mary Ann Nichols is found; she is considered the first victim of Jack the Ripper.

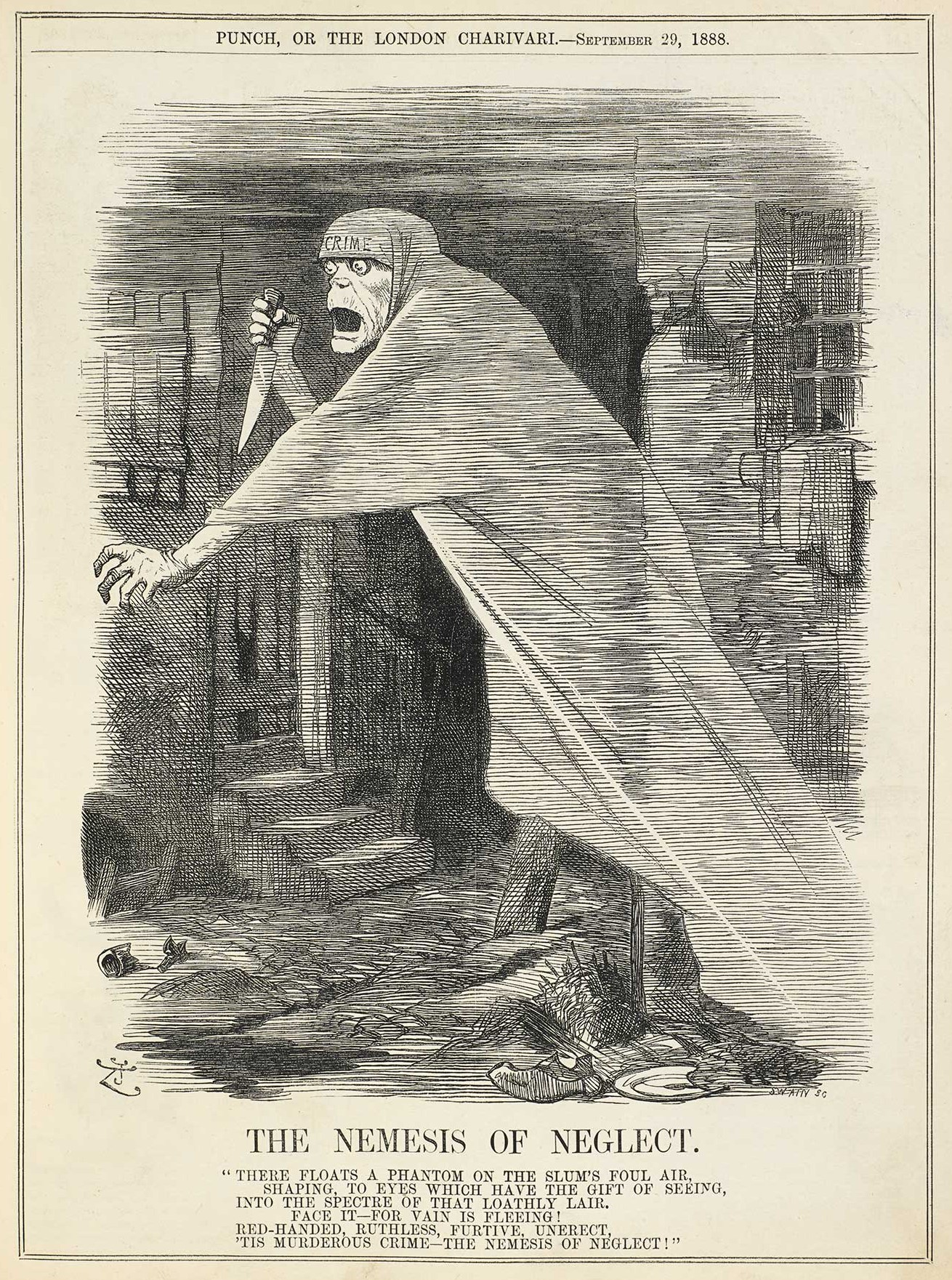
August 31: Victim found from Jack the Ripper?

=== September ===
- September 4
  - In the United States, George Eastman registers the trademark Kodak, and receives a patent for his camera, which uses roll film.
  - Mohandas Gandhi embarks on the SS Clyde from Bombay for London.
- September 6 – Australian cricketer Charles Turner becomes the first bowler to take 250 wickets in an English season – a feat since accomplished only by Tom Richardson (twice), J. T. Hearne, Wilfred Rhodes (twice) and Tich Freeman (six times).
- September 8
  - Patagonian sheep farming boom: The Great Herding (Spanish: El Gran Arreo) begins with thousands of sheep being herded from the Argentine outpost of Fortín Conesa to Santa Cruz near the Strait of Magellan.
  - Whitechapel murders: The mutilated body of London prostitute Annie Chapman is found (considered to be the second victim of Jack the Ripper).
  - In England, the first six Football League matches are played.
  - In a letter accepting renomination as President of the United States, Grover Cleveland declares the Chinese "impossible of assimilation with our people and dangerous to our peace and welfare".
- September 17 – Las Cruces College (later New Mexico State University) is founded in Las Cruces, New Mexico.
- September 27
  - Whitechapel murders: The 'Dear Boss letter' signed "Jack the Ripper", the first time the name is used, is received by London's Central News Agency.
  - Stanley Park is officially opened by Vancouver (B.C.) mayor David Oppenheimer.
- September 30 – Whitechapel murders: The bodies of London prostitutes Elizabeth Stride and Catherine Eddowes, the latter mutilated, are found. They are generally considered Jack the Ripper's third and fourth victims, respectively.

=== October ===
- October 1 – Sofia University officially opens, becoming the first university in liberated Bulgaria.
- October 2 – The Whitehall Mystery: Dismembered remains of a woman's body are discovered at three central London locations, one being the construction site of the police headquarters at New Scotland Yard.
- October 9 – The Washington Monument officially opens to the general public in Washington, D.C.
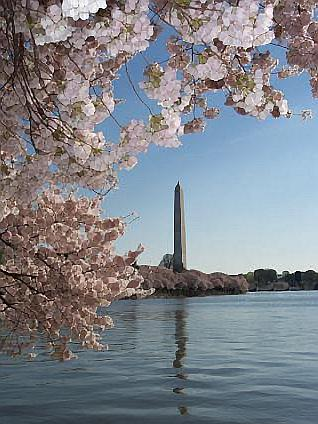
  October 9: Washington Monument opens.
- October 14
  - Louis Le Prince films the first motion picture: Roundhay Garden Scene in Roundhay, Leeds, West Yorkshire, England, two seconds and 18 frames in length (followed by his movie Leeds Bridge and Accordion Player).
  - Battle of Guté Dili: Seeking to extend Mahdist control over what is becomes southwestern Ethiopia, governor Khalil al-Khuzani is routed by an alliance of Shewan forces, under Ras Gobana Dacche and Moroda Bekere, ruler of Leqa Naqamte. Only a handful, including Khalil, barely manage to flee the battlefield.
- October 25 – St Cuthbert's Society at the University of Durham in England is founded, after a general meeting chaired by the Reverend Hastings Rashdall.
- October 30 – The Rudd Concession, a written concession for exclusive mining rights in Matabeleland, Mashonaland and adjoining territories, is granted by King Lobengula of Matabeleland to Charles Rudd, James Rochfort Maguire and Francis Thompson, who are acting on behalf of South African-based politician and businessman Cecil Rhodes, providing a basis for white settlement of Rhodesia.

=== November ===
- November 6 – 1888 United States presidential election: Democratic Party incumbent Grover Cleveland wins the popular vote, but loses the Electoral College vote to Republican challenger Benjamin Harrison, therefore losing the election.
- November 8 – Joseph Assheton Fincher files a patent in the United Kingdom for the parlour game which he calls "Tiddledy-Winks".
- November 9 – Whitechapel murders: The mutilated body of London prostitute Mary Jane Kelly is found. She is considered to be the fifth, and last, of Jack the Ripper's victims. A number of similar murders in England follow, but the police attribute them to copy-cat killers.
- November 16 – First signs of famine in Ethiopia, caused by drought combined with early spread of the 1890s African rinderpest epizootic.
- November 24 – The first Saint Verhaegen takes place in Brussels.
- November 27 – International sorority Delta Delta Delta is founded at Boston University in the United States.
- November 29 – The celebration of Thanksgiving (United States) and the first day of Hanukkah coincide.

=== December ===
- December 7 – John Boyd Dunlop patents the pneumatic bicycle tyre in the United Kingdom.
- December 17 – The Lyric Theatre, London opens.
- December 18 – Richard Wetherill and his brother-in-law, Charlie Mason, discover the Indian ruins of Mesa Verde in southwestern Colorado.
- December 23 – During a bout of mental illness (and having quarreled with his friend Paul Gauguin), Dutch painter Vincent van Gogh infamously cuts off the lower part of his own left ear, taking it to a brothel, and is removed to the local hospital in Arles in the south of France.

=== Date unknown ===
- The dolphin Pelorus Jack is first sighted in Cook Strait, New Zealand.
- John Robert Gregg first publishes Gregg shorthand in the United States.
- The Camborne School of Mines is founded in Cornwall, England.
- The Baldwin School is founded in Bryn Mawr, Pennsylvania, as "Miss [Florence] Baldwin's School for Girls, Preparatory for Bryn Mawr College".
- Letitia Alice Walkington becomes the first woman in the United Kingdom to receive a degree of Bachelor of Laws, from the Royal University of Ireland at Queen's College, Belfast.
- Global pharmaceutical and health care brands are founded in the United States:
  - G. D. Searle by Gideon Daniel Searle in Omaha, Nebraska.
  - Abbott Laboratories as Abbott Alkaloidal by Dr. Wallace C. Abbott in Illinois.
- Katz's Delicatessen is founded on the Lower East Side of Manhattan.
- In Poland, silver manufacturer Schiffers & Co. is founded in Warsaw.
- The Finnish epic Kalevala is published for the first time in the English language, by American linguist John Martin Crawford.

== Births ==
=== January–February ===
Carlos Quintanilla

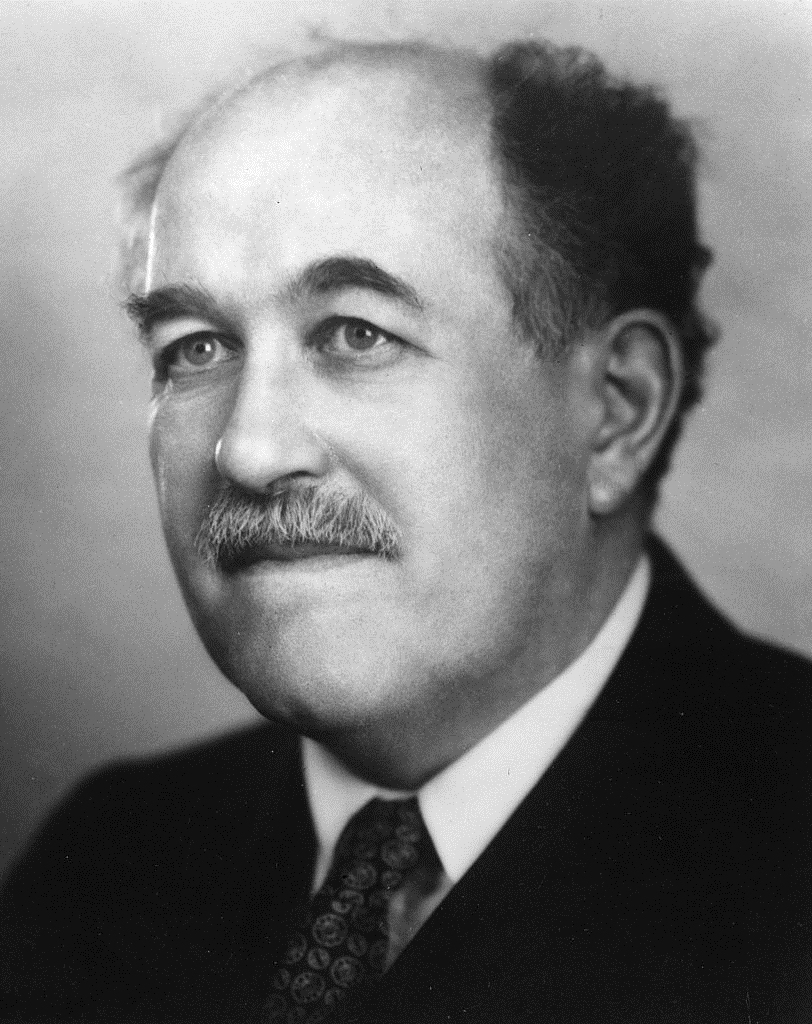
Otto Stern

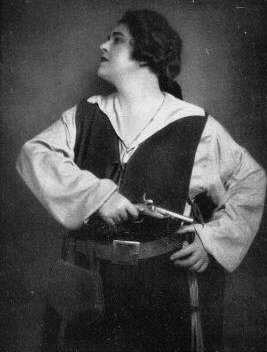
Lotte Lehmann

- January 1 – Victor Goldschmidt, Swiss geochemist (d. 1947)
- January 8 – Matt Moore, Irish-born American actor (d. 1960)
- January 18 – Thomas Sopwith, English aviation pioneer, yachtsman (d. 1989)
- January 19 – Millard Harmon, American general (d. 1945)
- January 20 – Lead Belly, American folk, blues singer (d. 1949)
- January 22 – Carlos Quintanilla, 37th President of Bolivia (d. 1964)
- January 23 – Aritomo Gotō, Japanese admiral (d. 1942)
- January 24
  - Vicki Baum, Austrian writer (d. 1960)
  - Ernst Heinkel, German aircraft designer (d. 1958)
- January 29 – Wellington Koo, Chinese statesman (d. 1985)
- February 2 – Frederick Lane, Australian swimmer (d. 1969)
- February 5 – Bruce Fraser, British admiral (d. 1981)
- February 6 – Nell W. Walker, American politician from West Virginia (d. 1962)
- February 8 – Edith Evans, British actress (d. 1976)
- February 11 – John Warren Davis, American educator, college administrator, and civil rights leader (d. 1980)
- February 13 – Georgios Papandreou, Prime Minister of Greece (d. 1968)
- February 14 – Chandrashekhar Agashe, Indian industrialist (d. 1956)
- February 17 – Otto Stern, German physicist, Nobel Prize laureate (d. 1969)
- February 19
  - Tom Phillips, British admiral (d. 1941)
  - Aurora Quezon, First Lady of the Philippines (d. 1949)
- February 20 – Georges Bernanos, French writer (d. 1948)
- February 25 – John Foster Dulles, United States Secretary of State (d. 1959)
- February 27
  - Lotte Lehmann, German singer (d. 1976)
  - Arthur Schlesinger Sr., American historian (d. 1965)

=== March–April ===
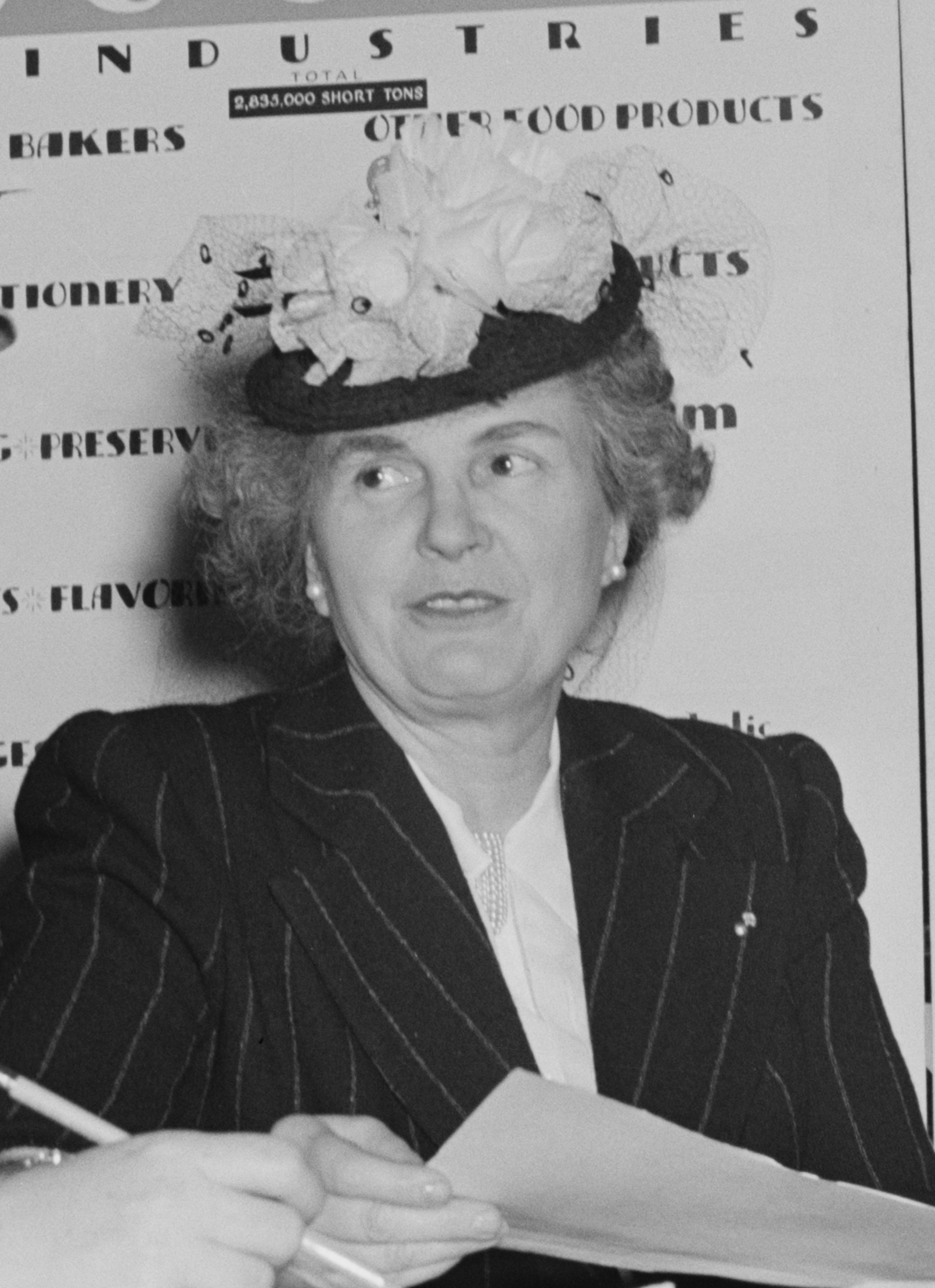
Ilo Wallace

- March 4 – Knute Rockne, American football player, coach (d. 1931)
- March 5 – Peg Leg Howell, American country blues singer-songwriter and guitarist (d. 1966)
- March 7 – William L. Laurence, American journalist (d. 1977)
- March 10
  - Barry Fitzgerald, Irish actor (d. 1961)
  - Ilo Wallace, Second Lady of the United States (d. 1981)
- March 17– Paul Ramadier, 63rd Prime Minister of France (d. 1961)
- March 18– Jerry Dawson, English footballer, Burnley and national team (d. 1970)
- March 25 – Timothy Detudamo, Nauruan Head Chief (d. 1953)
- March 26 – Elsa Brändström, Swedish nurse (d. 1948)
- March 29 – Enea Bossi Sr., Italian-born American aerospace engineer, aviation pioneer (d. 1963)
- March 30 – Anna Q. Nilsson, Swedish-American silent film star (d. 1974)
- April 1 – Terry de la Mesa Allen Sr., American general (d. 1969)
- April 2 – Sir Neville Cardus, British cricket, music writer (d. 1975)
- April 3 – Thomas C. Kinkaid, American admiral (d. 1972)
- April 4 – Tris Speaker, American professional baseball player, member of the Baseball Hall of Fame (d. 1958)
- April 6
  - Hans Richter, German artist and filmmaker (d. 1976)
  - Gerhard Ritter, German historian (d. 1967)
- April 12 – Carlos Julio Arosemena Tola, 28th president of Ecuador (d. 1952)
- April 18 – Duffy Lewis, American Major League Baseball player (d. 1979)
- April 26 – Anita Loos, American writer (d. 1981)
- April 27 – Florence La Badie, Canadian actress (d. 1917)

=== May–June ===
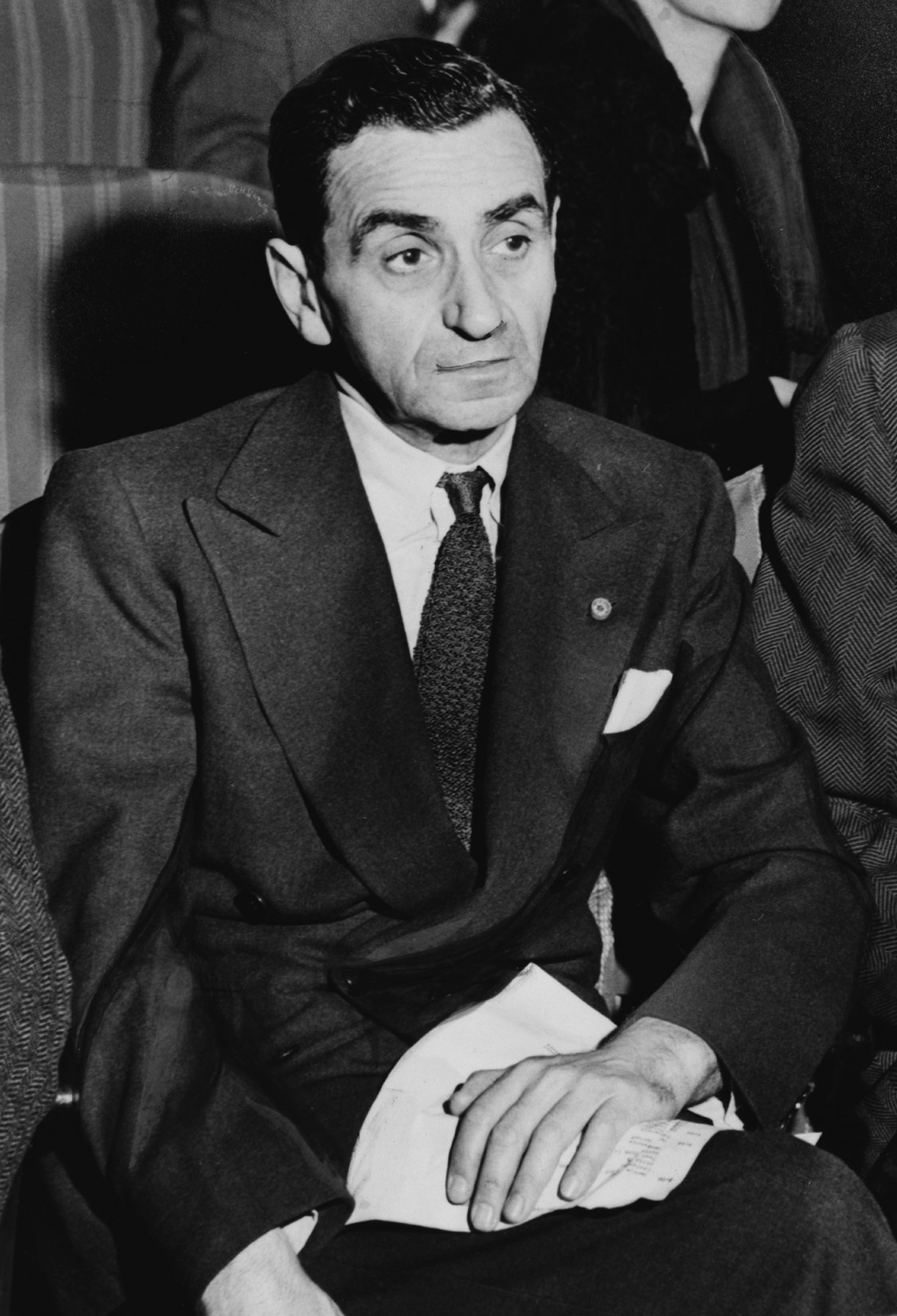
Irving Berlin

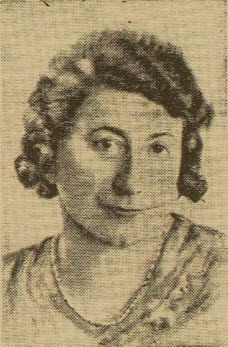
Lucie Randoin

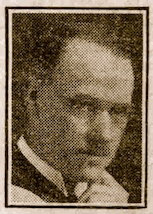
David Dougal Williams

- May 8 – Maurice Boyau, French World War I fighter ace (d. 1918)
- May 9 – Francesco Baracca, Italian World War I fighter ace (d. 1918)
- May 10 – Max Steiner, Austrian-American composer (d. 1971)
- May 11
  - Irving Berlin, American composer (d. 1989)
  - Willis Augustus Lee, American admiral (d. 1945)
  - Lucie Randoin, French biologist, nutritionist, expert in dietary significance of vitamins (d. 1960)
- May 13 – Inge Lehmann, Danish seismologist, geophysicist (d. 1993)
- May 17 – Tich Freeman, English cricketer (d. 1965)
- May 18 – William Hood Simpson, American general (d. 1980)
- May 23 – Zack Wheat, American Baseball Hall of Famer (d. 1972)
- May 25 – Miles Malleson, English actor (d. 1969)
- May 26 – Anne Azgapetian, Russian Red Cross worker (d. 1973)
- May 28 – Kaarel Eenpalu, 7th Prime Minister of Estonia (d. 1942)
- May 31 – Jack Holt, American actor (d. 1951)
- June – David Dougal Williams, British painter and art teacher (d. 1944)
- June 13 – Fernando Pessoa, Portuguese writer (d. 1935)
- June 17 – Heinz Guderian, German general (d. 1954)
- June 22
  - Milton Allen, Governor of Saint Christopher-Nevis-Anguilla (d. 1981)
  - Harold Hitz Burton, American politician, Associate Justice of the Supreme Court of the United States (d. 1964)
- June 24 – Gerrit Rietveld, Dutch architect (d. 1964)
- June 27 – Antoinette Perry, American stage director for whom the Tony Award is named (d. 1946)
- June 29 – Squizzy Taylor, Australian gangster (d. 1927)

=== July–August ===
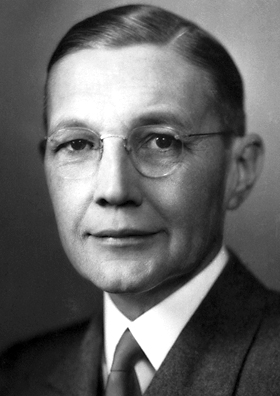
Herbert Spencer Gasser

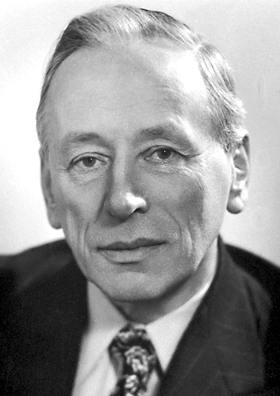
Frits Zernike

- July 5 – Herbert Spencer Gasser, American physiologist, Nobel Prize laureate (d. 1963)
- July 10 – Giorgio de Chirico, Italian painter (d. 1978)
- July 16
  - Percy Kilbride, American actor (d. 1964)
  - Frits Zernike, Dutch physicist, Nobel Prize laureate (d. 1966)
- July 17 – Shmuel Yosef Agnon, Israeli writer, Nobel Prize laureate (d. 1970)
- July 22 – Selman Waksman, Ukrainian-born American biochemist, recipient of the Nobel Prize in Physiology or Medicine (d. 1973)
- July 23 – Raymond Chandler, American-born novelist (d. 1959)
- July 25 – Johannes Spieß, German U-boat commander during World War I (d. 1972)
- August 4 – Taher Saifuddin, Indian Bohra spiritual leader (d. 1965)
- August 6 – Heinrich Schlusnus, German baritone (d. 1952)
- August 9
  - Auguste Cornu, French Marxist philosopher and historian of philosophy (d. 1981)
  - Eduard Ritter von Schleich, German fighter ace, air force general (d. 1947)
- August 13 – John Logie Baird, Scottish inventor (d. 1946)
- August 16 – T. E. Lawrence ("Lawrence of Arabia"), British liaison officer during the Arab Revolt, writer and academic (d. 1935)
- August 17
  - Pieter van der Hoog, Dutch bacteriologist, dermatologist, and Islamicist (d. 1957)
  - Monty Woolley, American actor (d. 1963)
- August 20 – Tôn Đức Thắng, 2nd president of Vietnam (d. 1980)
- August 25 – Inayatullah Khan Mashriqi, Pakistani scholar, politician (d. 1963)
- August 28 – Evadne Price, Australian-British writer, actress and astrologer (d. 1985)
- August 29 – Gunichi Mikawa, Japanese admiral (d. 1981)

=== September–October ===
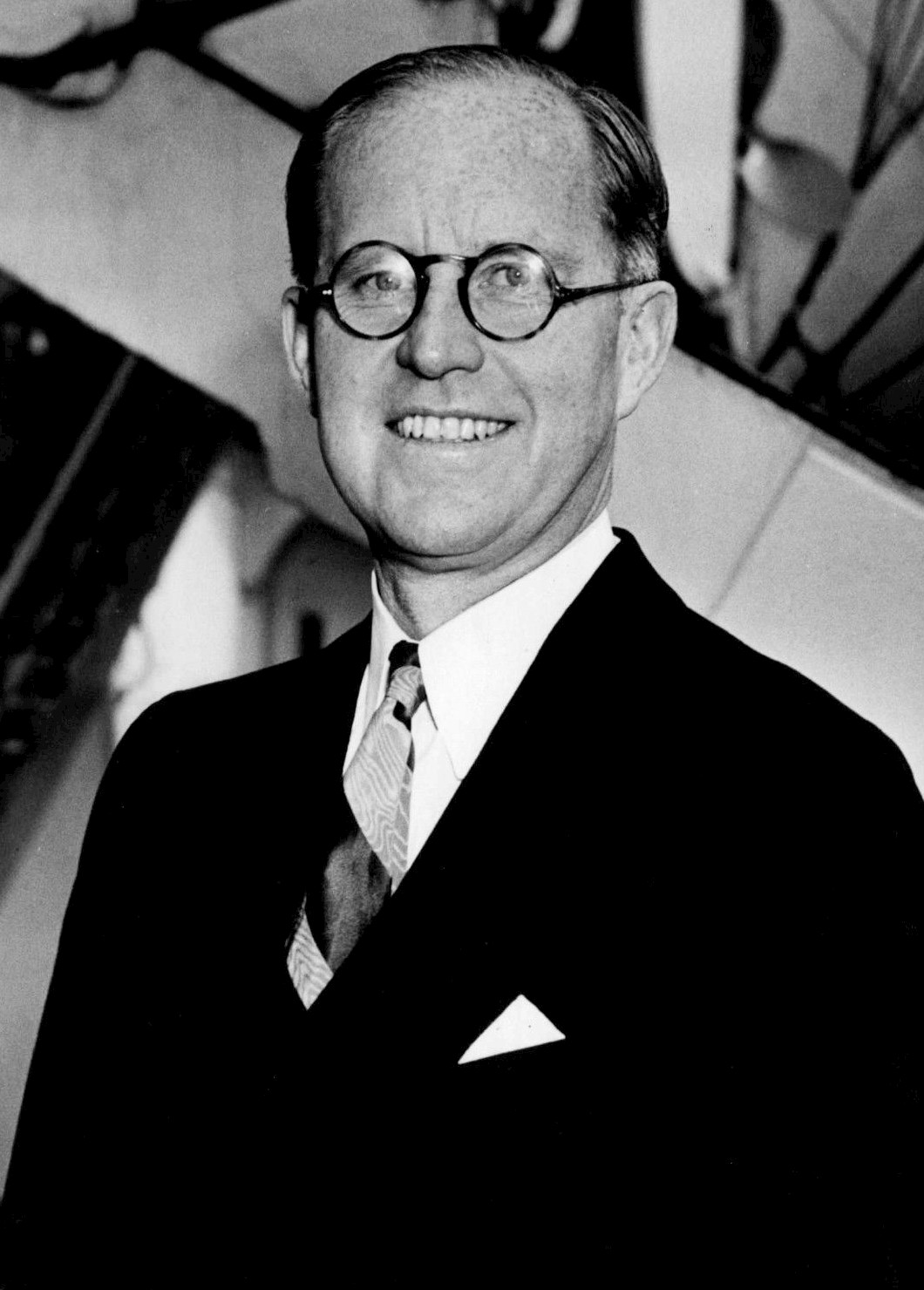
Joseph P. Kennedy Sr.

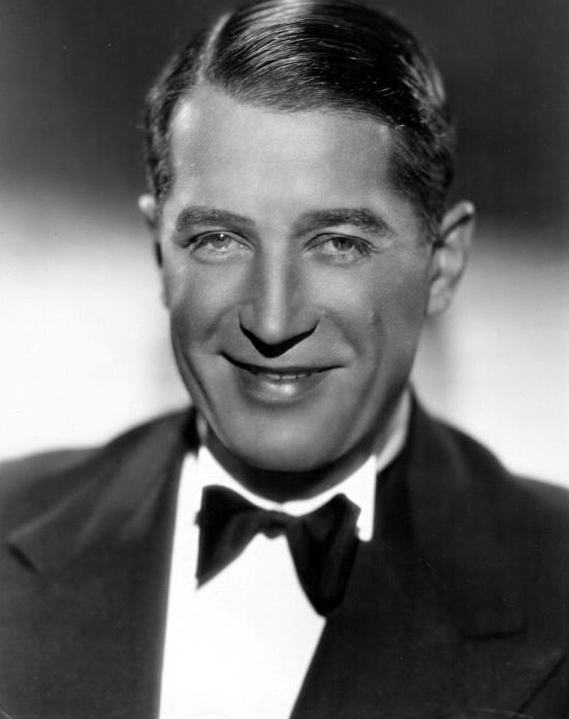
Maurice Chevalier

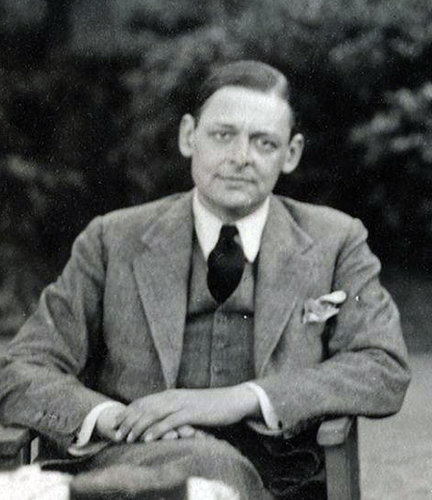
T. S. Eliot

- September 2, Helen Clay Frick, American philanthropist and art collector (d. 1984)
- September 5 – Sarvepalli Radhakrishnan, Indian philosopher, politician and 2nd President of India (d. 1975)
- September 6
  - Joseph P. Kennedy Sr., American politician (d. 1969)
  - Zeng Junchen, Chinese drug baron (d. 1964)
- September 8 – Ida McNeil, American broadcaster and designer of the flag of South Dakota (d. 1974)
- September 12 – Maurice Chevalier, French singer and actor (d. 1972)
- September 16
  - Frans Eemil Sillanpää, Finnish writer, Nobel Prize laureate (d. 1964)
  - W. O. Bentley, English engineer, entrepreneur (d. 1971)
- September 17 – Michiyo Tsujimura, Japanese agricultural scientist (d. 1969)
- September 18 – Grey Owl, British conservationist, impostor, writer (d. 1938)
- September 20 – John Painter, American supercentenarian, world's oldest man between 1999 and 2001 (d. 2001)
- September 26
  - J. Frank Dobie, American folklorist, journalist (d. 1964)
  - T. S. Eliot, American-born British poet, Nobel Prize laureate (d. 1965)
- September 28 – Seán Lester, Irish diplomat (d. 1959)
- October 4 – Friedrich Olbricht, German general (d. 1944)
- October 6 – Roland Garros, French pilot (killed in action 1918)
- October 7
  - Renya Mutaguchi, Japanese general (d. 1966)
  - Henry A. Wallace, 33rd Vice President of the United States (d. 1965)
- October 8 – Ernst Kretschmer, German psychiatrist (d. 1964)
- October 9 – Nikolai Bukharin, Russian Bolshevik and Soviet politician (d. 1938)
- October 14 – Katherine Mansfield, New Zealand fiction writer (d. 1923)
- October 16
  - Eugene O'Neill, American playwright, Nobel Prize laureate (d. 1953)
  - Paul Popenoe, American eugenicist (d. 1979)
  - Mikhail Kaganovich, Soviet politician (d. 1941)
- October 17 – Paul Bernays, Swiss mathematician (d. 1977)
- October 24 – Carlo Bergamini, Italian admiral (d. 1943)
- October 25 – Lester Cuneo, American actor (d. 1925)
- October 30 – Alan Goodrich Kirk, American admiral (d. 1963)
- October 31 – Hubert Wilkins, Australian explorer of the Arctic (d. 1958)

=== November–December ===
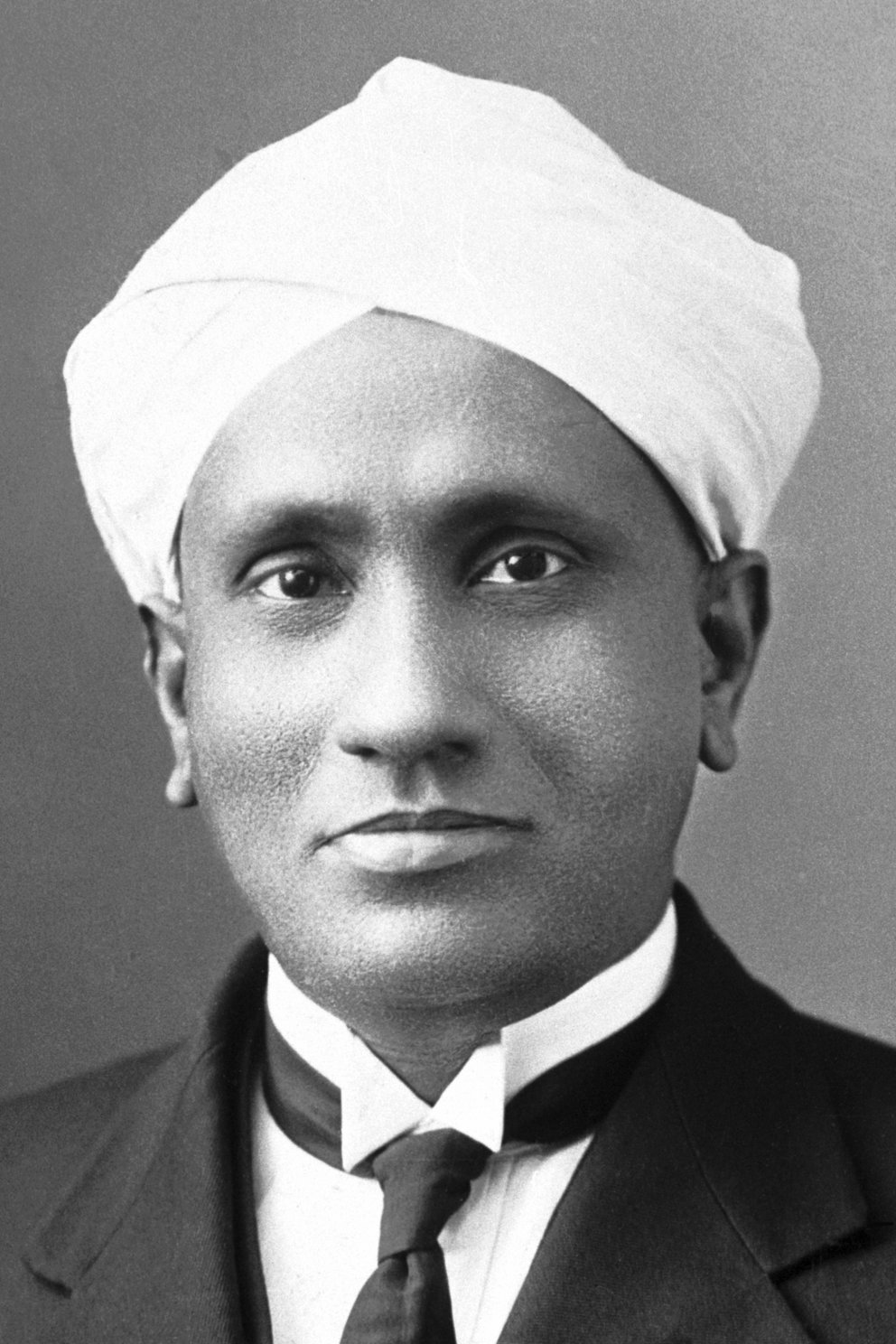
C. V. Raman

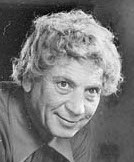
Harpo Marx

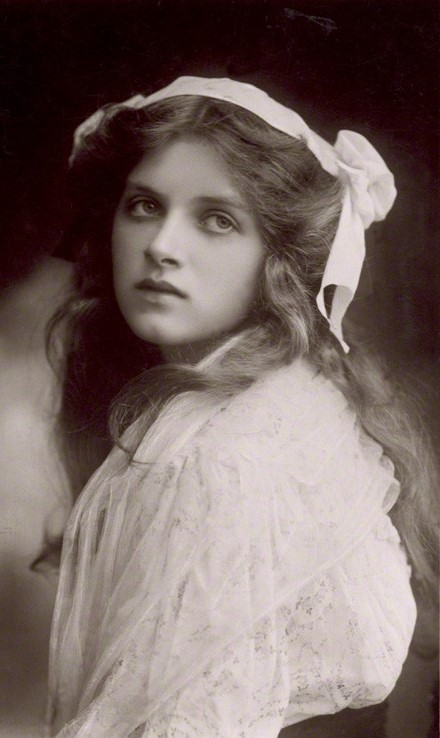
Gladys Cooper

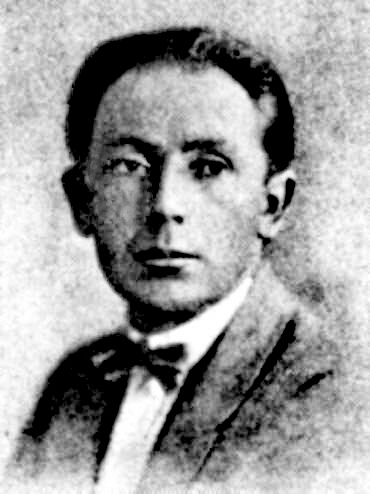
F. W. Murnau

- November 1 – Viliami Tungī Mailefihi, 7th Premier of Tonga (d. 1941)
- November 7
  - Nestor Makhno, Ukrainian anarcho-communist revolutionary (d. 1934)
  - C. V. Raman, Indian physicist, Nobel Prize laureate (d. 1970)
- November 9 – Jean Monnet, French political economist, diplomat and a founding father of the European Union (d. 1979)
- November 11 – Maulana Azad, Indian Independence movement activist,writer,statesman and one of the pioneer of Hindu Muslim unity.
- November 15
  - José Raúl Capablanca, Cuban World chess champion (1921–1927) (d. 1942)
  - Harald Sverdrup, Norwegian scientist (d. 1957)
- November 23 – Harpo Marx, American comedian (d. 1964)
- November 24
  - Dale Carnegie, American writer, lecturer (d. 1955)
  - Cathleen Nesbitt, British actress (d. 1982)
- November 29 – Oswald Rayner, British MI6 agent (d. 1961)
- November 30 – Ralph Hartley, American electronics researcher, inventor (d. 1970)
- December 3 – Yitzhak HaLevi Herzog, Polish-born Chief Rabbi of Ireland and Israel (d. 1959)
- December 4
  - Alexander I of Yugoslavia (d. 1934)
  - Donald B. Beary, American admiral (d. 1966)
- December 6 – Will Hay, British actor, comedian (d. 1949)
- December 7
  - Joyce Cary, Northern Irish author (d. 1957)
  - Jinichi Kusaka, Japanese admiral (d. 1972)
- December 16 – Alphonse Juin, French general, Marshal of France (d. 1967)
- December 18
  - Dame Gladys Cooper, English actress (d. 1971)
  - Robert Moses, American civil engineer, public works director, highway and bridge builder (d. 1981)
- December 19 – Fritz Reiner, Hungarian conductor (d. 1963)
- December 22 – Theodore Stark Wilkinson, American admiral (d. 1946)
- December 25 – Bonita Wa Wa Calachaw Nuñez, American painter (d. 1972)
- December 28 – F. W. Murnau, German film director (d. 1931)
- December 29 – Josef Beran, Czechoslovak cardinal and archbishop (d. 1969)

=== Date unknown ===
- Ibrahim Hashem, 3-time prime minister of Jordan (d. 1958)

== Deaths ==
=== January–March ===
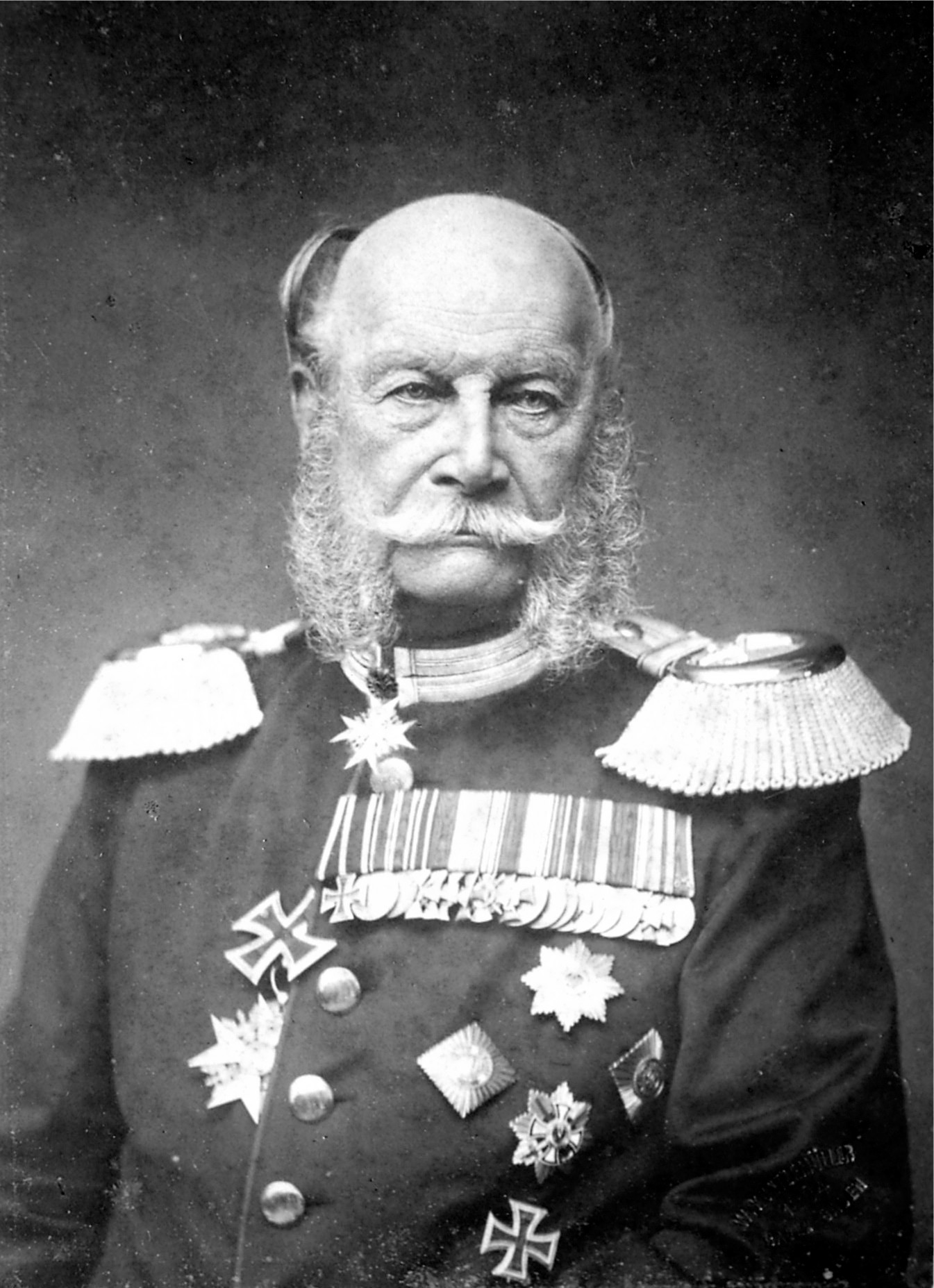
Wilhelm I

- January 7 – Golam Ali Chowdhury, Bengali landlord and philanthropist (b. 1824)
- January 19 – Anton de Bary, German biologist (b. 1831)
- January 20 – William Pitt Ballinger, Texas lawyer, southern statesman (b. 1825)
- January 29 – Edward Lear, British artist, writer (b. 1812)
- January 31 – John Bosco, Italian priest, youth worker, educator and founder of the Salesian Society (b. 1815)
- February 3 – Sir Henry Maine, British jurist (b. 1822)
- February 5 – Anton Mauve, Dutch painter (b. 1838)
- February 9 – Augusto Riboty, Italian admiral and politician (b. 1816)
- February 22 – Anna Kingsford, British women's rights activist (b. 1846)
- February 24 – Seth Kinman, American hunter, settler (b. 1815)
- March 6
  - Louisa May Alcott, American novelist (b. 1832)
  - Josif Pančić, Serbian botanist (b. 1814)
- March 9 – Wilhelm I, German Emperor, King of Prussia (b. 1797)
- March 12 – Henry Bergh, founder of the American Society for the Prevention of Cruelty to Animals (b. 1813)
- March 16 – Hippolyte Carnot, French statesman (b. 1801)
- March 23 – Morrison Waite, Chief Justice of the United States (b. 1816)
- March 27 – Francesco Faà di Bruno, Italian mathematician (b. 1825)
- March 29 – Charles-Valentin Alkan, French composer, pianist (b. 1813)

=== April–June ===
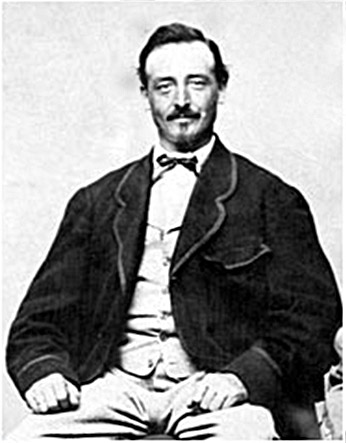
Frederick Miller

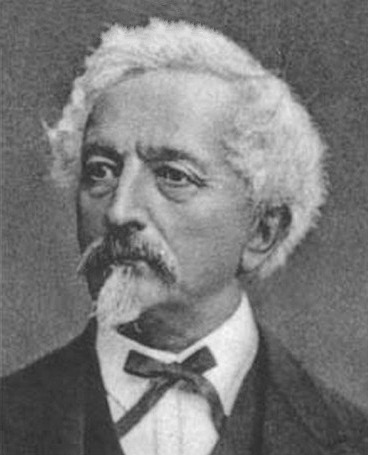
Ascanio Sobrero

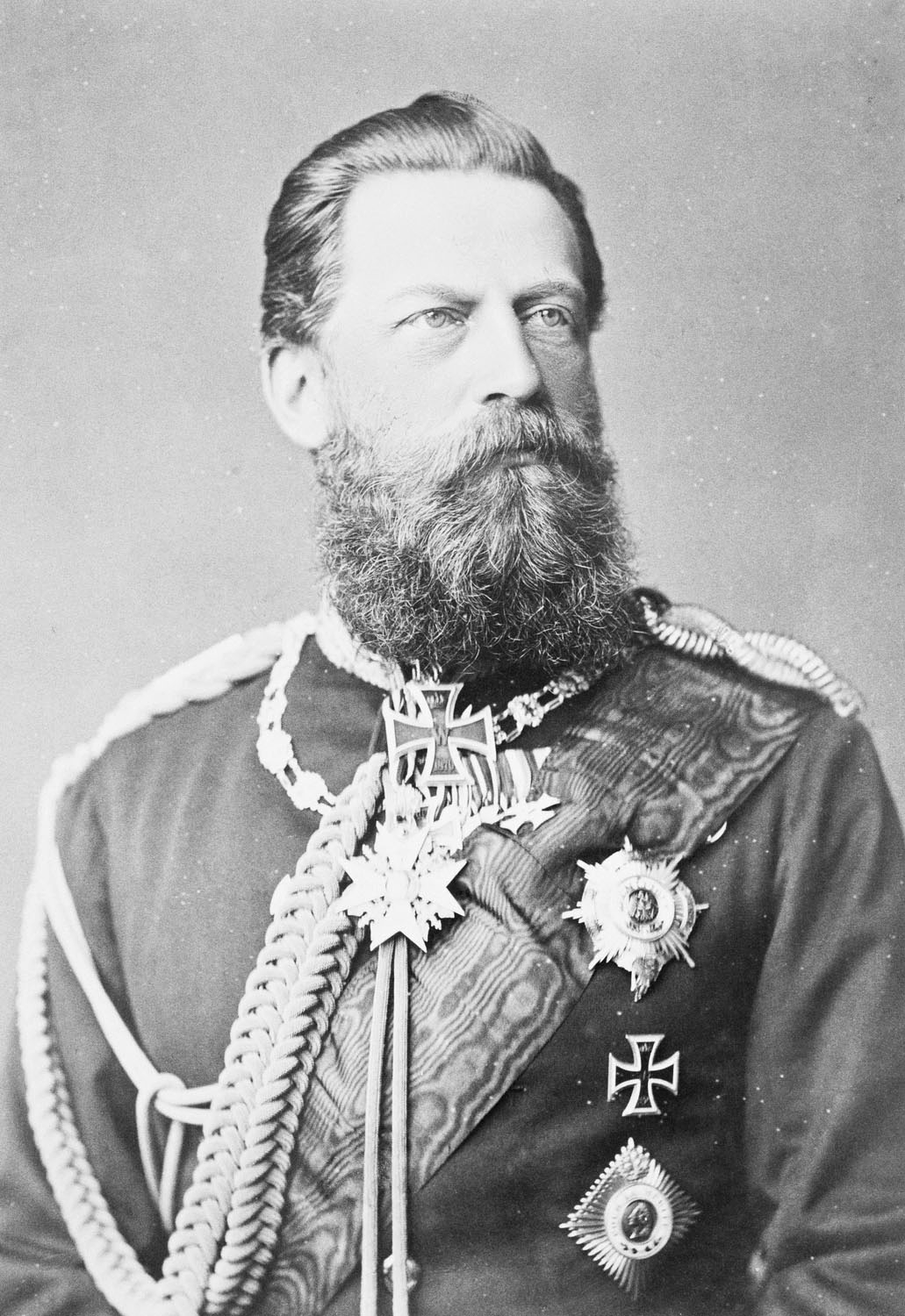
Frederick III

- April 4 – Emma Elizabeth Smith, Whitechapel Murders victim (b. 1843)
- April 14 – Emil Czyrniański, Polish chemist (b. 1824)
- April 15 – Matthew Arnold, English poet (b. 1822)
- April 17 – Ephraim George Squier, American archaeologist, newspaper editor (b. 1821)
- April 19 – Thomas Russell Crampton, English engineer (b. 1816)
- May 6 – Abraham Joseph Ash, American rabbi (b. c. 1813)
- May 11 – Frederick Miller, German-born American brewer and businessman (b. 1824)
- May 15 – Edwin Hamilton Davis, American archaeologist, physician (b. 1811)
- May 19 – Julius Rockwell, United States politician (b. 1805)
- May 26 – Ascanio Sobrero, Italian chemist (b. 1812)
- June 7 – Edmond Le Bœuf, French general, Marshal of France (b. 1809)
- June 8 – Sir Duncan Cameron, British army general (b. 1808)
- June 15 – Frederick III, German Emperor, King of Prussia (b. 1831)
- June 23 – Edmund Gurney, British psychologist (b. 1847)

=== July–September ===
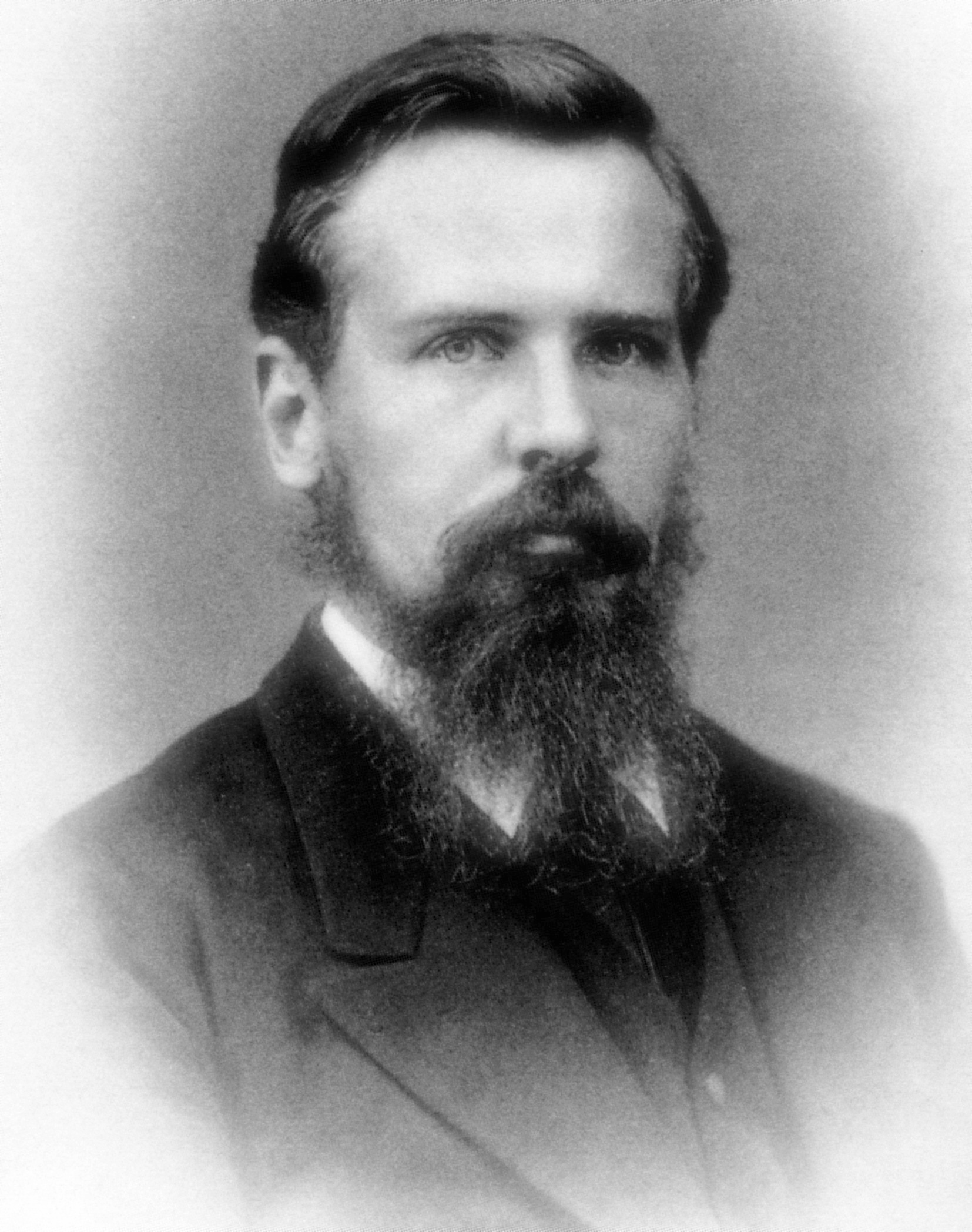
Paul Langerhans

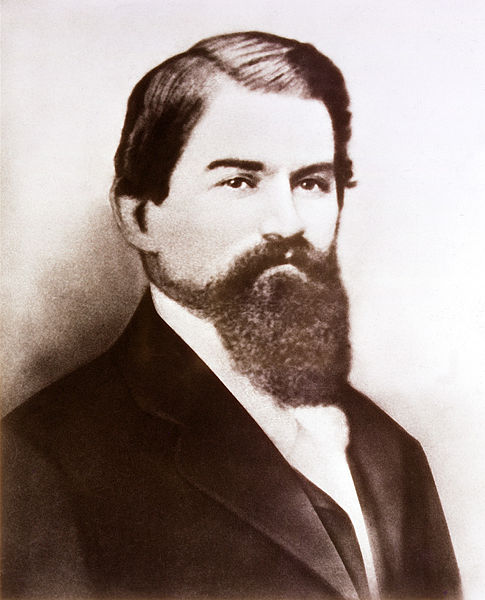
John Pemberton

- July 1 – Maiden of Ludmir, Jewish religious leader (b. 1805)
- July 4 – Theodor Storm, German writer (b. 1817)
- July 9 – Jan Brand, 4th president of the Orange Free State (b. 1823)
- July 20 – Paul Langerhans, German pathologist, biologist (b. 1847)
- August 5 – Philip Sheridan, American general (b. 1831)
- August 7 –
  - Richard Clarke, Canadian politician, Ontario MPP
  - Martha Tabram, possible first victim of Jack the Ripper (b. 1849)
- August 9 – Charles Cros, French poet (b. 1842)
- August 16 – John Pemberton, American pharmacist, founder of Coca-Cola (b. 1831)
- August 20 – Henry Richard, Welsh peace campaigner (b. 1812)
- August 23 – Philip Henry Gosse, British scientist (b. 1810)
- August 24 – Rudolf Clausius, German physicist, contributor to thermodynamics (b. 1822)
- August 31 – Mary Ann Nichols, generally considered the first victim of Jack the Ripper (b. 1845)
- September 6 – John Lester Wallack, American theater impresario (b. 1820)
- September 8 – Annie Chapman, victim of Jack the Ripper (b. 1841)
- September 11 – Domingo Faustino Sarmiento, Argentine politician, writer, and father of education (b. 1811)
- September 23 – François Achille Bazaine, French general (b. 1811)
- September 24 – Karl von Prantl, German philosopher (b. 1820)
- September 30
  - Catherine Eddowes, victim of Jack the Ripper (b. 1842)
  - Elizabeth Stride, victim of Jack the Ripper (b. 1843)

=== October–December ===
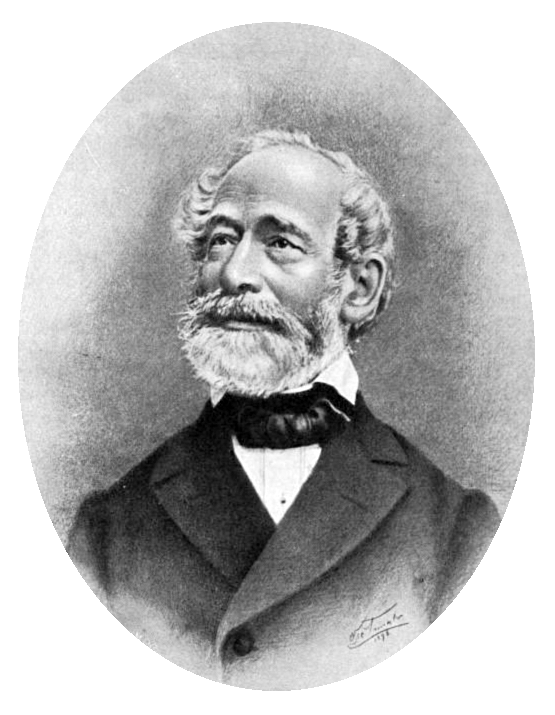
Carl Zeiss

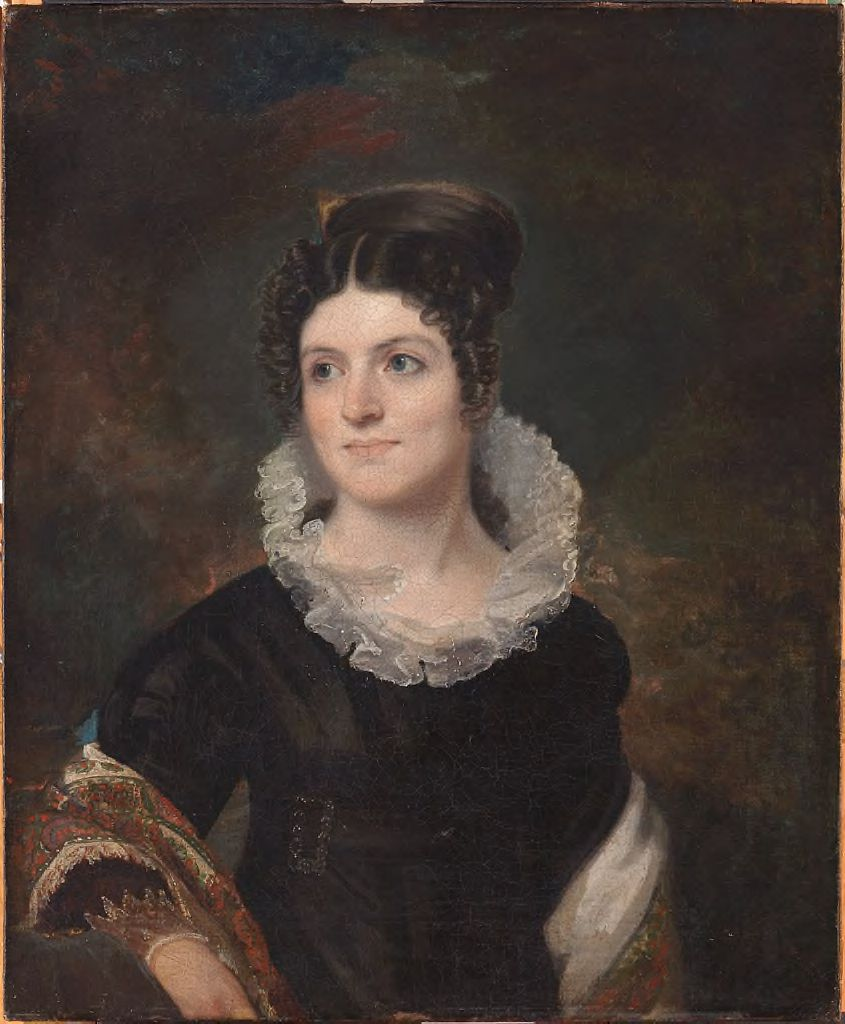
Caroline Howard Gilman

- October 16
  - Horatio Spafford, American author of the hymn It Is Well With My Soul (b. 1828)
  - John Wentworth, Mayor of Chicago (b. 1815)
- October 26 – William Thomas Hamilton, American politician (b. 1820)
- November 1 – Nikolay Przhevalsky, Russian explorer (b. 1839)
- November 9 – Mary Jane Kelly, generally considered the fifth and final victim of Jack the Ripper (b. 1863)
- November 10 – George Bingham, 3rd Earl of Lucan, British army officer and aristocrat (b. 1800)
- November 11 – Pedro Ñancúpel, Chilean pirate active in the fjords and channels of Patagonia. He was executed.
- November 13 – José María Díaz, Spanish romanticist playwright and journalist (b. 1813)
- November 17 – Dora d'Istria, Romanian/Albanian writer and nationalist (b. 1828)
- November 24 – Cicero Price, American commodore (b. 1805)
- December 2 – Namık Kemal, Turkish patriotic poet, social reformer (b. 1840)
- December 3 – Carl Zeiss, German optician, founder of Carl Zeiss AG (b. 1816)
- December 10 – William E. Le Roy, American admiral (b. 1818)
- December 20 – Rose Mylett, Whitechapel murders victim (b. 1859)
- December 24 – Mikhail Loris-Melikov, Russian statesman, general (b. 1826)
- December 31
  - Samson Raphael Hirsch, German rabbi (b. 1808)
  - John Westcott, American surveyor and politician (b. 1807)

=== Date unknown ===
- Caroline Howard Gilman, American author (b. 1794)
