= Karl Prantl =

Karl Prantl is the name of:

- Karl Prantl (sculptor) (1923–2010), Austrian sculptor
- Karl Anton Eugen Prantl (1849–1893), German botanist
- Karl von Prantl (1820–1888), German philosopher and philologist
