= Zeng Junchen =

Chinese businessman and opium kingpin

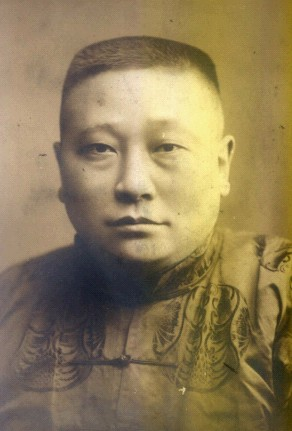
- Born: Zeng Chenxun; 6 September 1888; Sichuan, China
- Died: 6 July 1964 (aged 75); Chongqing, China
- Other name: Yun'an
- Occupations: Head of Shu Yi Tobacco; Chairman of the Special Business Association; Chairman of the Chongqing Salt Merchants' Association
- Spouse: 1

Zeng Junchen (Chinese: 曾俊臣; pinyin: Zēng Jùnchén; 6 September 1888 – 6 July 1964), courtesy name Yun'an (Chinese: 云安; pinyin: Yún'ān), art name Zhengran (Chinese: 正然; pinyin: Zhèngrán), was a Chinese businessman and opium kingpin from Sichuan. Starting off as a restaurateur and salt merchant, he then became a kingpin and amassed a fortune in some four years of dealing with opium. He was often referred to as China's "King of Opium". Zeng was also a philanthropist and donated large sums to charities and schools. He died in July 1964, aged 76, (Note: While Zeng was 75 when he died, per his birth date, Chinese sources maintain that he lived till 76, using East Asian age reckoning.) in Chongqing. Zeng's former residence in Shapingba District is now listed as a local monument.

== Early life and career ==
Zeng was born on 6 September 1888 in Weiyuan County, Sichuan, China; his birth name was Chenxun (Chinese: 臣勋). He also had an art name, Zhengran. His grandfather was Zeng Huailun (曾怀伦), a coal factory and dye-house owner. Chenxun's father Zeng Bencan (曾本灿) took over the business from the eldest Zeng. He began working in salt harvesting at the age of 9, and became a salt merchant around 1905, forging connections with other traders and local authorities. Concurrently, he worked at the Luzhou-based Rong Ji Provisions Store (荣记粮店) with his wife and uncle. Owing to local unrest, food prices were high and Zeng profited from the situation. He used these earnings to open a tavern named "Big Diner" (大餐楼) in 1914; it was, at that time, the biggest food establishment in Luzhou. In 1928, Zeng partnered with a fellow salt merchant to establish a Hubei-based trading firm named Yu Marketing (渝运销湖北). At the peak of its operations, their business handled three hundred-odd "loads" (载) of salt daily, with one load weighing around 93600 catties (approximately 46,000 kilograms); this made them one of the largest salt carriers in the country. For ten years, Zeng served as president of the Chongqing Salt Merchants' Association.

His stint in the salt industry ended after three decades. Salt taxes hit a new high and substantially affected earnings. In 1935, during the boom of the opium trade, Zeng decided to pursue the riches involved in drug-dealing. Nonetheless, he was initially apprehensive of the risk involved. He approached a handful of banks for loans, and signed a pact with friends Li Chongjiang (李舂江) and Shi Zhuxuan (石竹轩), Zeng was able to pool together 300,000 yuan to start his new business, and then reportedly earned nine times that amount.

Fortunately for Zeng, his established dealings with high-ranking officials, including He Guoguang (賀國光), Xia Douyin, Xu Yuanquan, and He Chenrui (何成睿) gave him leeway in operating his opium empire. In fact, the authorities unofficially allied with opium dealers as a means of netting extra revenue and the drug trade was difficult to clamp down on. By-and-by the opium-dealing circle grew in size, largely due to an influx of salt merchants, and Zeng was granted the right to legally ship opium by his friends in the government who also invested in his firms. He was appointed chairman of the "Special Business Association" whose members included drug dealers and smugglers from all parts of the world.

At the height, Zeng was taking in more than a hundred thousand yuan from drugs daily. Zeng would be informed of a tax increase coming his way, and he would then promptly arrange for a meetup with members of the Sichuan treasury, to present them with gifts and a promissory note. His wealth enabled him to purchase various plots of farmland in China. In addition to owning a mega tobacco company, Shu Yi (蜀益烟草公司), he was sole proprietor of Victory Bank (胜利银行) and had shares in Sichuan Meifeng Chemical, Sichuan Salt, and "eleven other banks". Zeng's disciple was Jiangjin-raised Wang Zhengping (王政平), who went on to found his own cartel.

== Retirement and death ==
Following a nationwide crackdown on drugs and growing competition, Zeng retired from the trade in 1939 with substantial savings. He published an account of his time in the realm of opium, titled Five Years In The "Special Business" (经营特业五年纪略). In the later half of his life, he donated to a range of organisations, including a primary school in Sichuan. During a famine in Sichuan in 1943, Zeng personally fed victims whom he observed looting a grocery store at the Shangqishi Market. Zeng was a supporter of the Chiang Kai-shek-led Kuomintang and expressed dismay at its defeat in the civil war against Mao Zedong in 1949. He reportedly said, "All the success I have attained in my life has been a façade; alas, I fall together with the Kuomintang government. I have overcome all challenges, bar this." (Note: In Chinese: 至此,我多年来 ... 只不过是昙花一现,虽以"胜利"始,却以彻底失败终,结果是 随同国民党政府的覆灭而全部垮台。) Zeng Junchen died on 6 July 1964 in Chongqing, China, at age 76. His former residence in Shapingba, Chongqing, a two-story building with a garden, was gazetted as a monument by the local government in May 2006.

Zeng's estimated earnings of five to six million yuan trading opium made him one of, if not the, most successful drug barons of China during his period. Li Xiaoxiong writes in Poppies and Politics in China that Zeng was the "most famous opium merchant (who) made a huge amount of money at the peak of the opium mania." Zeng is frequently referred to as the "King of Opium." His contemporaries regarded him as the "opium king of East Sichuan"; an Italian drug dealer, a Jenkins, lauded Zeng for transforming Sichuan into the "drug capital of the world", whereas an unnamed Chongqing official remarked that Zeng was responsible for the livelihoods of "so many".

== Citations ==
=== Bibliography ===
- Li, Xiaoxiong (2009). Poppies and Politics in China: Sichuan Province, 1840s to 1940s. University of Delaware Press. ISBN 9780874130546.
- Baumler, Adam (2008). The Chinese and Opium under the Republic: Worse than Floods and Wild Beasts. Suny Press. ISBN 9780791469545.
- Meyer, Kathryn (2002). Webs of Smoke: Smugglers, Warlords, Spies, and the History of the International Drug Trade. Rowman and Littlefield. ISBN 9781461705871.
- Liao, Qingyu (2005). 重庆歌乐山陪都遗址 [Monuments of Geleshan, Chongqing] (in Chinese). University of Sichuan Press. ISBN 9787561431030.
- 重庆市市中区志 [Chongqing City District] (in Chinese). Chongqing Publishing. 1997. ISBN 9787536636385.
- Wen, Fang (2004). 毒祸 [Drugs]. China History. ISBN 9787503414350.
- Zheng, Gang (1998). 旧中国黑社会秘史 [Accounts of old China's triads] (in Chinese). Vol. 3. Economical Times. ISBN 9787801274892.
- Wu, Yu (1996). 民国黑社会 [Triad of the Republic] (in Chinese). Jiangsu Historical Publishing. ISBN 9787805198224.
- Li, Xin (1985). 民國人物傳 [Biographies of Chinese] (in Chinese). Vol. 5. Chinese Books.
- Wang, Hongyu (1993). 民国烟赌娼 [Republic of drugs, gambling, and vice] (in Chinese). Cultural Era. ISBN 7538706585.
- 四川省志: 人物志 [Sichuan people] (in Chinese). Vol. 34. Committee of Local History in Sichuan Province. 2001. ISBN 7220035144.
- Weiyuan County Committee (1994). 威远县志 [Weiyuan County] (in Chinese). Bashu.
- Xian, Bo (2005). 烟毒的历史 [History of Opium]. Chinese History. ISBN 9787503416286.
