= Anne Azgapetian =

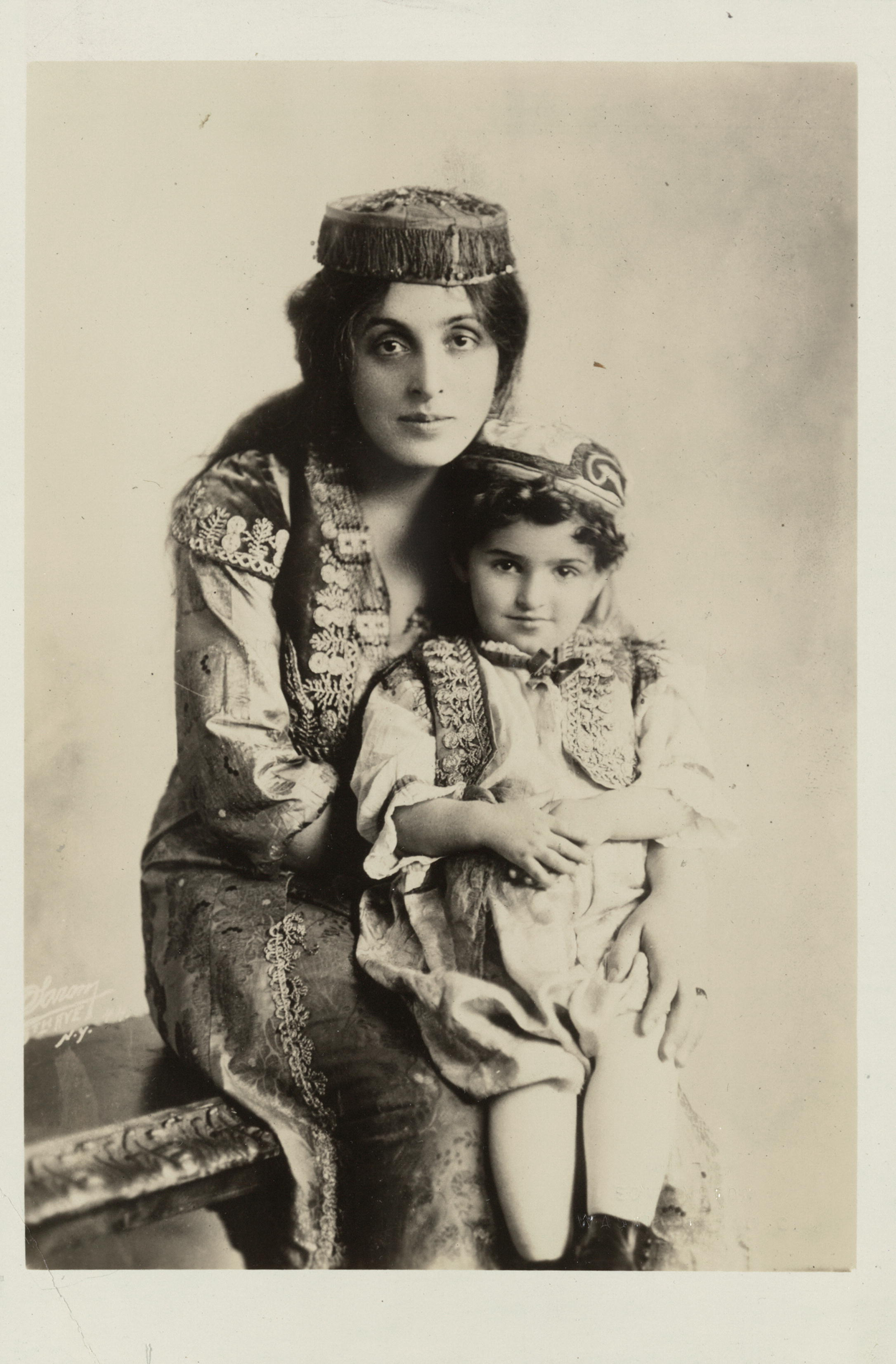
Lady Anne Azgapetian with her daughter Araxie, from a 1921 publication.

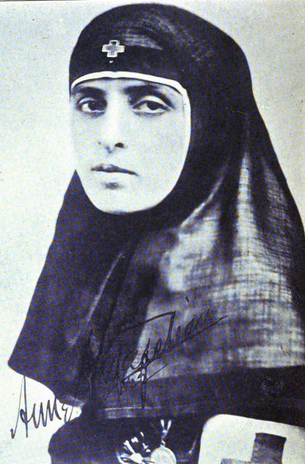
Ann Azgapetian in her Russian Red Cross nurse's uniform, from a 1921 publication.

Anne Azgapetian (May 26, 1888 — September 1, 1973), also seen as Ann Azgapetian and later as Anne Heald or Aya Heald, was a Red Cross worker during World War I, and a lecturer and fundraiser after the war, and a writer. She was born in Russia, married an Armenian general, and lived in the United States most of her life.

== Early life ==
Anne Azgapetian was born in Grodno, now part of Belarus. She moved to the United States with her family, and attended school in Indianapolis, Indiana. She was naturalized as a United States citizen in 1893. She sometimes identified herself as Lithuanian. In 1915, she married diplomat Mesrop Nevton Azgapetian, also a naturalized American citizen; he was born in Istanbul and educated at Columbia University. Soon they left New York for World War I.

== War work ==
Anne Azgapetian worked as a Russian Red Cross nurse in the war, through pregnancy and the birth of her daughter in 1916. She witnessed thousands of war orphans finding safety and food in American refugee camps run by Near East Relief. She was awarded the Medal of St. Stanislaus in Russia, and a gold medal from the Shah of Persia, in recognition of her contributions.

== Lecture tour in the United States ==
Azgapetian made an extended lecture tour of the United States beginning with her husband in 1918, raising funds for postwar relief. "Lady Ann Azgapetian, little woman, dressed in gray, wearing on her head the veil of the Red Cross madonna, and carrying on her waist decorations in ribbon and bronze, stands before us," as one American report described her appearance in 1922. She spoke to churches, women's organizations, and professional and political conventions, including the National Education Association and the National Woman's Party. She also participated in pageants and parades in the cause of Armenian war relief.

== Writings ==
Azgapetian wrote at least four plays: In 1930, she wrote a three-act play, Commandments. She wrote two plays under the name "Anne Azgapetian Heald": the one-act Ravenduz (1960) and another three-act drama, The Eleventh Commandment. Under the name "Aya Heald" she wrote another play, What Reward? (1954), and a novel, Shadows Under Whiteface (1956).

== Later life ==
Anne Azgapetian and her family stayed in the United States after 1918. Her husband died in 1924, leaving her a widow with two young children. She sold Armenian handicrafts to raise money, in Poughkeepsie, New York, in 1925 and in Palm Beach, Florida, in 1926. She moved to Lake Placid, New York, in the mid-1920s, and was described as "an experienced actress" in addition to her other pursuits.

Anne Azgapetian married again, to Willis Heald, after 1930. She died in 1973, aged 85 years. Her daughter Araxie Azgapetian Dunn (1916-2012) was a businesswoman in Lake Placid, New York. Her son Ahzat Victor Azgapetian (1919-1978) was a scientist involved in the space industry.
