= Schiffers & Co. =

Polish silver manufacturer

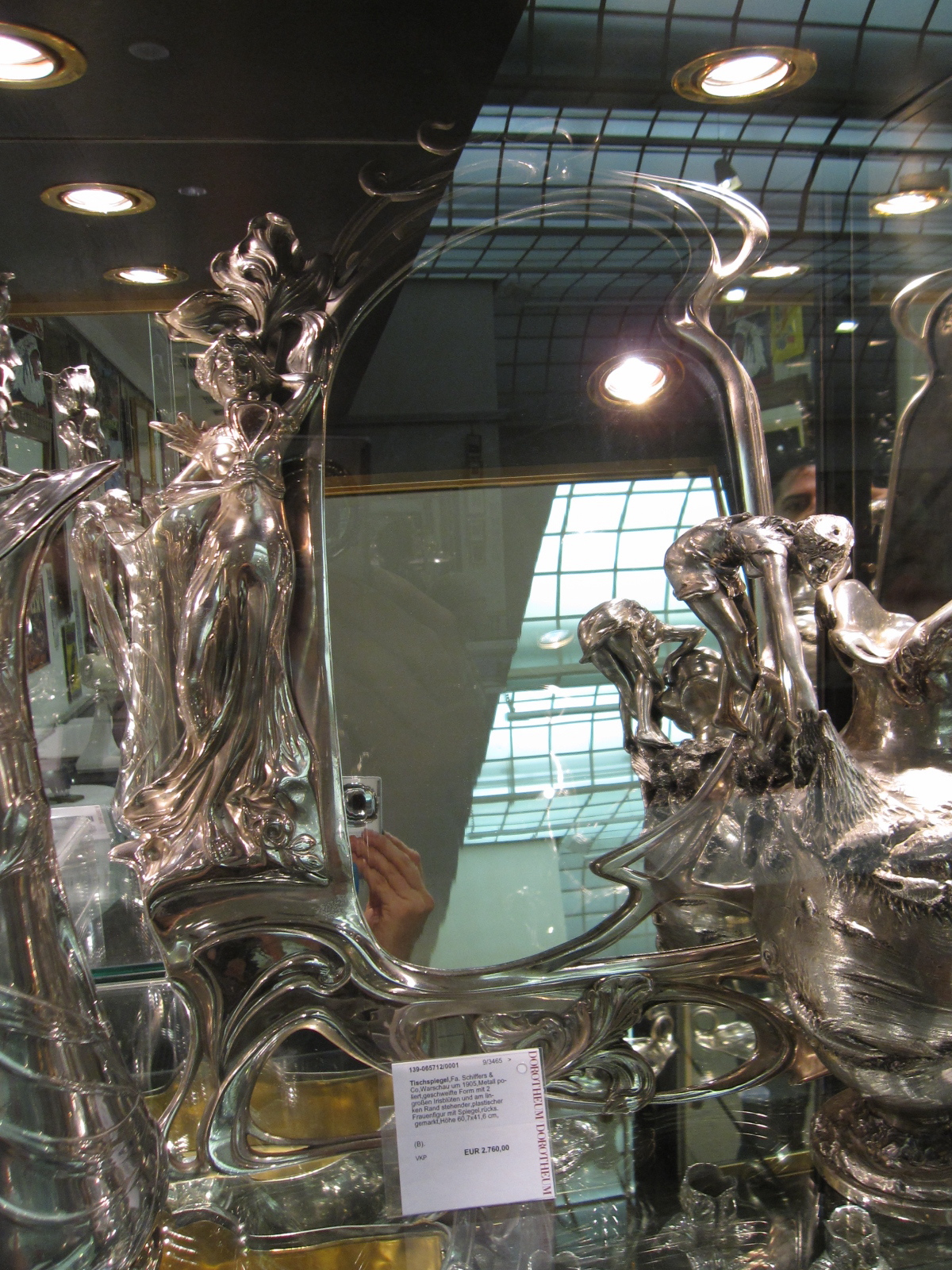
Art nouveau mirror by Schiffers & Co., 1905

Schiffers & Co. was a silver manufacturer from Warsaw, Poland.

== History ==
The company was founded in 1888 by Andrzej Boleslaw Schiffers. At the beginning of the twentieth century, when the company joined John Salinger, the factory employed 100 workers, annual turnover was then 150,000 rubles. After World War I, employment decreased to about 50 employees. The company produced various crockery and silver goods of high quality.
