= Auguste Cornu =

French Marxist philosopher and historian of philosophy

Auguste Cornu (9 August 1888 – 6 May 1981) was a French Marxist philosopher and historian of Marxism.

== Life ==
Auguste Cornu was born on 9 August 1888 in Beaune, France. He joined the French Section of the Workers' International in 1913, and later joined the French Communist Party in 1944. Cornu's 1934 doctoral thesis was the first academic thesis on Karl Marx. A member of the French resistance, he moved to East Berlin during the aftermath of World War II. From 1949 to 1956 he was Professor at the Humboldt University of Berlin.

== Works ==
- Karl Marx: L’Homme et l'oeuvre: De l’Hégélianisme au matérialisme historique (1818–1845). Paris, 1934.
- Karl Marx und die Entwicklung des modernen Denkens. Berlin, 1950.
- Essai de critique marxiste. Paris, 1951.
- Karl Marx et Friedrich Engels. Leur vie et leur oeuvre. Paris, 1955.
- Karl Marx: Die ökonomisch-philosophischen Manuskripte. Berlin, 1955.
