= Karl von Prantl =

German philosopher and philologist (1820–1888)

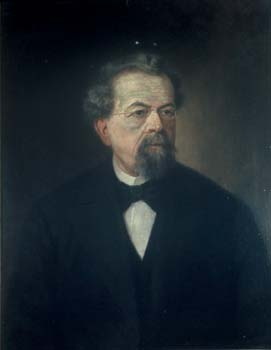
- Born: 28 January 1820; Landsberg on the Lech
- Died: 14 September 1888 (aged 68); Oberstdorf

Karl von Prantl (aka Carl von Prantl) (28 January 1820 – 14 September 1888) (after 1872: Karl, Ritter von Prantl) was a German philosopher and philologist.

== Biography ==
He was born at Landsberg on the Lech. In 1843, he became doctor of philosophy at Munich Observatory, where he was made professor in 1859. He was also a member of the Academies of Berlin and Munich. Strongly in agreement with the Hegelian tradition, he defended and amplified it in Die gegenwärtige Aufgabe der Philosophie (1852) and Verstehen und Beurteilen (1877).

In these works, he emphasized the identity of the subjective and the objective for consciousness, and the fact that the perception of this unity is peculiar to man. He is more important, however, as a commentator and scholar, and made valuable contributions to the study of Aristotle. He published Aristoteles über die Farben (1849), Aristoteles acht Bücher der Physik (1857), and numerous minor articles on smaller points, such as the authenticity of the thirty-eight books of the Problems.

The work by which he is best known is Geschichte der Logik im Abendlande (4 volumes) (Leipzig: Verlag von S. Hirzel, 1855–1870) (History of Logic in the West). Christoph von Sigwart, in the preface to the first edition of his Logic, makes special mention of the assistance he obtained from this work.

Prantl died in Oberstdorf.

== Bibliography ==
- Carl Prantl - Geschichte der Logik im Abendlande (4 volumes) (Hildesheim/Zürich/New York: Georg Olms Verlag, 1997) (anastatic reprint of the original edition)
- Carl Prantl - Die Philosophie in den Sprichwörtern. München : Christian Kaiser, 1858.
