= 1894 in film =

The following is an overview of the events of 1894 in film, including a list of films released and notable births.

== Events ==
- January 7
  - William Kennedy Dickson receives a patent for motion picture film.
  - Dickson and William Heise film their colleague, Fred Ott sneezing with the Kinetograph at Edison's Black Maria studio.
- April 14 – The first commercial presentation of the Kinetoscope took place in the Holland Brothers' Kinetoscope Parlor at 1155 Broadway, New York City.
- June 6 - Charles Francis Jenkins projects a filmed motion picture before an audience in Richmond, Indiana. Earliest documented projection of a motion picture.
- Thomas Edison experiments with synchronizing audio with film; the Kinetophone is invented which loosely synchronizes a Kinetoscope image with a cylinder phonograph.
- Kinetoscope viewing parlors begin to open in major cities. Each parlor contains several machines.
- Birt Acres creates a 70 mm format, which he first uses to shoot the Henley Royal Regatta.

== Notable films released in 1894 ==
=== Birt Acres ===
- Crows on Saffron Hill (lost)
- Haycart Crossing Hadley Green, Middlesex

=== Charles-Émile Reynaud ===
- Autour d'une cabine
- Rêve au coin du feu

=== William K. L. Dickson ===
Annie Oakley.

Fred Ott Sneeze.

Sioux ghost dance.

- Alleni's Boxing Monkeys
- Amateur Gymnast, No. 2
- Annabelle Butterfly Dance, starring Annabelle Moore
- Annabelle Sun Dance, starring Annabelle Moore
- Annie Oakley, starring Annie Oakley
- Armand D'Ary, starring Armand D'Ary
- Athlete with Wand
- Babies in High Chairs
- Band Drill
- A Bar Room Scene
- The Barbershop
- Bertoldi (Mouth Support), starring Ena Bertoldi
- Bertoldi (Table Contortion), starring Ena Bertoldi
- Boxing, starring Jack McAuliffe
- The Boxing Cats (Prof. Welton's)
- Bucking Broncho, starring Lee Martin
- Buffalo Bill (lost), starring William F. Cody
- Buffalo Dance, starring Hair Coat, Parts His Hair and Last Horse
- Caicedo (with Pole), starring Juan A. Caicedo
- Caicedo (with Spurs), starring Juan A. Caicedo
- Carmencita, starring Carmencita
- The Carnival Dance, starring Madge Crossland, May Lucas and Lucy Murray
- Chinese Laundry Scene, directed by William Heise and William K. L. Dickson and starring Phil Doreto and Robetta
- Chinese Opium Den (lost)
- The Cock Fight
- Cock Fight, No. 2
- Corbett and Courtney Before the Kinetograph, starring James J. Corbett and Peter Courtney
- Cupid's Dance, starring Florence Ewer, Lenora Ewer and Mildred Ewer
- Dance, starring Rosa France, Frank Lawton and Etta Williamson
- Dance du Ventre
- The Dickson Experimental Sound Film
- Dogs Fighting
- Edison Employee Picnic
- Fancy Club Swinger, starring John R. Abell
- Finale of 1st Act, Hoyt's 'Milk White Flag'
- Fire Rescue Scene
- Fred Ott Holding a Bird, starring Fred Ott
- Fred Ott's Sneeze, starring Fred Ott
- French Dancers
- Glenroy Bros., (no. 2)
- Hadj Cheriff, starring Hadji Cheriff
- Highland Dance
- The Hornbacker-Murphy Fight, starring Eugene Hornbacker and Murphy
- Human Pyramid, starring Saleem Nassar
- Imperial Japanese Dance, starring the Sarashe Sisters
- Lady Fencers (With Broadswords), starring Louise Blanchard and Helen Englehart
- Lady Fencers (With Foils)
- Lasso Exhibition, starring Frank Hammitt and Lee Martin
- Lasso Thrower (lost), starring Vicente Oropeza
- Leonard–Cushing Fight, starring Jack Cushing and Mike Leonard
- Luis Martinetti, Contortionist, starring Luis Martinetti
- Man of a Thousand Faces, starring George Layman
- May Lucas, starring May Lucas
- Men on Parallel Bars
- Mexican Knife Duel (lost), starring Pedro Esquivel and Dionecio Gonzales
- Miss Lucy Murray, starring Lucy Murray
- Mlle. Capitaine, starring Alciede Capitaine
- Organ Grinder, No. 1
- Organ Grinder, No. 2
- Oriental Dance, starring Rosa
- The Pickaninny Dance, from the 'Passing Show', starring Joe Rastus, Denny Tolliver and Walter Wilkins
- Rat Killing
- Rats and Terrier No. 2
- Rats and Terrier No. 3
- Rats and Weasel
- Ruth Dennis, starring Ruth St. Denis
- Sandow, starring Eugen Sandow
- Sheik Hadji Tahar, starring Sheik Hadji Tahar
- Sioux Ghost Dance
- Summersault Dog, starring Lucy the Dog and Ivan Tschernoff
- Sword Combat, starring Najid and Saleem Nassar
- Topack and Steele, starring George W. Steele and George Topack
- Toyou Kichi, starring Toyou Kichi
- Trained Bears
- Trapeze
- Unsuccessful Somersault
- Walton and Slavin, starring John Slavin and Charles F. Walton
- Whirlwind Gunspinning, starring Hadj Lessik
- The Widder, starring Isabelle Coe
- Wonderful Performing Dog, starring Lucy the Dog and Ivan Tschernoff
- The Wrestling Dog, starring Henry Welton
- Wrestling Match

=== Films directed by other filmmakers ===
- Miss Jerry, directed by Alexander Black, starring by Blanche Bayliss, William Courtenay and Chauncey Depew.

== Births ==
Month	Date	Name	Country	Profession	Died
January	3	ZaSu Pitts	US	Actress	1963
January	6	William Newell	US	Actor	1967
January	22	Matt McHugh	US	Actor	1971
February	8	King Vidor	US	Actor, director	1982
February	14	Jack Benny	US	Comedian	1974
March	26	Will Wright	US	Actor	1962
May	2	Norma Talmadge	US	Actress	1957
May	20	Estelle Taylor	US	Actress	1958
May	26	Paul Lukas	Hungary	Actor	1971
June	16	Norman Kerry	US	Actor	1956
July	23	Arthur Treacher	UK	Actor	1975
July	25	Walter Brennan	US	Actor	1974
July	27	Mientje Kling	Netherlands	Actress	1966
July	29	Charles C. Wilson	US	Actor	1948
August	9	Kathleen Lockhart	US	Actress	1978
August	10	Alan Crosland	US	Director	1936
September	15	Jean Renoir	France	Director	1979
September	26	Gladys Brockwell	US	Actress	1929
September	27	Olive Tell	US	Actress	1951
October	7	Del Lord	Canada	Director	1970
October	20	Olive Thomas	US	Actress	1920
October	27	Agda Helin	Sweden	Actress	1984
November	9	Mae Marsh	US	Actress	1968
November	13	Nita Naldi	US	Actress	1961
December	8	Marthe Vinot	France	Actress	1974

== Debut ==
- Annabelle Whitford (Annabelle Sun Dance)
- William Courtenay (Miss Jerry)
