= Slavin (name) =

Slavin is a surname and sometimes a given name.

== People with the surname ==
- Andrei Nickolay Slavin (born 1951), American engineer
- Arlene Slavin (born 1942), American artist
- Barbara Slavin (born 1951), American journalist and foreign policy expert
- Bryan Slavin, Scottish footballer
- Frank "Paddy" Slavin (1862–1921), Australian heavyweight boxer
- Hugh Slavin (1882–1947), English footballer
- Jaccob Slavin (born 1994), American professional ice hockey player
- Jane Slavin (born 1970), a British actress and author
- Jim Slavin (born 1975), Scottish footballer
- John Slavin, a Scottish footballer
- Jonathan Slavin, American actor
- Josiah Slavin (born 1998), American ice hockey player
- Julia Slavin, American short story writer and novelist
- Kim Slavin (1928—1991), Soviet Russian painter
- Konstantin Slavin, American neuroscientist
- Matvey Slavin (born 1987), Russian-born German-Danish artist
- Mark Slavin (1954–1972), an Israeli Olympic wrestler and victim of the Munich massacre
- Martin Slavin (1922–1988), a British composer and music director
- Morris Slavin (1913–2006), an American historian and Trotskyist activist
- Neal Slavin, an American photographer and film director
- Patrick Slavin (1877–1916), Scottish footballer
- Richard Slavin, birth name of Radhanath Swami
- Robert Slavin, an American psychologist
- Shimon Slavin, an Israeli professor of medicine
- Shmuel Slavin (born 1953), Israeli politician
- Tyler Slavin (born 1992), American football player

== People with the given name ==
- Slavin Cindrić (1901–1942), a Croatian footballer
- Slavin Slavchev (born 1991), Bulgarian singer
