= Slavin (disambiguation) =

Slavín is a memorial monument and military cemetery in Bratislava, Slovakia.

Slavin may also refer to:

- Slavin (name), including a list of people with the surname and given name
- Slavín (Prague), a tomb at the Vyšehrad Cemetery, Czech Republic

== See also ==
- Slaving
- Slavena
- Rad Slavin cis. 112 Z.C.B.J. Hall, a historic building in Comstock, Nebraska, U.S.
