= Annie Oakley House =

Historic house in Maryland, US

- U.S. National Register of Historic Places
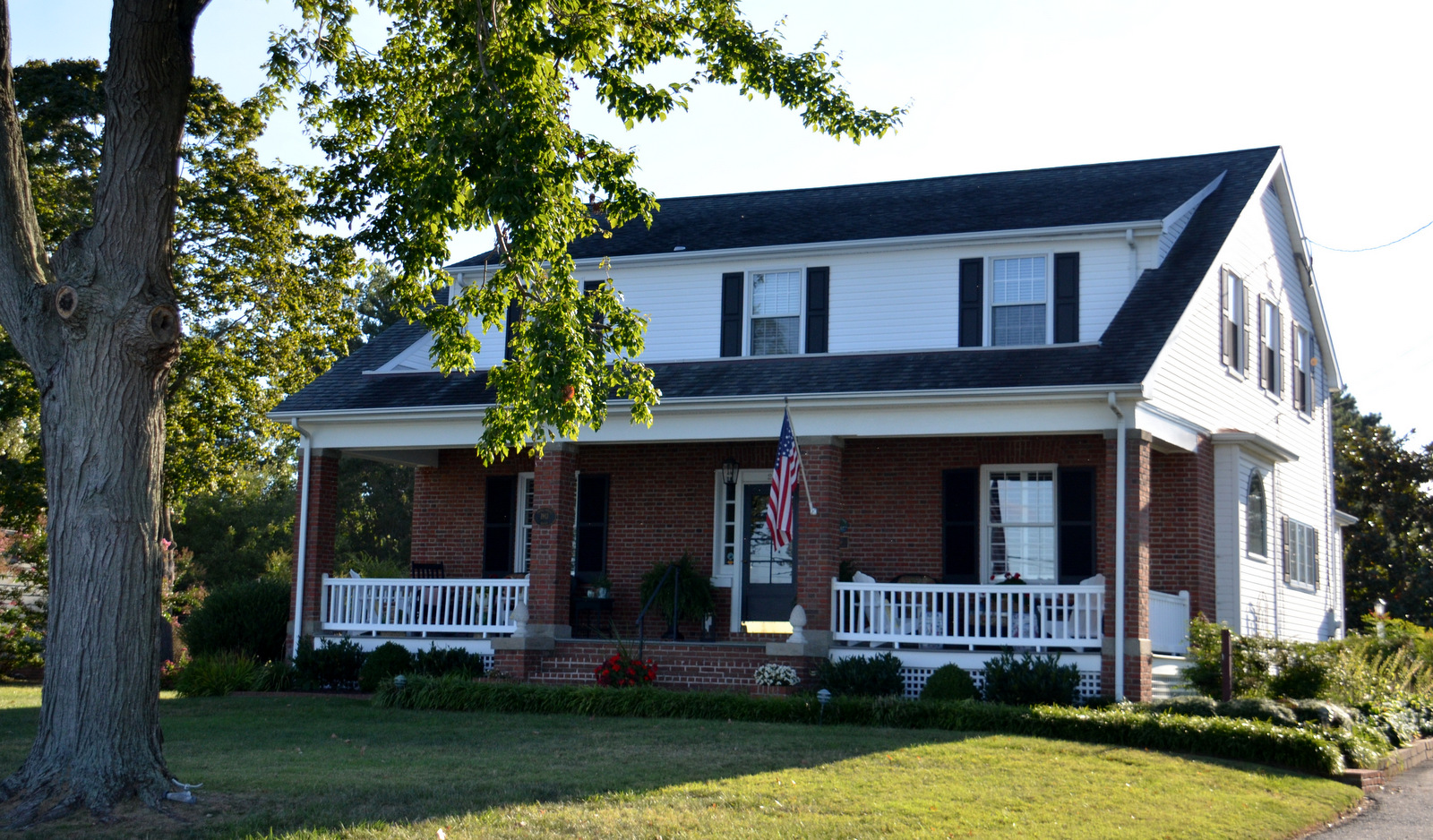
- Annie Oakley House, September 2013

- Location within Maryland Location within the United States
- Location: 28 Bellevue Ave., Cambridge, Maryland
- Coordinates: 38°35′22″N 76°5′23″W
- Area: 1.5 acres (0.61 ha)
- Built: 1913
- Architectural style: Bungalow/craftsman
- NRHP reference No.: 96000469
- Added to NRHP: May 7, 1996

Annie Oakley House is a historic home located at Cambridge, Dorchester County, Maryland. It is a 1 1/2-story, brick-and-frame, Colonial Revival–influenced bungalow constructed in 1913. Behind the house is a small garage and studio apartment. The house overlooks Hambrooks Bay, a protected body of water off the Choptank River. It was constructed as a retirement home for Annie Oakley and her husband, Frank Butler, and is the only surviving property in the nation that was either owned or occupied by Oakley as her primary and permanent residence. It features built-in shelves originally intended to display shooting trophies.

It was listed on the National Register of Historic Places in 1996.
