= Frank E. Butler =

American wildwest marksman (1847–1926)

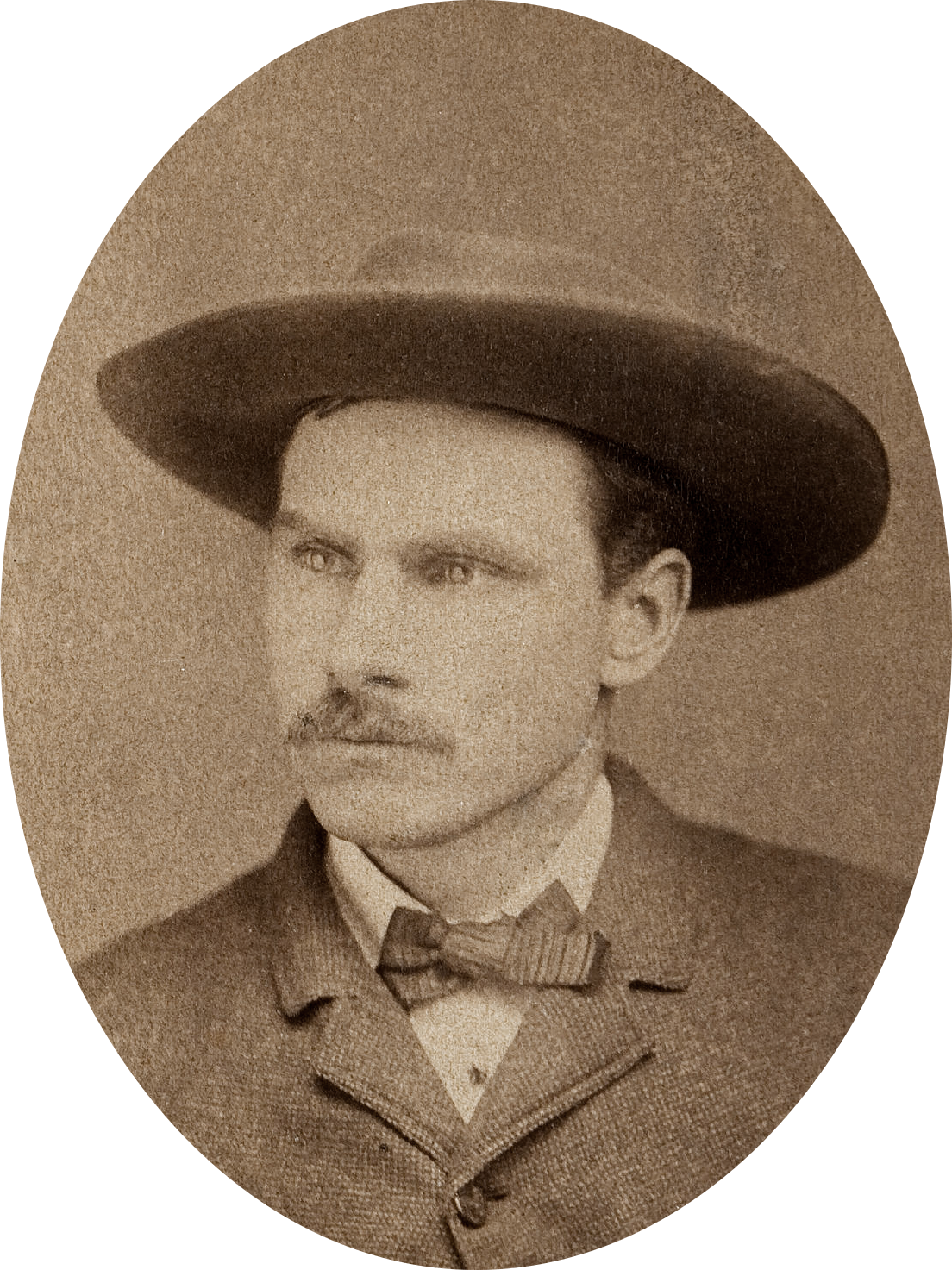
- Butler c. 1882.
- Born: Francis E. Butler; County Longford, Ireland
- Baptized: January 30, 1847
- Died: November 21, 1926 (aged 79); Ferndale, Michigan, US
- Resting place: Brock Cemetery, Greenville, Ohio, US
- Occupations: sharpshooter, show business manager, glass blower
- Spouses: Henrietta Saunders (m. 1870; div. 1876) Annie Oakley (m. 1876; died 1926)
- Children: 2

Francis E. Butler (bapt. January 30, 1847 – November 21, 1926) was an Irish-American marksman who performed in Wild West variety shows. He developed a shooting act with his performing partner John Graham, and when Graham fell ill the sharpshooter Annie Oakley stood in for him. Butler and Oakley began to perform together and later married, and they joined the Sells Brothers Circus. They became famous as a sharpshooting duo during their time in Buffalo Bill's Wild West Show from 1885 to 1901. Butler also worked as a representative and salesman for gun manufacturers.

== Early life ==
Frank Butler was born in County Longford, Ireland, and moved with his family to the United States at the age of 13. While Butler's birth date is listed on his and Oakley's U.S. passport application as February 25, 1852, the obituary for Butler posted by the Associated Press in 1926 has his age as 76, which meant he was born in 1850. According to baptism registers on file at the National Library of Ireland, Butler was baptized on January 30, 1847. His parents were Michael Butler and Catherine Whelan. He was the oldest of their five children. He initially worked a series of odd jobs, including one as a glass blower, while living near Camden, New Jersey. Butler married Henrietta Saunders around 1870; they had two children, Edward and Katie. The two divorced a few years later.

== Annie Oakley and the Wild West Show ==
Frank Butler eventually developed a shooting act and toured with variety shows. After meeting her at a shooting competition in Cincinnati, Ohio, Butler married Annie Oakley on August 23, 1876, although he would later claim the date was June 20, 1882. They developed their shooting act in 1882 when Oakley stood in for Butler's sick partner, John Graham. In 1884, the Butlers joined the Sells Brothers Circus. From 1885 to 1901, they were a fixture on Buffalo Bill's Wild West Show. As Oakley became the star attraction, Butler became her manager and wrote articles and press releases. One of Butler's roles was to throw glass balls in the air for Annie Oakley to shoot, including in an 1894 Edison film of Oakley. Oakley said that the financial part was always in her husband's hands. Oakley returned to performing between 1911 and 1913, this time with Vernon Seaver's Young Buffalo Show, with Butler again as her manager. Butler also worked as a representative of the Union Metallic Cartridge Company and as a salesman for the Remington Arms Company.

== Retirement ==
After they retired, Frank Butler and Annie Oakley Butler had brief residencies in New York City, East Orange, and Nutley, New Jersey, as well as Cambridge, Maryland, and Pinehurst, North Carolina, and then returned to Ohio. Their house in Cambridge, Maryland, is listed on the National Register of Historic Places.

== Death ==
Annie died on November 3, 1926, in Greenville, Ohio. One biographer reported that Butler stopped eating after his wife's death, leading to his own death from malnutrition and starvation 18 days later, on November 21. According to another biographical source, the death certificate listed the cause of his death as senility. Butler was living with Hulda Haines, Oakley's younger sister, in Ferndale, Michigan at the time of his death.

== In popular culture ==
The musical Annie Get Your Gun is based loosely on the lives of Annie Oakley and Frank Butler. Ray Middleton originated the role of Frank in the musical with Ethel Merman as Annie. Howard Keel starred in the film version with Betty Hutton. Bruce Yarnell played Butler in a 1966 Lincoln Center revival, with Ethel Merman again as Annie Oakley. Tom Wopat played the role of Butler in the 1999 Broadway revival. In 1957, a television production starring Mary Martin and John Raitt was broadcast on NBC.

John Considine portrayed Butler in Buffalo Bill and the Indians, or Sitting Bull's History Lesson (1976).

== Filmography ==
Year	Title	Role	Note
1894	Annie Oakley	Self	Uncredited
