= Fred Ott =

American machinist and film actor (1860-1936)

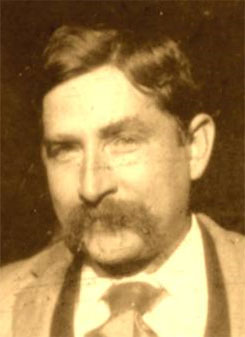
- Ott in Fred Ott's Sneeze, 1894
- Born: Frederick Paul Ott; August 31, 1860; New Jersey
- Died: October 24, 1936 (aged 76); West Orange, New Jersey
- Occupation: Employee at Edison Manufacturing Company
- Known for: Thomas Edison's silent film Fred Ott's Sneeze

Fred Ott's Sneeze

Frederick Paul Ott (August 31, 1860 – October 24, 1936) was an American skilled machinist and key employee of Thomas Edison's laboratories from the 1870s until Edison's death in 1931. His likeness appears in two of the earliest surviving motion pictures – the well-known Edison Kinetoscopic Record of a Sneeze (a.k.a. Fred Ott's Sneeze) and the little-seen Fred Ott Holding a Bird – both from 1894.

The former became an icon of cinema itself. Shot in medium close-up, the film shows Ott seemingly taking a pinch of snuff causing him to sneeze. Comic in format, The Sneeze, as it also came to be known, was made in early January 1894 at the request of Harper's Weekly magazine, which requested illustrations for an article about the Kinetoscope.

Ott began working with Edison in 1874 (at age 14) and became one of the inventor's most valued employees and closest friends. Alongside his brother John F. Ott, he worked with Edison on many inventions, retiring shortly after the nearly-simultaneous deaths of Edison and John F. Ott in 1931. Ott died at his home in West Orange, New Jersey, on October 24, 1936.

== Filmography ==
- Edison Kinetoscopic Record of a Sneeze (1894)
- Fred Ott Holding a Bird (1894)
- [Thomas Alva Edison--outtakes] (Fox Movietone News Story 5-537, recorded in Fort Meyers, Florida, March 15, 1930) University of South Carolina Moving Image Research Collections, https://digital.tcl.sc.edu/digital/collection/MVTN/id/2409.

== See also ==
- William Kennedy Laurie Dickson, 1860–1935, production
- History of film
- Kinetoscope
- 1894 in film
