= Andrei Nickolay Slavin =

- Born: August 19, 1951 (age 73); St. Petersburg, Russia
- Citizenship: United States, Russia
- Education: Ph.D in Radiophysics, Leningrad Technical University (USSR), 1977
- Occupation: Professor of Physics
- Title: Chair of the Physics Department, Oakland University, Rochester, Michigan, U.S.A.

Andrei Nickolay Slavin (born August 19, 1951; St. Petersburg, Russia) from the Oakland University, Rochester, MI is a fellow of the American Physical Society(2009) and was also named Fellow of the Institute of Electrical and Electronics Engineers (IEEE) in 2012 for contributions to magnetic excitations and magnetization dynamics induced by spin transfer.

== Education ==
Andrei received his Ph.D. in Radiophysics from the Leningrad Technical University, Leningrad, USSR in 1977, where he had also completed his master's degree in the same field in 1974.

== Career ==
After his Doctorate, Slavin started as an assistant professor of physics at the Leningrad Marine Technical University (USSR) from 1977 to 1984, where he was then promoted to an associate professor, a position which he held until 1991.

He then moved to Rochester, Michigan (USA) where he secured a position as an assistant professor of physics in 1991 and continues to be a faculty member to date (April, 2017), where he chairs the physics department, which he was promoted to in 2003.
