= Chinese Opium Den =

1894 film by William Kennedy Dickson

- Release date: 1894
- Country: United States
- Language: Silent

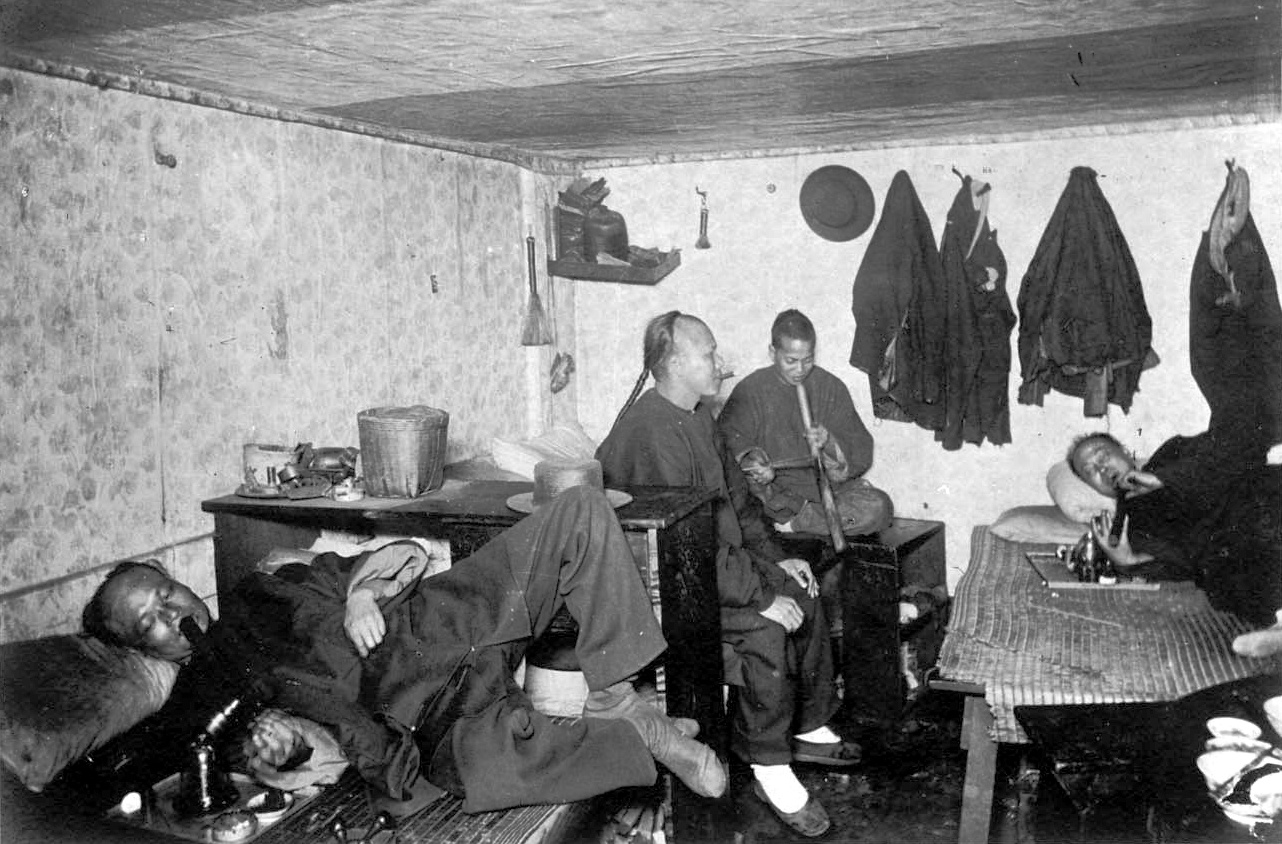
Opium den in a Chinese lodging house in San Francisco, California.

Chinese Opium Den (also known as Opium Joint) is an 1894 American short black-and-white silent film. It is an early motion picture produced by Thomas Edison.

Very little is known about the film as no print is believed to exist and all that remains is a single still image. It is believed to be the first motion picture to explore the issue of drug usage. Ten years later, Edison produced Rube in an Opium Joint, which is seen as the earliest such film that still survives.

According to the Internet Movie Database, the film was made in a 35mm film format with an aspect ratio of 1.33:1. The film was intended to be displayed through means of a Kinetoscope.
