= Annie Oakley (1894 film) =

1894 film

- Annie Oakley (1894)
- Directed by: William Kennedy Dickson
- Produced by: William Kennedy Dickson; Thomas A. Edison (uncredited)
- Starring: Annie Oakley; Frank E. Butler
- Cinematography: William Heise
- Distributed by: Edison Manufacturing Company
- Release date: November 1, 1894
- Running time: 90 seconds
- Country: United States
- Languages: Silent; English intertitles

Annie Oakley is an 1894 American black-and-white silent film from Edison Studios, produced by William K. L. Dickson with William Heise as cinematographer.

== Synopsis ==
The film shows Oakley performing trick shooting as she was known for in her live shows. The first scene is of Oakley shooting her Marlin 91 .22 caliber rifle 25 times in 27 seconds. There is also a scene of her shooting composition balls in the air. The man assisting her is likely her husband, Frank E. Butler. Both were veterans of Buffalo Bill's Wild West show.

== Cast ==
- Frank E. Butler as himself (uncredited)
- Annie Oakley as herself (uncredited)

== Background ==
The film is most notable for being Annie Oakley's first appearance on film. Thomas Edison had wanted to see if his kinetoscope could capture the smoke from a rifle, so he employed Oakley to film some of her shooting. He was particularly interested in capturing rapid motion on film. In 1894, kinetoscopes were installed in 60 locations in major cities around the country. Viewing the films cost a nickel.

It was filmed on a single reel using standard 35 mm gauge at Edison's Black Maria studio in West Orange, New Jersey, November 1, 1894. The original film had a 90-second runtime. The surviving film is preserved by the Library of Congress.

== See also ==
- List of Western films before 1920
