= Carmencita (film) =

1894 film

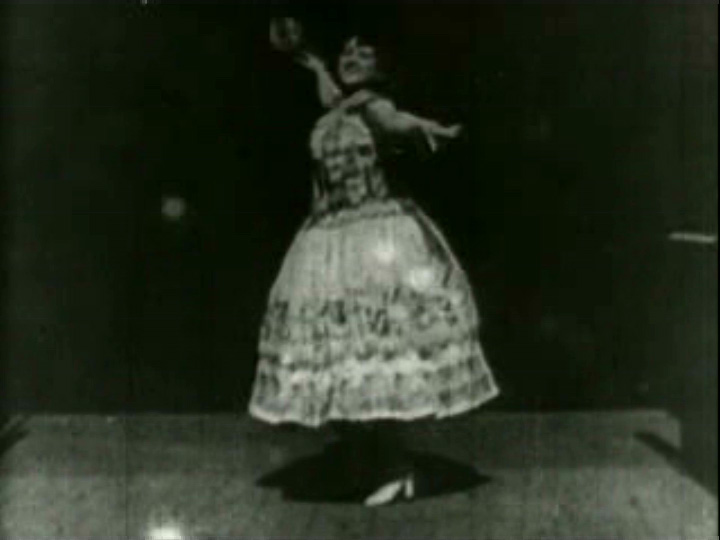
- Screencap from the short film Carmencita
- Directed by: William K.L. Dickson
- Produced by: William K.L. Dickson
- Starring: Carmencita
- Cinematography: William Heise
- Release date: 1894
- Running time: 0:21 at 30 frames per second
- Country: United States
- Language: Silent

Carmencita is an 1894 American short black-and-white silent documentary film directed and produced by William K.L. Dickson, the Scottish inventor credited with the invention of the motion picture camera under the employ of Thomas Edison. The film is titled after the dancer who features in it.

This film is one of a series of Edison short films featuring circus and vaudeville acts. It features the dancer Carmencita going through a routine she had been performing at Koster and Bial's Music Hall in New York City since February 1890. According to film historian Charles Musser, Carmencita was the first woman to appear in front of an Edison motion picture camera and may have been the first woman to appear in a motion picture within the United States.

== Production ==
The film was produced by the Edison Manufacturing Company which had begun making films in 1890 under the direction of one of the earliest pioneers to film, William K.L. Dickson. It was filmed entirely within the Black Maria studio at West Orange, New Jersey, in the United States, which is widely referred to as "America's First Movie Studio." Filming took place between March 10 and 16, 1894.

The film shows Carmencita dancing.

According to the Internet Movie Database, the film is 15.24 m in length. It was made in a 35 mm format with an aspect ratio of 1.33 : 1. The movie was intended to be displayed through means of a Kinetoscope.

== Current status ==
Given the age of the film, its copyright has now expired and it is freely available on the internet to download. A copy is kept by the Library of Congress and can be viewed on their American Memory website. An alternative version, with additional footage shot around the same time, used to be found on Google Video.

The film has also come to public attention as the first title listed on the Internet Movie Database. The website assigns each title a seven-digit code; Carmencita's index code is tt0000001, though it is not the oldest title listed on the site.
