= Carmencita =

Spanish-style dancer (1868–1910)

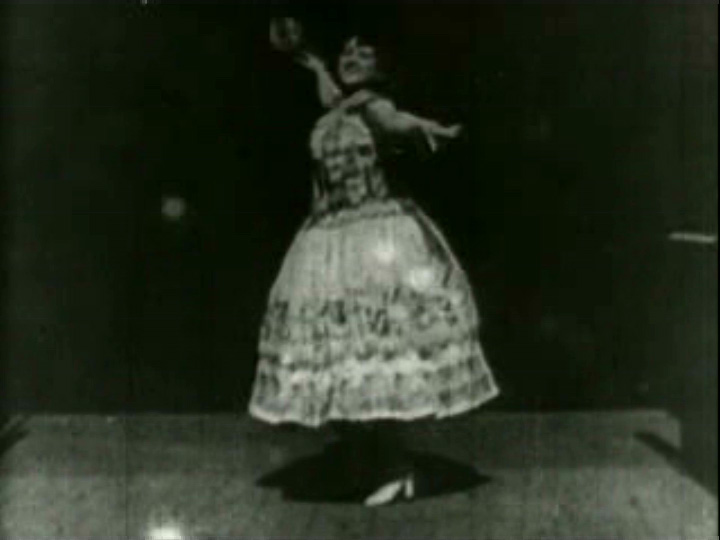
- Screencap from the short film Carmencita in 1894
- Born: Carmen Dauset Moreno; 1868; Almeria, Spain
- Died: 1910 (aged 41–42); Europe
- Years active: 1880–1895

Carmen Dauset Moreno, better known simply as Carmencita (1868–1910), was a Spanish-style dancer in American pre-vaudeville variety and music hall ballet.

== Biography ==
Born in Almería, Andalusia, Spain, Carmencita took dancing lessons in Malaga and first danced professionally at Malaga's Cervantes Theatre in 1880. In 1882, she toured Spain and later traveled to Paris and Portugal. She returned to Paris during the Exposition Universelle (1889) and danced at the Nouveau Cirque where theatrical agent Bolossy Kiralfy saw her performance and subsequently induced her to come to the United States under his management. She debuted in New York on August 17, 1889, dancing in the ballet of "Antiope." Her association with Kiralfy ended in early 1890, and she rose to fame under the management of John Koster and Albert Bial, who put her in their 23rd Street Concert Hall commencing 10 February 1890. Over the next several years Carmencita performed in major cities across the country. She appeared in Koster & Bial's new Music Hall in November and early December 1894 before selling her possessions and returning to Europe. She performed at the Palace Theatre, London in February 1895 and then periodically at the Théâtre des Nouveautés in Paris.

== Appearances in painting and film ==
Carmencita inspired rhapsodic poetry and prose. Today, she is noted for having had her portrait painted by such notable artists as John Singer Sargent, William Merritt Chase and James Carroll Beckwith as well as her role in an eponymous short film, one of many early instances of filmed theater.

According to film historian Charles Musser, Carmencita was the first woman to appear in a modern motion picture made for commercial purposes and may have been the first woman to appear in a motion picture within the United States. In the film she is recorded going through a routine she had been performing at Koster and Bial's Music Hall in New York City since February 1890.

Carmencita in the film

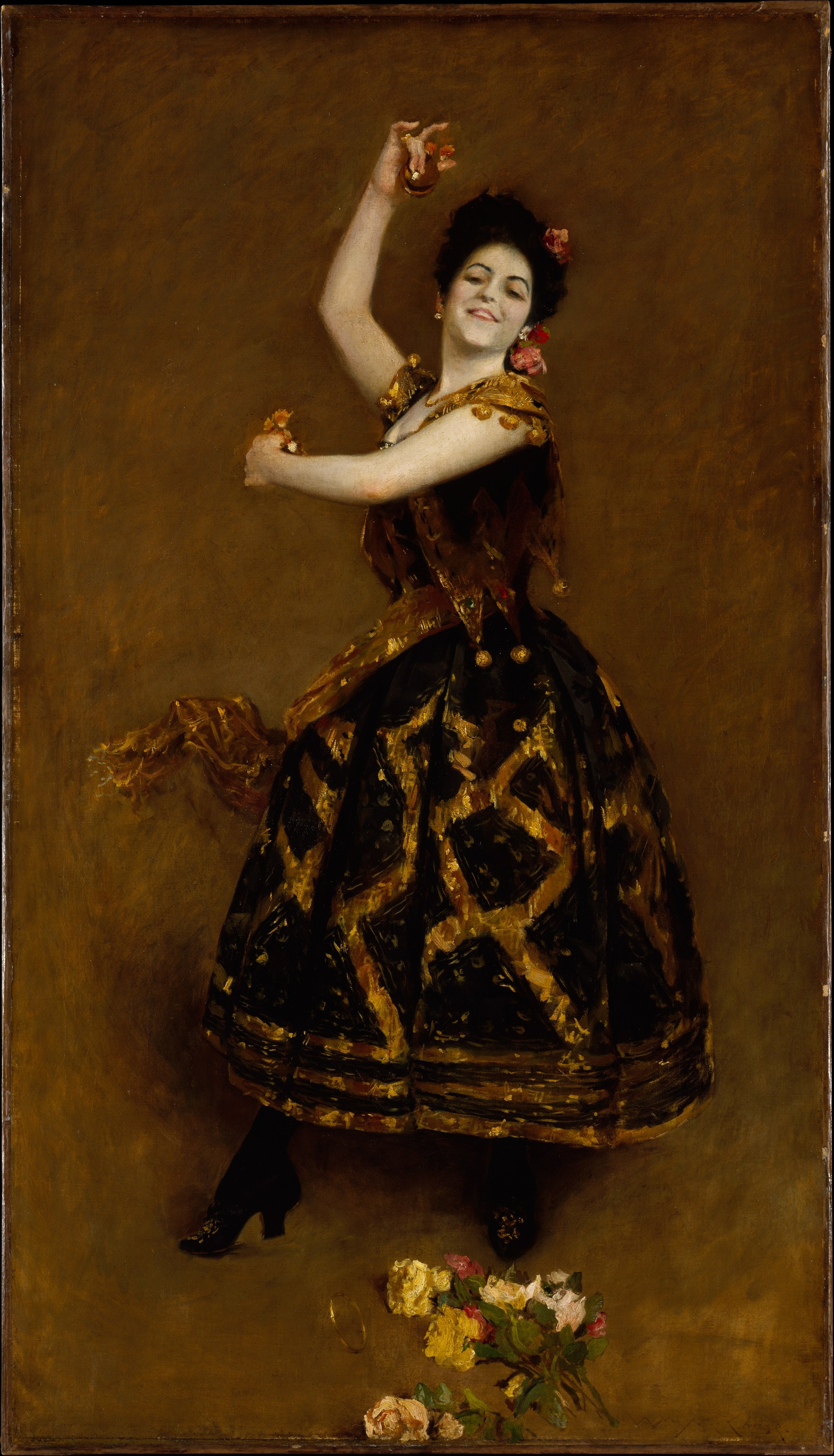
Carmencita, by William Merritt Chase

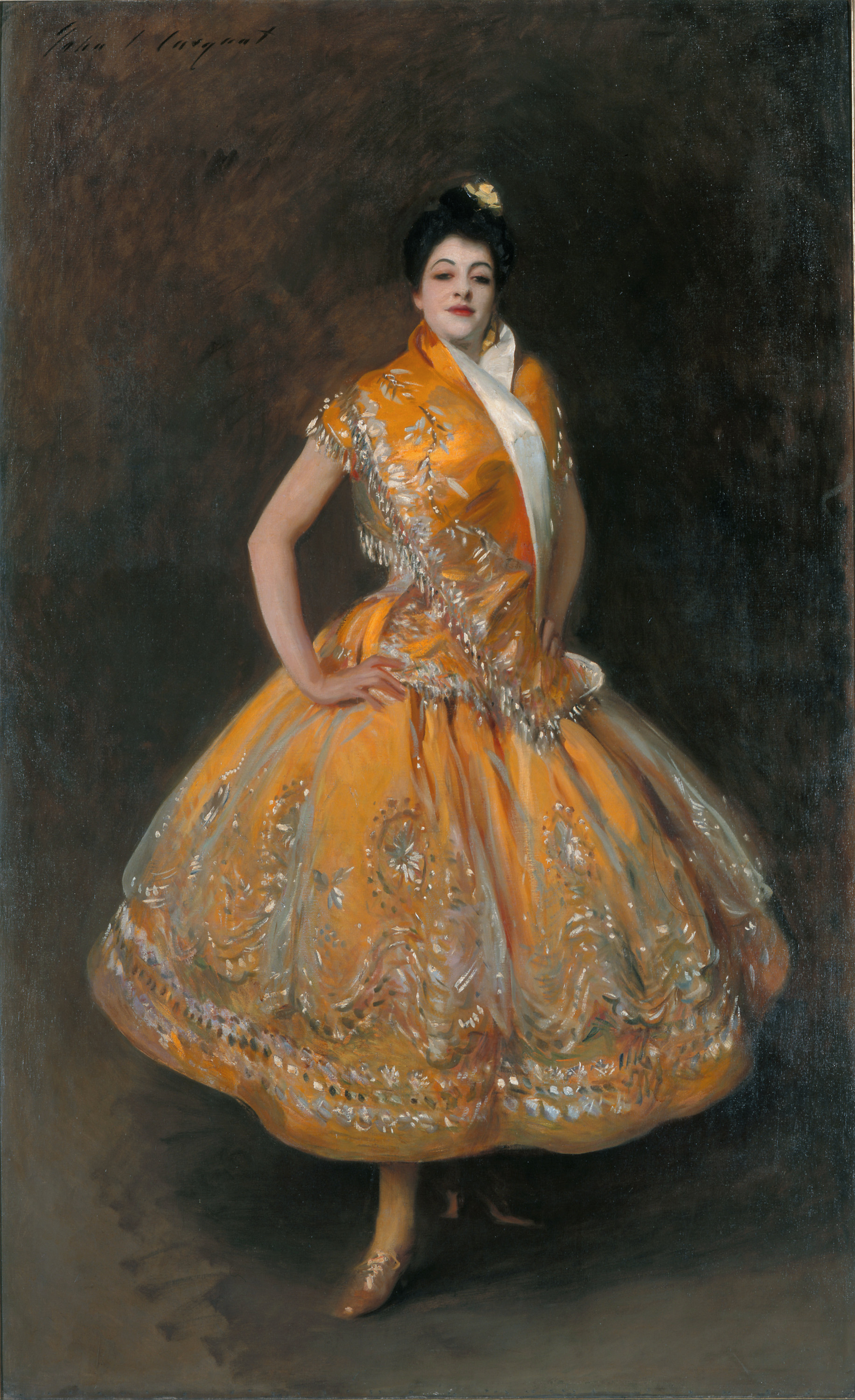
La Carmencita, by John Singer Sargent

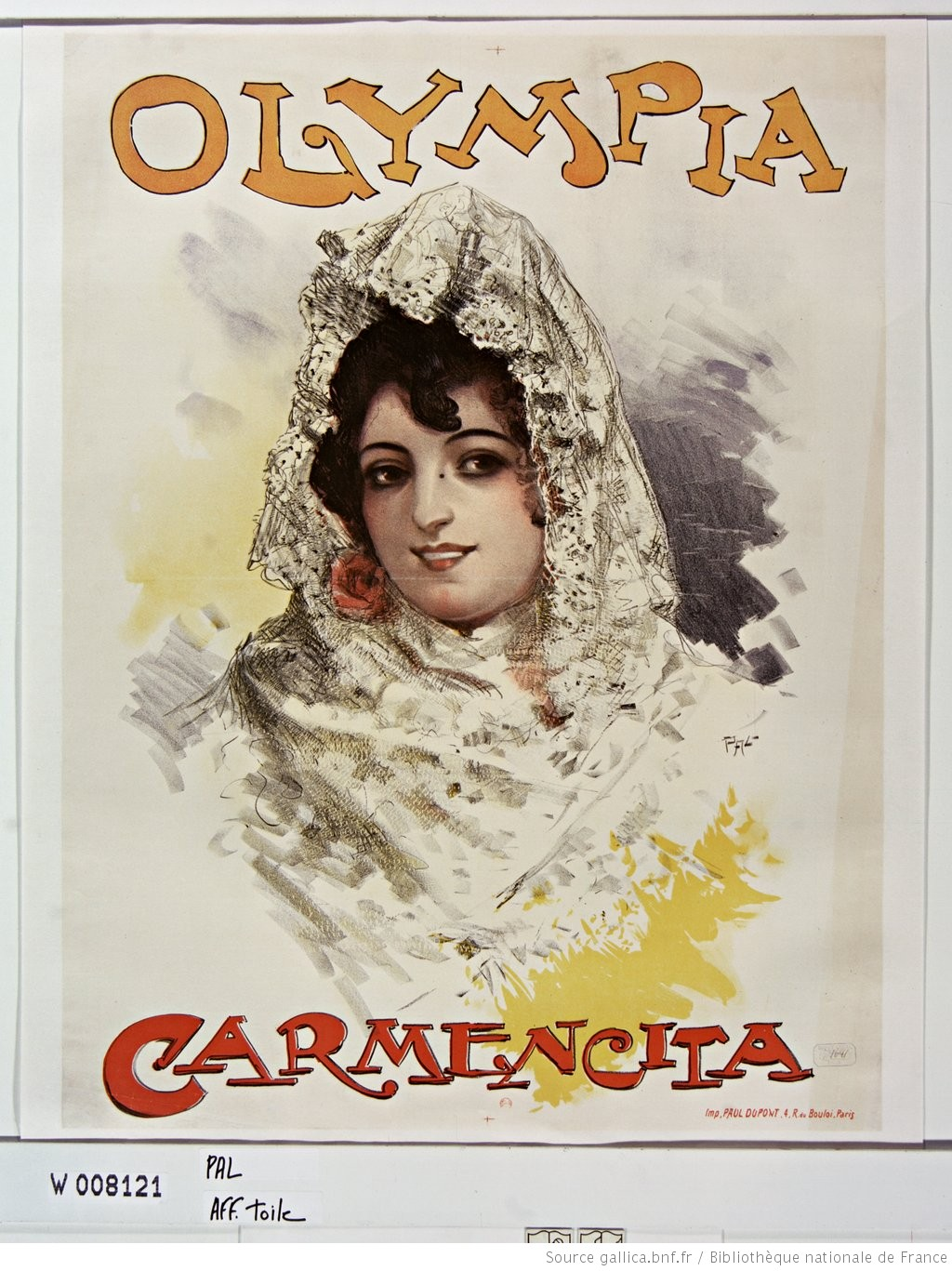
Poster of Carmencita for the Paris music-hall Olympia

== Filmography ==
Year	Film	Role	Other notes
1894	Carmencita	Herself	Sole performer
1946	Den gamla goda tiden	Herself	Posthumous release (archive footage)
