= Hugh Slavin =

English footballer

Personal information
- Full name: Hugh Bernard Slavin
- Date of birth: 5 May 1882
- Place of birth: Kirkdale, England
- Date of death: 1947 (aged 64–65)
- Position: Full back

Senior career*
Years	Team	Apps	(Gls)
1903–1904	Kirkdale		
1904–1910	The Wednesday	48	(0)
Total		48	(0)
- * Club domestic league appearances and goals

Hugh Bernard Slavin (5 May 1882 – 1947) was an English footballer who played in the Football League for The Wednesday.
