= Shimon Slavin =

Israeli professor of medicine

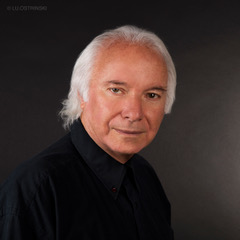
- Born: May 17, 1941 (age 85); Tel Aviv, Israel
- Education: Hebrew University of Jerusalem Stanford University School of Medicine Fred Hutchinson Cancer Research Center
- Medical career
- Profession: Physician
- Sub-specialties: Immunology, cancer immunotherapy

Shimon Slavin (Hebrew: שמעון סלוין; born 17 May 1941) is an Israeli professor of medicine. Born in Tel Aviv, he moved to Jerusalem with his family in 1946, and resided there until 2007.

In 2016, Slavin contributed to other Hadassah Medical Center doctors' efforts of transplantation of stem cells. That same year, International Center for Cell Therapy & Cancer Immunotherapy (CTCI), of which Slavin served as the medical and scientific director, was closed down by Israeli government. His medical license was suspended for six months by the Ministry of Health in 2017, and for another entire year in January 2018. In the latter decision, judge Amnon Strashnov found Slavin to have violated medical ethics and medical law, commented on the previous 6-month suspension as "too far [...] in favor of the defendant [Slavin]", and describing him as committing "serious negligence in fulfilling his duties as a doctor", and that "his greatness is matched only by the depth of his fall". In the same investigation, it was revealed that two patients died after receiving treatment at the clinic.

== Published works ==
=== Books ===
- Bone Marrow and Organ Transplantation: Achievements and Goals. Elsevier. 1984. ISBN 9780444805560.
- Tolerance in Bone Marrow and Organ Transplantation: Achievements and Goals. Elsevier. 1985. ISBN 9780444805577.
- The Radiological Accident in Soreq. International Atomic Energy Agency. 1993. ISBN 9789201016935.
- Non-myeloablative Stem Cell Transplantation (NST). New Frontiers in Cancer Therapy. Darwin Scientific Publishing Ltd. 2000. ISBN 9781903557006.

== See also ==
- Stem cell controversy
- Cancer immunotherapy
