= Annie Oakley =

American exhibition shooter (1860–1926)

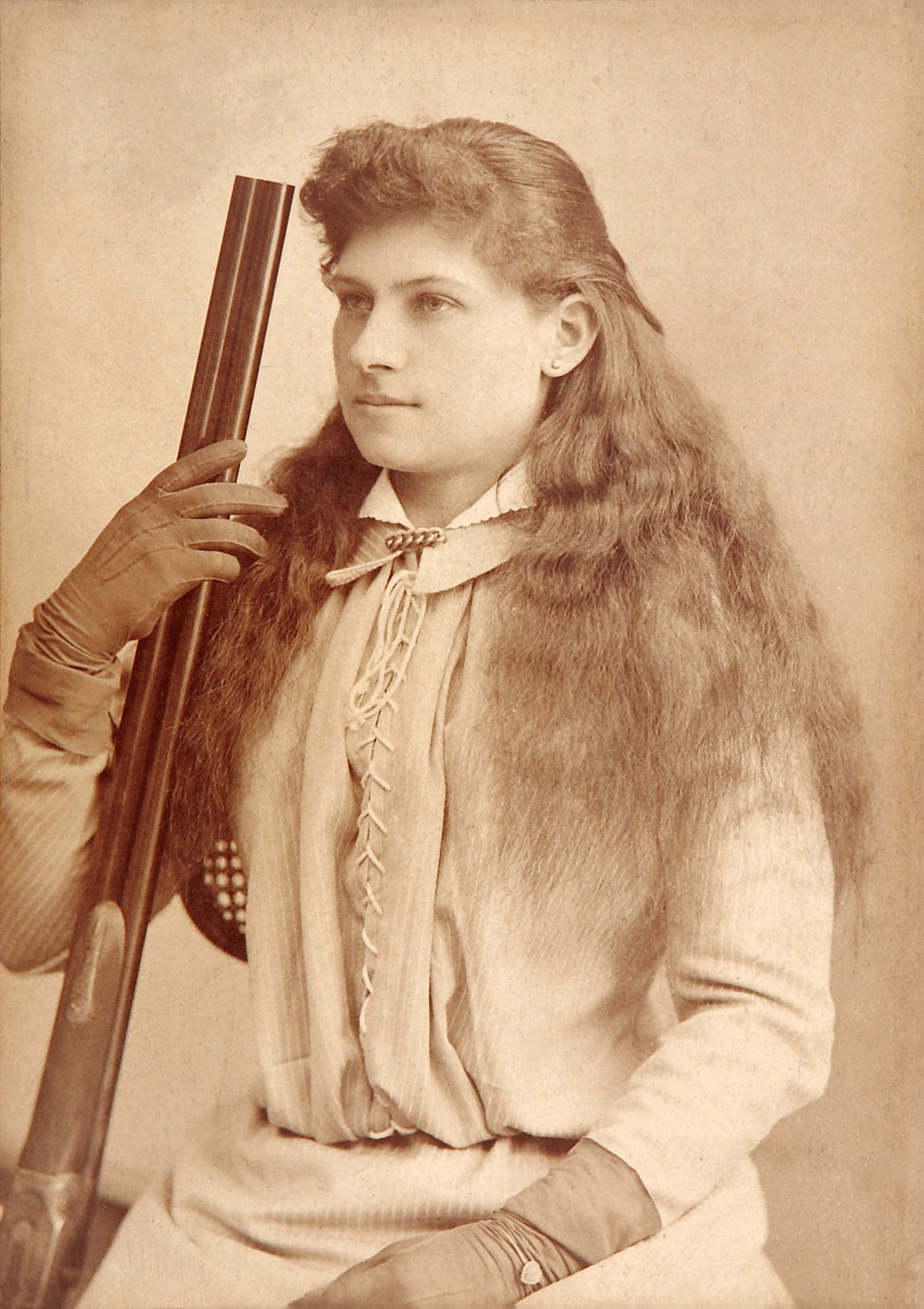
- Oakley in the 1880s
- Born: Phoebe Ann Mosey; August 13, 1860; Darke County, Ohio, U.S.
- Died: November 3, 1926 (aged 66); Greenville, Ohio, U.S.
- Resting place: Ashes buried in Brock Cemetery near Greenville, Ohio
- Other name: Phoebe Ann Butler
- Spouse: Frank E. Butler (m. 1876)
- Parents: Jacob Mosey (father); Susan Mosey (mother)

Annie Oakley (born Phoebe Ann Mosey; August 13, 1860 – November 3, 1926) was an American exhibition/trick shooter and folk heroine who starred in Buffalo Bill's Wild West.

Oakley developed hunting skills as a child in order to provide for her impoverished family in western Ohio. At age 15, she won a shooting contest against an experienced marksman, Frank E. Butler, whom she married in 1876. The pair joined Buffalo Bill in 1885, performing in Europe before royalty and other heads of state. Audiences were astounded to see her shooting out a cigar from her husband's hand or splitting a playing-card edge-on at 30 paces. She earned more than anyone else in the troupe except Buffalo Bill himself.

After a bad rail accident in 1901, she engaged in a less taxing routine, touring in a play about her career. She also instructed women in marksmanship, believing strongly in women's self-defense. Her stage acts were filmed for one of Thomas Edison's earliest Kinetoscopes in 1894. Upon her death, an Ohio newspaper editorial noted her reply to the King of England, who had told her that America should be proud of her: "I haven't given that much thought," she reportedly answered, "but I am proud of America." Since her death in 1926, her story has been adapted for stage musicals and films, including Annie Get Your Gun.

== Early life ==
Annie Oakley was born Phoebe Ann "Annie" Mosey on August 13, 1860, in a log cabin less than two miles (3.2 km) northwest of Woodland, now Willowdell, in Darke County, Ohio, a rural county along the state line with Indiana. Her birthplace is about five miles (8 km) east of North Star. There is a stone-mounted plaque in the vicinity of the site, which was placed by the Annie Oakley Committee in 1981, 121 years after her birth.

Annie's parents were Quakers of English descent from Hollidaysburg, Blair County, Pennsylvania: Susan (née Wise), born 1830, and Jacob Mosey, born 1799, married in 1848. They moved to a rented farm (later purchased with a mortgage) in Patterson Township, Darke County, Ohio, sometime around 1855.

Born in 1860, Annie was the sixth of Jacob and Susan's nine children, and the fifth of the seven surviving ones. Her siblings were Mary Jane (1851–1867), Lydia (1852–1882), Elizabeth (1855–1881), Sarah Ellen (1857–1939), Catherine (1859–1859), John (1861–1949), Hulda (1864–1934) and a stillborn infant brother in 1865. Annie's father, who was already sixty-one years old at the time of her birth, became ill from hypothermia during a blizzard in late 1865. He died shortly after from pneumonia in the following year at the age of 66. Her mother later married Daniel Brumbaugh, had another daughter, Emily (1868–1937), and was widowed once again.

Because of poverty following her father's death, Annie did not regularly attend school as a child, although she did attend later in childhood and adulthood. On March 15, 1870, at age nine, she was admitted to the Darke County Infirmary along with her sister Sarah Ellen. According to her autobiography, she was put in the care of the infirmary's superintendent, Samuel Crawford Edington, and his wife Nancy, who taught her to sew and decorate. Beginning in the spring of 1870, she was "bound out" to a local family to help care for their infant son, on the false promise of fifty cents per week (equivalent to $13 in 2025) and an education. The couple had originally wanted someone who could pump water and cook and who was bigger. She spent about two years in near slavery to them, enduring mental and physical abuse. On one occasion, the wife put Annie outside in freezing temperatures without shoes as a punishment for having fallen asleep over some darning. Annie referred to them as "the wolves". Even in her autobiography, she never revealed the couple's real names.

According to biographer Glenda Riley, "the wolves" could have been the Studabaker family, but the 1870 U.S. census suggests that they were the Abram Boose family of neighboring Preble County. Around the spring of 1872, Annie ran away from "the wolves". According to biographer Shirl Kasper, it was only at this point that Annie met and lived with the Edingtons, returning to her mother's home around the age of fifteen.

Annie began trapping before age seven, and shooting and hunting by age eight, in order to support her siblings and her widowed mother. She sold hunted game to locals in Greenville, such as shopkeepers Charles and G. Anthony Katzenberger, who shipped it to hotels in Cincinnati and other cities. She also sold game to restaurants and hotels in northern Ohio. Her skill paid off the mortgage on her mother's farm when Annie was fifteen.

=== Surname ===
There are a number of variations given for Oakley's family name, Mosey. Many biographers and other references give the name as "Moses". Although the 1860 U.S. census shows the family name as "Mauzy", this is considered an error introduced by the census taker. Oakley's name appears as "Ann Mosey" in the 1870 census and "Mosey" is engraved on her father's headstone and appears in his military record; "Mosey" is the official spelling by the Annie Oakley Foundation, maintained by her living relatives. The spelling "Mosie" has also appeared.

According to Kasper, Oakley insisted that her family name be spelled "Mozee", leading to arguments with her brother John. Kasper speculates that Oakley may have considered "Mozee" to be a more phonetic spelling. There is also popular speculation that young Oakley had been teased about her name by other children.

Prior to their double wedding in March 1884, Oakley's brother John and one of her sisters, Hulda, changed their surnames to "Moses".

== Marriage and career ==
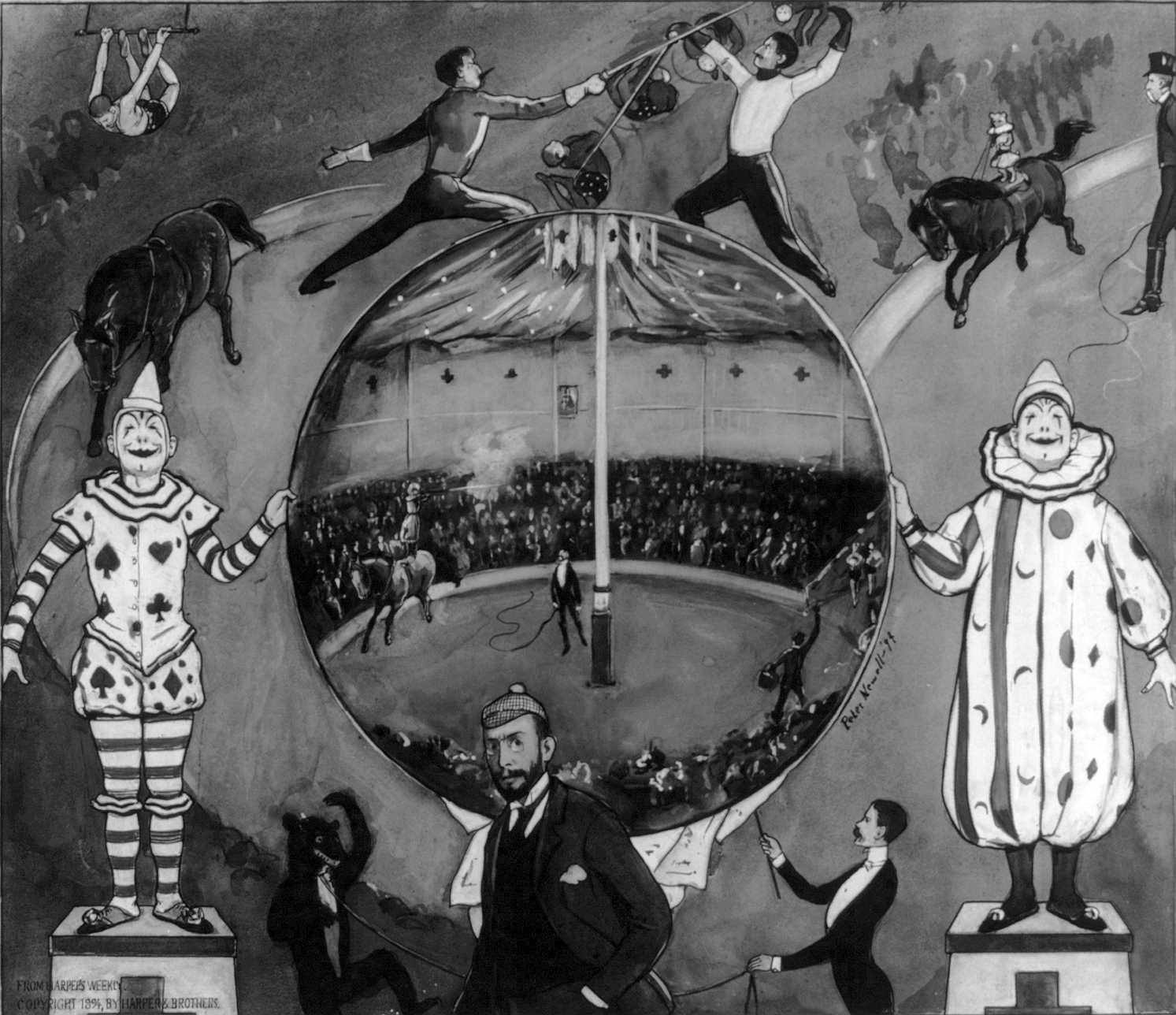
The Amateur Circus at Nutley (1894) by American illustrator Peter Newell. The scene depicted in the center is of Annie Oakley, standing on horseback, demonstrating her shooting ability.

Annie became well known throughout the region. On Thanksgiving Day 1875, the Baughman & Butler shooting act was being performed in Cincinnati. Traveling show marksman and former dog trainer Frank E. Butler (1847–1926), an Irish immigrant, placed a $100 bet (equivalent to $2,900 in 2025) with Cincinnati hotel owner Jack Frost that Butler could beat any local fancy shooter. The hotelier arranged a shooting match between Butler and the fifteen-year-old Annie, saying, "The last opponent Butler expected was a five-foot-tall [1.52 m] 15-year-old girl named Annie." The contest involved shooting live pigeons that were released from traps. After missing on his 25th shot, Butler lost the match and the bet. Another account says that Butler hit on his last shot, but the bird fell dead about 2 feet (60 cm) beyond the boundary line. Butler began courting Annie, and they married. They had no children.

According to a modern-day account in The Cincinnati Enquirer, it is possible that the shooting match took place in 1881, not 1875. It appears the time of the event was never recorded. Biographer Shirl Kasper states that the shooting match took place in the spring of 1881 near Greenville, possibly in North Star, as mentioned by Butler during interviews in 1903 and 1924. Other sources seem to coincide with the North Fairmount location near Cincinnati if the event occurred in 1881.

The Bevis House hotel was still being operated by Martin Bevis and W. H. Ridenour in 1875. It opened around 1860, after the building had been previously used as a pork packaging facility. Jack Frost did not obtain management of the hotel until 1879. The Baughman & Butler shooting act first appeared on the pages of The Cincinnati Enquirer in 1880. The pair signed with Sells Brothers Circus in 1881, and made an appearance at the Coliseum Opera House later that year.

Oakley and Butler were married a year afterward. A certificate on file with the Archives of Ontario, Registration Number 49594, reports that Butler and Oakley were wed on June 20, 1882, in Windsor, Ontario. Many sources say the marriage took place on August 23, 1876, in Cincinnati, but no recorded certificate confirms that date. A possible reason for the contradictory dates is that Butler's divorce from his first wife, Henrietta Saunders, was not yet final in 1876. An 1880 U.S. census record shows Saunders as married. Sources mentioning Butler's first wife as Elizabeth are inaccurate; Elizabeth was his granddaughter, her father being Edward F. Butler. Throughout Oakley's show-business career, the public was often led to believe that she was five or six years younger than she was; The later marriage date would have better supported her fictional age.

=== Increase in popularity and touring ===
"Aim at the high mark and you will hit it. No, not the first time, not the second time and maybe not the third. But keep on aiming and keep on shooting for only practice will make you perfect. Finally you'll hit the bull's-eye of success."

— Annie Oakley exhibit at the National Cowgirl Museum and Hall of Fame in Fort Worth, Texas

Annie and Frank Butler lived in Cincinnati for a time. Oakley, the stage name she adopted when she and Frank began performing together, is believed to have been taken from the city's neighborhood of Oakley, where they resided. Some people believe she took the name because that was the name of the man who had paid her train fare when she was a child.

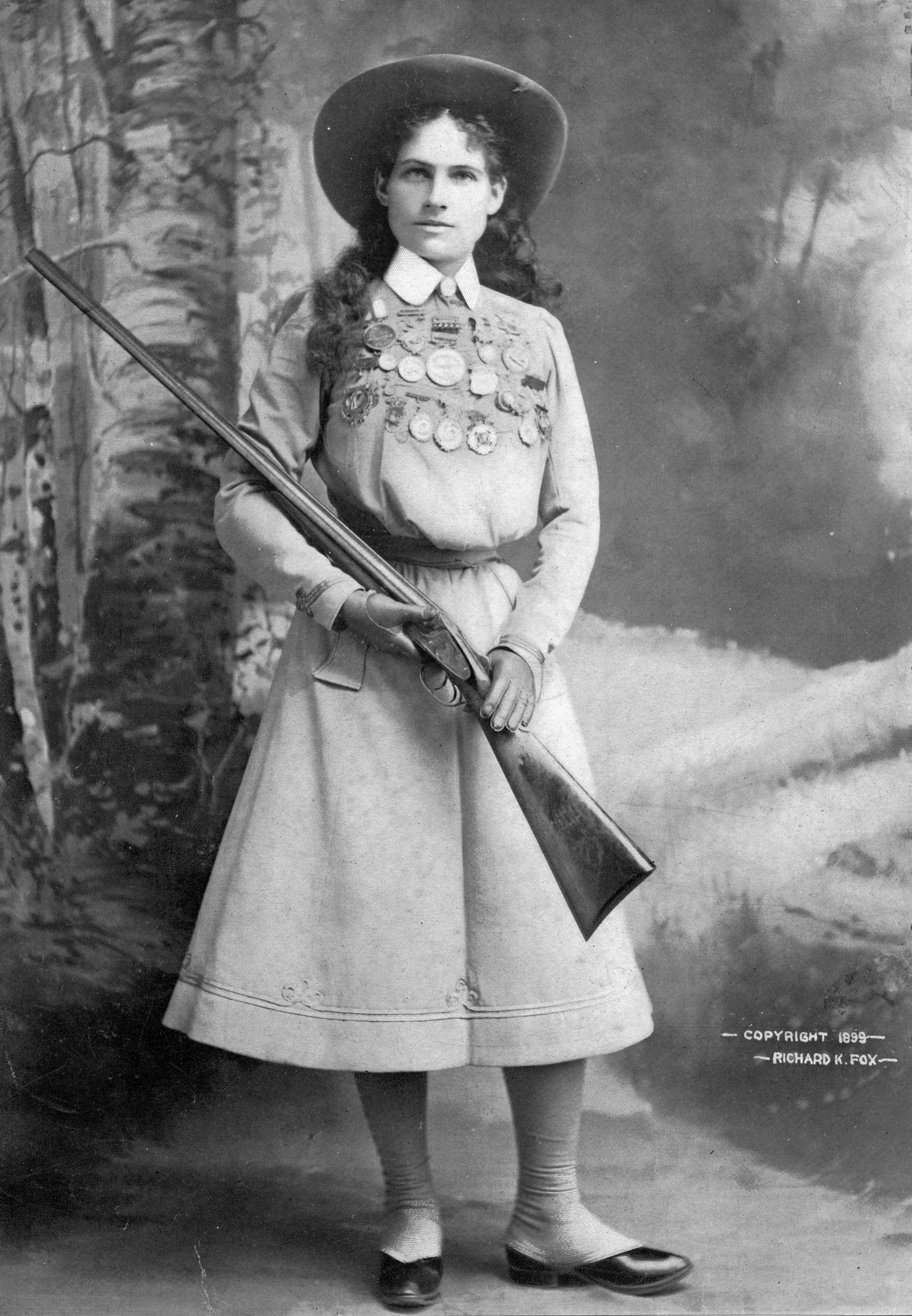
Oakley c. 1899

They joined Buffalo Bill's Wild West in 1885. At five feet tall, Oakley was given the nickname of "Watanya Cicilla" by fellow performer Sitting Bull, rendered "Little Sure Shot" in the public advertisements.

During her first engagement with the Buffalo Bill show, Oakley experienced a tense professional rivalry with rifle sharpshooter Lillian Smith. Smith was eleven years younger than Oakley, age fifteen at the time she joined the show in 1886, which may have been a primary reason for Oakley to alter her age as six years younger in later years due to Smith's press coverage becoming as favorable as hers. Oakley temporarily left the Buffalo Bill show but returned two years later, after Smith departed, in time for the Paris Exposition of 1889. This three-year tour cemented Oakley as America's first female star. She earned more than any other performer in the show, except Buffalo Bill himself. She also performed in many shows on the side for extra income. During her lifetime, the theatre business began referring to complimentary tickets as "Annie Oakleys". Such tickets traditionally had holes punched into them (to prevent them from being resold), reminiscent of the playing cards Oakley shot through during her sharpshooting act.

In Europe, she performed for Queen Victoria of the United Kingdom, King Umberto I of Italy, President Marie François Sadi Carnot of France, and other crowned heads of state. Oakley supposedly shot the ashes off a cigarette held by the newly crowned German Kaiser Wilhelm II at his request.

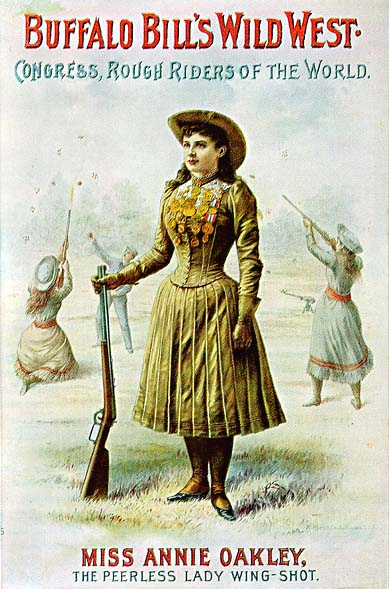
Buffalo Bill's Wild West poster

From 1892 to 1904, Oakley and Butler made their home in Nutley, New Jersey.

Oakley promoted the service of women in combat operations for the United States armed forces. She wrote a letter to President William McKinley on April 5, 1898, "offering the government the services of a company of 50 'lady sharpshooters' who would provide their own arms and ammunition should the U.S. go to war with Spain."

The Spanish–American War did occur, but Oakley's offer was not accepted. Theodore Roosevelt, did, however, name his volunteer cavalry the "Rough Riders" after the "Buffalo Bill's Wild West and Congress of Rough Riders of the World," of which Oakley was a major star.

In 1901 (the same year as McKinley's assassination), Oakley was badly injured in a train accident, but recovered after temporary paralysis and five spinal operations. She left the Buffalo Bill show, and in 1902 began a less taxing acting career in a stage play written especially for her, The Western Girl. Oakley played the role of Nancy Berry, who used a pistol, a rifle, and rope to outsmart a group of outlaws.

Throughout her career, it is believed that Oakley taught more than 15,000 women how to use a gun. Oakley believed strongly that it was crucial for women to learn how to use a gun, as not only a form of physical and mental exercise, but also to defend themselves. She said: "I would like to see every woman know how to handle guns as naturally as they know how to handle babies."

=== Film appearance ===
Annie Oakley, 1894, an "exhibition of rifle shooting at glass balls, etc.", in an Edison Kinetoscope movie

Buffalo Bill was friends with Thomas Edison, and Edison built the world's largest electrical power plant at the time for the Wild West Show. Buffalo Bill and fifteen of his show Indians appeared in two Kinetoscopes filmed September 24, 1894.

In 1894, Oakley and Butler performed in Edison's Kinetoscope film Annie Oakley, also known as "Little Sure Shot" of the "Wild West", an exhibition of rifle shooting at stationary and moving objects, which was filmed November 1, 1894, in Edison's Black Maria studio by William Heise. It lasted 21 seconds at 30 frames and 39 feet. It was the eleventh film made after commercial showings began on April 14, 1894.

=== Libel cases ===
In 1904, sensational cocaine prohibition stories were selling well. Newspaper magnate William Randolph Hearst published a false story that Oakley had been arrested for stealing to support a cocaine habit. The woman actually arrested was a burlesque performer who told Chicago police that her name was Annie Oakley.

Most of the newspapers that printed the story had relied on the Hearst article, and they immediately retracted it with apologies upon learning of the libelous error. Hearst, however, tried to avoid paying the anticipated court judgments of $20,000 (equivalent to $720,000 in 2025) by sending an investigator to Darke County, Ohio, with the intent of collecting reputation-smearing gossip from Oakley's past. The investigator found nothing.

Oakley spent much of the next six years winning all but one of her 55 libel lawsuits against newspapers.

== Later years and death ==
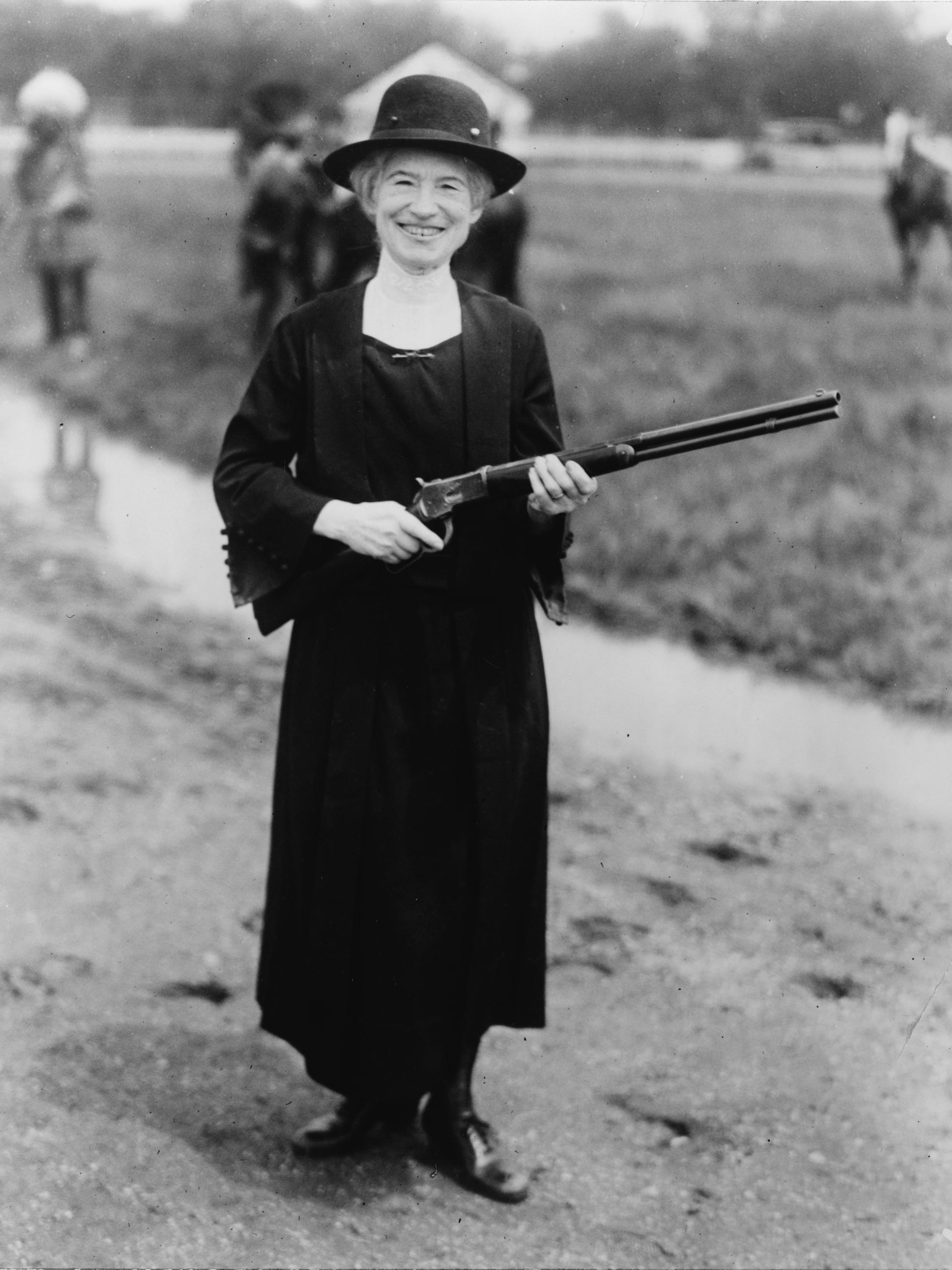
Oakley in 1922

In 1913, the Butlers built a brick bungalow style home in Cambridge, Maryland. It is known as the Annie Oakley House, and was listed on the National Register of Historic Places in 1996. In 1917, they moved to North Carolina and returned to public life.

After World War I broke out, Oakley reflected, "If I shot the kaiser, I might have saved the lives of several millions of soldiers. I didn't know then that he would swing the iron fist and shake the universe. Perhaps it was well for both of us that humans lack foresight". According to Butler, he sat down and wrote a letter to Wilhelm II, saying that Annie Oakley wanted to repeat the shot. The kaiser never replied.

Oakley continued to set records into her sixties and also engaged in extensive philanthropy for women's rights and other causes, including the support of young women she knew. She embarked on a comeback and intended to star in a feature-length silent movie. She hit 100 clay targets in a row from 16 yards (15 m) at age 62 in a 1922 shooting contest in Pinehurst, North Carolina.

In late 1922, the couple sustained injuries in a car crash that required Oakley to wear a steel brace on her right leg. She eventually performed again after more than a year of recovery, and she set records in 1924.

Oakley's health declined in 1925, and she died of pernicious anemia in Greenville, Ohio, at the age of 66 on November 3, 1926. She was cremated and her ashes buried at Brock Cemetery, near Greenville.

According to B. Haugen, Butler was so distraught by her death that he stopped eating and died eighteen days later in Michigan; he was buried next to her ashes. Kasper reports that Butler's death certificate gave senility as the cause of death. One rumor claims that Oakley's ashes were placed in one of her trophies and placed alongside Butler's body in his coffin. Both body and ashes were interred in the cemetery on Thanksgiving Day, November 25, 1926.

After her death, her incomplete autobiography was given to stage comedian Fred Stone, and it was discovered that her entire fortune had been spent on her family and her charities.

== Shooting prowess ==
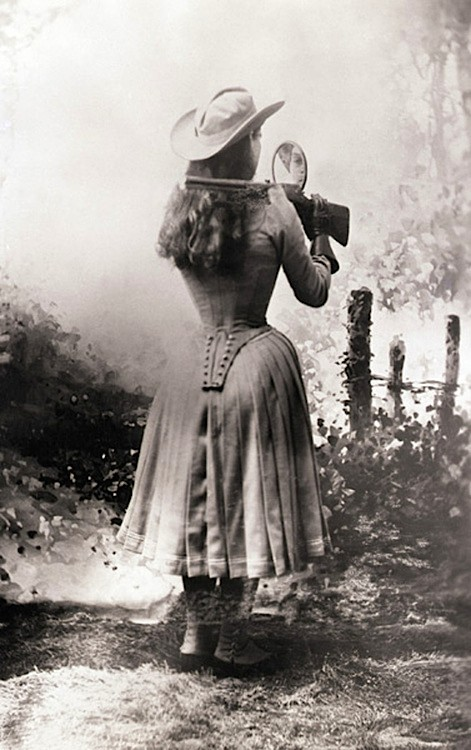
Oakley shooting over her shoulder using a hand mirror

Biographers, such as Shirl Kasper, repeat Oakley's own story about her first shot at the age of eight. "I saw a squirrel run down over the grass in front of the house, through the orchard and stop on fence to get a hickory nut." Taking a rifle from the house, she fired at the squirrel, writing later that, "It was a wonderful shot, going right through the head from side to side".

According to Encyclopædia Britannica:

Oakley never failed to delight her audiences, and her feats of marksmanship were truly incredible. At 30 paces she could split a playing card held edge-on, she hit dimes tossed into the air, she shot cigarettes from her husband's lips, and, a playing card being thrown into the air, she riddled it before it touched the ground.

=== Association with Sitting Bull ===
R. A. Koestler-Grack reports that, on March 19, 1884, she was being watched by Chief Sitting Bull when:

Oakley playfully skipped on stage, lifted her rifle, and aimed the barrel at a burning candle. In one shot, she snuffed out the flame with a whizzing bullet. Sitting Bull watched her knock corks off of bottles and slice through a cigar Butler held in his teeth.

Oakley and Sitting Bull purportedly met and bonded while working together on a Buffalo Bill show in Minnesota. Sitting Bull joined with Buffalo Bill after being paroled, having led the last major Indian uprising against the federal government; his status as a great warrior and leader was legendary worldwide by the time he and Oakley met. The former Indian Chief was so impressed with Oakley's skills that he offered $65 (equal to $2,329 today) for a photograph of them together. According to Oakley, the admiration and respect was mutual and only increased as they spent more time together. Sitting Bull felt Oakley must be "gifted" by supernatural means, in order to shoot so accurately with both hands. As a result of his esteem, Sitting Bull symbolically "adopted" Oakley as his daughter in 1884, naming her "Little Sure Shot," a title that Oakley went on to use throughout her career.

== Legacy ==
Oakley's worldwide stardom as a sharpshooter enabled her to earn more money than most of the other performers in the Buffalo Bill show. She did not forget her roots after gaining financial and economic power. She and Butler often donated to charitable organizations for orphans.

Oakley also proved to be a great influence on women. She urged that women serve in war, though President William McKinley rejected her offer of 50 woman sharpshooters for service in the Spanish–American War. Beyond this offer to the president, Oakley believed that women should learn to use a gun for its empowering image. Laura Browder discusses how Oakley's stardom gave hope to women and youth in Her Best Shot: Women and Guns In America. Oakley pressed for women to be independent and educated. She was a key influence in the creation of the image of the American cowgirl. Through this image, she provided substantial evidence that women are as capable as men when offered the opportunity.

A vast collection of Oakley's personal possessions, performance memorabilia, and firearms are on permanent exhibit in the Garst Museum and the National Annie Oakley Center in Greenville, Ohio. She has been inducted into the Trapshooting Hall of Fame, the National Cowgirl Museum and Hall of Fame, the National Women's Hall of Fame, the Ohio Women's Hall of Fame, and the New Jersey Hall of Fame. A statue of Oakley stands at the Annie Oakley Memorial Plaza in Greenville, Ohio.

== Further information ==
Oakley is described as a "Trailblazer" by the Scottish tour company Gallus Pedals with a bicycle being named after her. The website's bicycles commemorates the trailblazers in several different categories. Oakley is in the category "Women Who Redefined What Is Possible". According to the company's website, she is included because of her Glasgow connection through Buffalo Bill’s Wild West visits and the story that she learned to ride a bike while in Scotland.

== Filmography ==
Year	Title	Role	Ref.
1894	Annie Oakley	Self	
1910	Actors' Fund Field Day	Self	

== See also ==
- Belle Starr
- Calamity Jane
