= Glenroy Bros., (no. 2) =

- Directed by: William K. L. Dickson
- Starring: The Glenroy Brothers
- Production company: Edison Studios
- Release date: 1894

Glenroy Bros., (no. 2), also known as Comic Boxing: The Glenroy Brothers, is an 1894 American silent film from Edison Studios. It is 26- or 18-second long and shows the Glenroy Brothers boxing. The film, considered a comedy, was made by early summer 1894. K.W. Johnson calls it "beatings framed as slapstick".
