= John Slavin =

Scottish footballer

Personal information
- Place of birth: Carnoustie, Scotland
- Position: Half back

Senior career*
Years	Team	Apps	(Gls)
- Raith Rovers
1925–1926	Hearts		
1927–1930	New York Nationals	114	(5)
1930–1932	→ New York Giants	57	(3)
1933–	Brookhattan		
- * Club domestic league appearances and goals

John Slavin (born Carnoustie, Scotland) was a Scottish football half back who played professionally in Scotland and in both the first and second American Soccer Leagues.

Slavin played for Raith Rovers and may have played for Arbroath F.C. and on loan to Forfar Athletic. In 1925, Slavin joined Hearts for the 1925–1926 season. In 1927, Slavin signed with the New York Nationals of the American Soccer League. Although the Nationals finished tenth in the league standings, it won the 1928 National Challenge Cup. In 1930, Charles Stoneham, owner of the Nationals renamed the team the New York Giants. The team collapsed in 1932 and the league followed soon after. In 1933, the second American Soccer League was formed and Slavin moved to Brookhattan in the new league. He played with Brookhattan until at least 1945 when he was a substitute in the team's 1945 National Challenge Cup victory over the Cleveland Americans.
