= Enoch J. Rector =

American film director

- Born: October 9, 1863; Parkersburg, West Virginia, US
- Died: January 26, 1957 (aged 93)
- Education: West Virginia University
- Occupation: Inventor
- Known for: Kinetoscope
- Children: Ann Elizabeth Rector

Enoch J. Rector (October 9, 1863 – January 26, 1957) was an American boxing film promoter and early cinema technician. He was a partner in Woodville Latham's Kinetoscope Exhibition Company (later the Lambda Company) during the mid-1890s, working with Latham and his sons Otway and Grey, as well as fellow cinema technicians William Kennedy Laurie Dickson and Eugene Lauste.

Cinema historian Terry Ramsaye later claimed that Rector, during his association with Latham, invented the 'Latham loop', a key feature of modern cinema cameras and projectors, in 1895. However, in 1927 Dickson stated unequivocally that Lauste was responsible for this important invention. Using this technique, Rector created the 90-minute documentary film The Corbett-Fitzsimmons Fight (1897), filmed in an early widescreen process in 63mm film, with an aspect ratio of about 1.75:1.

== Biography ==
He was born near Parkersburg, West Virginia in 1863. He later attended West Virginia University. He married Jesse Fremont Leach (1871–1956), a designer of glass furniture. She was named after her mother's friend at boarding school, Jessie Benton, later wife of Charles Fremont. Jesse had a sister, Anna Russell Leach (1860–1952), a writer for The New York Times. He had a daughter, Anne Elizabeth Rector (1899–1970) who was married to Edmund Duffy.
