= Veriscope =

Early film studio

Veriscope was an early film studio which produced The Corbett-Fitzsimmons Fight (1897), directed by Enoch J. Rector.

Veriscope was also a large, human-powered camera created by Enoch Rector. The camera operators were inside the camera, which was a tight wooden structure.

The term is also used for the widescreen 63mm film format used to produce this feature film, which was about 100 minutes long.

== See also ==
- List of film formats
