= Eidoloscope =

The Eidoloscope was an early motion picture system created by Eugene Augustin Lauste, Woodville Latham and his two sons through their business, the Lambda Company, in New York City in 1894 and 1895. The Eidoloscope was demonstrated for members of the press on April 21, 1895, and opened to the paying public on Broadway on May 20.

== History ==
Originally called the Pantoptikon (also spelled 'Panoptikon'), it is perhaps the first widescreen film format, with an aspect ratio of 1.85 to 1. It had a film gauge of 51 mm and an aperture of 37 mm by 20 mm. It was instrumental in the history of film in that it created what became known as the "Latham loop", which are two loops of film, one on each side of the intermittent movement, which act as a buffer between continuously moving sprockets and the jerky motion of the intermittent movement. This relieved strain on the filmstrip and so enabled the shooting and projection of much longer motion pictures than had previously been possible.

== Early beginnings ==
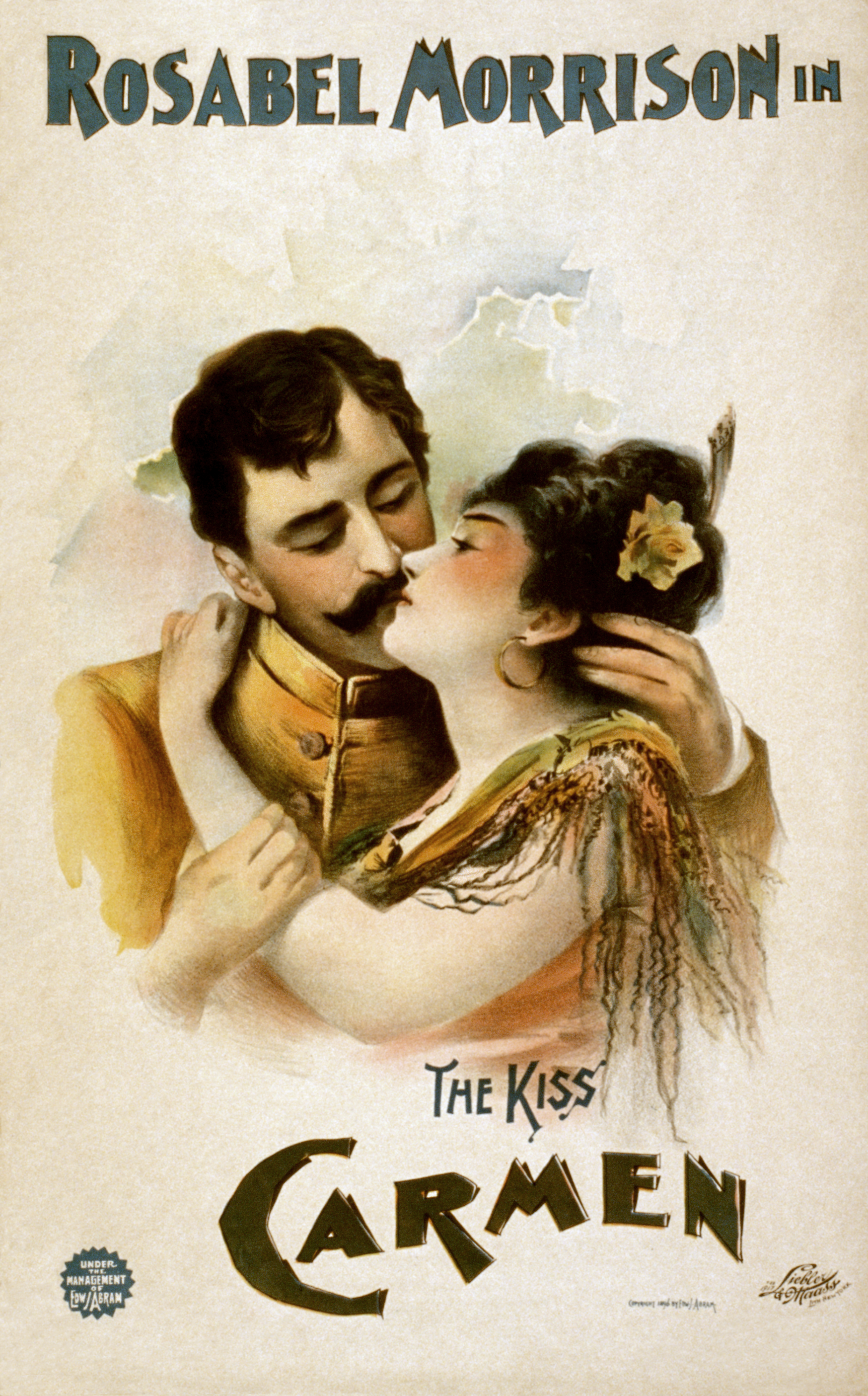
Using the Eidoloscope, a 15-minute film of a bullfight was integrated into the last act of Carmen (1896), a stage dramatization of Prosper Mérimée's novella starring Rosabel Morrison. The production was probably the first stage-and-screen hybrid in the US.

Woodville Latham, one of the creators of the Eidoloscope, was originally a chemistry professor. Woodville's sons were in the business of showing boxing matches and would frequently hear complaints from patrons about how someone should make a machine that projects film on a screen. That way, more people could view the film at the same time, as they could not with the kinetoscope. It was a much more efficient method of exhibition that would reduce startup costs, since each parlor would need only one machine instead of six. W.K.L Dickson, an employee of Thomas Edison at the same time, joined the Lathams and their project to help raise finances and the knowledge of how to move forward in the business. The Eidoloscope was engineered mainly by Lauste, who also assisted with the design of the Latham loop. (Later, Dickson would credit Lauste with the loop's invention).

The Lathams named their company after the Greek letter for "L": lambda or λ. However, the company did not last long since disputes over the copyrights from The Eidoloscope Company shareholders brought the Lathams' demise in 1896.

== See also ==
- List of film formats
