= The Corbett–Fitzsimmons Fight =

1897 film by Enoch J. Rector

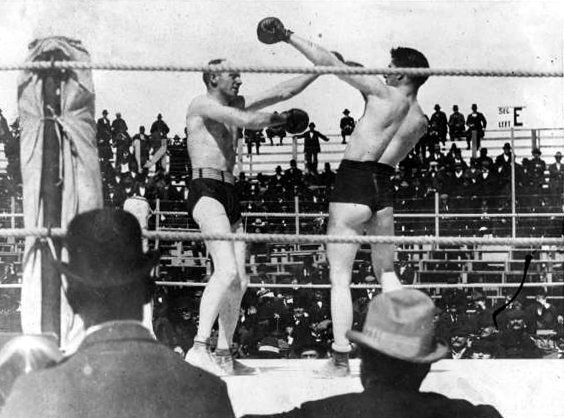
- Still photograph of the fight Fitzsimmons on left; Corbett on right
- Directed by: Enoch J. Rector
- Produced by: William Aloysius Brady
- Starring: James J. Corbett; Bob Fitzsimmons
- Cinematography: Enoch J. Rector
- Distributed by: Veriscope
- Release date: May 22, 1897
- Running time: c. 90–100 minutes
- Country: United States
- Box office: $100,000–$750,000

The Corbett–Fitzsimmons Fight is an 1897 documentary film depicting the 1897 boxing match between James J. Corbett and Bob Fitzsimmons in Carson City, Nevada on March 17, 1897. Directed by Enoch J. Rector, it originally ran for more than 100 minutes, making it the longest film released to date.

The technology that allowed this is known as the Latham loop. Rector claimed to have invented the device, but its invention is disputed. He used three such equipped cameras placed adjacently and filming on 63mm nitrate film. Only fragments of the film survive. The known fragments were transferred in the 1980s from a print owned by Jean A. LeRoy of New York City, the transfer done on a specially built optical printer to convert the film to 35mm film. The film was also the first to be shot in widescreen, with an aspect ratio of about 1.65:1. According to Dan Streible, The Corbett–Fitzsimmons Fight is "one of the earliest individual productions to sustain public commentary on the cinema.", while Luke McKernan declared, "it was boxing that created the cinema."

As noted by Seth Abraham, the president of Time Warner Sports, it was the first motion picture to ever depict the championship prizefight. Its nationwide screenings can be regarded as the first pay-per-view media event in boxing history, for the fight produced more income in box office than in live gate receipts, it was immensely profitable, and the picture served as a long-standing model for future amusement entrepreneurs. Prizefighting was illegal in 21 states, and many cities and states tried to ban the film, mostly unsuccessfully.

In 2012, the film was selected for preservation in the National Film Registry at the Library of Congress, being deemed "culturally, historically, or aesthetically significant".

== Synopsis ==
The Corbett– Fitzsimmons Fight (1897)

A 19-minute part of the film

The film no longer exists in its entirety; however, contemporary sources indicate that it included all fourteen three-minute rounds of the event, a dramatic shift from each round having been presented as a separate attraction. Also unusual, and historically exceptional, is a five-minute introduction depicting former champion John L. Sullivan (whom Corbett defeated in 1892) and his manager, Billy Madden, introducing the event and referee George Siler, followed by both boxers entering the ring in their robes.

The one-minute rest periods between each round were captured on film, and when it was reissued it included a ten-minute epilogue of the empty ring at the end of the fight, into which members of the audience eventually stormed. Even with these approximate timings, the film ran a minimum of 71 minutes, and sources generally report that it exceeded 90 or 100 minutes. The film climaxes with Fitzsimmons hitting Corbett in the solar plexus for a knockout and Corbett crawling outside the space of the camera so that he is not visible above the waist.

== Production ==
Enoch J. Rector had been an employee of the Kinetoscope Exhibition Company, which filmed Corbett and Courtney Before the Kinetograph (1894) in six one minute rounds, each exhibited via the Edison Kinetoscope as a separate peep show for a separate fee. Some time after leaving the company, Rector arranged for the film with boxing promoter Dan Stuart. Stuart offered $10,000 to the winner of the bout in an agreement signed by both boxers on 4 January 1897. Corbett, along with his fans, was eager to win back the title he had vacated to Peter Maher, who then lost it to Fitzsimmons in Mexico. Producer William Aloysius Brady got an agreement from Rector that 25% of the proceeds of the film would go to him and Corbett; Fitzsimmons and his manager, Martin Julian, would receive $13,000. Fitzsimmons was outraged upon learning of the deal, and the terms were renegotiated. Under the new terms, each boxer and his manager would take 25%, with Rector, Stuart, and Samuel J. Tilden Jr (who had left Kinetoscope with Rector in a battle over who invented the Latham loop) dividing the remaining 50%.

Birt Acres, a British cinematographist of Barnet, England, who shot footage of the 1896 Henley Royal Regatta on 70 mm film using a ratio wider than 1.33 × 1, sought an opportunity and sent a cameraman to the United States to cover the event, but Rector had already secured an exclusive right to picture the event.

The film was shot in widescreen format on 2 3/16-gauge film stock. Rector brought 48,000 feet (15 km) of film stock, the largest amount that had ever been brought on location, and exposed 11,000 feet (3.4 km) of it. The night before the match, Stuart cut the ring down from 24 to 22 feet (7.3 to 6.7 m) for the sake of the camera, but the referee noticed this and Stuart was forced to change it back.

Wyatt Earp was a reporter for The New York World at the time, which published his commentaries on the fight on March 14 and March 18. He disagreed with referee George Siler's decision when Fitzsimmons allegedly hit Corbett in the jaw, which should have resulted in a foul, coming after a knockout blow to Corbett's solar plexus. The World heavily promoted the film, and the day after the film's release, printed a statement from Fitzsimmons, "I don't believe there is a single picture in it that will substantiate those [claims] published in The World."

== Exhibition ==
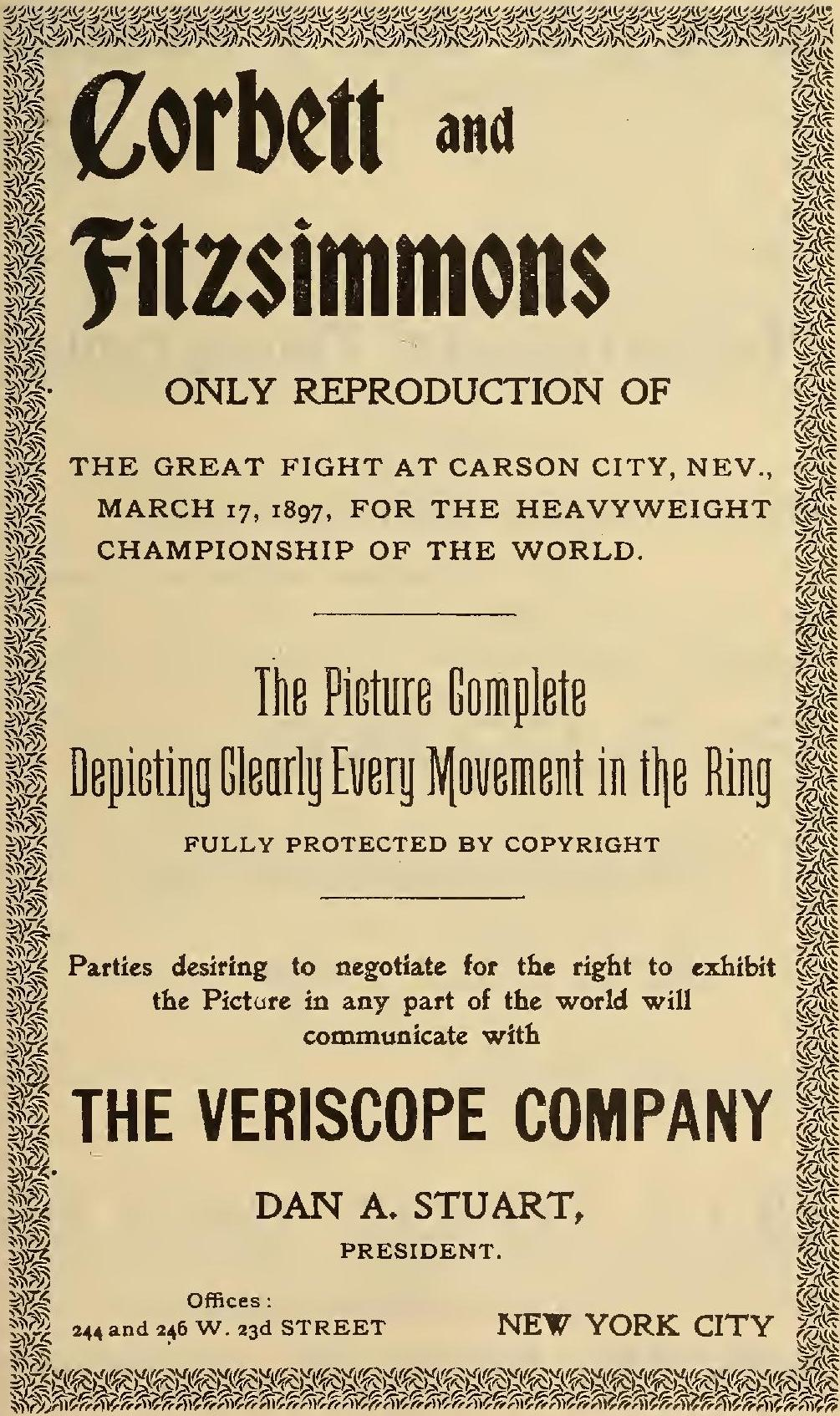
"Corbett and Fitzsimmons" "ONLY REPRODUCTION OF THE GREAT FIGHT AT CARSON CITY, NEV. MARCH 17, 1897" 1898 ad in the Police Gazette Sporting Annual

The film premiered on May 22 at the New York Academy of Music and played into June, where it was presented with live running commentary. In total, eleven companies toured with the film.

Local debuts:

- May 31, 1897 (Boston)
- June 6, 1897 (Chicago)
- June 7, 1897 (Buffalo)
- June 26, 1897 (Philadelphia)
- July 3, 1897 (Pittsburgh)
- July 13, 1897 (San Francisco)
- July 27, 1897 (Portland, Oregon)
- September 27, 1897 (London, Royal Aquarium Theatre)
- December 26, 1897 (Cardiff)
- April 1898 (Dublin)
- November 11, 1898 (Tucson)

When the film was shown in Coney Island, it was advertised under the title Corbett's Last Fight.

== Reception ==
Brady estimated the film's net profit at $750,000. Film scholar Charles Musser claims that the film made a more modest $100,000.

=== Female hype on content ===
The film is also notable because, at the time, women were essentially prohibited from viewing boxing matches which were seen as a "stag" activity, but they were not prohibited from viewing this film. Much attention was given to the fact that Rose Julian Fitzsimmons, Bob's wife, viewed the live match from a box with other female companions, such as dancers Loïe Eiler and Ida Eiler, while women otherwise did not mix with the crowd. As much as 60% of the Chicago audience was composed of women. As Miriam Hansen put it, "it afforded women the forbidden sight of male bodies in seminudity, engaged in intimate and intense physical action." She argues a connection between the female reception of this film and the large female audience for Rudolph Valentino two decades later, who was typically shown stripped to the waist and beaten in his films.

=== Some negative perceptions ===
Streible calls this into debate, and suggests that the size of the female audience is predominantly self-generated boilerplate. The film had been strongly opposed by the Women's Christian Temperance Union, which tried to get legislation passed to prevent the film's transmission by mail. Their protests of fight films were second only to suffrage on their national agenda. Several state and local authorities tried to ban the reproduction of pugilist films, but this did not come to a vote. An editorial in The New York Times declared, "It is not very creditable to our civilization perhaps that an achievement of what is now called the 'veriscope' that has attracted and will attract the widest attention should be the representation of a prizefight." Rector claimed that the film had "every defect known to photography" in the San Francisco Examiner in attempt to quell the protests against a film falsely deemed unusable. Because the audience for prizefighting was "perceived to be a rowdy, less desirable class of patron[,] Veriscope recruited more genteel audiences. Ladies were officially invited." Promotion for the film avoided the term "prizefight" with its connotations of violence, and promoted it as a "sparring contest." Veriscope was trying to run counter to press that had presented the story as feminine resistance to "stag" entertainment.

=== Related Matinee idol play ===
Corbett and Brady had toured as fictionalized versions of themselves in a play by Charles T. Vincent called Gentleman Jack, which contributed to Corbett's reputation as a matinee idol for women, as the play was presented to mixed audiences. Brady had honed Corbett's image as an educated gentleman in order to improve his appeal to bourgeois audiences. Streible notes that this reputation as a matinee idol and "ladies' man image," in addition to the bare-gluteus trunks, about which he could find no contemporary commentary, may have drawn women audiences to the film.

Musser, in his discussion of subsequent feature-length fight films, that subsequent to The Corbett–Fitzsimmons Fight, no boxing film drew comparable audience numbers and that women stopped attending in significant numbers., reinforcing Streible's theories of hype and female interest in Corbett the matinee idol.

=== Generational difference in appreciation among females ===
Streible found two contemporary accounts of the film that were written by women. One of these was by "Matinee Girl," a reporter for the New York Dramatic Mirror (who may or may not have been a real woman), who reported in the June 12, 1897 issue viewing the film with some shame, admiration for Corbett, and disappointment at his loss. He points out that she name-drops Brady, which identifies her as an "insider." The other article he found by a woman was "Alice Rix at the Veriscope" from the Examiner Sunday Magazine. Alice Rix, known for a particular brand of "sob sister" journalism (along with Nellie Bly and Dorothy Dix), claimed that when she viewed the film at the Olympia Theatre, she counted only sixty women in an audience of a thousand, and found the dress circle empty. She observed that they were mostly "dressed down," and that all were escorted by men and appeared uninterestedly watching a bloodless spectacle. She proceeded to describe the entire medium of motion pictures as "awful."

Streible reproduces a drawing that accompanied Rix's article depicting two women in attendance of the film. One appears to be younger and leaning forward, watching the film with interest, while the other, apparently an older woman acting as chaperon, is turned away from the screen and uninterested in the film, even dismayed at the younger woman's interest. He notes that "respectable women" had been allowed to attend theater for only about a generation, and that Broadway did not actively court women or families as audience members until 1865. The pre-war audience had primarily been men and prostitutes. By 1897, women were only beginning to see theater as a legitimate social space. Musser notes that The Boston Herald went so far as to call the film the "proper" thing for ladies to see. Streible, citing the research of Antonia Lant, contrasts paintings of women in theater audiences by Mary Cassatt, Claude Monet, and Berthe Morisot with this drawing by making it appear that the fact that women were allowed to look was more important than that the act of looking being allowed to them. That the younger woman is leaning indicates that what she is looking at is, in fact, what is important to her rather than the simple privilege of looking.

=== Possible homoerotic interpretation ===
Streible also touches on potential homoerotic interest in the film, citing work on strongman photos by Thomas Waugh. He concludes that prizefighting, as opposed to physical culture, was not associated with aesthetics or male beauty, Corbett excepted. The aesthetics of the boxing scene were better known for broken jaws and cauliflower ears, such that one's sexual orientation probably had little bearing on one's appreciation of the film, and of a sport surrounded by homophobic press.

=== Irish interest ===
Denis Condon discusses how class, rather than gender, affected audience response to the film in Dublin. The significance of the film's reception in Ireland derives from the fact that Corbett was Irish by birth and often contrasted to the English-born Fitzsimmons, who himself was the son of an Irish blacksmith, a fact that no newspaper noted at the time. He notes a surprising absence, in response to the film, of ethnic partisanship, in spite of the St. Patrick's Day day of the fight, the Irish-English tension of 1898, and heavy antagonism of the Irish-American Corbett and the English Fitzsimmons, who is elsewhere described as Anglo-Australian. Audiences put aside political fervors and suspended their knowledge, pretending that they were watching a live performance. Irish women did not attend, possibly because The Lyric Hall, where the film was shown, often featured live boxing and sexually risqué material, and thus considered an inappropriate place for a respectable woman, while another theatre nearby was regarded as more family-friendly.

== Legacy ==
Quick to compete, Siegmund Lubin created a film the same year known as Reproduction of the Corbett and Fitzsimmons Fight, staged on a rooftop with two freight handlers from the Pennsylvania Railroad. Each round was shot on only 50 feet of 35 millimeter film stock at a very slow speed. Veriscope threatened to sue, but there was no law broken. Audiences did not appreciate the facsimile, even though it was advertised as such. The Arkansas Vitascope Company showed the film. The June 1897 issue of Phonoscope reprinted an article from The Little Rock Gazette that stated that the audience was so angered by Lubin's film that it was turned off after the third round for lack of an audience. The August–September issue of Phonoscope noted that the manager of the opera house turned over his $253 profits to a state senator who, after time to deliberate, eventually refunded the patrons' money.

Ramsaye notes that The Corbett–Fitzsimmons Fight was the singular film that pushed the social status of film, then uncertain, into the low-brow. This is not consistent with the admission prices. Prices for reserved seats ranged from twenty-five cents up to one dollar, assuring middle and upper class attendance.

Rector intended to go into long form dramatic films, but was dismissed as a crank, although he continued to be involved in the technical side of motion picture production.

The Corbett So-Called Dollar was issued, which is now very rare, made from brass, with Corbett's bust facing right with 13 stars around it on the obverse, and wreath of leaves and berries, tied to a bottom with ribbon "For the Championship of the World. Carson City Nev. March 17, 1897." on the reverse.

== See also ==
- List of boxing films
- List of early wide-gauge films
- List of film formats
- List of 70 mm films
