= Adolph Friedrich Kunike =

Austrian lithographer and publisher

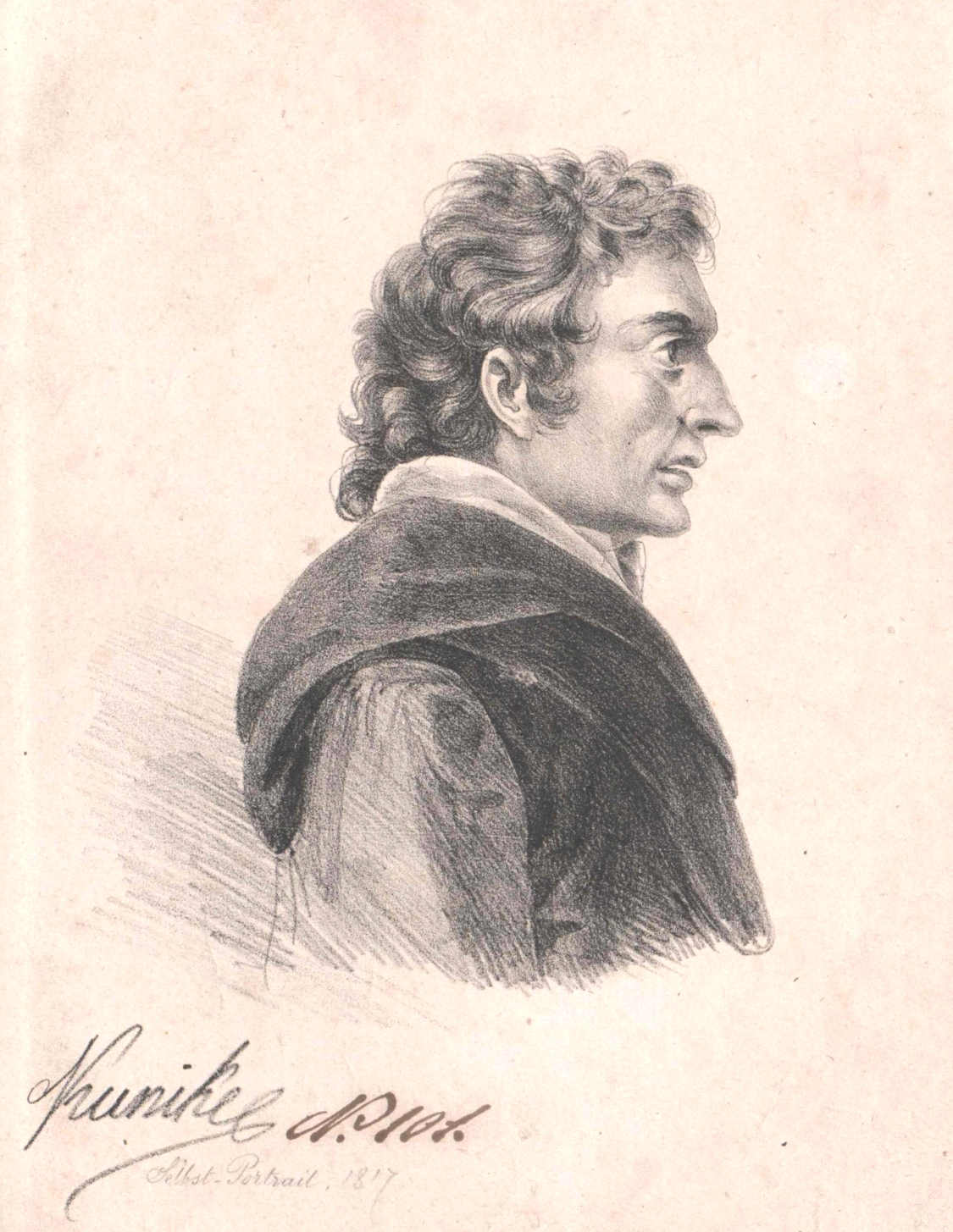
Self-portrait (1817)

Adolph Friedrich Kunike (25 February 1777 – 17 April 1838) was a German-born Austrian lithographer, illustrator and publisher.

== Biography ==
Kunike was born on 25 February 1777 in Greifswald. His father is believed to have been Adolf Eberhard Kunike, a clerk and arithmetic teacher at the Greifswald primary school. Little is known of his early life and education.

In 1804, after apparently having received a degree in philosophy, he studied art at the Academy of Fine Arts Vienna. From 1808 to 1810, he studied history painting in Rome. In 1816, he made the acquaintance of Alois Senefelder, the inventor of lithography. Shortly after, he helped the publisher Carl Gerold (1783–1854) set up his printing works to handle lithographs.

A year later, he opened his own lithographic "institute" in Vienna. After several years of producing his own works, he limited himself to managing the company and acquiring other artist's works; especially landscapes and portraits. Perhaps his best known publication is Zwey hundert vier und sechzig Donau-Ansichten nach dem Laufe des Donaustromes von seinem Ursprung bis zu seinem Ausflusse in das Schwarze Meer ... (Two hundred and sixty-four Danube views following the course of the Danube stream from its origin to its outflow into the Black Sea ...), which was published in three editions (1820, 1824, 1826). A majority of the pictures were the work of Jakob Alt.

His company took students and made contributions to the local production of paper; bypassing the expensive papers imported from Switzerland. He died on 17 April 1838 in Vienna. After his death, his widow operated the company, until her death in 1845, when it was acquired by Matthias Trentsensky, one of Kunike's former students.

== Sources ==
- Biography, from the Biographisches Lexikon des Kaiserthums Oesterreich @ WikiSource
- Wacha: "Kunike Adolf Friedrich". In: Österreichisches Biographisches Lexikon 1815–1950 (ÖBL). Vol. 4, Austrian Academy of Sciences, Vienna 1969, p. 351.
- Nora Keil (1982). "Kuni(c)ke, Adolf". Neue Deutsche Biographie (in German). Vol. 13. Berlin: Duncker & Humblot. p. 297. (full text online).
