= Anne Elizabeth Rector =

American painter

- Born: June 26, 1899; Wheeling, West Virginia
- Died: February 17, 1970 (aged 70); San Juan, Puerto Rico
- Education: Art Students League of New York
- Spouse: Edmund Duffy
- Parent: Enoch J. Rector

Anne Elizabeth Rector (June 26, 1899 – February 17, 1970) was an American artist.

Rector was the daughter of Enoch J. Rector and she attended the Art Students League of New York studying under John French Sloan. Ann also studied landscape painting under Andrew Dasburg. She married Edmund Duffy and they moved to New York City in 1948, when her husband began work for the Saturday Evening Post. She later headed Rector Studios that manufactured glass top tables. Her daughter Sara Anne Duffy was the first wife of designer Ivan Chermayeff, the son of Serge Ivan Chermayeff.

Rector's childhood diaries were published in 2004. They had been found many years after Rector's death and described her life for the year of 1912.
