= Matthias Trentsensky =

Austrian publisher (1790–1868)

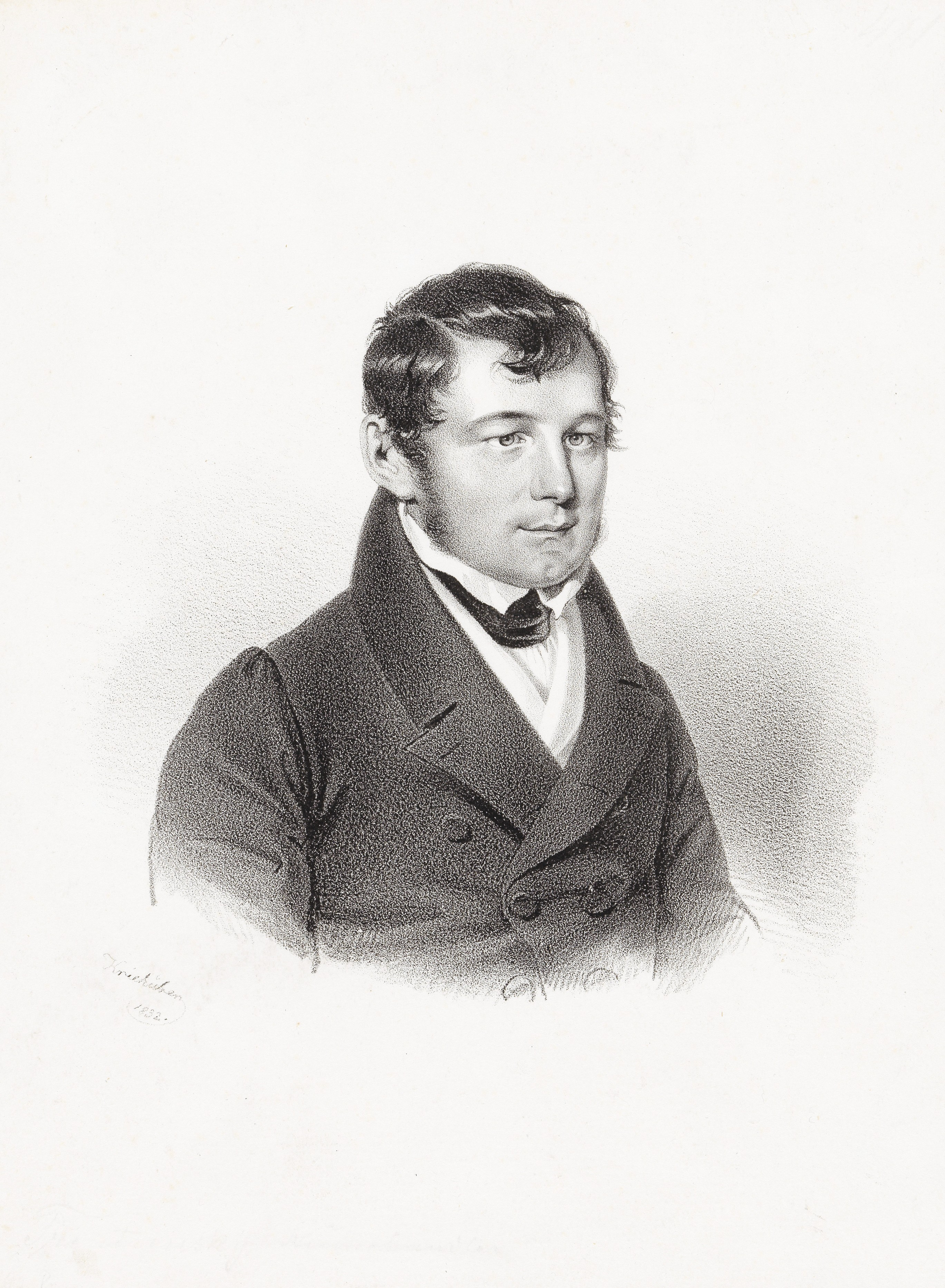
Lithograph of Trentsensky by Josef Kriehuber, 1832

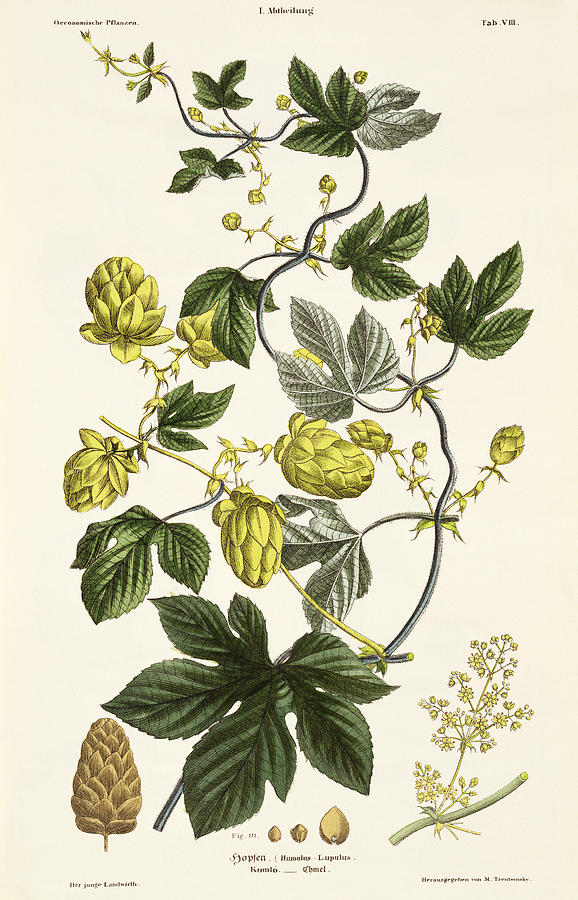
Humulus lupulus (1845) published by Matthias Trentsensky

Matthias Trentsensky or Mathäus Trentsensky (30 August 1790 – 19 March 1868) was an Austrian publisher and engraver of Hungarian origin. He published colour plates of soldiers' uniforms, folk and theatre costumes, toy or paper theatres, and educational posters or wall charts of plants and animals.

== Biography ==
Matthias Trentsensky was born on 30 August 1790 in Vienna, son of Mathäus Trentsensky (1754–1818), He served in the Austrian army, and took part in the campaigns of 1814–1815 against the French. In 1815 he retired with the rank of lieutenant (infantry). He studied engraving art and worked in the lithographic workshop of Adolph Friedrich Kunike in Vienna, and in 1819, together with his younger brother Joseph Trentsensky (1794–1839), opened his own lithographic publishing and office supply company (Papierwarenhandlung).

They released a significant number of lithographs depicting the uniforms of the Austrian army and battle scenes, as well as theatrical costumes, images of animals and popular prints for children. They also sold the popular "Mandelbogen" for children, which were embossed toy proscenium arches to be cut out or painted. From 1837 the company was run by Matthias alone and after his death by his widow.

The printing house was initially located in Ungargasse then in Erdbergstraße. The warehouse and sales rooms started in Zwettlhof and from 1842 in Domherrenhof. From 1820, Joseph was part owner of a stationery and artist's supplies shop on the Hoher Markt, and opened his own Nuremberg goods shop in 1829. In 1822 he received a patent for the production of lithographs using zinc plates, and in 1829 one for wooden blocks.

Trentsensky was married to Maria Anna Kurzweil, who died in 1874. Matthias Trentsensky died in Vienna on 19 March 1868.
