= Edmund Duffy =

American cartoonist

- Born: March 1, 1899; Jersey City, New Jersey
- Died: September 12, 1962 (aged 63); Manhattan
- Occupation: Cartoonist
- Employer(s): The Baltimore Sun (c1924-c1948); Saturday Evening Post (c1948-c1962)
- Known for: Three Pulitzer Prize for Editorial Cartooning
- Spouse: Anne Elizabeth Rector

Edmund Duffy (March 1, 1899 – September 12, 1962), was an American editorial cartoonist. He grew up in Jersey City, New Jersey, eventually moving to metropolitan areas. Duffy did not attend high school, but instead went into the Art Students League of New York. Duffy's career took him to London, Paris, New York, and finally to Baltimore, where he spent the majority of his professional career working for The Baltimore Sun.

Duffy won three Pulitzer Prizes for Editorial Cartooning in 1931, 1934, and 1940. Duffy began working for the Baltimore Sun in 1924, when he was only about 25 years old, and he received high praise from the famous journalist H.L. Mencken.

== Journalism career ==
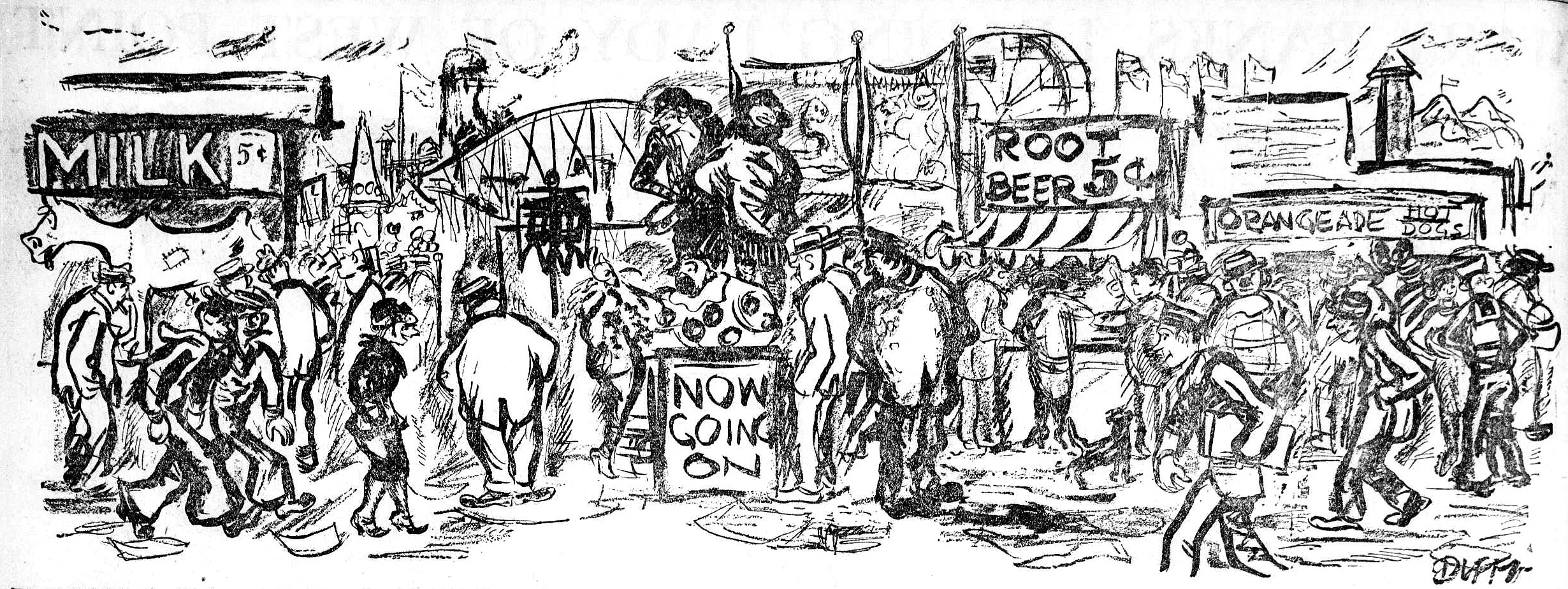
A 1922 cartoon of Coney Island in the New-York Tribune

Duffy first came into the journalism field with his submission of a page of sketches for Armistice Day. The sketches were put into the New York Tribune in the Sunday section. Duffy worked on a variety of assignments in order to save up money, then launching his European career. He moved to London and worked for the London Evening News. Duffy worked in Paris for a few years, and he finally returned to the United States in 1922. He worked for two years with both the New York Leader and the Brooklyn Eagle.

The longest period of his career began in 1924 when he began working for The Baltimore Sun. Duffy worked there until 1948, in order to work a less tiring job, working for the Saturday Evening Post. Duffy drew numerous noteworthy cartoons, approaching major issues and incidents, such as lynching and the Ku Klux Klan, but also the famous Monkey Scopes Trial of 1925.

=== Denouncing racism through art ===
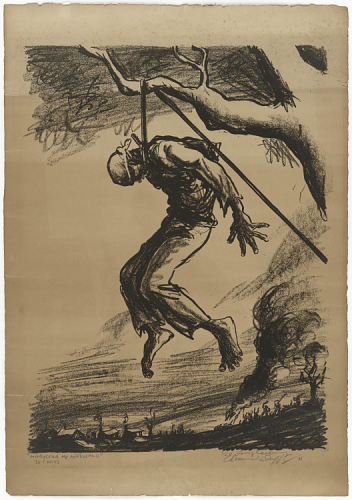
Maryland, My Maryland!, a lithograph from ca. 1931, depicts the lynching of Matthew Williams.

Duffy was known for his daring nature in relation to his work. H.L. Mencken saw promise in his work and “Duffy with his sometimes savage artwork, did the kind of thing that delighted Mencken, who loved nothing more than to ‘stir up the animals’”. Duffy was not afraid to please Mencken, and held nothing back He was one of the few people of his time that would boldly approach the topic of racism. He blatantly condemned lynching and the actions of the KKK. This was one of his main issues that he approached during his career. During the time period that Duffy worked it was not popular to advocate against racism, so Duffy was civil rights before it was a wide movement in the United States. S.L. Harrison, a late professor of Communication at the University of Miami, wrote that Duffy “displayed uncommon vigor in attacking the Ku Klux Klan”.

== Scopes Trial ==
Just a year after Duffy began working for The Baltimore Sun, 1925, a famous trial began in Tennessee. Tennessee had passed a law, the Butler Act, barring teachers against the topic of evolution in the classroom, but one biology teacher, John T. Scopes, ignored the law and taught his students evolution. Scopes decided that the students should learn evolution, even if it went against the teachings of the bible. Since the trial was popular and a nationwide topic, Mencken took a staff from The Sun, including Duffy, to cover the trial. “[Edmund Duffy’s] graphic artwork played a significant role in the public’s perception of the trial proceedings reported in the pages of The Sun, then one of America’s most influential newspapers”. His cartoons brought more attention to the issue, as he derided Tennessee for crushing knowledge in one of his more notable cartoons from the trial called ‘A Closed Book in Tennessee.’ In this cartoon, Duffy shows a man, representing Tennessee, holding a sign that says “Fundamentalists Only Wanted as Teachers.” The man is standing on top of the book of knowledge, holding it shut. Duffy knew that this powerful cartoon would cause a great response, but that is exactly what Mencken wanted and expected from him. Many more of his cartoons from the trial held the same message, in which he was publicly shaming Tennessee for the law, the trial, and the verdict. Mencken once said that with a good cartoonist he would not need a whole editorial staff, and a great cartoonist he found in Duffy.

== Pulitzer Prizes ==
Over Edmund Duffy's career, he won three Pulitzer Prizes, which is a lot compared to other recipients over the years. His three prize winning cartoons are the following:

“An Old Struggle Still Going On” (1931) This cartoon references the anti-communism era that began in the 1920s and 1930s. At the time, communism was seen as being anti-religion, which is what Duffy conveys in the cartoon.

“California Points with Pride!” (1934) This cartoon is one of Duffy's many anti-lynching pieces. This one, however, deals with white on white lynching. In California, people took two kidnappers from prison and lynched them in a park, but the Governor praised the people that did the lynching. Duffy condemned the Governor in this cartoon.

“The 'Outstretched Hand'” (1940) In this cartoon, Duffy's topic is Adolf Hitler and his brutality. By the time the cartoon was drawn, Germany had already invaded Poland, and Duffy shows Hitler's broken promises and peace offerings. Hitler's hand drips with blood in the image.

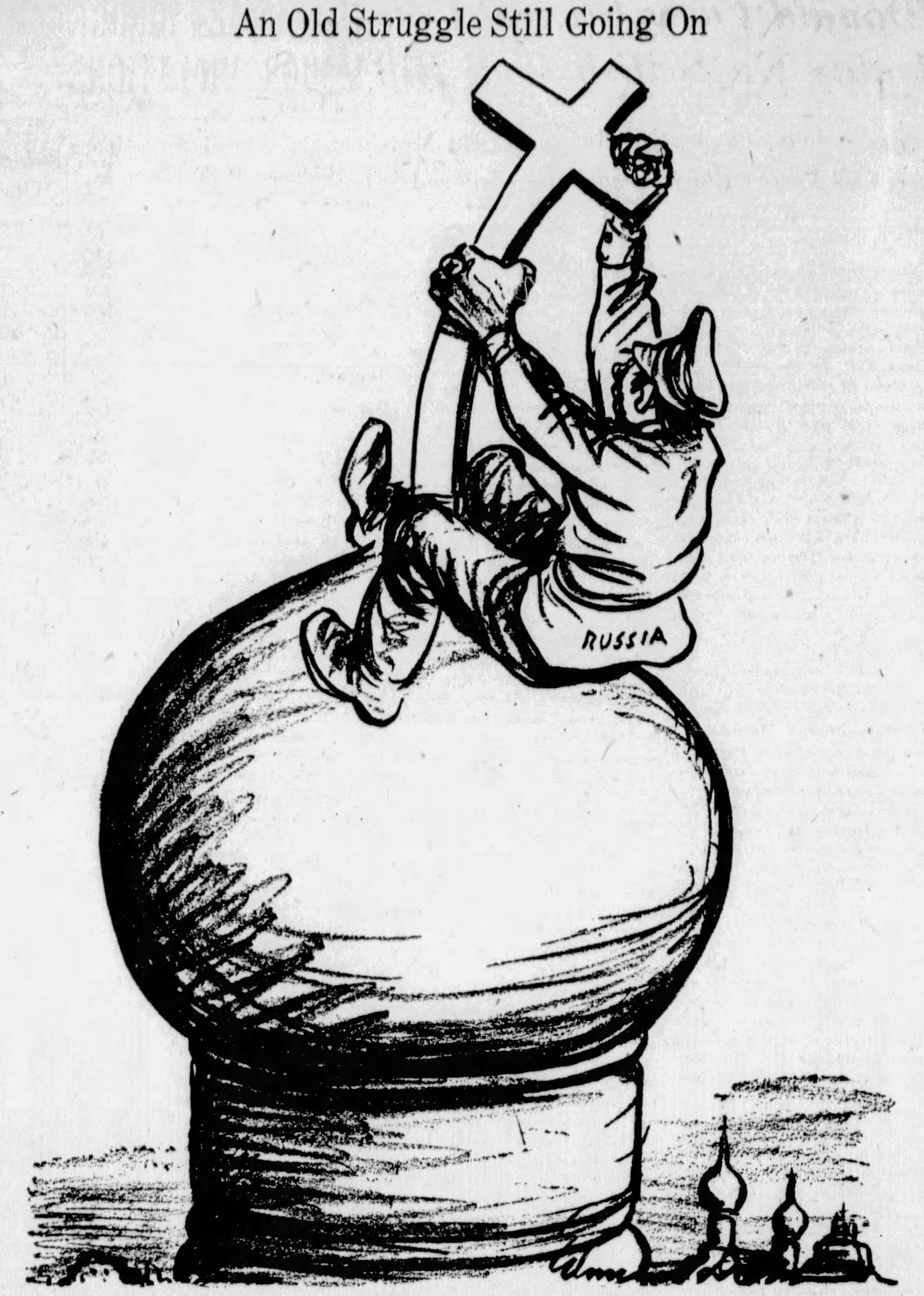
"An Old Struggle Still Going On"

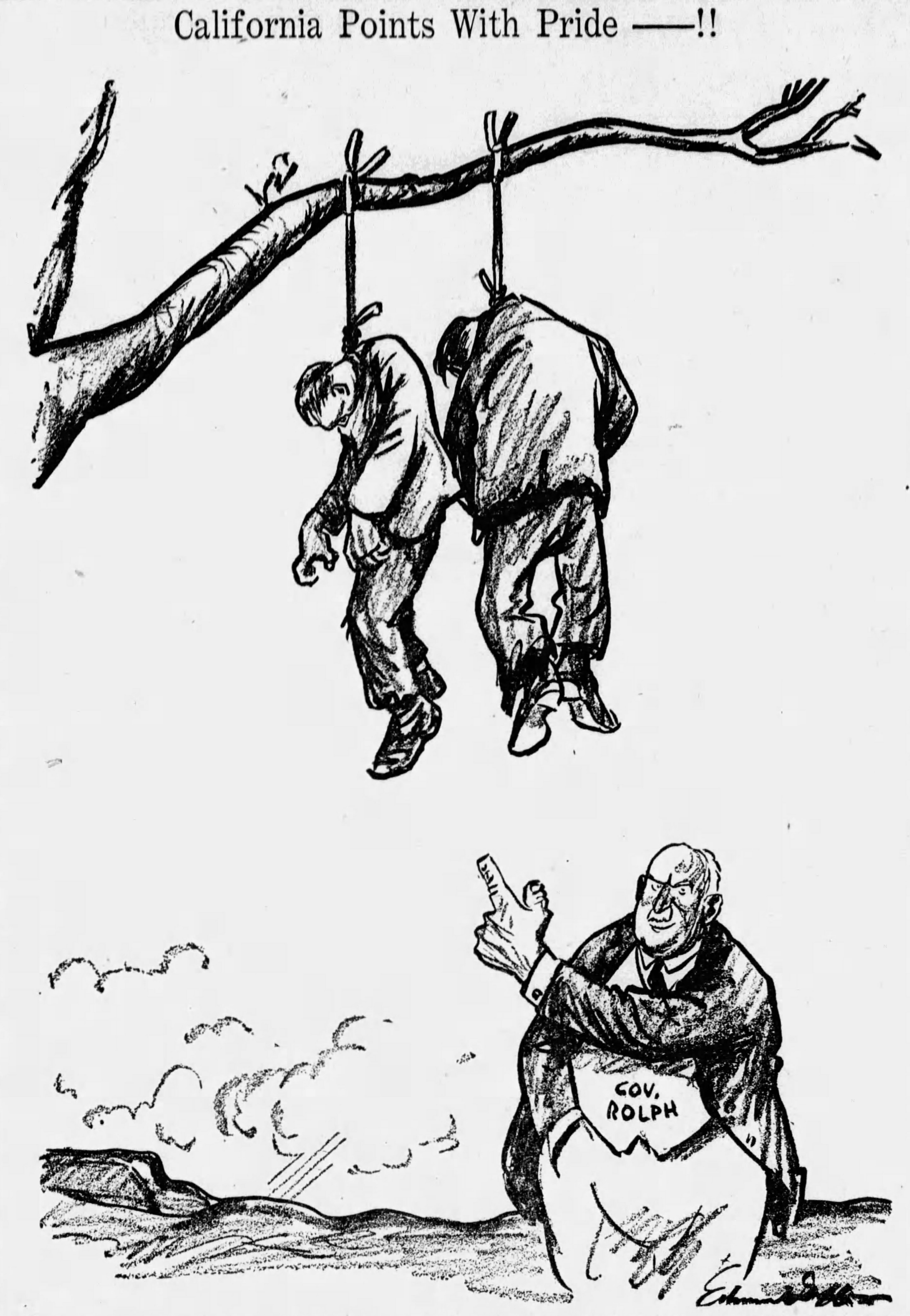
"California Points With Pride!"

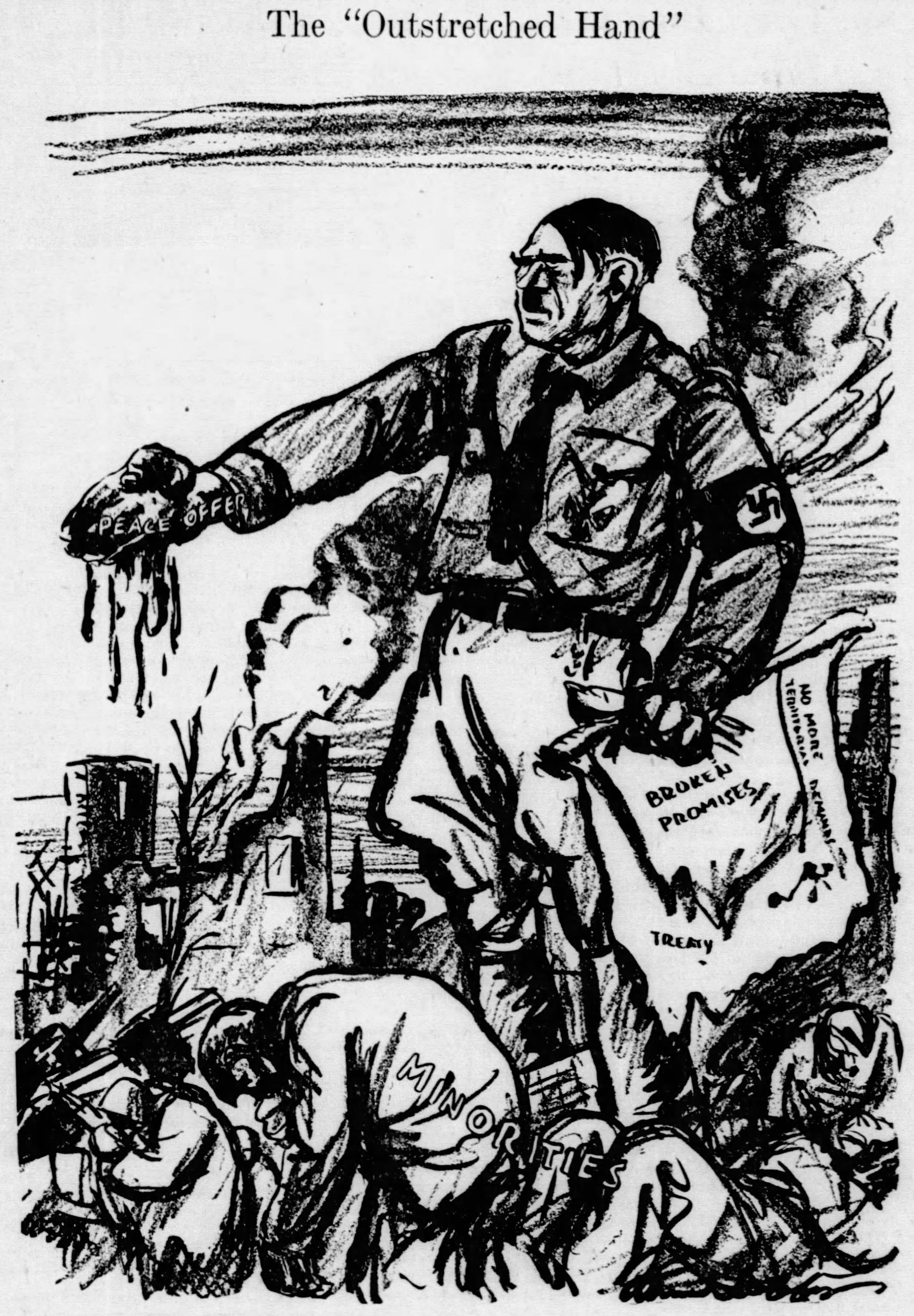
"The 'Outstretched Hand'"
