= Eugene Augustin Lauste =

French inventor

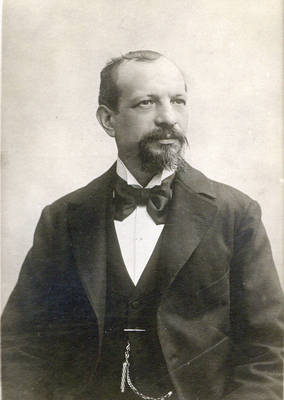

Eugène Augustin Lauste (17 January 1857 in Montmartre, France – 27 June 1935 in Montclair, New Jersey) was a French inventor instrumental in the technological development of the history of cinema.

== Life ==
By age 23 Lauste had filed 53 French patents. He emigrated to the United States in 1886 and started working at the Edison Laboratories where he met French-born William Kennedy Laurie Dickson. Lauste occasionally contributed to the development of the leading predecessor to the motion picture projector, the Kinetoscope, though he was never Dickson's chief assistant. Lauste left Edison in 1892.

Lauste also worked on an idea for a combustible gasoline engine; he did develop a working model in the 1890s but gave up when told that such a noisy device would never be widely used. He then worked with Major Woodville Latham, for whom he engineered the Eidoloscope and assisted with the design of the Latham loop. (Later, Dickson would credit Lauste with the loop's invention.)

The Eidoloscope was demonstrated for members of the press on 21 April 1895 and opened to the paying public on 20 May, in a lower Broadway store with films of the Griffo-Barnett prize fight, taken from Madison Square Garden's roof on 4 May. Thanks to the Latham loop inside the camera, the entire fight could be continuously shot on a single reel of film. He held regular displays of the pictures that summer in a Coney Island tent.

He joined the American Biograph Company in 1896 and remained there for four years before moving to Brixton, England. In 1904 he prepared his first sound-on-film model. On 11 August 1906 he (along with Australian Robert R. Haines and Briton John S. Pletts) applied for a British patent; their application was granted patent No. 18057 in 1907 for "a process for recording and reproducing simultaneously the movements or motions of persons or objects and the sounds produced by them," i.e., a strip of 35 mm celluloid film containing both image frames and a sound strip. In 1911 he exhibited a sound film in the United States, possibly the first-ever American showing of a movie using sound-on-film technology. Before he could market his system more widely, though, World War I intervened.

From 1928 until his death, Lauste was a consultant for Bell Telephone Laboratories. With his wife, Melanie, he had a son, Emile, and two stepsons, Clement and Harry E. LeRoy.

== See also ==
- Ernst Ruhmer
- Photographophone

== Sources ==
- Eyman, Scott (1997). The Speed of Sound: Hollywood and the Talkie Revolution 1926–1930. New York: Simon & Schuster (chapter 1 available online). ISBN 0-684-81162-6
- Musser, Charles (1990). The Emergence of Cinema: The American Screen to 1907. New York: Charles Scribner's Sons. ISBN 0-684-18413-3.
