= Woodville Latham =

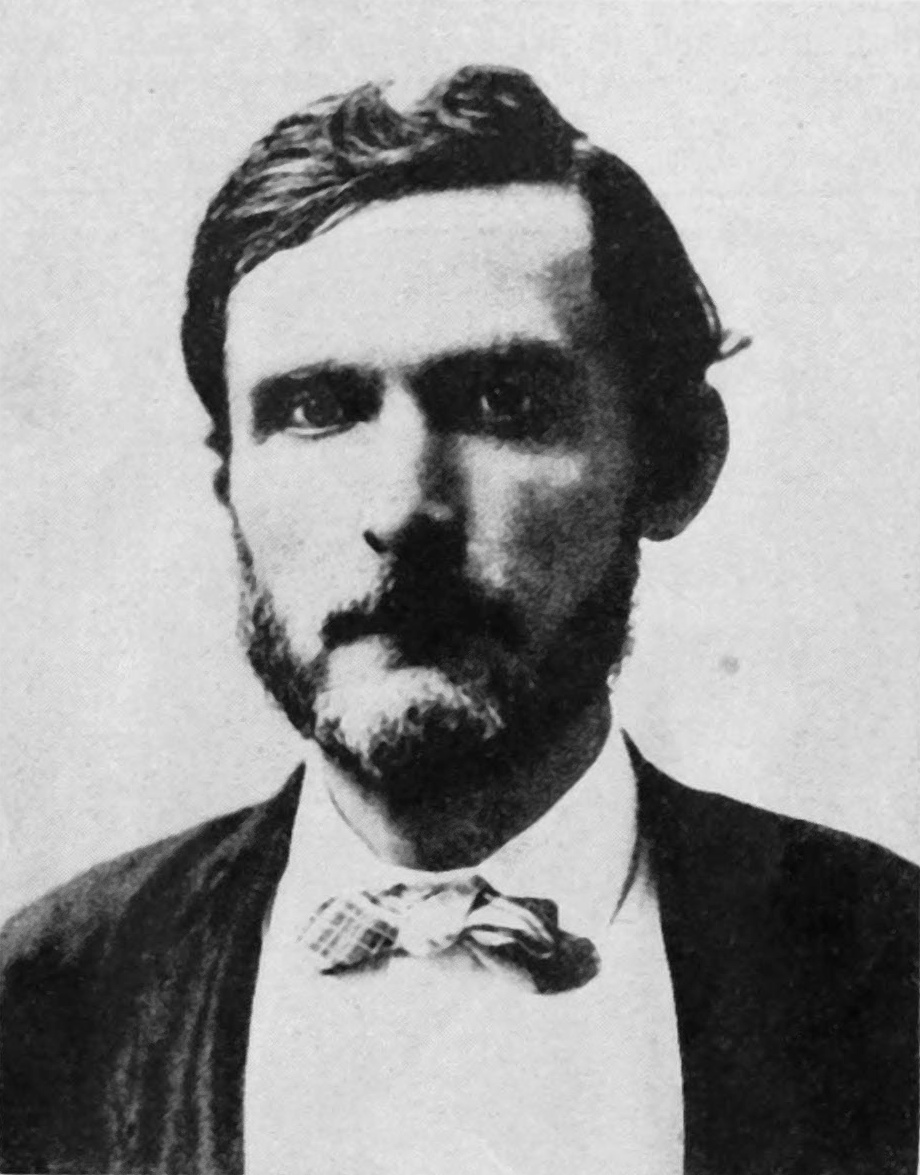
Woodville Latham, in an undated photo from a 1922 article on the history of motion pictures

Major Woodville Latham (1837–1911) was an ordnance officer of the Confederacy during the American Civil War and professor of chemistry at West Virginia University. He was significant in the development of early film technology.

Woodville Latham was the father of Grey Latham and Otway Latham, owners of a kinetoscope parlor in New York City. In December 1894 Latham and his two sons formed the Lambda Company at 35 Frankfort Street, employing Eugène Lauste, a former Thomas Edison employee, as well as motion picture pioneer William Kennedy Dickson. Dickson would not leave Edison's employ until April 1895 and initially lent his expertise to the Lathams in secret. The Eidoloscope was demonstrated for members of the press on April 21, 1895, and opened to the paying public on May 20, in a lower Broadway store with films of the Griffo-Barnett prize boxing fight, taken from Madison Square Garden's roof on May 4.

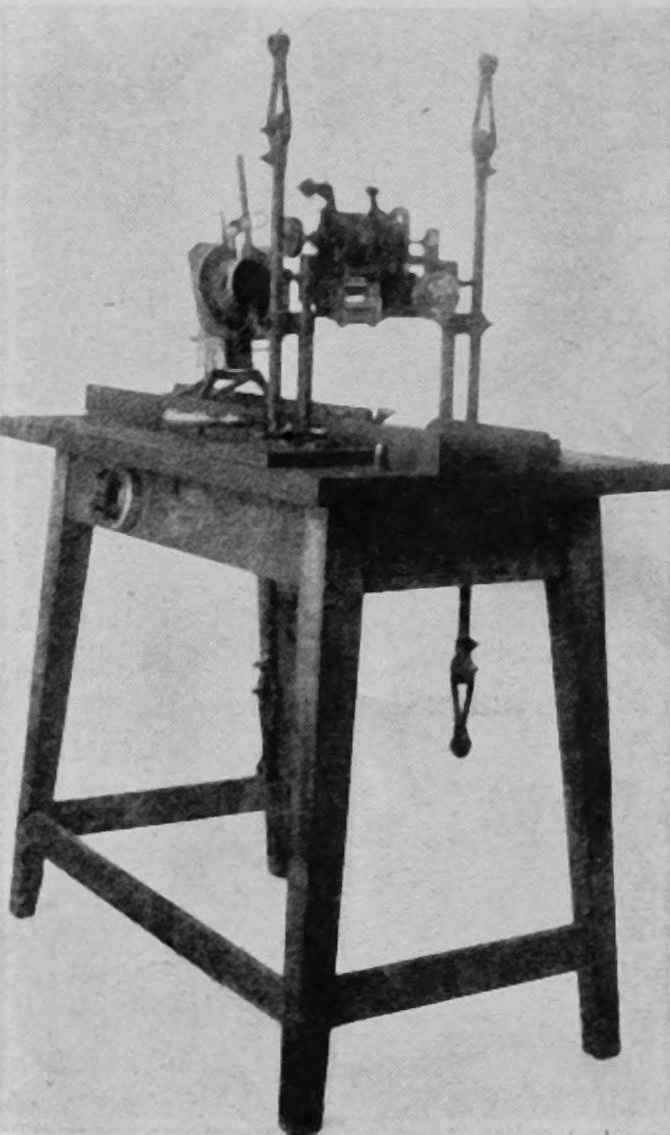
One of Latham's early projection machines

In 1898 the Lathams abandoned motion pictures and soon lost their patents. Major Latham outlived his sons; by 1910 both Otway and Grey, who are said to have been hedonistic in nature, had died.

Latham, aided by the collaboration of Dickson and Lauste, is notable for the invention of the Latham loop inside movie cameras and projectors, a significant development in the history of cinema because it allowed motion pictures to be continuously shot and projected for a much longer period than the one-minute films of Thomas Edison's kinetoscope. Shortly before his death in 1911, Latham testified regarding the 'Latham loop' at a patent hearing.
