= Latham loop =

Film projection tool

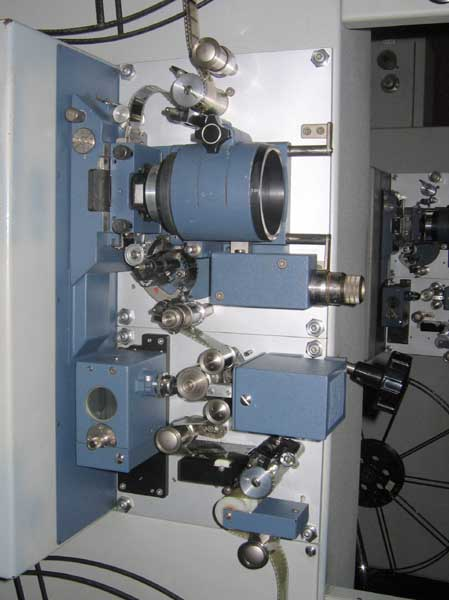
the Latham loop in this projector's film path is seen above the lens, coming out of the feed sprockets at top center

The Latham Loop is used in film projection and image capture. It isolates the filmstrip from vibration and tension, allowing movies to be continuously shot and projected for extended periods.

Invention of the Latham loop is usually credited to film pioneers William Kennedy Laurie Dickson and Eugene Lauste. Both men worked with Woodville Latham, developing a motion picture camera and projector in 1895. Dickson later acknowledged Lauste as inventor of the loop, though rival claims were made in support of another Latham associate, engineer Enoch J. Rector, who used the technology to shoot an hour-and-a-half-long documentary film, The Corbett-Fitzsimmons Fight, in 1897.

Woodville Latham applied for a patent on June 1, 1896. In his patent application, Latham wrote,

In order that these parts [of the film projector] may operate as described, it is essential that the loop of slack film be maintained at all times ready for the intermittingly-acting device and also that the slack-manipulating and the intermittingly-moving devices be positively driven by mechanism which will absolutely insure the presence of the slack and the accurate movement of the film. The reason these parts and their arrangement and method of operation are such important and valuable features of the invention is because their action is necessarily exceedingly rapid, and if the intermittingly-feeding mechanism were heavy, so as to have much inertia, or if any considerable portion of the film or either of the reels which support it were stopped and started at each transition from picture to picture there would be such strain brought to bear on the sprocket-holes in the film as would speedily tear it adjacent to such holes, thus ruining it...

By 1905, virtually all motion picture projectors used the Latham loop. The patent expired in 1913.

When Thomas Edison excluded his competitor Biograph from licensing Edison's key motion picture patents in 1907, Biograph retaliated by purchasing the patent for the Latham loop. In a patent infringement suit by Edison against Biograph, a federal court upheld the validity of the Latham patent.
