= Antonia Dickson =

British writer, lecturer, concert pianist

- Born: c. 1854
- Died: August 29, 1903
- Occupation(s): writer, lecturer, and concert pianist
- Notable work: History of the Kinetograph, Kinetoscope, and Kinetophonograph (co-written with William Kennedy Dickson)
- Relatives: William Kennedy Dickson (brother)

Antonia Isabella Eugénie Dickson (c. 1854 – August 29, 1903) was a writer, lecturer, music composer, and concert pianist. With her brother, William Kennedy Dickson, she authored the History of the Kinetograph, Kinetoscope, and Kinetophonograph, considered the first book on the history of film, and a biography of Thomas Edison.

== Biography ==
Antonia Dickson was a classically-trained concert pianist, considered a child prodigy. At 12 years old, she performed with an orchestra in Leipzig. She trained in conservatories in Leipzig and Stuttgart, and then performed in France, Scotland, and at the Crystal Palace Park in London. At 17, she began writing for Chambers' Journal of Popular Literature, Science, and Art, and remained a regular contributor throughout her life.

Dickson passed music exams given by Trinity College London and, in January 1879, she was made an associate of the College of Organists. At the time, she was the only woman to pass the exam and the third woman to be made an associate.

Dickson moved to the United States with her mother, sister, and brother in May 1879. Her mother died about two months after they arrived. The siblings settled in Petersburg, Virginia, where Dickson gave a concert in 1882. They then moved to New York, where William gained employment with Thomas Edison in 1883.

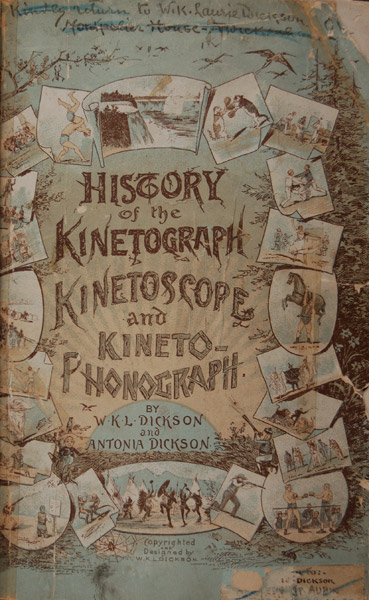
Cover of History of the Kinetograph, Kinetoscope, and Kinetophonograph by W.K.L. Dickson and Antonia Dickson

In the 1890s, Dickson and her brother collaborated on various projects. She wrote a poem, "Indian Lullaby to the Pale Faces," that he illustrated.^{: 281} In 1894, they co-authored The Life and Inventions of Thomas A. Edison, and in 1895, they co-authored History of the Kinetograph, Kinetoscope, and Kinetophonograph, considered the first book on the history of film.

Dickson also lectured on music in 1894 and 1895, first at her home and then at the Shepard School of Music in Orange, New Jersey. She published one lecture from a series of twelve on the paintings of great masters in 1896.^{: 280-1}

Dickson never married, and lived with William and his wife Lucie until she became ill in 1903. Antonia Dickson died on August 29, 1903.^{: 598-9}

== Partial bibliography ==
- "Nine Hundred and Fifty Miles by Telephone," Cassier's Magazine, November 1892
- The Life and Inventions of Thomas A. Edison, with W. K. L. Dickson (T. Y. Crowell and Co., 1894)
- History of the Kinetograph, Kinetoscope, and Kinetophonograph, with W. K. L. Dickson (Albert Bunn, 1895)
- "Wonders of the Kinetoscope," Frank Leslie's Popular Monthly, February 1895
- "Listening to the Voices," Orange Chronicle, December 1896^{: 280-1}
