= Home entertainment system =

Home entertainment system may refer to:

- Home cinema, or home theatre, a home entertainment system that reproduces a movie theater experience and mood, using video and audio equipment
- Home theatre PC, or media center appliance, a device that combines capabilities of a personal computer with a software application supporting video, photo, music playback, and sometimes video recording functionality

== See also ==
- Home entertainment (disambiguation)
- Home theater (disambiguation)
