= Home theater (disambiguation) =

Home theater is a combination of audio and video components designed to recreate the experience of seeing movies in a theater.

Home theater may also refer to:

- Home theater in a box, an integrated package of audio and video components
- Home theater PC, when a computer is part of a home theater

== See also ==
- Home entertainment system (disambiguation)
