= Georges Méliès in culture =

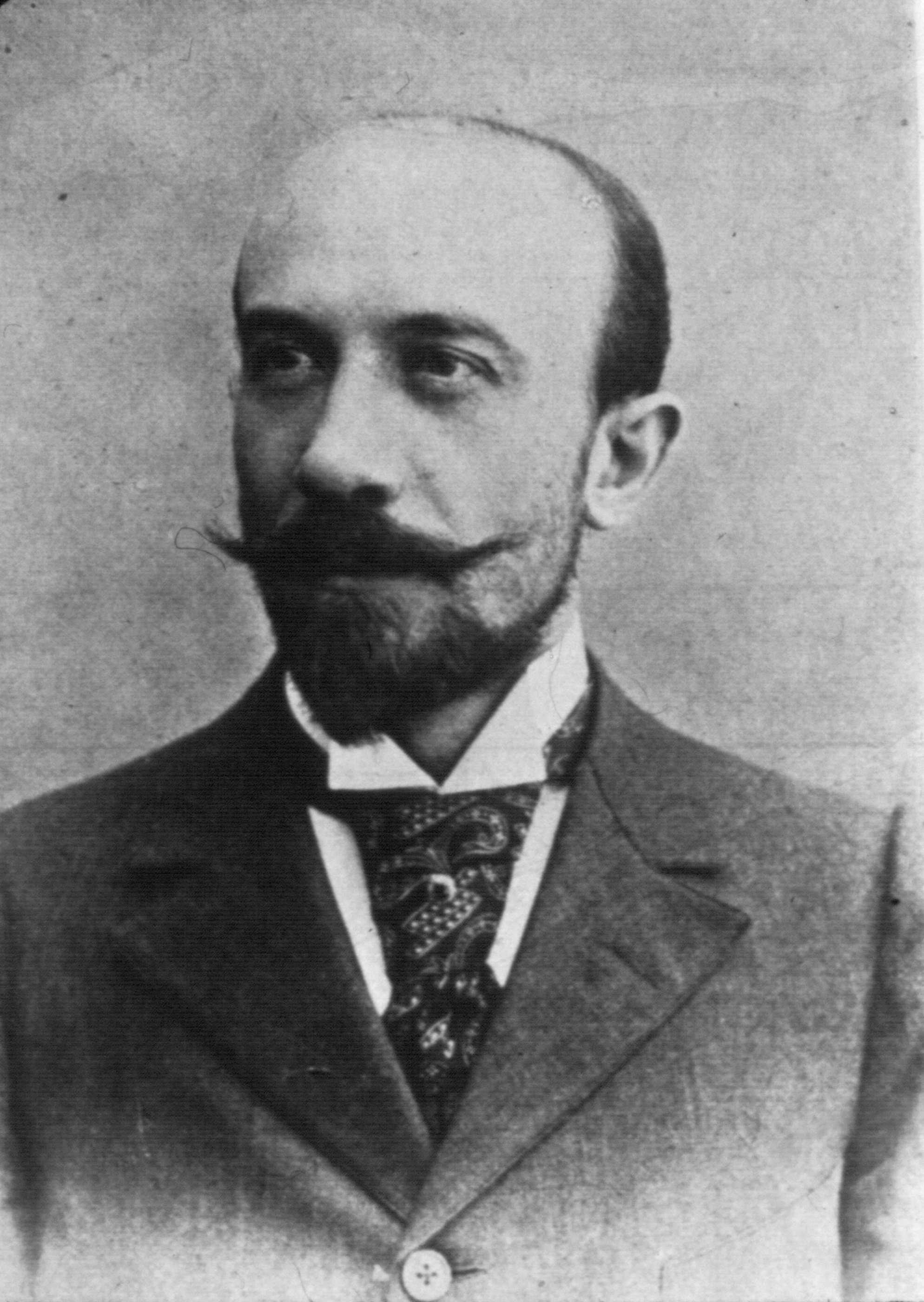
Georges Méliès

The life and works of the French filmmaker Georges Méliès (1861–1938), including his famous short film A Trip to the Moon, have been referenced many times in creative works, including the following examples.

== General ==
- Le Grand Méliès (1952): The life of Georges Méliès is told in this biodrama, directed by Georges Franju. André Méliès plays the part of his own father.
- In Jean-Luc Godard's 1967 film, La Chinoise, Guillaume (Jean-Pierre Léaud) prefaces a lecture on current events with a discussion of who, in French cinema, was the true originator of the filming of current events, the Lumière brothers or Méliès. Guillaume makes the argument that Méliès, rather than the Lumières, was the true originator of current event films in French cinema.
- The Grateful Dead's 1989 music video "Foolish Heart" is dedicated to Méliès, and uses clips from The Kingdom of the Fairies.
- Queen's 1995 music video "Heaven for Everyone" features clips from Méliès' Le Voyage dans la Lune and The Impossible Voyage.
- The music video for "Tonight, Tonight" by The Smashing Pumpkins is a tribute to Méliès and A Trip to the Moon. It has been called one of the greatest music videos of all time.
- In 2003 The New York Guitar Festival commissioned the jazz composer/guitarist Bill Frisell to compose scores for five early films by Georges Méliès, including A Trip to the Moon (1902) and The Impossible Voyage (1904). Bill Frisell's Trio presented the world premiere of the scores in January 2004 at two concerts taking place at the New York Guitar Festival. The performances were later broadcast on WNYC New York Public Radio.
- Georges Méliès is a key character in the book and concept album La Mécanique du Cœur of the French rock band Dionysos, released in 2007. He also appears in the animated adaptation released in October 2013.
- Brian Selznick's novel The Invention of Hugo Cabret features an extensive tribute to Méliès's contribution to cinema history, as well as a description of the "man in the Moon" scene. Martin Scorsese's film adaptation Hugo, with Ben Kingsley playing Méliès, prominently features this scene and includes other scenes from the movie.
- Montreal rock band God Inc. has paid tribute to Méliès with the song "The Cinemagician". The video for the song features a montage of interesting moments from several of Méliès' films.
- The 2016 mockumentary Fury of the Demon tells the history of Méliès, his work, and his cultural impact by way of a documentary about a fictional lost film purported to have been created by Méliès, capable of driving its viewers temporarily insane.

== A Trip to the Moon ==
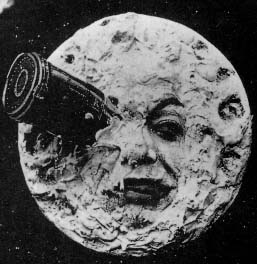
The space capsule hits the Moon, in the most famous scene from A Trip to the Moon

- Segundo de Chomón's film Excursion to the Moon, released in 1908 for Pathé Frères, is an unauthorized remake of A Trip to the Moon. The film follows Méliès's scenario closely and includes many of its features, with some variations: for example, the Selenites are not vulnerable to umbrellas, but rather appear and disappear at will; the capsule lands inside the Man in the Moon's open mouth rather than hitting its eye; and the Selenite who returns to Earth is a "dancing moon-maiden" who is betrothed at the end of the film to one of the astronomers. This film has occasionally been misidentified as a work by Méliès.
- Epcot's Horizons pavilion featured the scenes from the film, including the Moon, during the Jules Verne sequence near the beginning of the ride to highlight how past viewed the future.
- Space Mountain: De la terre à la lune featured a projection of a smiling moon, reminiscent of the moon from Méliès's film. The ride was based on the Jules Verne novel From the Earth to the Moon.
- The HBO miniseries From The Earth To The Moon featured a documentary-style recreation of the filming process during its last episode, titled "Le Voyage Dans La Lune" in honor of Méliès's work. Méliès was played by Tchéky Karyo.
- The music video for the song "Tonight, Tonight" by the rock band The Smashing Pumpkins is heavily inspired by A Trip to the Moon and replicates its most famous scenes.
- Le Voyage Dans La Lune is a 2012 album by French band Air, featuring vocals by Victoria Legrand and Au Revoir Simone. The album is based on and expanded from the score Air provided for the hand-tinted restoration of the film.
- The trophies given out by Visual Effects Society at their yearly awards ceremony feature the famous shot of the Moon with the rocket in its eye.
- In the second episode of Futurama, "The Series Has Landed", Luna Park mascot Crater Face resembles Méliès's "Man in the Moon". Bender embeds his beer bottle in Crater Face's eye after Crater Face attempts to confiscate his alcohol. In the series finale, "Meanwhile", Crater Face gets another beer bottle embedded in his eye.
- The Simpsons references A Trip to the Moon in the episode "Blame it on Lisa", through the Itchy & Scratchy segment "Par for the Corpse", in which Itchy decapitates Scratchy with a golf club, knocking his head into outer space, where it hits the eye of the Man in the Moon.
- The 1956 film version of Around the World in Eighty Days features an abridged version of A Trip to the Moon, introduced by Edward R. Murrow, as part of the film's prologue.
- An image of the Man in the Moon can be seen in Rob Zombie's The Lords of Salem.
- The image of the Man in the Moon serves as the cover art for The Wesleyan Anthology of Science Fiction, edited by Arthur B. Evans, Istvan Csicsery-Ronay Jr., Joan Gordon, Veronica Hollinger, Rob Latham, and Carol McGuirk.
- The production of Katy Perry's performance of her song "Wide Awake" at the 2012 Billboard Music Awards was based upon Méliès' A Trip To The Moon.
- On August 10, 2013, as part of the ongoing Return of Moon Maid saga, the Dick Tracy strip introduced Méliès whose head looks like the Man in the Moon seen in A Trip to the Moon.
- In October 2015, the music video for the song "Mess Around" by rock band Cage the Elephant is created using all footage from the film and other Georges Méliès' films.
- Korean group Seventeen mentions the movie in a verse of their 2019 song "Back it up".
- German metal festival M'era Luna used the image of the Man in the Moon as their official logo until 2019. More recently, a similar but altered version is used.
- In the animated series Disenchantment a carnival ride in the third season's Steamland can be seen, shaped after the image of the Man in the Moon.
- In the Cartoon Network sitcom The Amazing World of Gumball, the iconic scene of the moon is parodied in the episode “The Deal”, when one Nicole brags about her new status of Employee of the Month is by shooting fireworks that spell “Nicole Watterson: Employee of the Month”, but one of the fireworks the moon in the eye while it screams in agony, which also recreates the iconic scene.
- The ending title sequence for episodes 1-12 of the anime series Lycoris Recoil, pays homage to the film. When Takina Inoue is drawing a rocket in a foggy window during a rainy day, the camera shortly pans upward to show the drawing of the rocket "moving" before "crashing" into the same moon of the aforementioned film.
- Clips from the film are used for the music video for Red Sun Rising's 2018 promotional single "Fascination".
- A picture of Méliès flew on board Artemis 1 which orbited the Moon in 2022.
- Footage of the iconic moon scene is used in the 2024 film Lisa Frankenstein.
- The Moon was featured during the 2024 Summer Olympics opening ceremony.
