= Home entertainment =

Home entertainment refers to media, equipment, and methods used for delivery and enjoyment of various forms of entertainment in the home, and may refer to:

- Home audio
- Home cinema
- Home video
- Magnetic tape
- Phonograph record
- Streaming media
- Video game
- Television
- Film

== See also ==
- Home entertainment system (disambiguation)
