= List of French films before 1910 =

A list of the earliest films produced in the Cinema of France between 1892 and 1909 ordered by year of release. For an A-Z list of French films see Category:French films

== 1890s ==
Title	Director	Cast	Genre	Notes
1892
Le Clown et ses chiens	Émile Reynaud		Animation	One of the first animated films in the world
Pauvre Pierrot	Émile Reynaud		Animation	One of the first animated films in the world
Un bon bock	Émile Reynaud		Animation	The first film to be screened using Reynaud's optical theatre
1895
L'Arrivée d'un Train en Gare de la Ciotat	Lumière brothers			Pioneer film
L'Arroseur Arrosé	Louis Lumière			First film comedy
Autour d'une cabine	Émile Reynaud		Animation	
Barque sortant du port	Louis Lumière		Documentary	
Les Forgerons	Louis Lumière		Documentary	
La Mer	Louis Lumière		Documentary	
Neuville-sur-Saône: Débarquement du congrès des photographes à Lyon	Louis Lumière	P.J.C. Janssen (himself)	Documentary	
Partie de cartes	Louis Lumière	Antoine Féraud	Documentary	
La Pêche aux poissons rouges	Louis Lumière		Documentary	
Place des Cordeliers à Lyon	Louis Lumière		Documentary	
Repas de bébé	Louis Lumière		Documentary	
Le Saut à la couverture	Louis Lumière		Documentary	
La Voltige	Louis Lumière		Documentary	
Workers Leaving the Lumière Factory	Louis Lumière			
1896
Arrivée d'un train gare de Vincennes	Georges Méliès			
L'Arroseur	Georges Méliès			
Baignade en mer	Georges Méliès			
Bataille de boules de neige	Louis Lumière		Documentary	
Bateau-mouche sur la Seine	Georges Méliès			
Batteuse à vapeur	Georges Méliès			
Bébé et fillettes	Georges Méliès			
Le Bivouac	Georges Méliès			
Les Blanchisseuses	Georges Méliès			
Bois de Boulogne	Georges Méliès			
Boulevard des Italiens	Georges Méliès			
La Fée aux Choux	Alice Guy Blaché			Pioneer film
Le Manoir du diable	Georges Méliès	Jeanne d'Alcy; Georges Méliès	Horror	The first horror film ever made
1897
Danse Serpentine	Lumiere Brothers	Papinta		
1898
Un homme de têtes	Georges Méliès	Georges Méliès		IMDb
1899
Illusioniste fin de siècle	Georges Méliès			
Jeanne d'Arc	Georges Méliès	Jeanne d'Alcy; Georges Méliès		

== 1900s ==
Title	Director	Actors	Genre	Notes
1900
Cyrano de Bergerac	Clément Maurice	Benoit Constant Coquelin	Drama	
Duel d'Hamlet Le	Clément Maurice	Sarah Bernhardt		
L'homme orchestre	Georges Méliès			
Madame Sans-Gêne	Clément Maurice	Gabrielle Réjane	Comedy / Drama	
Le Repas fantastique	Georges Méliès			
The Two Blind Men	Georges Méliès	Georges Méliès		
1901
Barbe-bleue	Georges Méliès	Jeanne d'Alcy, Georges Méliès	Crime / Drama	IMDb
1902
The Man with the Rubber Head	Georges Méliès	Georges Méliès	Comedy / Fantasy	
Restitution inattendue	unknown		Comedy	
A Trip to the Moon	Georges Méliès		Fantasy / Sci-fi	
Le Voyage de Gulliver à Lilliput et chez les géants	Georges Méliès			
1903
L'Auberge du Bon Repos	Georges Méliès			English:The Inn Where no Man Rests
The Infernal Boiling Pot	Georges Méliès		Short, Fantasy, Horror	
1904
The Impossible Voyage	Georges Méliès		Fantasy	Pioneer in special effects
1905
Vie et Passion du Christ	Lucien Nonguet; Ferdinand Zecca			Hand painted color
1906
Aladin ou la lampe merveilleuse	Albert Capellani		Fantasy / Adventure	
1907
20,000 Lieues Sous les Mers	Georges Méliès			
L'Enfant prodigue	Michel Carré			First European feature film
Satan in Prison	Georges Méliès			

== See also ==
- 1892 in France
- 1895 in France
- 1896 in France
- 1898 in France
- 1899 in France
- 1900 in France
- 1901 in France
- 1902 in France
- 1903 in France
- 1904 in France
- 1905 in France
- 1906 in France
- 1907 in France
