= Salon Indien du Grand Café =

Café in Paris, France, place of the first commercial movie projection

Coordinates: 48°52′13″N 2°19′46″E

Cinématographe Lumière poster featuring an image of Le Jardinier (l'Arroseur Arrosé) ("The Gardener", or "The Sprinkler Sprinkled")

Le Salon Indien du Grand Café was a room in the basement of the Grand Café, on the Boulevard des Capucines near the Place de l'Opéra in the center of Paris.

== Films ==
The salon is notable for being the place that hosted the first commercial public film screening by the Lumière brothers, on December 28, 1895. The ten short films on the program (in order of presentation), were:

1. La Sortie de l'Usine Lumière à Lyon (literally, "the exit from the Lumière factory in Lyon", or, under its more common English title, Workers Leaving the Lumiere Factory), 46 seconds
2. La Voltige ("Horse Trick Riders"), 46 seconds
3. La Pêche aux poissons rouges ("fishing for goldfish"), 42 seconds
4. Le Débarquement du Congrès de Photographie à Lyon ("the disembarkment of the Congress of Photographers in Lyon"), 48 seconds
5. Les Forgerons ("Blacksmiths"), 49 seconds
6. Le Jardinier (l'Arroseur Arrosé) ("The Gardener", or "The Sprinkler Sprinkled"), 49 seconds
7. Repas de bébé ("Baby's Breakfast" (lit. "baby's meal")), 41 seconds
8. Le Saut à la couverture ("Jumping Onto the Blanket"), 41 seconds
9. La Places des Cordeliers à Lyon ("Cordeliers Square in Lyon"—a street scene), 44 seconds
10. La Mer (Baignade en mer) ("the sea [bathing in the sea]"), 38 seconds

The cinematograph was hand-cranked for the recording and the exhibition of the films.

The Lumières previously screened films at the Société d'encouragement pour l'industrie nationale on 22 March 1895, and at the Congrès de photographes in Lyon on 11 June 1895.

Earlier commercial public screenings of films were held by Woodville Latham, his sons and Eugene Augustin Lauste with their Eidoloscope on 20 May 1895, and by Max Skladanowsky and his brother Emil with the Bioscop in Berlin from 1 to 31 November 1895, and in Hamburg from 21 December 1895. Émile Reynaud's presentations of his hand-painted bands of Pantomimes Lumineuses for his Théâtre Optique from 1892 to 1900 at the Musée Grévin in Paris can also be regarded as earlier commercial public film screenings. Before that, Ottomar Anschütz had already presented his chronophotographic recordings as moving pictures to thousands of paying customers with his Electrotachyscope, on a small opal glass screen since 1887, and on a large screen from November 1894 to March 1895.

Currently, the building standing at No. 14 Boulevard des Capucines is the Hotel Scribe, which opened a restaurant called Café Lumière, in memory of its history. The Grand Cafe Capucines located at No. 4 is a successor to the original, further along the boulevard.
