= 1895 in film =

The following is an overview of the events of 1895 in film, including a list of films released and notable births.

== Events ==
- February–March – Robert W. Paul and Birt Acres build and run the first working 35 mm movie camera in Britain, the Kineopticon. Their first films include Incident at Clovelly Cottage (March), The Oxford and Cambridge University Boat Race (March 30) and Rough Sea at Dover.
- February 13 – In France, the brothers Auguste and Louis Lumière patent the Cinematographe, a combination lightweight, hand-held movie camera and projector. The several short films they create at this time are considered to be pivotal in the history of film.
- March 22 – Auguste and Louis Lumière make what is probably the first presentation of a projected celluloid film moving picture, the 46-second Workers Leaving the Lumière Factory, to members of the Société d'encouragement pour l'industrie nationale in Paris.
- May 27 – Birt Acres patents the Kineopticon under his own name.
- Late September – C. Francis Jenkins and Thomas Armat demonstrate their Phantoscope, a motion picture projector, in Atlanta, Georgia, at the Cotton States and International Exposition.
- November 1 – In Germany, Max Skladanowsky and his brother Emil present a short film at the Berlin Wintergarten theatre using the movie projector they have developed.
- December 28 – Auguste and Louis Lumière make what is probably the first commercial public screening of projected moving picture films to a paying audience, at the Salon Indien du Grand Café in the Boulevard des Capucines in Paris. This date is sometimes considered the debut of the motion picture as an entertainment medium.
- December 30 – The American Mutoscope and Biograph Company motion pictures is founded in New Jersey by the KMCD Syndicate of William Kennedy Dickson, Henry Marvin, Herman Casler and Elias Koopman. Casler has manufactured the Biograph 68 mm camera, which becomes the first successful large format 68mm (70mm) film.
- Annabelle the Dancer is a sensation in shorts such as Annabelle Serpentine Dance.
- William Kennedy Dickson and his sister Antonia publish History of the Kinetograph, Kinetoscope, and Kinetophonograph in the United States with a preface by Thomas Edison, the first history of the subject.
- Gaumont founded by the engineer-turned-inventor, Léon Gaumont. Woodville Latham and his sons develop the Latham Loop – the concept of loose loops of film on either side of the intermittent movement to prevent stress from the jerky movement. This is debuted in the Eidoloscope, which is also the first widescreen format (1.85:1).
- Henri Joly debuts his Joly-Normandin 60 mm format.

== Films released in 1895 ==
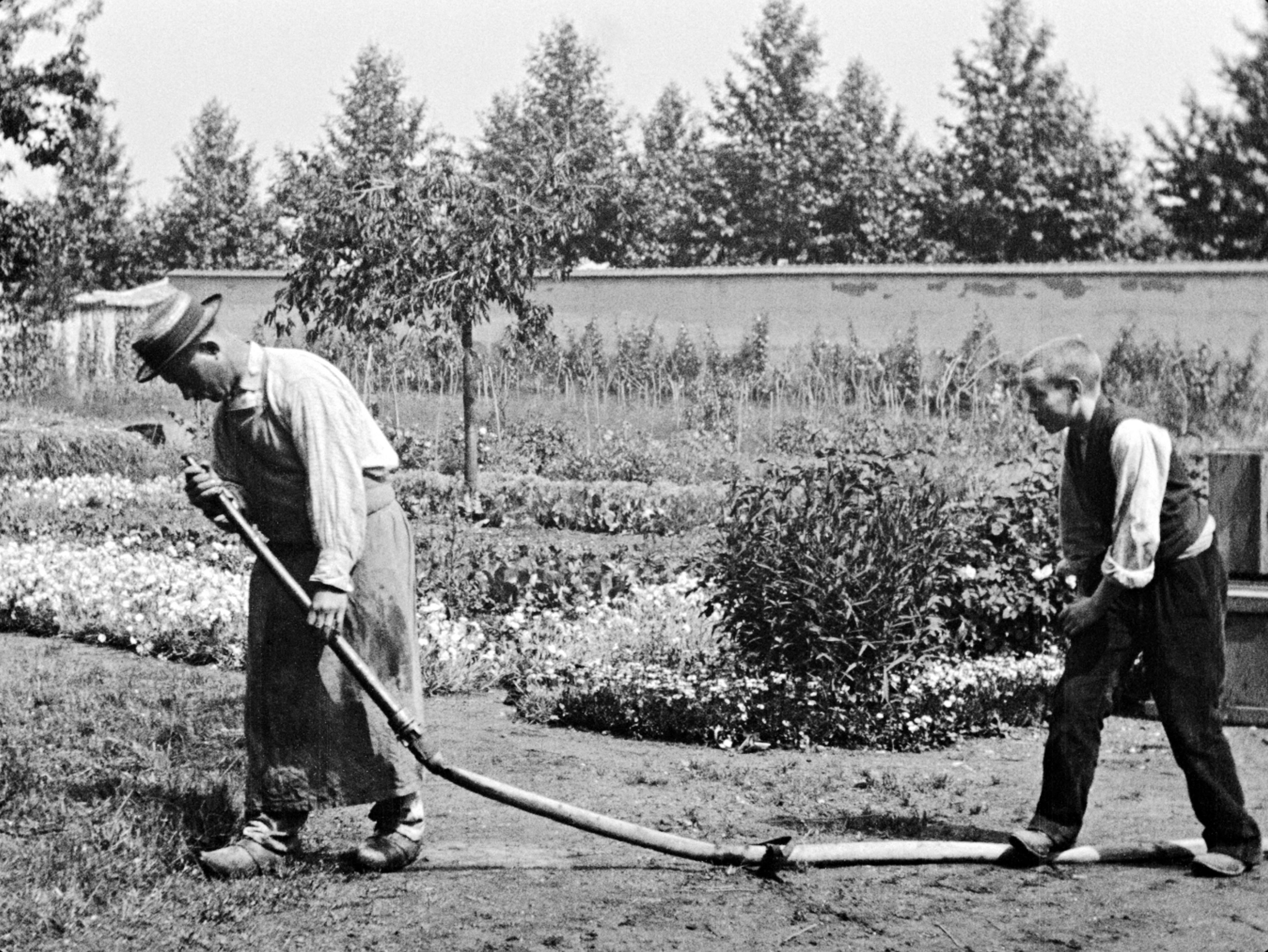
L'Arroseur Arrosé (1895) the earliest known instance of film comedy, as well as the first use of film to portray a fictional story.

- Akrobatisches Potpourri
- Annabelle Serpentine Dance, directed by William Heise, starring Annabelle Moore
- The Baby's Meal, directed by Louis Lumiere, starring Auguste Lumiere, (his wife) Marguerite, and (their daughter) Andrée
- Bauerntanz zweier Kinder
- Billy Edwards and the Unknown a.k.a. Billy Edwards Boxing
- The Blacksmiths, directed by Louis Lumiere
- Boat Leaving The Port, directed by Louis Lumiere
- Boxing Kangaroo
- Card Party, directed by Louis Lumiere
- La Charcuterie mécanique
- Demolition Of A Wall, directed by Louis Lumiere and starring Auguste Lumiere, the man in charge...pointing
- The Derby, directed by Birt Acres
- The Dickson Experimental Sound Film, directed by and starring William K. L. Dickson on violin. First sound film.
- The Execution of Mary Stuart, directed by Alfred Clark. First special effect (stop camera edit effect) in cinema.
- Incident at Clovelly Cottage, shot by Birt Acres
- Fishing For Goldfish, directed by Louis Lumiere, starring Auguste Lumiere and (his daughter) Andrée
- Opening of the Kiel Canal
- The Oxford and Cambridge University Boat Race
- Cordeliers' Square in Lyons, directed by Louis Lumiere
- Photograph, directed by Louis Lumiere
- The Photographical Congress Arrives in Lyon, directed by Louis Lumiere
- Princess Ali a.k.a. Egyptian Dance, directed by William Heise
- Rough Sea at Dover, directed by Birt Acres
- Le Saut à la couverture
- Serpentinen Tanz
- L'Arroseur Arrosé, directed by Louis Lumiere. May be the first outdoor comedy film ever made.
- Swimming In The Sea, directed by Louis Lumiere
- Transformation By Hats, Comic View, directed by Louis Lumiere
- Trilby Hypnotic Scene, directed by William Heise, produced by Thomas Edison
- Trilby Death Scene, directed by William Heise, produced by Thomas Edison
- La Voltige
- Das Wintergartenprogramm, directed by Max Skladanowsky
- Workers Leaving the Lumière Factory, directed by Louis Lumiere

== Births ==
| Month | Date | Name | Country | Profession | Died |
| January | 5 | A. Edward Sutherland | US | Director, Actor | 1973 |
| January | 23 | Raymond Griffith | US | Actor | 1957 |
| February | 7 | Anita Stewart | US | Actress, Producer | 1961 |
| February | 19 | Louis Calhern | US | Actor | 1956 |
| February | 21 | Charles King | US | Actor | 1957 |
| February | 25 | Einar Axelsson | Sweden | Actor | 1971 |
| March | 11 | Shemp Howard | US | Actor | 1955 |
| March | 24 | Syd Saylor | US | Actor | 1962 |
| March | 25 | Valéry Inkijinoff | Russia | Actor | 1973 |
| March | 27 | Betty Schade | Germany | Actress | 1982 |
| April | 7 | Margarete Schön | Germany | Actress | 1985 |
| May | 6 | Rudolph Valentino | Italy | Actor | 1926 |
| June | 24 | Jack Dempsey | US | Boxer, Actor | 1983 |
| July | 9 | Cullen Landis | US | Actor, Director | 1975 |
| July | 13 | Sidney Blackmer | US | Actor | 1973 |
| July | 21 | Henry Lynn | US | Director, Screenwriter | 1984 |
| July | 25 | Ingeborg Spangsfeldt | Denmark | Actress | 1968 |
| July | 26 | Gracie Allen | UK | Actress | 1964 |
| August | 9 | Nat Pendleton | US | Olympic Wrestler, Actor | 1967 |
| August | 16 | Lucien Littlefield | US | Actor | 1960 |
| September | 11 | Uno Henning | Sweden | Actor | 1970 |
| September | 22 | Paul Muni | Austria | Actor | 1967 |
| October | 4 | Buster Keaton | US | Actor, Director | 1966 |
| October | 20 | Evelyn Brent | US | Actress | 1975 |
| October | 21 | Edna Purviance | US | Actress | 1958 |
| November | 14 | Louise Huff | US | Actress | 1973 |
| December | 3 | Tadeusz Olsza | Poland | Actor | 1975 |
