= Lumière brothers =

French brothers, filmmakers and inventors

Auguste and Louis Lumière
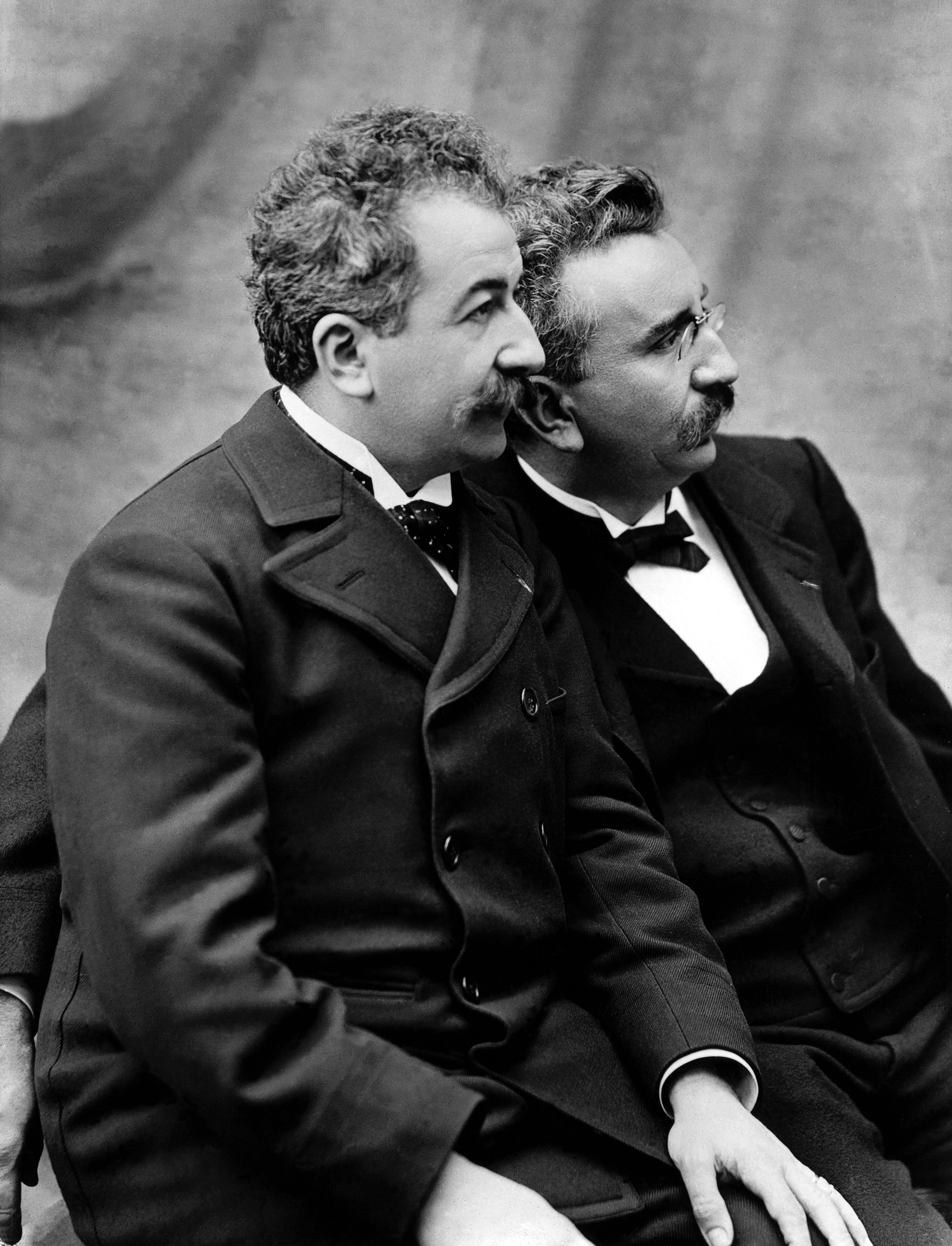
- Auguste (left) and Louis Lumière, c. 1895
- Resting place: New Guillotière Cemetery
- Education: La Martiniere Lyon
- Occupations: Filmmakers; inventors
- Awards: Elliott Cresson Medal (1909)

Auguste Lumière
- Born: Auguste Marie Louis Nicolas Lumière; 19 October 1862; Besançon, France
- Died: 10 April 1954 (aged 91); Lyon, France

Louis Lumière
- Born: Louis Francis Patrick Jean Lumière; 5 October 1864; Besançon, France
- Died: 6 June 1948 (aged 83); Bandol, France

The Lumière brothers (UK: /ˈluːmiɛər/, US: /ˌluːmiˈɛər/; French: [lymjɛːʁ]), Auguste Marie Louis Nicolas Lumière (19 October 1862 – 10 April 1954) and Louis Jean Lumière (5 October 1864 – 6 June 1948), were French manufacturers of photography equipment, best known for their Cinématographe motion picture system and the short films they produced between 1895 and 1905, which places them among the earliest filmmakers.

Their screening of a single film on 22 March 1895, for around 200 members of the Société d'encouragement pour l'industrie nationale (Society for the Development of the National Industry) in Paris was probably the first presentation of projected film. Their first commercial public screening on 28 December 1895, for around 40 paying visitors and invited relations, has traditionally been regarded as the birth of cinema.

== History ==
The Lumière brothers were born in Besançon, France, to Charles-Antoine Lumière (1840–1911) and Jeanne Joséphine Costille Lumière, who were married in 1861 and moved to Besançon, setting up a small photographic portrait studio. Here were born Auguste, Louis and their daughter Jeanne. They moved to Lyon in 1870, where their two other daughters were born: Mélina and Francine. Auguste and Louis both attended La Martiniere, the largest technical school in Lyon.

They patented several significant processes leading up to their film camera, most notably film perforations (originally implemented by Émile Reynaud) as a means of advancing the film through the camera and projector. The original cinématographe had been patented by Léon Guillaume Bouly on 12 February 1892. The cinématographe—a three-in-one device that could record, copy, and project motion pictures—was further developed by the Lumières. The brothers patented their own version on 13 February 1895.

The date of the recording of their first film is in dispute. In an interview with Georges Sadoul given in 1948, Louis claimed that he shot the film in August 1894—before the arrival of the kinetoscope in France. This is questioned by historians, who consider that a functional Lumière camera did not exist before the beginning of 1895.

The Lumière brothers saw film as a novelty and had withdrawn from the film business by 1905. They went on to develop the first practical photographic colour process, the Lumière Autochrome.

During World War II, the brothers collaborated with the Nazi-backed Vichy Regime; they received the Order of the Francisque and were made members of the National Council in 1941.

Louis died on 6 June 1948, and Auguste on 10 April 1954. They are buried in a family tomb in the New Guillotière Cemetery in Lyon.

== First film screenings ==
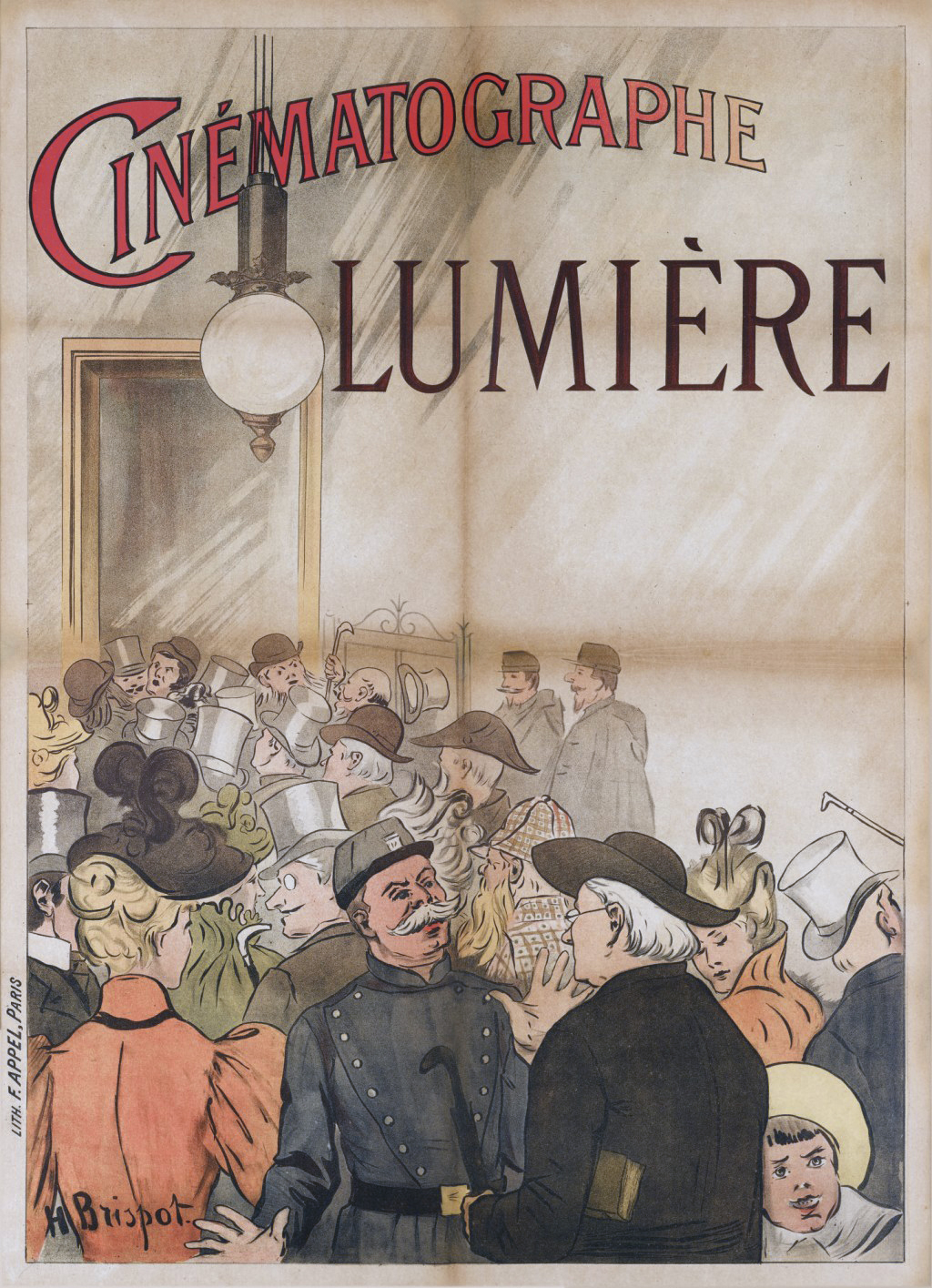
Early advertising poster for Cinématographe screenings, by Henri Brispot, 1896

On 22 March 1895, in Paris, at the Society for the Development of the National Industry, in front of a small audience, one of whom was said to be Léon Gaumont, then director of the company Comptoir Géneral de la Photographie, the Lumières privately screened a single film, Workers Leaving the Lumière Factory. The main focus of the conference by Louis concerned the recent developments in the photographic industry, mainly the research on polychromy (colour photography). It was much to Lumière's surprise that the moving black-and-white images retained more attention than the coloured stills.

The Lumières gave their first paid public screening on 28 December 1895, at Salon Indien du Grand Café in Paris. This presentation consisted of the following 10 short films:

1. La Sortie de l'usine Lumière à Lyon (literally, "the exit from the Lumière factory in Lyon", or, under its more common English title, Workers Leaving the Lumière Factory), 46 seconds
2. La Voltige (Horse Trick Riders), 46 seconds
3. La Pêche aux poissons rouges ("fishing for goldfish"), 42 seconds
4. Le Débarquement du congrès de photographie à Lyon (The Photographical Congress Arrives in Lyon), 48 seconds
5. Les Forgerons (The Blacksmiths), 49 seconds
6. Le Jardinier (L'Arroseur Arrosé) (The Gardener, or The Sprinkler Sprinkled), 49 seconds
7. Repas de bébé (Baby's Breakfast (lit. "baby's meal")), 41 seconds
8. Le Saut à la couverture ("Jumping Onto the Blanket"), 41 seconds
9. Place des Cordeliers à Lyon (Cordeliers' Square in Lyon), 44 seconds
10. La Mer (The Sea), 38 seconds

Each film was up to 17 m (56 ft) long, which, when hand cranked through a projector, runs approximately 50 seconds.

The Lumières went on tour with the cinématographe in 1896, visiting places like Mexico City, Brussels, Bombay, London, Montreal, New York City, Palestine, and Buenos Aires.

In 1896, only a few months after the initial screenings in Europe, films by the Lumiere Brothers were shown in Egypt, first in the Tousson stock exchange in Alexandria on 5 November 1896, and then in the Hamam Schneider (Schneider Bath) in Cairo.

== Early colour photography ==
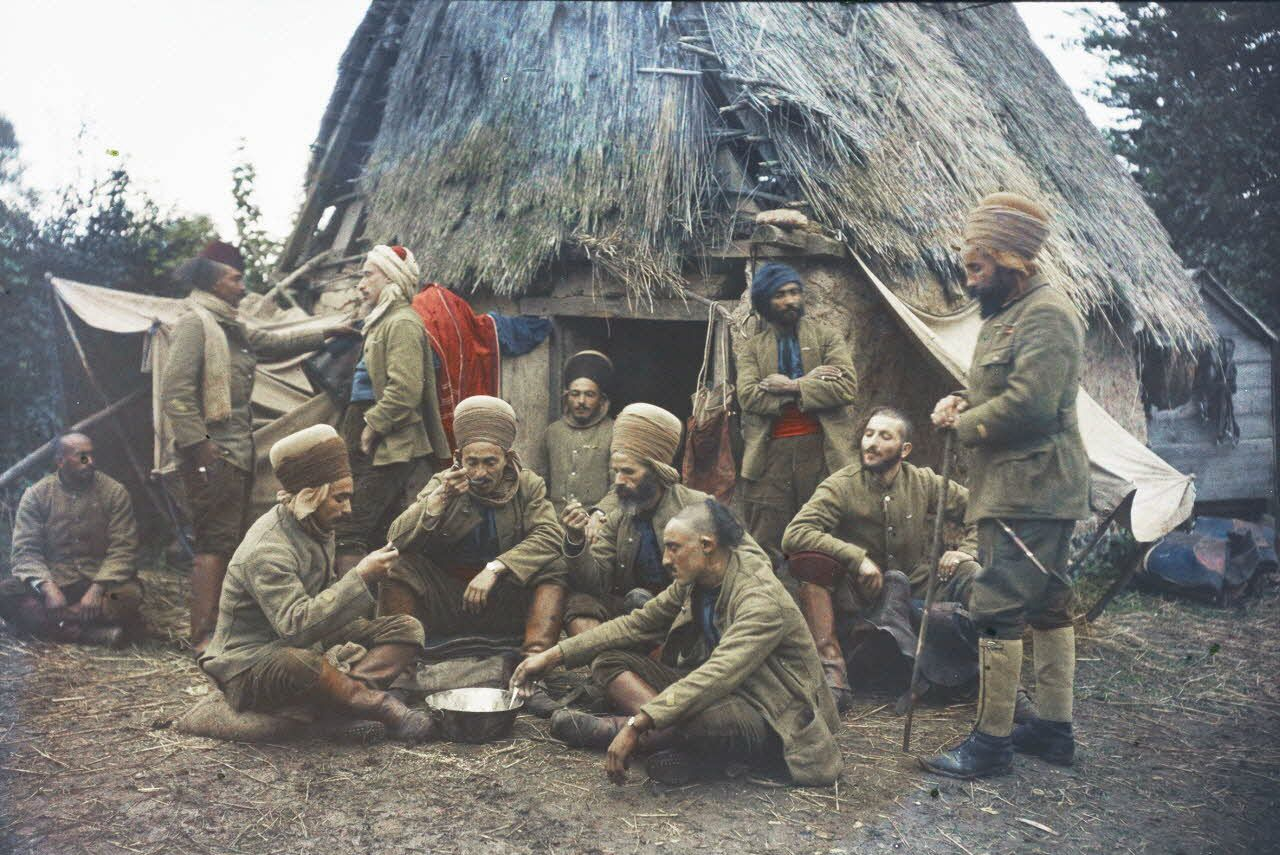
Autochrome colour picture by Jean-Baptiste Tournassoud of North-African soldiers, Pas-de-Calais, France, 1915

The brothers stated that "the cinema is an invention without any future" and declined to sell their camera to other filmmakers such as Georges Méliès. This made many film makers upset. Consequently, their role in the history of film was exceedingly brief. In parallel with their cinema work they experimented with colour photography. They worked on colour photographic processes in the 1890s including the Lippmann process (interference heliochromy) and their own 'bichromated glue' process, a subtractive colour process, examples of which were exhibited at the Exposition Universelle in Paris in 1900. This last process was commercialised by the Lumieres but commercial success had to wait for their next colour process. In 1903 they patented a colour photographic process, the Autochrome Lumière, which was launched on the market in 1907. Throughout much of the 20th century, the Lumière company was a major producer of photographic products in Europe, but the brand name, Lumière, disappeared from the marketplace following merger with Ilford.

== Film systems that preceded the Cinématographe Lumière ==
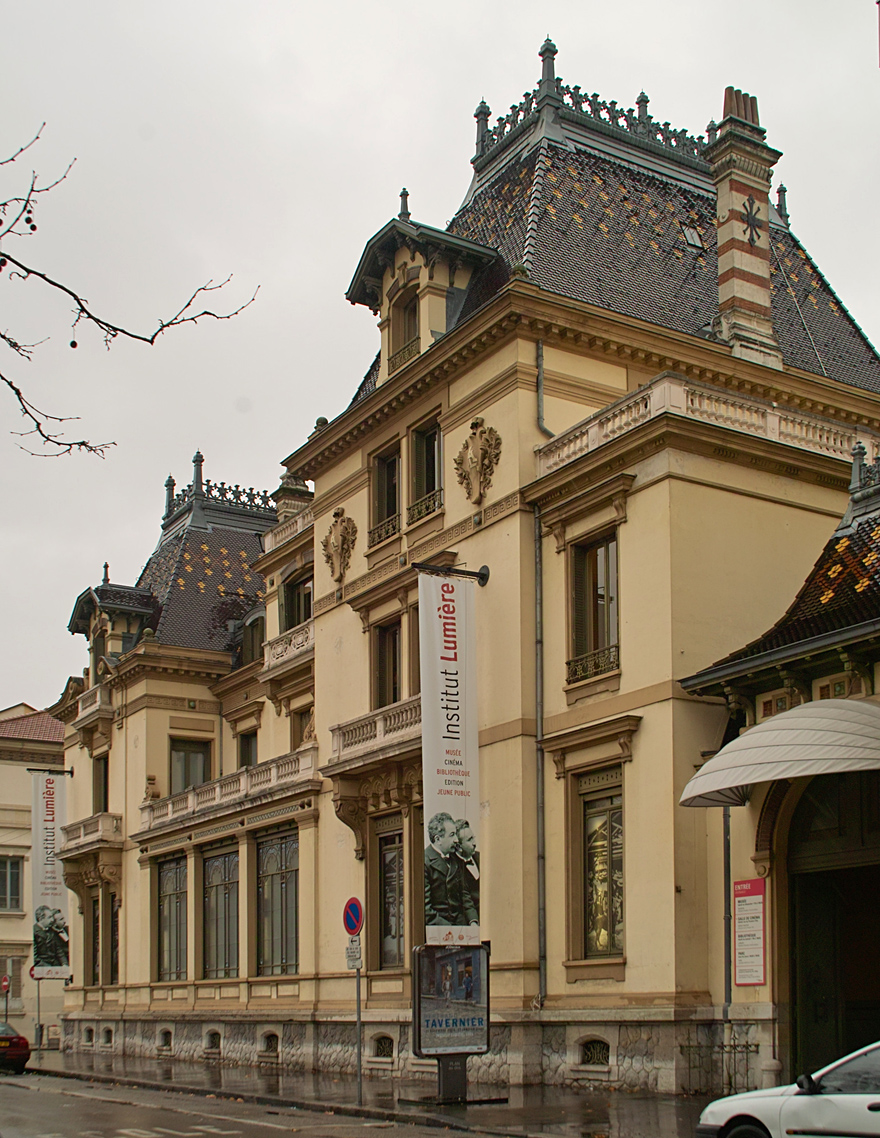
Their father's house in Lyon houses the Institut Lumière museum.

Earlier moving images, for instance those of the phantasmagoria shows, the phénakisticope, the zoetrope and Émile Reynaud's Théâtre Optique consisted of hand-drawn images. A system that could record photographic reality in motion, in a fashion much like it is seen by the eyes, had a greater impact on people.

Eadweard Muybridge's Zoopraxiscope projected moving painted silhouettes based on his chronophotographic work. The only Zoopraxiscope disc with actual photographs was made as an early form of stop motion.

Less-known predecessors, such as Jules Duboscq's Bioscope, patented in 1852, were not developed to project moving images.

A Polish inventor, Kazimierz Prószyński, built his camera and projecting device, called Pleograph, in 1894, before those made by the Lumière brothers.

Le Prince went missing in 1890, before he could give public demonstrations of the patented cameras and projectors he had been developing during the previous years. His short film known as Roundhay Garden Scene (1888) is regarded as the oldest surviving film.

William Friese-Greene patented a "machine camera" in 1889, which embodied many aspects of later film cameras. He displayed the results at photographic societies in 1890 and developed further cameras, but did not publicly project the results.

Ottomar Anschütz's Electrotachyscope projected very short loops of high photographic quality.

Thomas Edison believed projection of films was not as viable a business model as offering the films in the "peepshow" kinetoscope device. Watching the images on the screen turned out to be much preferred by audiences. Thomas Edison's Kinetoscope, developed by William Kennedy Dickson, premiered publicly in 1894.

Lauste and Latham's Eidoloscope was demonstrated for members of the press on 21 April 1895, and it opened to the paying public on Broadway on 20 May. They shot films up to twenty minutes long at speeds of over thirty frames per second and showed them in many US cities. The Eidoloscope Company was dissolved in 1896 after various internal disputes.

Max and Emil Skladanowsky, inventors of the Bioscop, offered projected moving images to a paying public in Berlin from 1 November 1895 until the end of that month. Their machinery was relatively cumbersome and their films much shorter than those of the Lumière brothers. The Skladanowskys' screenings booked in Paris were cancelled after the news of the Lumière show. Nonetheless, they toured their films to other countries.

== Filmography ==
This page lists the films produced by the Lumière company that were recorded in France between 1895 and 1905. During this period, the Lumière brothers and their camera operators created more than a thousand short actuality films documenting everyday life, industrial work, public events, and staged scenes. A substantial portion of this output was filmed in France, particularly in Lyon, Paris, and various regional locations. The list follows the traditional Lumière catalogue numbering system used in major filmographic references.

=== Film ===
Year	Title	Director	Notes
1895	La Sortie de l'usine Lumière à Lyon	Louis Lumière	Lumière Catalogue no. 1
1895	La Voltige	Louis Lumière	Lumière Catalogue no. 2
1895	La Pêche aux poissons rouges	Louis Lumière	Lumière Catalogue no. 3
1895	The Photographical Congress Arrives in Lyon	Louis Lumière	Lumière Catalogue no. 4
1895	Les Forgerons	Louis Lumière	Lumière Catalogue no. 6
1895	L'Arroseur Arrosé	Louis Lumière	Considered the first film comedy
1895	Repas de bébé	Louis Lumière	Lumière Catalogue no. 88
1895	Le Saut à la couverture	Louis Lumière	
1895	Place des Cordeliers à Lyon	Louis Lumière	
1895	La Mer (Baignade en mer)	Louis Lumière	
1895	L'Arrivée d'un train en gare de La Ciotat	Louis Lumière	One of the most famous early films
1895	Barque sortant du port	Louis Lumière	
1895	La Charcuterie mécanique	Louis Lumière	
1895	Bataille de neige	Louis Lumière	
1895	Partie de cartes	Louis Lumière	
1896	Démolition d'un mur	Louis Lumière	Famous for reverse‑projection trick
1896	Carmaux, défournage du coke	Louis Lumière	
1896	Naples	Louis Lumière	Travelogue
1896	Procession at Seville and bullfighting scenes	Louis Lumière	Travelogue
1896	Écriture à l'envers	Louis Lumière	

== See also ==
- 1895 in film
- 1896 in film
- 19th century in film
- Place Ambroise-Courtois
- Birt Acres
