= Andrée Lumière =

French actress

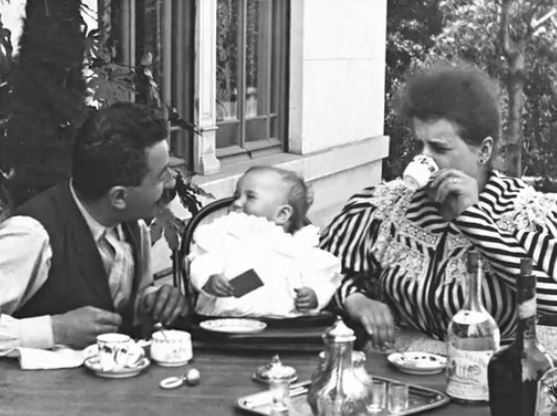
- Andrée Lumière (center) with her parents in Repas de bébé (1895)
- Born: 22 June 1894; Lyon, France
- Died: 26 November 1918 (aged 24); Lyon, France
- Occupation: Actress
- Years active: 1895–1897
- Parents: Auguste Lumière (father); Marguerite Lumière (mother)

Andrée Lumière (22 June 1894 – 26 November 1918) was a French actress, best known for appearing in Repas de bébé (1895).

== Early life and career ==
Andrée Lumière was born on 22 June 1894 in Lyon, France, as the only daughter of Auguste Lumière and Marguerite Lumière. In 1895, at the age of 1, Andrée appeared in the silent short film Repas de bébé. She is possibly the actress in the 1896 silent short film Childish Quarrel.

== Death ==
On 26 November 1918 in Lyon, France, Andrée Lumière died due to the Spanish influenza at the age of 24.

== Filmography ==
- Repas de bébé, as herself.
- La Pêche aux poissons rouges, as herself.
- Retour d'une promenade en mer, as herself.
- Enfants aux jouets, as herself.
- Ronde enfantine, as herself.

== In media ==
Andrée Lumière is seen in the 2016 documentary Lumière!.
