= Procession at Seville and bullfighting scenes =

1898 silent short film

Procession at Seville and bullfighting scenes

Procession at Seville and bullfighting Scenes is a non-fiction short film created by Auguste and Louis Lumière between 1898 and 1899. The Lumière brothers used a cinematograph to film this motion picture in Seville, Spain.

== Plot ==
Procession at Seville and bullfighting scenes depicts the traditional Spanish Holy Week celebration, portraying Spain in the 19th century. This recording includes a traditional parade and bullfights in Spain, representing how this holiday was celebrated at the time. At the beginning, the short film shows the Procession Parade from the Christ of Sorrows. This celebration occurs during Holy Week in Seville which is celebrated one week before Easter. It includes decorated chariots that are pulled around the city streets by Costaleros. The Penitentes, dressed in tunics and a cape, march together in the procession along with the chariots and other people wearing traditional and formal clothing During the bullfighting celebration, the Banderillero entertains the bull and plays with it, meanwhile a Picador (Lancer) enters the spectacle. The Picador is riding a horse and manages to stab the bull. The short film displays the process of bullfighting and how each participant plays their specific role, as well as the traditional parade.

== Production and development ==
=== Production ===
To create the short film, the Lumière Brothers used a cinematograph, a new projection device which was beginning to be used at that time. The brothers sent different equipment all over the world in order to film a variety of scenes and images. Two of the main filming locations were France and Spain. This short non-fiction film marked the first time that someone filmed the Spanish Holy Week.

== Distribution and reception ==
The first 1,000 copies of this film were distributed by Auguste and Louis Lumière. Procession at Seville and bullfighting scenes was found later on a 16mm reel and a videocassette, along with other 46 Lumière films. After this, the Library of Congress as well as the World Digital Library, the latter created by the UNESCO in order to distribute cultural and academic content, distributed the video in a digital format via the Internet.
