= Démolition d'un mur =

1896 film by Louis Lumière

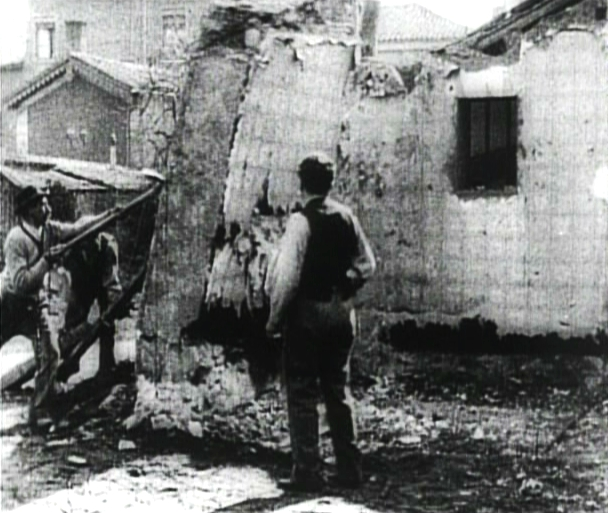
- Directed by: Louis Lumière
- Produced by: Louis Lumière
- Starring: Auguste Lumière
- Cinematography: Louis Lumière
- Release date: 1895
- Country: France
- Language: Silent

Démolition d'un mur (Demolition of a wall) is an 1895 French short black-and-white silent film directed and produced by Louis Lumière. His brother Auguste Lumière appears, along with two other men.

== Synopsis ==
Démolition d'un mur (1896)

Another single-shot Lumière Brothers film, it shows the demolition of a wall on the grounds of the factory.

== Production ==
It was filmed by means of the Cinématographe, an all-in-one camera, which also served as a film projector and developer. As with all early Lumière movies, this film was made in a 35 mm format with an aspect ratio of 1.33:1.

== Release and legacy ==
The Lumières were known to project Démolition d'un mur in both forward and reverse motion. An urban legend attributed this to an inadvertent discovery in which the film strip was rewound in the projector while the light was still on.

Bill Brand's 1973 structural film Demolition of a Wall is organized around six frames of the wall collapsing in the Lumières' film. It associates each of the frames with a musical note played on a piano and presents every permutation of the six frames, starting in chronological order and ending in reverse chronological order.

== Current status ==
Given its age, this short film is no longer subject to copyright protection and is available to freely download from the Internet.
