= Partie de cartes =

1895 film by Louis Lumière

- The poster advertising the Lumière brothers cinematographe
- Directed by: Louis Lumière
- Produced by: Louis Lumière
- Starring: Antoine Féraud
- Cinematography: Louis Lumière
- Release dates: 1895; July 1896 (Finland)
- Running time: 43 seconds
- Country: France
- Language: Silent

Partie de cartes (also known as Card Game and The Messers. Lumière at Cards (USA), or A Quiet Game of Écarté) is an 1895 French black-and-white, silent short film directed and produced by Louis Lumière and starring Antoine Féraud.

== Plot ==
Partie d'écarté (1896)

Three older men, wearing hats and smoking cigars, are sitting at a patio. Two of the men are playing cards (Écarté) at a table while the third man sits watching. As the game continues a (younger) waiter walks across carrying a tray with a bottle of wine and glasses on it. The man sitting at the table then proceeds to pour the drinks while the waiter observes the card game.

== Production ==
It was filmed by means of the Cinématographe, an all-in-one camera, which also serves as a film projector and developer. As with all early Lumière films, this film was made in a 35 mm format with an aspect ratio of 1.33:1.

The production was shot at Villa du Clos des Plages in La Ciotat, France.

== Cast ==
- Antoine Féraud (waiter?)
- Antoine Lumière as Man playing cards (uncredited)
- Félicien Trewey as Man playing cards to the right (uncredited)
- Alphonse Winckler as Man playing cards (uncredited)

== Current status ==
Given its age, this short film is available to freely download from the Internet. It has also featured in a number of film collections including Landmarks of Early Film volume 1 and The Movies Begin – A Treasury of Early Cinema, 1894–1913.

== See also ==
- Playing Cards, a film and possible remake made the same year
