= Synema =

Synema may refer to:

- Synema, a botanical genus name that is considered synonymous to Mercurialis
- Synema (spider), a genus in Thomisidae

== See also ==
- Sinema (disambiguation)
