= Voltige =

Voltige may refer to:

- La Voltige, a French short black-and-white silent documentary film
- Equestrian vaulting, or acrobatics on horseback
