= Cinematic =

Cinematic describes anything related to cinema. It may refer to: any movie updates, cinema nights, cinematic review

== Film-related ==
- Cinematic cutscene, a sequence in a video game that is not interactive
- Cinematic music, original music written specifically to accompany a film
- Cinematic storytelling, a story told primarily through the use of visual media
- Cinematic techniques, a list of methods and techniques used in filmmaking

== Music ==
- The Cinematics, a Scottish alternative-rock band
- Cinematic (EP), a 2008 EP by Tony Harnell
- Cinematic, a 1995 album by Adrian Borland
- Cinematic (Illy album), released in 2013
- Cinematic (Owl City album), released in 2018
- Cinematics (album), a 2012 album by Set It Off

== See also ==
- Cinema (disambiguation)
- Kinematics, a subfield of physics that describes motion
