= Barque sortant du port =

1895 film by Louis Lumière

- Directed by: Louis Lumière
- Produced by: Louis Lumière
- Cinematography: Louis Lumière
- Release date: 1895
- Running time: 46 seconds
- Country: France
- Language: Silent

Barque sortant du port (also known as Boat Leaving the Port) is an 1895 French short black-and-white silent film directed and produced by Louis Lumière.

The film consists of a single shot of a boat leaving the port, being rowed into rough seas by three men. This scene is observed by two women and children who are standing on a nearby jetty.

== Production ==
It was filmed by means of the Cinématographe, an all-in-one camera, which also serves as a film projector and developer. As with all early Lumière movies, this film was made in a 35 mm format with an aspect ratio of 1.33:1.

== Current status ==
Barque sortant du port (1895)

Given its age, this short film is available to freely download from the Internet. It has also featured in a number of film collections including The Movies Begin – A Treasury of Early Cinema, 1894–1913 .
