= Léon Bouly =

French engineer and inventor of the cinematograph

Léon Guillaume Bouly (French: [buli]; 1872–1932) was a French inventor who created the word cinematograph.

== Cinematograph ==
After devising chronophotography devices, Bouly applied a patent on a reversible device of photography and optics for the analysis and synthesis of motions, calling it the Cynématographe Léon Bouly on February 12, 1892. On December 27, 1893, he shortened the name of his device to cinématographe.

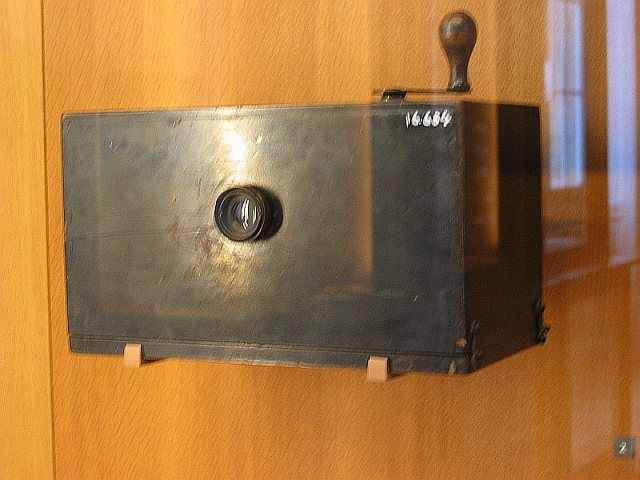
Bouly device at CNAM

This device is able to both shoot and project film. It uses a sensitive film without perforations and all principles required by cinematography are available: most notably, the film's jerky movement through the camera's gate is synchronized with the shutter. Two of these devices are conserved in the French Conservatoire National des Arts et Métiers.

In 1894, Bouly could not pay the fees for his patents and the name "cinématographe" became available again. He sold his rights to the device and its name to the Lumière Brothers, who applied it to their own device in 1895.
