= Watering the Flowers =

1896 film by Georges Méliès

L'Arroseur
- Directed by: Georges Méliès
- Produced by: Georges Méliès
- Release date: 1896
- Running time: 20 meters/65 feet
- Country: France
- Language: Silent

Watering the Flowers (French: L'Arroseur) was an 1896 French silent short comedy film directed by Georges Méliès. It was released by Méliès's company Star Film and is numbered 6 in its catalogues. The film was made in imitation of the more famous Louis Lumière film L'Arroseur Arrosé. It is currently presumed lost.

== See also ==
- List of lost films
