= Electrotachyscope =

Early motion-picture system invented in 1886

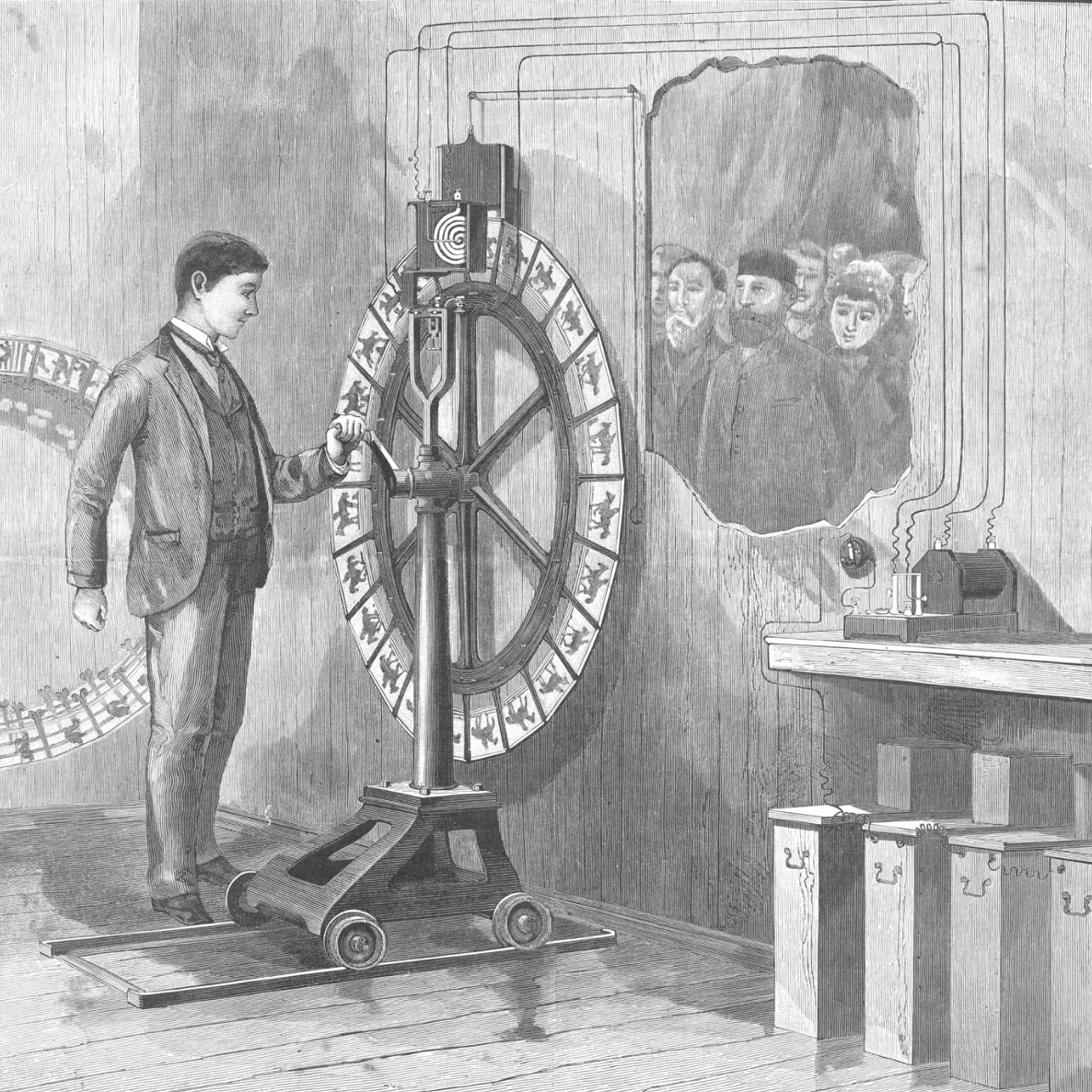
An electrotachyscope, Scientific American, 16 November 1889, p. 303

The Elektrische Schnellseher (from German: 'Electrical Quick-Viewer') or Electrotachyscope is an early motion picture system developed by chronophotographer Ottomar Anschütz between 1886 and 1894. He made at least seven different versions of the machine, including a projector, a peep-box viewer and several versions with illuminated glass photographs on a rotating wheel viewed on a 12.5 cm (4.9 in) wide milk glass screen by up to seven people at the same time. The system apparently influenced the development of the Kinetoscope film viewer by Edison's company (publicly introduced in 1894), and most of the subjects of the first Kinetoscope presentations resembled those of the Electrotachyscope.

== History ==
Before working on chronophotography and motion pictures, Anschütz had already received much acclaim for his instantaneous pictures of flying storks in 1884.

In 1885, Anschütz made his first chronophotographs of horses, sponsored by the Prussian minister of Culture. Initially, he used 12 cameras, later on 24. The quality of his pictures was generally regarded to be much higher than that of pioneer Eadweard Muybridge's chronophotographic series. He continued with studies of horses in motion at the Königlichen Militärreitinstitut (Royal Military Institute) in Hanover during 1886.

From the beginning, Anschütz wanted to reproduce the recorded actions and worked on devices to enable this. In 1886, he built a machine with a 1.5 m (4 ft 11 in) wheel that had twenty-four, 9 cm × 13 cm (3.5 in × 5.1 in) glass plate photographs attached to its circumference. The pictures were illuminated from behind by a fast succession of electric flashes from a synchronized Geissler tube, while the wheel was hand-cranked to rotate at a speed of approximately 30 frames per second. About four spectators could watch the images on a 12.5 cm (4.9 in) wide milk glass screen in a wall in a small darkened room. Anschütz introduced the first successful model from 19 to 21 March 1887 at the Kultusministerium (Ministry of Culture) in Berlin, receiving much praise from invited colleagues, politicians, and scientists. From 16 July to 26 August 1887, the moving pictures were screened to around 15,000 paying customers at Stadtbahnbogen 21 in the Ausstellungspark in Berlin. During the next few years, Anschütz demonstrated his electrical Schnellseher at many international exhibitions, fairs and conventions, visiting Wiesbaden, Frankfurt and Dresden in 1887, Brussels and Florence in 1888 and Kassel, Saint Petersburg, New York City, Boston, and Philadelphia in 1889.

In 1888, Anschütz moved to a studio at Charlottenstr. 59 in Berlin, where frequent demonstrations of Schnellsehers took place to at least 1900 (and less frequently until years later).

Early January 1890, Anschütz presented a new type of chronophotography on the glass wheel Schnellseher to emperor Wilhelm II's family: "Sprechende Porträts" (Speaking Portraits). He introduced it publicly on 16 January 1890 at the Photographic Association in Berlin.

At the same 16 January 1890 presentation, Anschütz introduced a much smaller Schnellseher in a cabinet that could be mounted to a wall or otherwise placed at eye-height. By the end of the year, he was negotiating with Siemens & Halske about the commercial manufacture of such machines. In 1891, Siemens & Halske started production of a coin-operated peep-hole Electrotachyscope, of which approximately 152 copies were made. This version had eighteen to twenty-four, 9 cm × 12 cm (3.5 in × 4.7 in) celluloid pictures in a 1.25 m (4 ft 1 in) disc. It was demonstrated at the Elektrotechnischen Messe in Frankfurt on 16 May 1891 and exhibited there from 18 July to December, with over 17,000 spectators in the first 2.5 months. Models were demonstrated or installed in Berlin, Warschau, Amsterdam, Brussels und New York. The machine was licensed to Joe Livingston for Schwarz & Co in New York for the US since 9 September 1891, and to Edgar Cohen for worldwide exploitation (except for Germany and the US) since 19 October 1892 (as Electrical Wonder Company from 12 November 1892 to 2 December 1893). Electrotachyscope automats were installed in popular venues in New York, in Paris, in Boston, at The Crystal Palace in London, at the Berlin Zoo, and in more cities. About 34,000 people came to view the motion pictures in July and August 1892 at the Ausstellungspark in Berlin. The Elektrotachyscope was exhibited at the Chicago World's Fair of 1893 as "Greatest Wonder of the World". These machines may have been mistaken for Edison's long-awaited Kinetoscopes that were planned to be installed at the fair, but seem never to have arrived.

Before Siemens & Halske were involved, Anschütz had also developed an automated 65 cm (26 in) cylindrical Schnellseher. It had six milk glass screens, each showing a different scene. This Elektro-tachyscope was shown to paying spectators in Vienna in November 1890, and probably in Brussels in 1891.

In 1893, the Edison Manufacturing Company started the wide distribution of their long-awaited Kinetoscope, which had been in slow development since 1888. After initial experiments based on phonograph cylinders, they had shortly worked on a design based on the Schnellseher automat. Their main ambition was to enable longer motion pictures that ideally would reproduce opera performances in combination with the phonograph. The disc format had therefore been abandoned and experiments continued with celluloid film strips. The eventual coin-operated peep-box Kinetoscope automats did show relatively long scenes, but the company was unable to offer a combination with sound.

When the Electrical Wonder Company went under in 1893, it left Anschütz with a large debt with Siemens & Halske for large orders of Schnellsehers. Siemens & Halske started to commercially exhibit the remaining 52 copies themselves as an attempt to lift some of Anschutz' debt and helped him with the development of his new project that aimed to project motion pictures on a large screen.

On 6 November 1894, Anschütz patented a projector with two intermittently rotating large disks and continuous light. On 25, 29 and 30 November 1894, he introduced his new device with two linked discs projecting the moving images on a 6 by 8 m (20 by 26 ft) screen in the darkened Grand Auditorium of a Post Office Building in Berlin. From 22 February to 30 March 1895 commercial 1,5-hour program of 40 different scenes was screened for audiences of 300 people at the old Reichstag and received around 4,000 visitors.

In 1895, other motion picture pioneers entered the market of motion pictures projected on large screens, including Max and Emil Skladanowsky with their Bioscop, and Auguste and Louis Lumière with their cinematograph. Their films were much longer than the Schnellseher picture loops and after 1895 Anschütz' career in motion pictures was diminished to the sales of home model Tachyscopes at his studio.

== Demonstrations, exhibitions and screenings ==
Inventory of known presentations of Schnellsehers

start	end	venue/event	location	device	audience
21 March 1887	23 March 1887	Kultusministerium demonstration	German Empire (Berlin, Unter dem Linden 4 (mezzanine))	wheel	invited photographers, scientists, politicians
June 1887	September 1887	Ausstellungspark, daily commercial screenings	German Empire (Berlin, Stadtbahnbogen 21)	wheel	paying customers
September 1887	September 1887	Naturforscherversammlung convention demonstration	German Empire (Wiesbaden)	wheel	invited scientists
3 October 1887	3 October 1887	Verein zur Pflege der Photographie und verwandter Künste, two demonstrations + lecture	German Empire (Frankfurt)	wheel	invited photographers and artists
10 October 1887	15 October 1887	Polytechnische Gesellschaft, exhibition	German Empire (Frankfurt, Polytechnische Gesellschaft auditorium)	wheel	
21 March 1887	21 March 1887	Kunstgewerbehalle	German Empire (Dresden, Kunstgewerbehalle)	wheel	
February 1888	1902 (Note: Approximate date)	Anschütz studio, installation with regular presentations, sales	German Empire (Berlin, Charlottenstrasse 59)	all variations?	customers
March 1888	October 1888	Grand Concours International des Sciences et de l'Industrie, exhibition	Belgium, Brussels	wheel	
1888	1888	photographic exhibition	Italy (Florence)	wheel	
August 1889	November 1889	C. B. Richards & Son, regular screenings	United States (New York City, 3 East 14 Street)	wheel	photographic supply store customers?
15 August 1889	15 August 1889	Königlichen Kriegsakademie, Anschütz exhibition	German Empire (Berlin, Dorotheenstraße)	wheel	
1889	1889	Hunting, Fishing and Sports Exhibition	German Empire (Kassel)	wheel	
1889	1889	Exhibition for Photo Dealers and Manufacturers	United States (Boston)	wheel	
1889	1889	photography exhibition	Russian Empire (Saint Petersburg)	wheel	
1889	1889	?	United States (Philadelphia)	wheel	
16 January 1890	16 January 1890	Photographic Association, introduction automat + "Sprechende Porträt"	German Empire (Berlin)	automat + wheel?	
January 1890	January 1890	private introduction of "Sprechende Porträt"	German Empire (Berlin)	wheel	Wilhelm II's family
21 April 1890	22 April 1890	k. k. Graphischer Lehr- und Versuchsanstalt, introduction	Austria-Hungary (Vienna, Westbahnstrasse 25)	cylinder	Josef Maria Eder and invited audience
5 July 1890	November 1890	G. v. d. Lippe, Elektro-Tachyskop, daily commercial exhibition (10 am – 8 pm)	Austria-Hungary (Vienna, Parkring 2)	cylinder	paying customers (30 kreuzer)
1890	1890	?	German Empire, (Weimar)	cylinder	
January 1891	January 1891	Panorama International, daily demonstration Elektro-tachyskop	Hungary (Budapest, Andrässystraße I5)	cylinder?	
16 May 1891	16 May 1891	Elektrotechnischen Messe, automat introduction	German Empire (Frankfurt)	automat	
18 July 1891	December 1891	Elektrotechnischen Messe, daily exhibition (10 am – 9 pm)	German Empire (Frankfurt, Hall for Science and Medicine)	automat	14,858 paid viewings (10 pfennig) until 25 August, over 17.000 by 31 August
July 1891	July 1891	international photography exhibition	Belgium (Brussels)	cylinder?	
1891	1891	photography exhibition	The Netherlands (Amsterdam)	automat	
1891	1891	Stanislaw Jurkowski exhibition	Poland (Warsaw)	automat	
1891	1891	several exhibitions	German Empire (Berlin)	automat	
July 1892	August 1892	Ausstellungspark, daily exhibition	German Empire (Berlin, Stadtbahnbogen 21]	automat	16,618 paying customers in July and 17,271 in August
June 1892	March 1894	The Crystal Palace, permanent installation of two to twelve machines	United Kingdom (London, The Crystal Palace)	automat	
July 1892	July 1892	International Exposition of Photography, two machines installed	France (Paris)	automat	
August 1892	n/a	Eden Musée, five machines installed	United States (New York City, 23rd Street)	automat	
August 1892	n/a	Koster and Bial's Music Hall, one machine installed	United States (New York City, 34th Street and Broadway)	automat	
August 1892	n/a	Am. Inst. Dur. Prdkts, twelve machines installed	United States (New York City)	automat	
August 1892	n/a	Two machines installed	United States (Boston)	automat	
22 December 1892	March 1894	Electric Wonder exhibition, Twelve machines	United Kingdom (London, 425 Strand, later at various Charing Cross addresses)	automat	
1892	n/a	Hohenzollern Gallery	German Empire (Berlin, Hohenzollern Gallery)	automat	
1892	n/a	Berlin Zoo, four machines	German Empire (Berlin, Zoologischer Garten)	automat	
1892	n/a	Leipzig Garten, two machines	German Empire (Berlin)	automat	
1892	n/a	Two machines	German Empire (Hamburg)	automat	
1 May 1893	30 October 1893	World's Columbian Exposition, "Greatest Wonder of the World" machines	United States (Chicago, World's Columbian Exposition's Electricity Building + Midway Pleasance passage)	automat	
3 November 1893	November 1893	Swedish Photographic Exhibition	Sweden (Stockholm)	automat?	
25 November 1894	30 November 1894	Postfuhramtes, projector introduction screenings	German Empire (Berlin, Artilleriestraße, darkened auditorium)	projector	
November 1894	December 1894	Avenida Palace Hotel, Exposicio Imperial, Karl Eisenlohr exhibition	Portugal (Lisbon)	automat?	
22 February 1895	30 March 1895	Reichstag, commercial 1.5 hour screenings	German Empire (Berlin, Leipziger Straße 4)	projector	300 paying spectators per show, 7,000 in March (1 to 1.5 mark
11 May 1895	13 October 1895	Italienischen Ausstellung, thirty machines	German Empire (Hamburg)	automat	56,645 viewings
29 May 1895	June 1895	Carl Henckel's Concert Hall, screenings	German Empire (Hamburg)	projector	
July 1895	August 1895	Exhibition, twelve machines	German Empire (Lübeck)	automat	10,152 viewings

Hardly any differentiation between the many variations of Schnellseher is clear from the available reports. For this table, if no precise information is available, devices exhibited before 1890 are assumed to be rotating wheel Electrotachyscopes, those exhibited in 1890 are assumed to be the cylinder machines and the "Talking Portraits" presentations are assumed to be from wheels. From 16 May 1891 onward, most devices are assumed to be the Siemens & Halske automat.

== Tachyscope home models ==
Anschütz developed four types of a patented "Schnellseher" or "Tachyscope" that were improved versions of the zoetrope.

In September 1887, Anschütz introduced a hand-cranked Tachyscope with a diameter of 58 cm (23 in) and with the choice to look through one of three rows with 19, 20 and 21 apertures. This allowed the use of strips with different amounts of pictures and the choice to view the images either as staying in place or moving around. Scientific chronophotographer Étienne-Jules Marey bought such a Tachyscope in March 1889. It was followed in 1890 by a "Salon Tachyscope" for which the 180 cm (71 in) long picture bands had to be attached to a base to form the zoetrope-type drum. Each strip had the appropriate amount of slots in between the lithographed pictures and the base could be turned into a vertical position. Anschütz produced two simplified versions in 1891. The zoetrope-type Schnellsehers were mainly made for people to use at home and Anschütz probably wanted to make his work available to many people through commercial exploitation, but he was very careful to keep the image quality high and chose to manufacture all image strips personally at his studio, which resulted in relatively small quantities.

At his own studio in Berlin, Anschütz offered hand-cranked home models with glass wheels and Geissler tubes as well as zoetrope Schnellsehers until at least 1905.

== Motion picture works ==
Anschütz made many chronophotography series and adapted at least 60 of them for the Elektrotachyscope. He started with chronophotography studies of horses for the military in 1885. In 1888, he made motion studies of animals in the Breslau Zoo. He also recorded acrobats, dancers, athletes, boxers, wrestlers, sports and horse races. Already more an artistic and skilful photographer than a scientist, he chose different subjects when he started commercially exploiting the Schnellseher as an attraction. He recorded several comical scenes based on everyday life, including Lustige Fahrt (Funny Journey), Zwei ZimmerleuteFrüstückend (Two Carpenters Breakfasting), Familie essend aus einem Topfe (Family Eating from a Single Bowl), Raufende Jungen (Boys Fighting),Zwei Herrn eine Prize Schnupftabak nehmend (Two Men Taking a Pinch of Snuff), Einseifen beim Barbier (Latherin Up at The Barber's),Tabakschnupfender Alter (Old Man Taking Snuff) and Skatspieler (Card Players).

Little of Anschütz' motion picture output has yet resurfaced. Although many examples of his printed chronophotography survived, all that could be found (as of 2016) from his later entertainment-oriented work was a fuzzy image with three card players as seen in a detail of a 1926 photograph of a home model automat Schnellseher.

== Legacy ==
By 1886, when Anschütz developed his first Schnellseher and presented it to family and friends, photographic motion pictures recorded in real-time (known as cinematography) had only been seen from chronophotograph prints in zoetropes or similar devices (and rarely in public). Eadweard Muybridge had mostly shown moving silhouettes traced from his chronophotographs onto glass discs with his zoopraxiscope in lectures since 1880; the only projected photographic moving images he ever made featured a stop motion animation of the skeleton of a horse. The Roundhay Garden Scene, October 1888 by Louis Le Prince, is the oldest known cinematographic film.

Anschütz publicly presented his first Schnellseher in March 1887, presumably as the first device dedicated to the presentation of cinematography. The presentation of his projection Schnellseher on 25 November 1894 was presumably the first public instance of the cinematographic projection.

The Kinetoscope made by the Edison Manufacturing Company was most likely much influenced by the coin-operated Schnellseher automat, but mainly intended to show longer scenes. Of the 22 films produced by the company from 20 May 1891 (Dickson Greeting) to mid-March 1894 (Boxing Match), at least 15 have subjects that are very similar to those found in the works of Anschütz. Although several are logical examples of motion studies, some seem to have been based on (lost) Schnellseher discs. The Barbershop (produced late 1893, premiered 14 April 1894) is probably an extended remake of Anschütz' (lost) Einseifen beim Barbier (1890). Fred Ott's Sneeze was probably based on Tabakschnupfender Alter.

Auguste and Louis Lumière's Partie d’écarté (16 January 1896, the thirteenth Cinématograph production) seems very similar to the one image known from Anschütz' Skatspieler.

== Related devices ==
An earlier, related device is described in the 24 January 1878 issue of the journal Nature.

== See also ==
- Praxinoscope
- Strobe light
- History of film
- History of film technology

== Sources ==
- Who's Who of Victorian Cinema
- Deac Rossell, The Electrical Wonder
- Burns, Paul The History of the wheelovery of Cinematography An Illustrated Chronology
- Fielding, Raymond, 1967, A Technological History of Motion Pictures and Television.
