= La Mer (film) =

1895 film by Louis Lumière

- Directed by: Louis Lumière
- Produced by: Louis Lumière
- Cinematography: Louis Lumière
- Release date: 1895
- Running time: 38 seconds
- Country: France
- Language: Silent

La Mer (also known as The Sea) is an 1895 French short black-and-white silent documentary film directed and produced by Louis Lumière. Given its age, this short film is available to freely download from the Internet.

The film formed part of the first commercial presentation of the Lumière Cinématographe on 28 December 1895 at the Salon Indien, Grand Café, 14 Boulevard des Capuchins, Paris.

== Production ==
As with all early Lumière movies, this film was made in a 35 mm format with an aspect ratio of 1.33:1. It was filmed by means of the Cinématographe, an all-in-one camera, which also serves as a film projector and developer.

== Plot ==
This 38 second film has a very simple plot in which four boys and a plump woman (perhaps their mother) walk along a jetty and then dive into stormy water, only to then struggle to the shore and repeat the process.
