= The Photographical Congress Arrives in Lyon =

1895 film by Louis Lumière

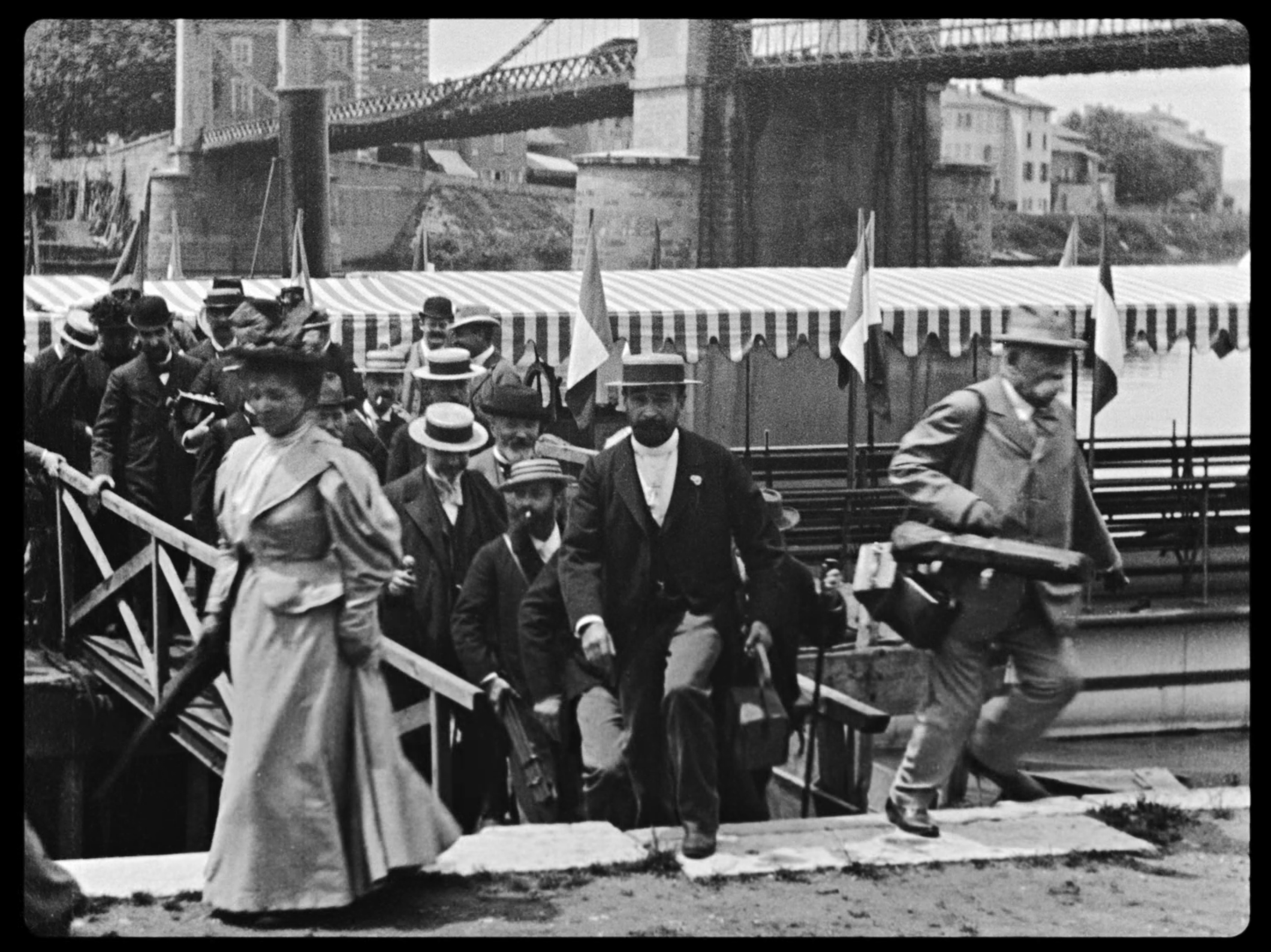
- Screencap from The Photographical Congress Arrives in Lyon
- Directed by: Louis Lumière
- Produced by: Louis Lumière
- Starring: P.J.C. Janssen
- Cinematography: Louis Lumière
- Distributed by: Kino Video (DVD)
- Release date: 12 June 1895
- Country: France
- Language: Silent

The Photographical Congress Arrives in Lyon (also known as Neuville-sur-Saône: Débarquement du congrès des photographie à Lyon) is an 1895 French short black-and-white silent documentary film directed and produced by Louis Lumière and starring P.J.C. Janssen as himself. It was first screened on 12 June 1895.

== Plot ==
The complete film

Photographers leave the deck of a riverboat in large numbers. In the background a bridge can be seen spanning the river. The film covers a group who have assembled in Neuville for the Congress of Photographic Societies. The film was produced in the morning and then screened to the congress that afternoon.

== Production ==
This short documentary was filmed in Neuville-sur-Saône, Rhône, France. It was filmed by means of the Cinématographe, an all-in-one camera, which also serves as a film projector and developer. As with all early Lumière movies, this film was made in a 35 mm format with an aspect ratio of 1.33:1.

== Cast ==
- P.J.C. Janssen as himself

== Current status ==
Given its age, this short film is available to freely download from the Internet. It has also featured in a number of film collections including Landmarks of Early Film volume 1.
