= Le Saut à la couverture =

1895 film by Louis Lumière

- The poster advertising the Lumière brothers cinematographe
- Directed by: Louis Lumière
- Produced by: Louis Lumière
- Cinematography: Louis Lumière
- Release dates: 1895; July 1896 (Finland)
- Running time: 41 seconds
- Country: France
- Language: Silent

Le Saut à la couverture ("Jumping Onto the Blanket"), also known as Brimade dans une caserne ("Bullying in a barracks"), is an 1895 French short black-and-white silent documentary film directed and produced by Louis Lumière.

The film formed part of the first commercial presentation of the Lumière Cinématographe on 28 December 1895 at the Salon Indien, Grand Café, 14 Boulevard des Capuchins, Paris.

== Production ==
As with all early Lumière movies, this film was made in a 35 mm format with an aspect ratio of 1.33:1. It was filmed by means of the Cinématographe, an all-in-one camera, which also serves as a film projector and developer.

== Plot ==
Le Saut à la couverture (1895)

Four men stand holding what appears to be a blanket, while one wearing a hat stands watching. A sixth man then runs towards them and attempts to jump into the blanket. He attempts this unsuccessfully twice in a row failing to jump high enough. On the third attempt he is able to jump and spin in the air, nearly clearing in the blanket. The men who are holding it then flip it a little in the air causing him to fall to the ground. His fourth attempt is more successful and he is able to roll on the blanket and land on his feet at the other side. He runs around for a fifth and final attempt but this is less successful and he gets stuck in the blanket and has difficulty getting out despite the attempts by the four men to throw him free.
