= L'Arroseur Arrosé =

1895 film by Louis Lumière

- Film poster for L'Arroseur Arrosé
- Directed by: Louis Lumière
- Produced by: Louis Lumière
- Starring: François Clerc; Benoît Duval
- Cinematography: Louis Lumière
- Release date: 10 June 1895
- Running time: 45 seconds
- Country: France
- Language: Silent

L'Arroseur Arrosé (French: [la.ʁo.zœʁ a.ʁo.ze]; also known as The Waterer Watered and The Sprinkler Sprinkled) is an 1895 French short black-and-white silent comedy film directed and produced by Louis Lumière and starring François Clerc and Benoît Duval. It was first screened on June 10, 1895.

It is the earliest known instance of film comedy, the first use of film to portray a fictional story, and the first use of a promotional film poster. The film was originally known as Le Jardinier ("The Gardener") or Le Jardinier et le petit espiègle ("The Gardener and the Little Mischievous"), and is sometimes referred to in English as The Tables Turned on the Gardener, and The Sprinkler Sprinkled.

== Plot ==
L'Arroseur Arrosé, 1895

Shot in Lyon in the spring of 1895, the film portrays a simple practical joke in which a gardener is tormented by a boy who steps on the hose that the gardener is using to water his plants, cutting off the water flow. When the gardener tilts the nozzle up to inspect it, the boy steps off of the hose, causing the water to spray the gardener. He is stunned, soaked and his hat is knocked off, but he soon catches on. A chase ensues, both on and off-screen (the camera never moves from its original position) until the gardener catches the boy and administers a spanking. The entire film lasts only 45 seconds, but this simple bit of slapstick may be the forerunner of all subsequent film comedy. The 1896 film version replaces the boy with a teenager and the spanking action is substituted with a kick in the rump.

== Production ==
In the earliest years of the history of film, the cinema was used by pioneers such as Thomas Edison and the Lumières to entertain by the sheer novelty of the invention, and most films were short recordings of mundane events, such as a sneeze, or the arrival of a train. The Lumières took some of the first steps toward narrative film with L'Arroseur arrosé. Given the documentary nature of existing films up until this point, a scripted, comedic film shown among these was unexpected by an audience, enhancing its comedic surprise value.

It was filmed by means of the Cinématographe, (an invention created by the Lumière brothers) an all-in-one camera, which also serves as a film projector and developer. As with all early Lumière movies, this film was made in a 35 mm format with an aspect ratio of 1.33:1.

With their invention, the Lumière brothers were competing with Thomas Alva Edison, in whose laboratories a film camera had already been developed in 1891 with the Kinetograph and who had been producing films for the Kinetoscope, an image viewing device, commercially since 1893.

== Cast ==
Louis Lumière used his own gardener, François Clerc, to portray the gardener. For the mischievous boy, Lumière used a young apprentice carpenter from the Lumière factory who is variously credited as Daniel Duval and Benoît Duval (born 1881). But Léon Trotobas seems to have been the first boy to play the role in La Ciotat.

- François Clerc as Gardener
- Léon Trotobas, then Benoît Duval as Boy (sometimes credited as Daniel Duval)

== Screening history ==
The first screening of L'Arroseur arrosé took place on June 10, 1895, when Louis and Auguste Lumière presented a selection of their films in a larger setting for the first time during a congress of the French Photographers' Association in Lyon, which lasted several days. In the following months, further private screenings of the Lumière films were held for members of photographic and scientific societies, including the first in Belgium in November 1895. L'Arroseur arrosé, then still announced under the title Le Jardinier (The Gardener), was one of the films presented at almost all screenings. Reports of these events in the trade journals aroused great interest in the Cinématographe.

== Poster ==
The poster for L'Arroseur arrosé has the distinction of being the first poster designed to promote an individual film. Although posters had been used to advertise cinematic projection shows since 1890, early posters were typically devoted to describing the quality of the recordings and touting the technological novelty of these shows. The poster for L'Arroseur, illustrated by Marcellin Auzolle, depicts an audience (in the foreground) laughing as the film (in the background) is projected against a screen. It depicts the moment the gardener is splashed in the face, and is thus also the first film poster to depict an actual scene from a film.

== Copies and imitations ==
As copyright law was neither enforced nor yet well-defined for the emerging art of cinema, it was common both for competing filmmakers to reshoot a popular film short and for distributors to duplicate a film print to show as their own. Through these practices, L'Arroseur Arrosé was copied several times and released under a number of different titles in both France and the United States, including at least one remake by the Lumières themselves. Little is known about most of these copies, although one remake was filmed by Georges Méliès, titled L'Arroseur, in 1896. In Britain, The Biter Bit was released in 1899. French New Wave director François Truffaut later included an homage to the gag in his 1958 film, Les Mistons. Fragments of the film are included in a Soviet comedy western "A Man from the Boulevard des Capucines". The 2025 Bi Gan film "Resurrection" includes a similar gag as well as a projection of the film in its entirety in the background of a scene.

== Current status ==
Given its age, this short film is available to freely download from the Internet. It has also featured in a number of film collections including Landmarks of Early Film Volume 1.

== Influence ==
The expression l'arroseur arrosé has entered the French language to mean "the biter bit," "a taste of one's own medicine," or "hoist with his own petard": when a person accustomed to mistreating, defeating, or embarrassing others receives the same treatment.

== See also ==
- Visual gag
