= Bois de Boulogne (film) =

Bois de Boulogne is the title of two short 1896 films, both directed by Georges Méliès and both considered lost:

- Bois de Boulogne (Porte de Madrid)
- Bois de Boulogne (Touring Club)
