= Sinema (disambiguation) =

Kyrsten Sinema (born 1976) is an American politician from Arizona.

Sinema may also refer to:

- Sinema (DVD), a concert DVD by the band Drowning Pool
- Sinema (album), a 2014 album by Swoope
- Sinemart, an Indonesian production film founded in Jakarta
- I Promised The World, a band formerly known as Sinema

== See also ==
- Sinemia, online movie-ticket subscription service
- Cinema (disambiguation)
