= Place des Cordeliers à Lyon =

1895 film directed by Louis Lumière

- The poster advertising the Lumière brothers cinematographe
- Directed by: Louis Lumière
- Produced by: Louis Lumière
- Cinematography: Louis Lumière
- Release date: 1895
- Running time: 44 seconds
- Country: France
- Language: Silent

Place des Cordeliers à Lyon (also known as Cordeliers' Square in Lyon) is an 1895 French short black-and-white silent documentary film directed and produced by Louis Lumière.

The film formed part of the first commercial presentation of the Lumière Cinématographe on 28 December 1895 at the Salon Indien, Grand Café, 14 Boulevard des Capuchins, Paris.

== Production ==
This short documentary was filmed in Place des Cordeliers, Lyon, Rhône, Rhône-Alpes, France. It was filmed by means of the Cinématographe, an all-in-one camera, which also serves as a film projector and developer. As with all early Lumière movies, this film was made in a 35 mm format with an aspect ratio of 1.33:1.

== Synopsis ==
Place des Cordeliers à Lyon (1895)

The film has no plot as such but is instead a stationary camera positioned on the Place des Cordeliers in Lyon. The camera observes the traffic passing along the street, including people walking and a number of horses pulling carriages.

== Current status ==
The existing footage of this film was edited into The Lumière Brothers' First Films published in 1996.
