= Cinema =

Cinema may refer to

- Movie theater (United States), called a cinema elsewhere, a building in which films are shown

== Film ==
- Film or movie, a series of still images that create the illusion of moving image
  - Film industry, the technological and commercial institutions of filmmaking
  - Filmmaking, the process of making a film

== Music ==
=== Bands ===
- Cinema (band), a band formed in 1982 by ex-Yes members Alan White & Chris Squire
- The Cinema, an American indie pop band

=== Albums ===
- Cinema (Andrea Bocelli album), released 2015
- Cinema (The Cat Empire album), released 2010
- Cinema (Elaine Paige album), released 1984
- Cinema (Nazareth album), or the title song, released 1986
- Cinema, a 2009 album by Brazilian band Cachorro Grande
- Cinema, a 1990 album by English musician Ice MC (Ian Campbell), or the title song
- Cinema, a 2004 album by Portuguese musician Rodrigo Leão (musician)
- Cinema, a 2010 album by Karsh Kale
- Cinema, a 2021 album by The Marías

=== Songs ===
- "Cinema" (Yes song), 1983
- "Cinema" (Benny Benassi song), 2011
- "Cinema" (Samuel and Francesca Michielin song), 2021
- "Cinema", a song by CIX, 2021
- "Cinema", a song by Harry Styles from Harry's House
- "Cinema", a song by Stray Kids from Mixtape: Dominate
- "Cinéma", a song by Paola del Medico, Swiss entry in the Eurovision Song Contest 1980
- "Cinema 1", "Cinema 2" and "Cinema 3" by Brockhampton from Saturation III
- "Cinema", a commissioned song produced by Ayase

=== Labels ===
- Cinema (record label), a short-lived electronic record label distributed by Capitol Records

== Television ==
- "Cinema", an episode of the TV series Pocoyo

== See also ==
- Cinematograph, an early term for several types of motion picture film mechanisms
- Cinematography, the art of motion-picture photography
- Home cinema, a home entertainment audio-visual system that aims to replicate the experience of a movie theater
- Scinema, an Australian film festival
- Sinema (disambiguation)
