= Restitution inattendue =

- Color process: Black and white
- Production company: Pathé Frères
- Release date: 1902
- Running time: 1 min
- Country: France
- Language: French

Restitution Inattendue (A Resourceful Waiter) is a 1902 French silent short comedy film, by an unknown director.

== Synopsis ==
At the restaurant, a customer orders a soup and steak. While the waiter is busy making soup, a dog steals his steak from him. The waiter calls the dog and coaxes him to return the steak.

The waiter then serves the food to the customer. At the end, the customer finds the steak tough and annoying.
