= La Voltige =

1895 film by Louis Lumière

- The poster advertising the Lumière brothers cinematographe
- Directed by: Louis Lumière
- Produced by: Louis Lumière
- Cinematography: Louis Lumière
- Release dates: 1895; July 1896 (Finland)
- Running time: 46 seconds
- Country: France
- Language: Silent

La Voltige (also known as Horse Trick Riders) is an 1895 French short black-and-white silent documentary film directed and produced by Louis Lumière. It was filmed in Lyon, France.

The film formed part of the first commercial presentation of the Lumière Cinématographe on December 28, 1895 at the Salon Indien, Grand Café, 14 Boulevard des Capuchins, Paris.

== Production ==
As with all early Lumière movies, this film was made in a 35 mm format with an aspect ratio of 1.33:1. It was filmed by means of the Cinématographe, an all-in-one camera, which also serves as a film projector and developer.

== Plot ==
La Voltige (1895)

Three men and a horse stand in a field. The first man in white holds the reins of the horse, the second man in black stands observing while the third man attempts to mount the horse. After six unsuccessful attempts he is finally able to seat himself and is set to ride off sidesaddle.
