= Les Forgerons =

1895 film by Louis Lumière

- Screencap from Les Forgerons
- Directed by: Louis Lumière
- Produced by: Louis Lumière
- Cinematography: Louis Lumière
- Release dates: 1895; 28 June 1896 (Finland)
- Running time: 49 seconds
- Country: France
- Language: Silent

Les Forgerons (also known as The Blacksmiths) is an 1895 French short black-and-white silent documentary film directed and produced by Louis Lumière. Given its age, this short film is available to freely download from the Internet.

The film formed part of the first commercial presentation of the Lumière Cinématographe on 28 December 1895 at the Salon Indien, Grand Café, 14 Boulevard des Capuchins, Paris.

== Production ==
As with all early Lumière movies, this film was made in a 35 mm format with an aspect ratio of 1.33:1. It was filmed by means of the Cinématographe, an all-in-one camera, which also serves as a film projector and developer.

== Plot ==
Les Forgerons (1895)

Two men stand working as blacksmiths. The one on the left of the screen repeatedly hammers an anvil while the man on the right winds a device. The man of the left then removes the metal he was hammering and places it into a bucket of water. At the end of the film a third man walks onto the screen from the left, with a wine glass and bottle in hand, hands the glass to the smith at the anvil, and begins to pour him a drink.
