= La Pêche aux poissons rouges =

1895 film by Louis Lumière

- The poster advertising the Lumière brothers cinematographe
- Directed by: Louis Lumière
- Produced by: Louis Lumière
- Cinematography: Louis Lumière
- Release date: 1895
- Running time: 38 seconds
- Country: France
- Language: Silent

La Pêche aux poissons rouges is an 1895 French short black-and-white silent actuality film directed and produced by Louis Lumière. It was filmed in Lyon, Rhône, Rhône-Alpes, France. Given its age, this short film is in the public domain and is available to freely download from the Internet.

The film formed part of the first commercial presentation of the Lumière Cinématographe on 28 December 1895 at the Salon Indien, Grand Café, 14 Boulevard des Capucines, Paris.

== Production ==
As with all early Lumière movies, this film was made in a 35 mm format with an aspect ratio of 1.33:1. It was filmed by means of the Cinématographe, an all-in-one camera, which also serves as a film projector and developer.

== Plot ==
La Pêche aux poissons rouges (1895)

A man (Auguste Lumiere) holds his baby daughter (Andrée Lumiere) on a table next to a bowl containing goldfish. The baby begins putting her hand into the water while the man supports her. The scene is filmed by a stationary camera behind the table.
