= Repas de bébé =

1895 motion-picture recording, photographed by Louis Lumière

Le Repas de bébé
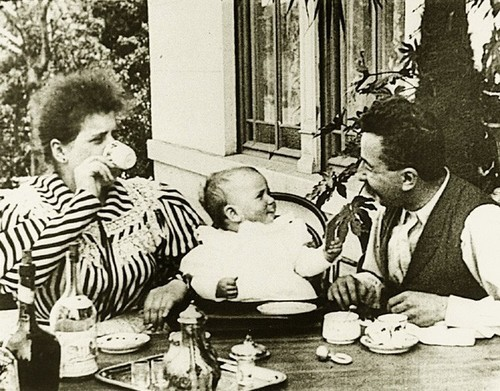
- This undated photogram taken from a copy of the original film reverses the horizontal axis, putting Auguste Lumière on the right side of the frame rather than the left. Tint added to the original black-and-white image.
- Directed by: Louis Lumière
- Produced by: Louis and Auguste Lumière
- Starring: Auguste Lumière; Andrée Lumière; Marguerite Lumière
- Cinematography: Louis Lumière
- Release dates: 10 June 1895 (Lyon); 28 December 1895 (Paris); 20 February 1896 (UK)
- Running time: approx. 40 seconds
- Country: France
- Language: Silent

Repas de bébé (also known as Le Repas de bébé, Le Repas (de bébé), Le Déjeuner de bébé, Baby’s First Meal, Baby’s Breakfast, Baby’s Lunch, Baby's Dinner, Baby's Tea Time, The Family Breakfast, A Baby's Meal, Feeding the Baby, and Feeding Baby) is an 1895 French short black-and-white silent actuality film photographed by Louis Lumière and showing his brother Auguste Lumière and Auguste's wife Marguerite feeding their infant daughter, Andrée Lumière.

One of the earliest recordings made by the brothers Lumière, Le Repas de bébé (catalogued as Vue no. 88) is an unedited, single take of less than a minute. The company's catalog described it as "Un papa fait avaler son déjeuner à un bébé" (a father feeds lunch to a baby) and records that the scene was taken between March 22 and June 10, 1895.

The film formed part of the first commercial presentation of the Lumière Cinématographe on December 28, 1895, at the Salon Indien, Grand Café, 14 Boulevard des Capucines, Paris. It was the seventh of ten films on the program, each 17 meters long.

== Production ==
As with all Lumière movies (1895 to 1905), this film was made in a 35 mm format with an aspect ratio of 1.33:1. Louis Lumière photographed the family trio using the newly-invented Cinématographe, a square box-like camera, which also served as a film projector and developer. The company's films had distinctive rounded corners, usually cropped out of video and still-image reproductions.

== Synopsis ==
Repas de bébé (1895)

Auguste Lumière, his wife Marguerite, and their daughter Andrée sit at a dining table in the garden outside a house. The scene connotes the culture of a bourgeois family, with a silver tea service, a bottle of cognac, and fine clothing. Papa twice spoon-feeds their baby while Mama prepares and drinks a cup of tea. Both dote on the child and talk to her throughout. He then gives the infant a biscuit, which she seemingly offers to someone off-camera. The film ends as Auguste offers bébé a third spoonful.

== Cast ==
- Andrée Lumière as herself, 'Bébé'
- Auguste Lumière as himself
- Marguerite Lumière as herself

== Current status ==
According to Archives françaises du film documentation of 2004: "Pecuniary rights are owned until 2039 by the Association Frères Lumière. Non-pecuniary rights are held by the Lumière estate." Repas de bébé and all other surviving Lumière films are housed and preserved at France's Centre national de la cinématographie (CNC).

The film was seen widely in Lumière Cinématographe shows around the world in 1896 and after. Repas de bébé has been included in a number of film, videotape, DVD, and Blu-Ray compilations including The Lumière Brothers' First Films (1996), Landmarks of Early Film volume 1 (1997), and The Movies Begin: A Treasury of Early Cinema, 1894–1913 (2002). It also forms part of the documentary Visions of Light (1992) and Ann Hu's Chinese feature film Shadow Magic (2000). In 2013, the British Film Institute copyrighted its reproduction, which streams via Alexander Street Press subscription service. Most definitively, in 2015 the Institut Lumière published it among the 114 films on the Blu-Ray and DVD set Lumière! Le Cinématographe 1895-1905. These digital renderings were 4K scans of the best available 35mm film copies (two negatives and three positive prints in the CNC's Archives françaises du film.

== Legacy ==
The footage of the Lumière baby being fed has become an icon of early cinema. Resembling what would later be called a "home movie," it nevertheless made a memorable impression on its first audiences.

In July 1896, Russian writer Maxim Gorky saw a Cinématographe program outside of Moscow and published an account that mentioned the film. Translated into English, Gorky's text ("Last night I was in the Kingdom of Shadows") refers to the film as The Family Breakfast. He describes it as ". . . an idyll of three. A young couple with its chubby first-born is seated at the breakfast table. The two are so much in love, and are so charming, gay and happy, and the baby is so amusing. The picture creates a fine, felicitous impression."

Many historical and scholarly sources have described how some observers said they were captivated by the leaves on the trees moving in the wind. Pioneer filmmaker Georges Méliès told G.-Michel Coissac – author of Histoire du cinematographe (1925) – that he was at the first Paris screening in 1895, at which he and others were struck by the sensation of seeing the trees swaying in the wind. Gorky too said this in his 1896 article.

In 2005, the UNESCO Memory of the World Register added the entry "Lumière Films," specifying this as a collection of all 1,405 extant works. By 1996, the CNC had preserved all of the original nitrate material on polyester safety film.
