= Workers Leaving the Lumière Factory =

1895 film by Auguste and Louis Lumière

Coordinates: 45°44′42.6″N 4°52′10.6″E

Workers Leaving the Lumière Factory in Lyon
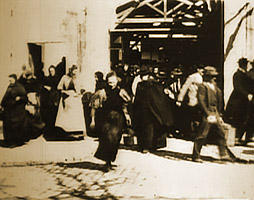
- Screencap from Workers Leaving the Lumière Factory in Lyon
- Directed by: Louis Lumière
- Produced by: Louis Lumière
- Cinematography: Louis Lumière
- Distributed by: Lumière
- Release date: 22 March 1895
- Running time: 46 seconds
- Country: France
- Language: Silent

A version of the film

Workers Leaving The Lumière Factory in Lyon (French: La Sortie de l'Usine Lumière à Lyon), also known as Employees Leaving the Lumière Factory and Exiting the Factory, is an 1895 French short black-and-white silent documentary film directed and produced by Louis Lumière. It is often referred to as the first real motion picture ever made, although Louis Le Prince's 1888 Roundhay Garden Scene pre-dated it by six and a half years.

== Content ==
Three separate versions of this film exist, which differ from one another in numerous ways- the clothing style changes demonstrating the different seasons in which they were filmed. They are often referred to as the "one horse", "two horses", and "no horse" versions, in reference to a horse-drawn carriage that appears in the first two versions (pulled by one horse in the original and two horses in the first remake). The collection of Institute Lumière contains a fourth film with the same theme, but very different architecture, and has been estimated to date from February 1897.

Another film with the same theme, presumably made in 1896, features another factory (or another entrance to the same factory) with different people. Unlike the people in most of Lumière's films, many of the subjects look at the camera.

== Production ==
This film was made in the 35 mm format with an aspect ratio of 1.33:1, and at a speed of 16 frames per second. At that rate, the 17 meters of film length provided a duration of 46 seconds, holding a total of 800 frames.

The place where the "Workers Leaving the Lumière Factory" was filmed is located 8th arrondissement of Lyon in Monplaisir, the street has since been renamed "rue du Premier-Film" (Note: Street of the first movie) and the factory is now known as the Institut Lumière, a museum dedicated to cinema history and the headquarters of the institute created in 1982 by Bernard Chardère and Maurice Trarieux-Lumière, the grandson of Louis Lumière.

== Early screenings ==
Louis Lumière first showed a film of workers leaving the factory on 22 March 1895, in Paris, at a meeting of the Société d'Encouragement pour l'Industrie Nationale. The screening was part of his lecture on the industrial production of photographic plates in his family's factory, with the projection of photographic slides in colour (made with the Lippmann plate method) expected to be the highlight. Lumière was surprised when the audience, a few dozen invited guests, were much more enthusiastic about the film and demanded a repeated projection of the curiously detailed and lively action. Léon Gaumont, later founder of the Gaumont film production and distribution company, is said to have attended the presentation. A few weeks later, on 16 April, Lumière presented the same film at the Réunion de sociétés savantes des départements de la Sorbonne in Paris. It has been suggested that the film presented at these events was a version shot on paper film that has since been lost.

Based on the shadows of the architecture, the oldest extant version has been dated to 26 May 1895. It presumably debuted on 10 June 1895, along with seven other films, at the Union nationale des sociétés photographique de France, in Lyon. The film remained part of the program for the nine other known screenings of 1895, including the first commercial screening on 28 December 1895 in Paris.

A version dated to 10 March 1896 was perhaps first shown on 10 July in New York, and a version dated to 15 August 1896 presumably premiered as Nouvelle sortie de l'usine Lumière on 4 October 1896 in Lyon.

== Current status ==
Given its age, this short film is available to freely download from the Internet. It has also featured in a number of film collections including Landmarks of Early Film volume 1, The Movies Begin - A Treasury of Early Cinema, 1894 - 1913 and The Lumière Brothers' First Films.

The film has been known by a large number of alternative titles in France and the United States over the years since its production including La Sortie des Usines Lumière à Lyon-Montplaisir, Sortie de l'Usine Lumière, La Sortie des Usines, Les ouvriers et ouvrières sortant de l'Usine Lumière, Employees Leaving the Lumière Factory, Leaving the Factory, Workers Leaving the Lumière Factory, Lunch Hour at the Lumière Factory, Dinner Hour at the Factory Gate of M. Lumière at Lyon, Exiting the Factory, La Sortie des ouvriers de l'Usine Lumière.

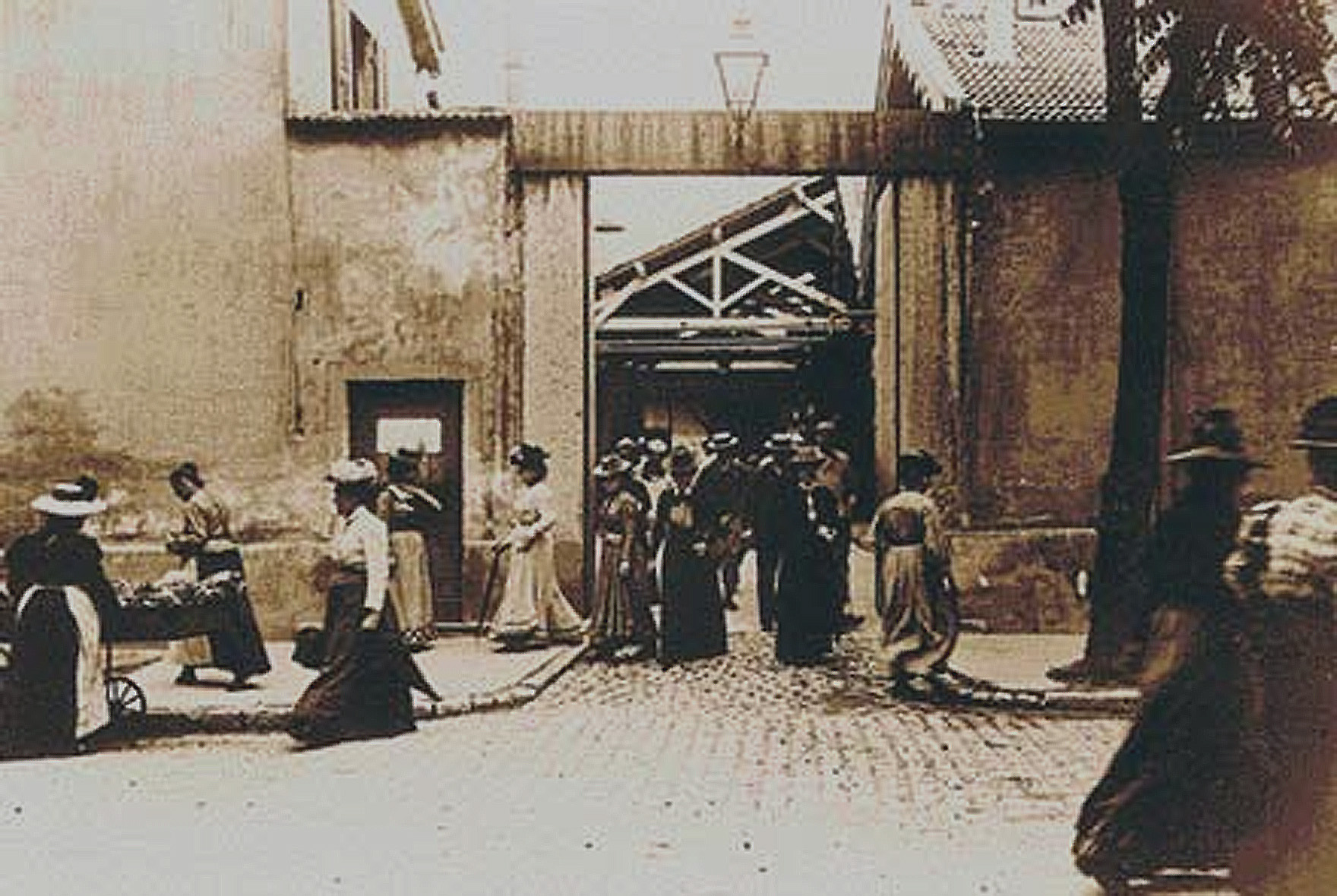
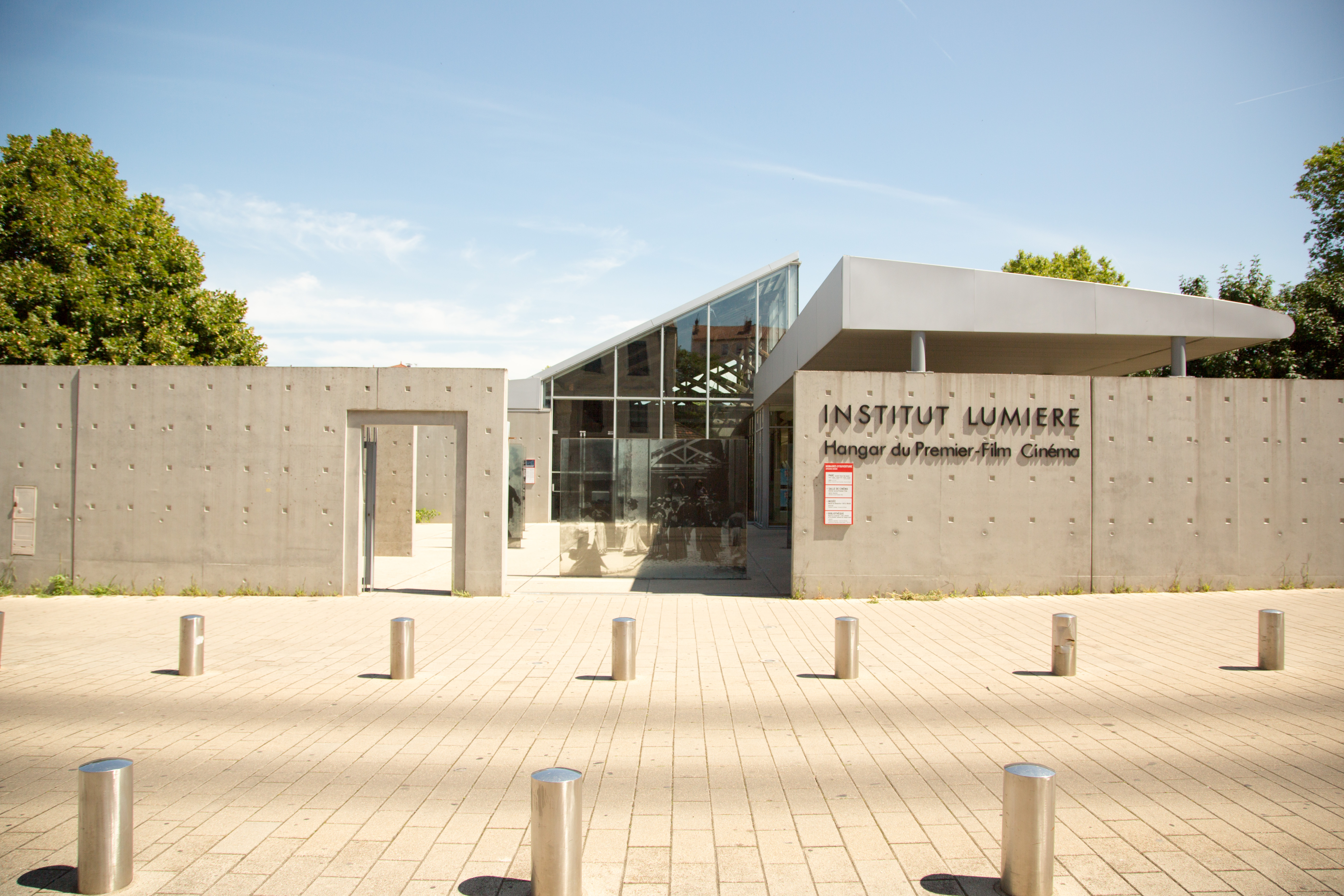
The entrance to the Institut Lumière in 2014, with a glass projection displaying a frame from the film where factory workers were captured on film leaving the factory

== See also ==
- List of films in the public domain in the United States
- Roundhay Garden Scene, 1888 film

== Sources ==
- Chardère, Bernard; Borgé, Guy; Borgé, Marjorie (1985). Les Lumière (in French). Paris: Bibliothèque des Arts. ISBN 2-85047-068-6.
