= Auguste Lumière =

French inventor (1862–1954)

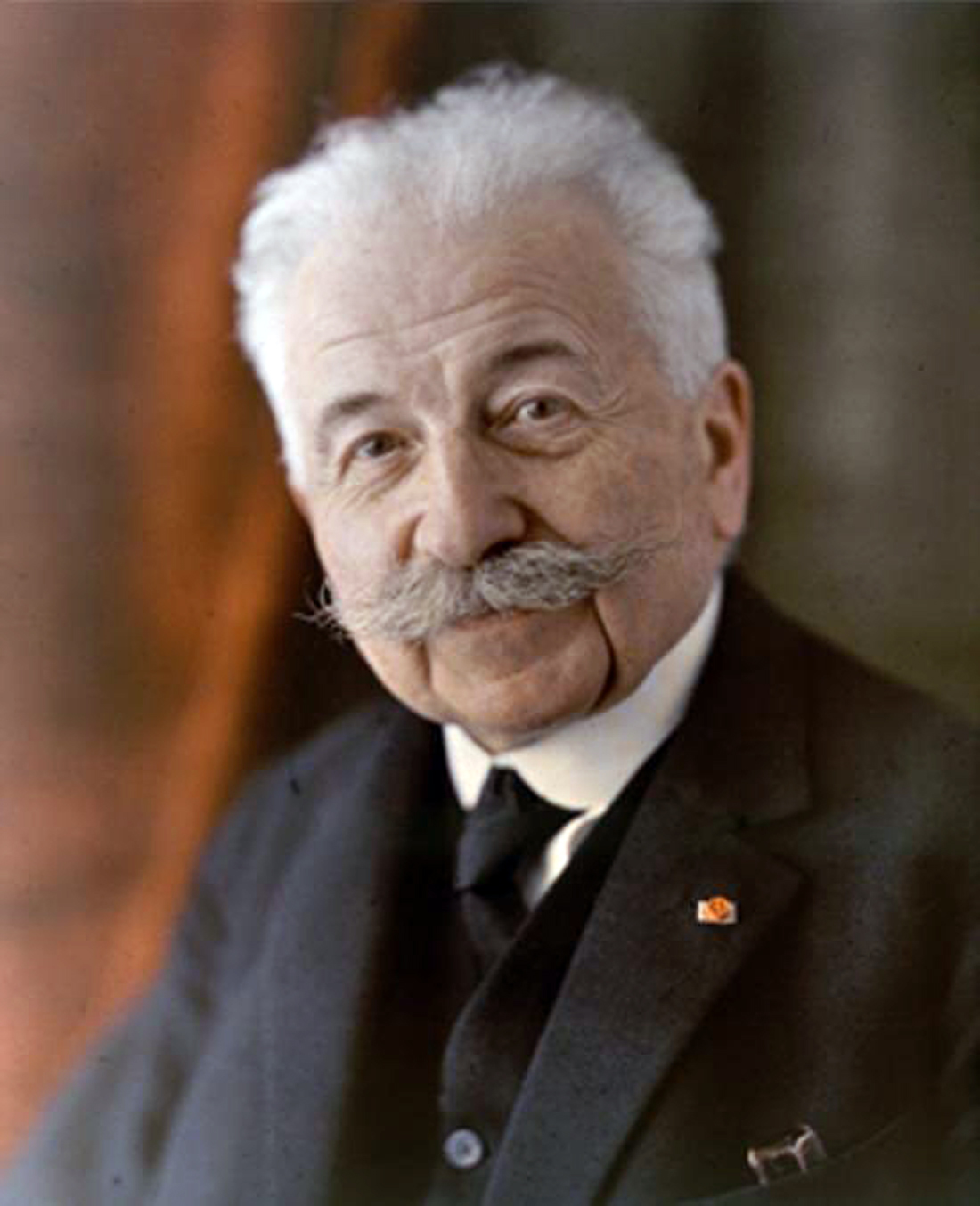
- Lumière, c. 1935
- Born: Auguste Marie Louis Nicolas Lumière; 19 October 1862; Besançon, France
- Died: 10 April 1954 (aged 91); Lyon, France
- Relatives: Louis Lumière (brother)
- Engineering career
- Projects: Cinematograph
- Awards: Star on the Hollywood Walk of Fame (1960)

Auguste Marie Louis Nicolas Lumière (French: [oɡyst maʁi lwi nikɔla lymjɛʁ]; 19 October 1862 – 10 April 1954) was a French engineer, industrialist, biologist, and illusionist. In 1894 and 1895, he and his brother Louis invented an animated photographic camera and projection device, the cinematograph, which met with worldwide success.

== Life ==
Lumière was born in Besançon. He attended the Martinière Technical School and worked as a manager at the photographic company of his father, Claude-Antoine Lumière. He was invited to attend a demonstration of the Kinetoscope invented by Thomas Edison, which inspired his and his brother's work on the cinematograph. The brothers screened their first film using this device in December 1895, and following the success of this initial venture opened a number of cinemas worldwide. However, Auguste was skeptical of the potential of the device, remarking "My invention can be exploited... as a scientific curiosity, but apart from that it has no commercial value whatsoever".

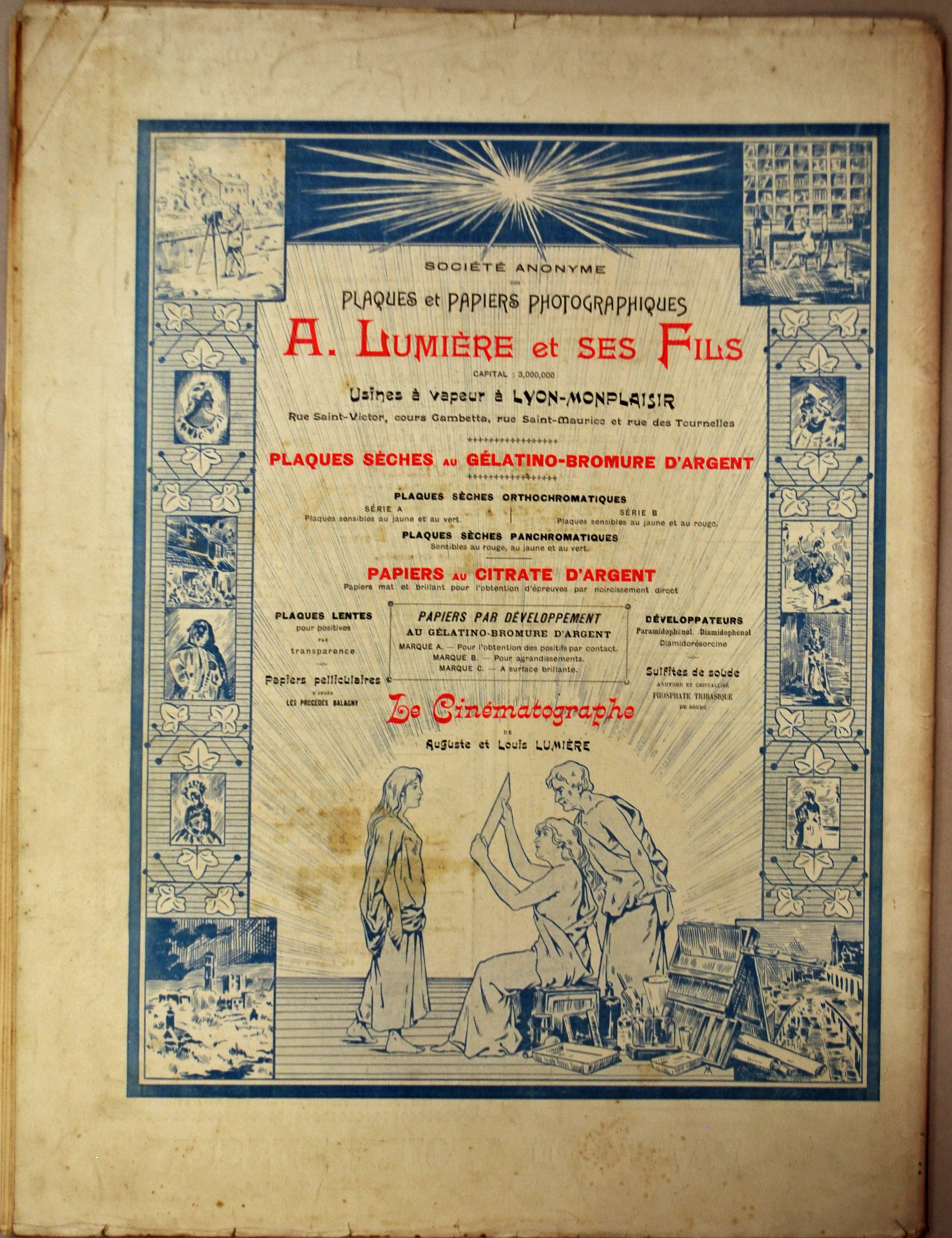
Advertisement in Paris-Noël, 1897

After his work on the cinematograph Lumière began focusing on the biomedical field, becoming a pioneer in the use of X-rays to examine fractures. He also contributed to innovations in military aircraft, producing a catalytic heater to allow cold-weather engine starts. He died in Lyon, aged 91.
