= Louis Lumière =

French inventor (1864–1948)

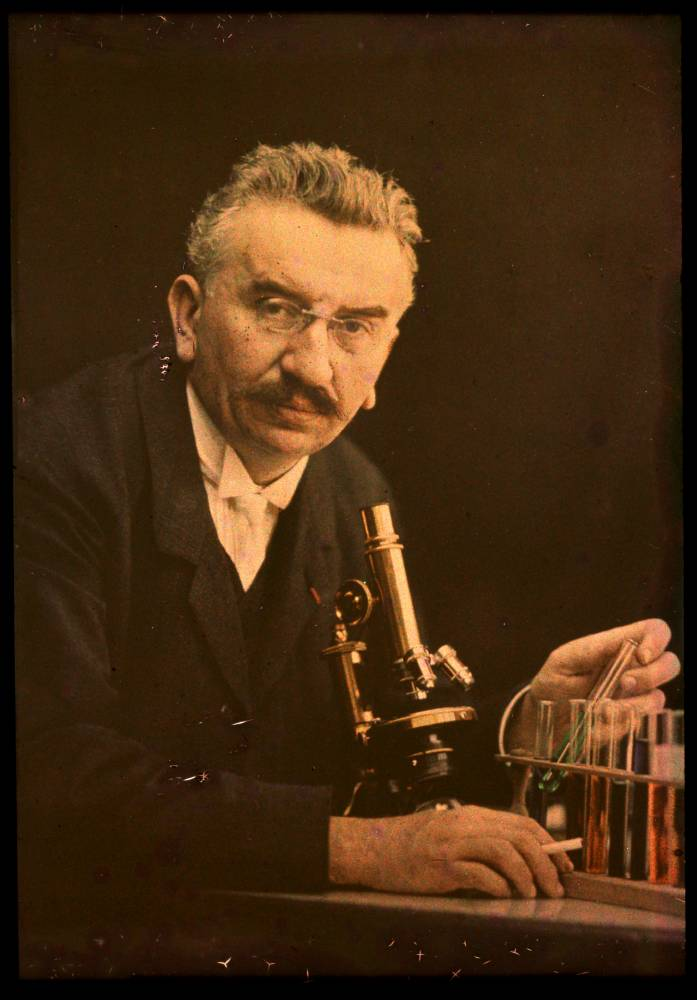
- Born: Louis Jean Lumière; 5 October 1864; Besançon, France
- Died: 6 June 1948 (aged 83); Bandol, France
- Relatives: Auguste Lumière (brother)
- Engineering career
- Projects: Cinematograph
- Awards: Grand Cross of the Legion of Honour (1939); star on the Hollywood Walk of Fame (1960)

Louis Jean Lumière (French: [lwi ʒɑ̃ lymjɛʁ]; 5 October 1864 – 6 June 1948) was a French engineer and industrialist who played a key role in the development of photography and cinema.

== Early life and education ==
Lumière was one of four children of Claude-Antoine Lumière, a photographer and painter, and his wife Jeanne-Joséphine (née Costille). At the Martinière Technical School he gained highest marks in his class.

== Career ==
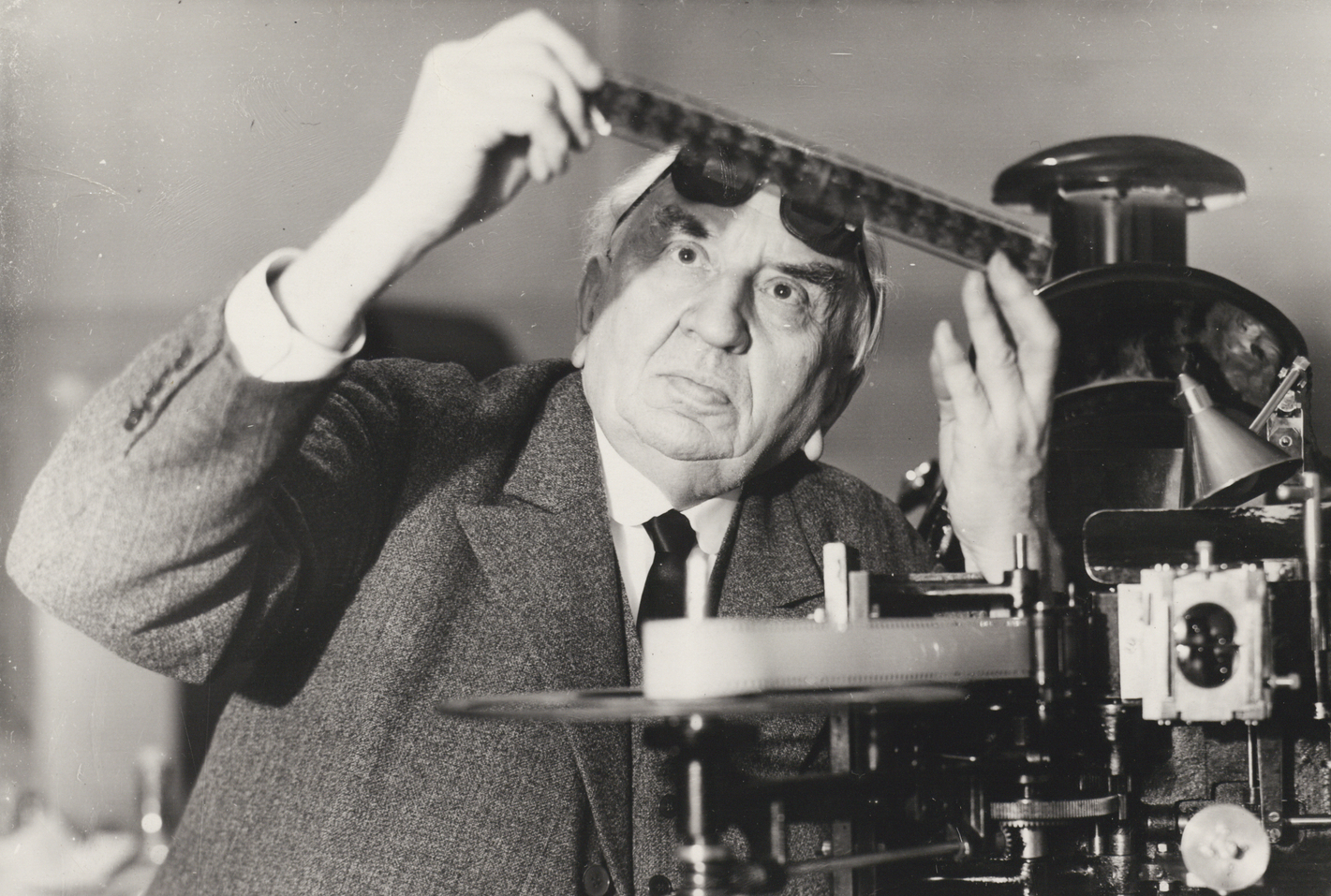
Louis Lumière, examining film (1935)

At age 17, Lumière invented a new process for film development using a dry plate. This process was significantly successful for the family business, permitting the opening of a new factory with an eventual production of 15 million plates per year. Thomas Edison's Kinetoscope inspired his and his brother's subsequent work on the cinematograph.

Louis Lumière is most often associated with his brother, Auguste Lumière, under the name of the Lumière brothers. This comparison is a little excessive with regard to the invention of the cinematograph, since in reality, Auguste failed in his attempt to manufacture the first machine and passed it to his brother who made the invention succeed. On the other hand, Louis was also the director of all the first animated photographic views of the Lumière Society, which Auguste sometimes attended only as an amateur actor (Le Repas de bébé, La Pêche aux poissons rouges, Démolition d'un mur, etc.). But the contract signed between the two brothers provided that they be systematically associated, both morally and financially, in all their work and discoveries.
