= Cinematograph =

Motion picture film camera which also serves as a projector and printer

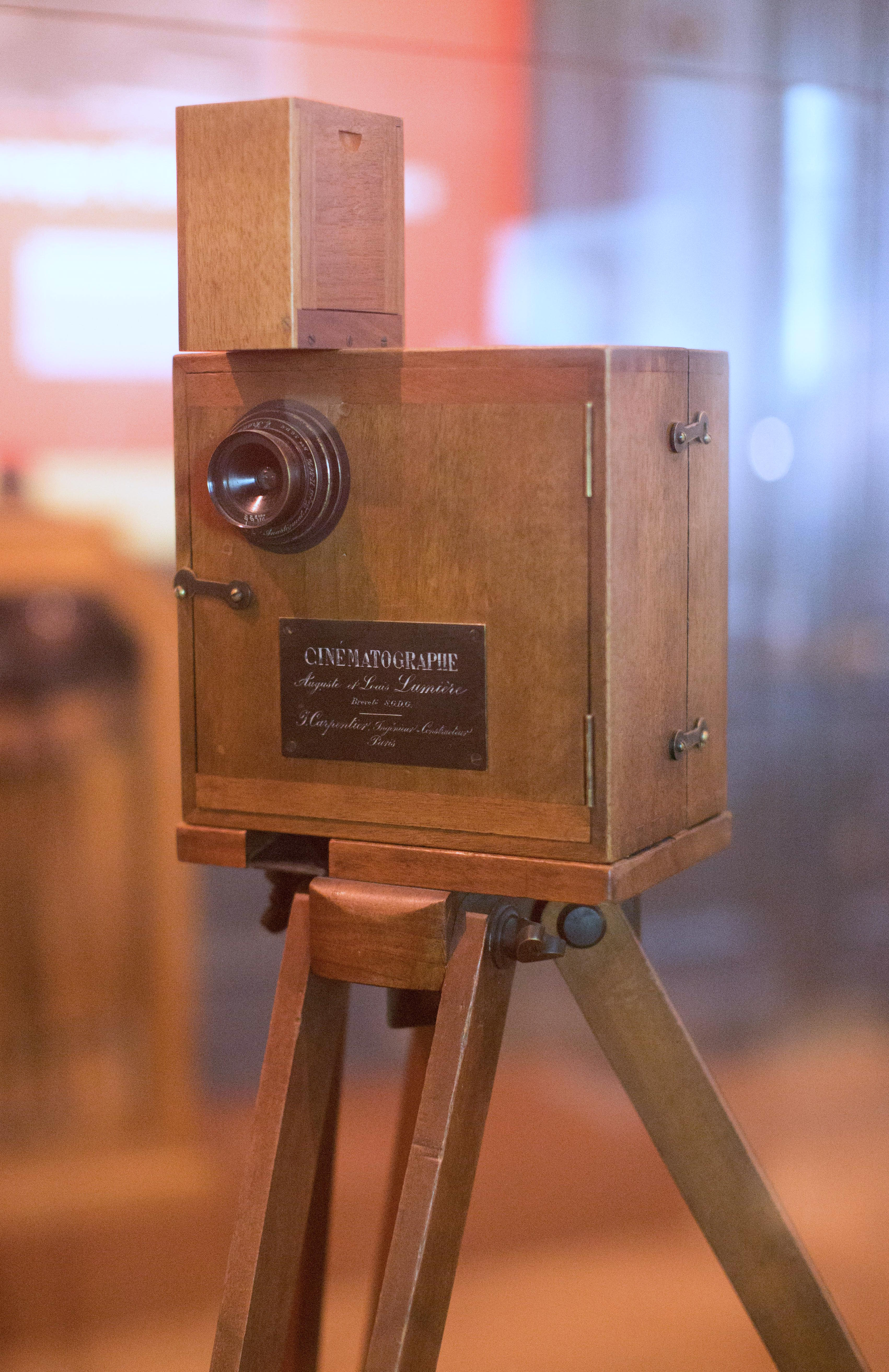
Cinématographe Lumière at the Institut Lumière, France

A cinematograph or kinematograph was an early motion picture film mechanism of various kinds. The name was originally used for machines that combined the functions of a movie camera and of a film projector, and in the case of the Cinématographe Lumière, also means to print films from the negative. The term would also be used for separate devices, and became the root for the now more common terms "cinematography" and "cinema".

== Before the Cinématographe Lumière ==
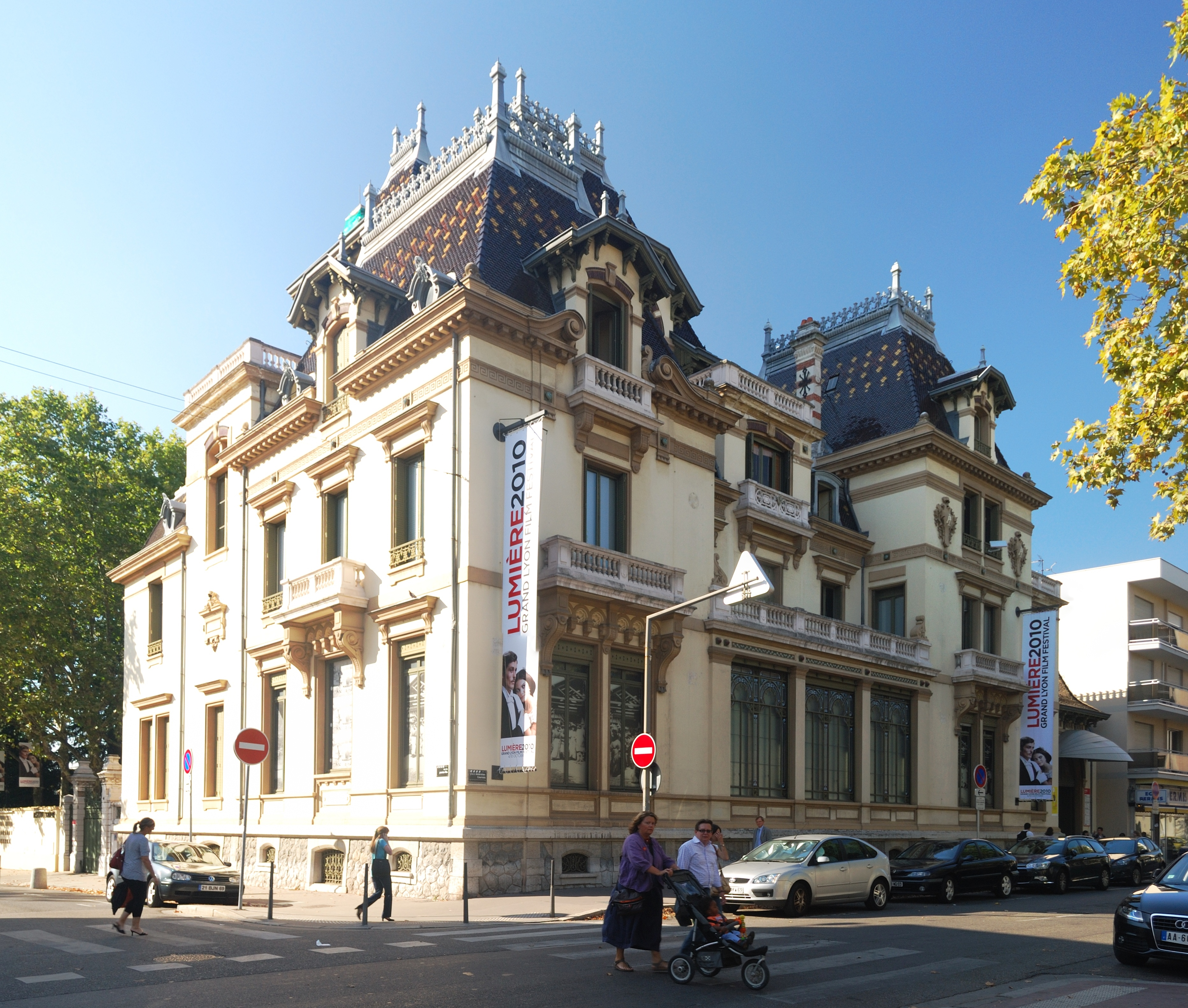
The Institut Lumière in Lyon, France

Soon after photography was introduced in 1839, people figured that the images could be combined with the principle of the phenakistiscope. Besides some experiments with short sequences of stop motion or posed phases of a movement, not much would be achieved until a sufficient amount of successive images could be captured fast enough. Although much work was done on diminishing exposures times for instantaneous photography, it took several decades before motion sequences would be recorded in real-time.

Eadweard Muybridge's well-published 1878 introduction of chronophotography inspired many attempts to further develop the technology. Muybridge's small pictures were almost immediately placed in zoetropes to view them in action, and Muybridge developed his zoopraxiscope to project animated contours of his images as a core element of the many lectures he gave from 1880 to 1895.

In 1887, Ottomar Anschütz introduced the first version of his Elektrische Schnellseher, a.k.a. Electrotachyscope, which presented the action of his chronophotographic sequences on a small glass screen for small audiences. The many exhibitions of the Electrotachyscope in large cities across Europe and the United States drew many paying visitors, with the mechanism changed to a peep-box format for individual viewers by 1890. Anschütz did not limit his subjects to the animal and human locomotion commonly seen in chronophotography, but clearly aimed at entertainment for the general public in the presented actions of acrobats, dancers, athletes, horse races, and comical scenes based on everyday life. The technology and peep-box format inspired the earliest prototypes of the Kinetoscope built by Thomas Edison's company, while many of the early films they produced for the definitive version they eventually introduced in 1893 and successfully marketed across the United States and Europe in 1894 showed subjects resembling those seen in the machines of Anschütz.

French inventor Léon Bouly coined the term "Cinématographe" (from the Greek for "writing in movement"), documented in his patent for 'an instantaneous photography apparatus for the automatic and uninterrupted acquisition of a series of analytical photographs of movement or other phenomena', entered on 12 February 1892. By turning a handle, a padded pressure plate intermittently stopped the film that was transported by a rotating cylinder. On 27 December 1893, Bouly filed a patent for an improved "cinématographe Léon Bouly", a very similar device, but now "reversible", so that it could also intermittently project the images on a screen. At least three different Bouly cinematographs were actually constructed, but his patents lapsed at the end of 1894 because the annual fees were only paid once, and Bouly seems to have abandonded the project.

== 1894–1895 ==
On 26 December 26 1894, the Lyon républicain reported that the Lumière brothers were working on a new kinetograph (a name for the camera that recorded the pictures for the kinetoscope viewer). The brothers filed a patent for their 'apparatus for obtaining and viewing chronophotographic prints' on 13 February 1895, which would eventually receive four additions (on 30 March and 6 May 1895, 28 March and 18 November 1896).

Louis Lumière presented his first film, Workers Leaving the Lumière Factory (Sortie de l'usine Lumière de Lyon) on 22 March 1895, in Paris, at the Society for the Development of the National Industry. The screening was part of his lecture on the industrial production of photographic plates in his family's factory, with the projection of photographic slides in colour (made with the Lippmann plate method) expected to be the highlight. Lumière was surprised when the audience, a few dozen invited guests, were much more enthusiastic about the film and demanded a repeated projection of the curiously detailed and lively action. Léon Gaumont, later founder of the Gaumont film production and distribution company, is said to have attended the presentation. A few weeks later, on 16 April, Lumière presented the same film at the Réunion de sociétés savantes des départements de la Sorbonne in Paris.

The first commercial, public screening of cinematographic films happened on 20 May 1895 at 156 Broadway, New York City, when the "Eidoloscope", invented by Woodville Latham and Eugene Lauste was presented. Nonetheless, this has often been incorrectly attributed to the first Lumière show on 28 December 1895 at Salon Indien du Grand Café in Paris, which was organised by the Lumière brothers. This presentation featured ten short films, including a new version of Workers Leaving the Lumiere Factory. Each of these early films was 17 meters long (approximately 56 feet), which, when hand cranked through a projector, ran approximately 50 seconds.

== Technical details of the Cinématographe Lumière ==
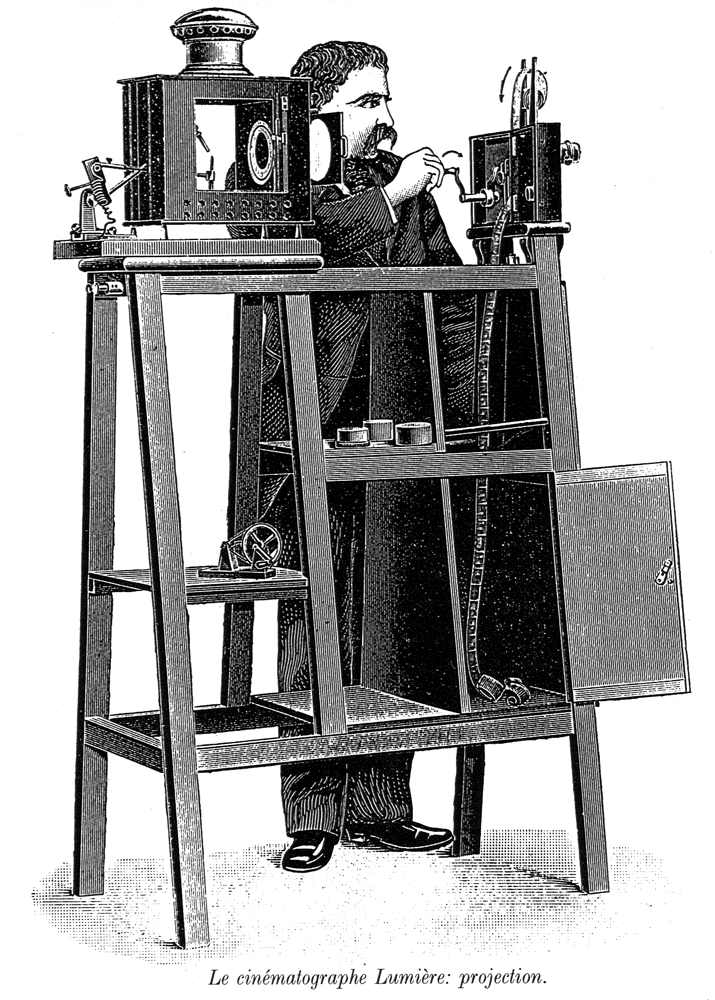
The Cinématographe Lumière in projection mode

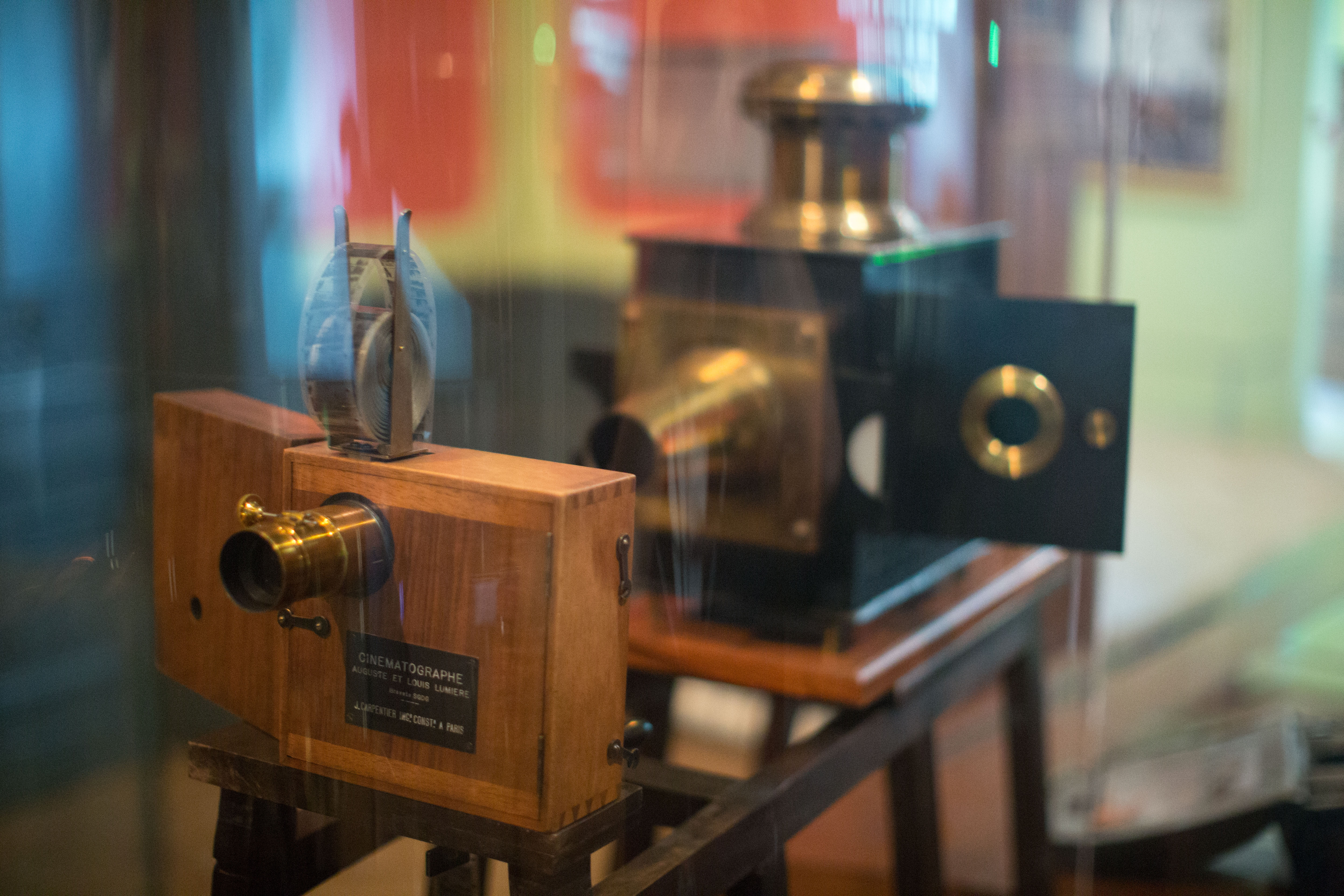
The Cinématographe Lumière at Institut Lumière

The Lumières' company previously had success with photographic dry plates that were much easier to use and faster than earlier wet plate processes. With the many amateur photographers among their clientele, simplicity of the design remained key in all phases of development. Where the kinetoscope as main competitor was bulky, needed electricity and Edison's company had its own experts producing the moving images with a single camera installed in a small studio, the use of the Cinématographe Lumière should be about as simple and economic as that of a common photographic camera. An important aspect was the reversible role: the same machine was used for taking pictures as well as for viewing pictures, and on top of what Bouly's patents had already envioned, printing (or copying) a positive film from the negative could also be done with the Cinématographe Lumière. The device weighed only 16 lb (7.3 kg), which allowed for ease of transportation and placement. Printing only needed the addition of products for development and fixation that photographers were familiar with, while projection only needed a source of light and a flat surface in a dark space, as well-known from magic lantern shows and the camera obscura.

To project the images in their 1895 presentations, the Lumières used a common magic lantern, produced by Alfred Molteni.

The Cinématographe Lumière used the same 35 mm gauge and 1.33 aspect ratio film stock format as the kinetoscope, but with a single perforation on each side of each frame (rather than the four in the kinetoscope). Although operated manually, the Lumières advocated a 15 frames per second speed, and typically recorded about 50 seconds of action in 800 pictures. The stroboscopic presentations thus were below the flicker fusion threshold, resulting in a slightly distracting shimmer that was identified as a shortcoming by Jules Janssen at the 12 June 1895 convention, and by many later commenters.

The Lumières and film historians often emphasised the relevance of the triangular cam that enabled the intermittent transport of film. This mechanism was already considered 'very widespread' in Franz Reuleaux's kinematics textbook Cinématique (1877), which prominently featured an illustration of it on the frontispiece, similar to a figure in Charles Laboulaye’s earlier Traité de cinématique (1854). Other intermittent mechanisms had been applied in Wordsworth Donisthorpe's 1889 patented kinesigraph, Marey's chronophotographic camera, and Edison's kinetographic camera. The kinetoscope had continuous transport and used a shutter to keep the illumination very brief, which diminished the brightness of the image considerably. As Marey had pointed out when discussing reversible chronophotographic systems in an 1894 book, exposures need to be minimised while recording motion, but maximised for projection to let a sufficient amount of light pass through each transparent image during the brief moment it is held still. The Cinématographe Lumière therefore initially featured a shutter that could be adjusted for the different operations. By February 1896, Louis Lumière had noticed that sequences with perfectly sharp pictures produced an undesirable jerky effect when representing sudden movement, and therefore decided on a fixed shutter and the addition of a lens diaphragm to regulate the amount of light (as in still photography). Although (chrono)photographers typically detested motion blur, it turned out to make very fast movements look more natural in motion pictures.

In 1897, the Lumières further added to their invention by using a glass flask of water as the condenser to concentrate the light onto the film frame and to absorb heat. The flask also acted as a safety feature, as the light would no longer focus on the flammable film if the glass were to break due to overheating or accident.

== Popularity ==
After the success of the Lumières's initial public screening in 1895, the Cinématographe became a popular attraction for people all over the world. The Lumière brothers took their machine to China and India and it was enjoyed by people of all classes and social standings. The Cinématographe was used to show films in nickelodeons, where even the poorest classes could pay the entry fee. It was exhibited at fairs and used as entertainment in vaudeville houses in both Europe and the United States. While vaudeville is typically associated with the working and middle classes, the machine also found its way into more sophisticated venues, where it appealed to the artistic tastes of high society.

== Decline ==
Despite the emphasis on reversibility when the machine was developed, it was abandoned after a few years. In practice, cinematography was not practiced by many amateurs, while theatrical screenings of motion pictures became a very popular form of entertainment. The production of the images thus generally remained centralised and professionalised, with growing demand for specialised cameras and specialised projectors rather than for a simple machine that combined these functions.

== See also ==
- Bioscop
- Biograph
- Electrotachyscope
- Film
- Image
- Kinetoscope
- List of film formats
- Panoptikon
- Pleograph
- Praxinoscope
- Vitascope
- Zoopraxiscope

== Notes ==
=== References ===
Ang, Tom. 2019. Photography: History, Art, Technique, 2005–2019.
