= List of motion picture film formats =

This list of motion picture film formats catalogues formats developed for shooting or viewing motion pictures, ranging from the Chronophotographe format from 1888, to mid-20th century formats such as the 1953 CinemaScope format, to more recent formats such as the 1992 IMAX HD format.

To be included in this list, the formats must all have been used in the field or for test shooting, and they must all use photochemical images that are formed or projected on a film base, a transparent substrate which supports the photosensitive emulsion. As well, the formats must have been used to make more than just a few test frames. The camera must be fast enough (in frames per second) to create an illusion of motion consistent with the persistence of vision phenomenon. The format must be significantly unique from other listed formats in regard to its image capture or image projection. The format characteristics should be clearly definable in several listed parameters (e. g., film gauge, aspect ratio, etc.).

== Legend ==
- Format is the name of the process; some formats may have multiple names in common usage.
- Creator is the individual or company most directly attributable as the developer of the system.
- Year created usually refers to the earliest date that the system was used to completion (i.e. projection), but may refer to when it was developed if no known film was made.
- First known film is the first film (not including tests) made with the format and intended for release.
- Negative gauge is the film gauge (width) used for the original camera negative.
- Negative aspect ratio is the image ratio determined by the ratio of the gate dimensions multiplied by the anamorphic power of the camera lenses (1× in the case of spherical lenses).
- Gate dimensions are the width and height of the camera gate aperture, and by extension the film negative frame.
- Negative pulldown describes the film perforations per frame, the direction of film transport, and standard frame speed. Film transport is assumed to be vertical unless otherwise noted, and standard frame speed is assumed to be 24 frames per second unless the film is otherwise noted or has no standard. Silent film has no standard speed; many amateur formats have several common speeds, but no standard.
- Negative lenses indicates whether spherical (normal) or anamorphic lenses are used on the original camera negative, and if anamorphic lenses, what anamorphic power is used.
- Projection gauge is the film gauge (width) used for the release print.
- Projection aspect ratio is the image ratio determined by the ratio of the projection dimensions multiplied by the anamorphic power of the projection lenses (1× in the case of spherical lenses). This is also known as the intended theatrical aspect ratio.
- Projection dimensions are the width and height of the projector aperture plate, and by extension the film frame area which is projected. The aperture plate always very slightly crops the frame.
- Projection lenses indicates whether spherical (normal) or anamorphic lenses are used on the projector, and if anamorphic lenses, what anamorphic power is used.

Formats are listed in chronological order and by release date in the case of multiple formats within one year, if this can be determined. Undated formats are listed at the bottom in alphabetical order.

== Film formats ==
The table does not cover 3D film systems or color film systems, nor is it well-suited to emphasize the differences between those systems.

Format	Creator	Est.	First known work	Negative gauge	Negative A/R	Gate dims	Negative pulldown	Negative lenses	Projection gauge	Projection A/R	Projection dims	Projection lenses
Chronophotographe	Étienne-Jules Marey	1888	motion analysis studies	90 mm	1.00	3.543" × 3.543"	unperforated	spherical				
Paper film	Louis Le Prince	1888	Roundhay Garden Scene	65 mm	1.00		unperforated	spherical	not known	1.00		spherical
Machine Camera	Wm. Friese-Greene	1889	Hyde Park Corner & Marble Arch	65 mm	1.00		pin wheel perforation	spherical				
Kinetoscope cylinder	Wm. Dickson & T. Edison	1889 or 1890	Monkeyshines, No. 1	strip rolled around a cylinder			unperforated	spherical				spherical
Kinesigraph	Wordsworth Donisthorpe	1890 or 1891	view of Trafalgar Square	70 mm	1.00		unperforated	spherical				
Friese-Greene	Wm. Friese-Greene	1891	King's Road, Chelsea, London	60 mm	1.325		8 round perfs, 2 sides	spherical				
Kinetoscope horizontal	Wm. Dickson & William Heise	1891	Dickson Greeting	19 mm			6 perf, 1 side, horizontal	spherical				spherical
Silent film standard	Wm. Dickson & T. Edison	1892	Blacksmith Scene	35 mm	1.33	0.980" × 0.735"	4 perf, 2 sides	spherical	35 mm	1.33	0.931" × 0.698"	spherical
Bioscop	Max Skladanowsky	1892	footage of Emil Skladanowsky	54 mm			unperforated (camera); 4 perf, 2 sides (projection)	spherical	54 mm (two strips interleaved)			spherical
Eidoloscope	Woodville Latham	1895	Griffo-Barnett Prize Fight	51 mm	1.85	1.457" × 0.787"	4 perf, 2 sides	spherical	51 mm	1.85		spherical
Cinematographe	Lumière Brothers	1895	La Sortie des Usines Lumiere	35 mm	1.33	0.980" × 0.735"	1 perf, 2 sides (rounded)	spherical	35 mm	1.33		spherical
Biograph	Wm. Dickson & Herman Casler	1895	Sparring Contest at Canastota	68 mm	1.35	2.625" × 1.938"	1 perf, 2 sides (punched in-camera)	spherical	68 mm			spherical
Joly-Normandin	Henri Joly	1895		60 mm			5 perf, 2 sides	spherical	60 mm			spherical
Biographe	Demeny-Gaumont	1896		60 mm	1.40	1.750" × 1.250"	unperforated	spherical	60 mm	1.40		spherical
Chronophotographe	Demeny-Gaumont	1896		60 mm	1.40	1.750" × 1.250"	4 perf, 2 sides	spherical	60 mm	1.40		spherical
Sivan-Dalphin	Casimir Sivan and E. Dalphin	1896		38 mm			2 perf, 2 sides	spherical	38 mm			spherical
Veriscope	Enoch Rector	1897	The Corbett-Fitzsimmons Fight	63 mm	1.66	1.875" × 1.125"	5 perf, 2 sides	spherical	63 mm			spherical
Viventoscope	Thomas Henry Blair	1897		48 mm	1.50	1.500" × 1.000"	1 perf?	spherical	48 mm			spherical
Birtac	Birt Acres	1898	unknown (amateur format)	17.5 mm			2 perf, 1 side	spherical	17.5 mm			spherical
Biokam	T. C. Hepworth	1899	unknown (amateur format)	17.5 mm	1.60	0.630" × 0.394"	1 perf, center	spherical	17.5 mm			spherical
Prestwich 13 mm	John Alfred Prestwich	1899	unknown (amateur format)	13 mm				spherical	13 mm			spherical
Mirograph	Reulos, Goudeau & Co	1900	unknown (amateur format)	21 mm			1 notch, 2 sides	spherical	21 mm			spherical
Lumiere Wide	Lumière Brothers	1900		75 mm	1.33	2.362" × 1.772"	8 perf, 2 sides	spherical	75 mm	1.33		spherical
Cinéorama	R. Grimoin-Sanson	1900	Cinéorama	70 mm × 10 cameras (360°)			4 perf?	spherical	70 mm × 10 projectors (360°)			spherical
La Petite (Hughes)	W.C. Hughes	1900	unknown (amateur format)	17.5 mm	1.60	0.630" × 0.394"	1 perf, center (smaller and less rectangular than Biokam)	spherical	17.5 mm			spherical
Pocket Chrono	Gaumont Demeny	1900	unknown (amateur format)	15 mm			1 perf, center	spherical	15 mm			spherical
Vitak	William Wardell	1902	unknown (amateur format)	no standard	no standard	no standard	1 perf, center	spherical	11 mm			spherical
Home Kinetoscope	Edison	1912	unknown (amateur format)	no standard	no standard	no standard	no standard	spherical	22 mm, 2 perf (on frameline between frame rows)	1.5	0.236" × 0.157" (three frames across width)	spherical
Pathe Kok	Pathé	1912	unknown (amateur format)	28 mm	1.36	0.748" × 0.551"	3 perf on one side, 1 perf on the other	spherical	28 mm			spherical
Duoscope	Alexander F. Victor	1912	unknown (amateur format)	17.5 mm			2 perfs, center	spherical	17.5 mm			spherical
Panoramico	Filoteo Alberini	1914	Il sacco di Roma	70 mm	2.52		5 perf, 2 sides	spherical	70 mm			spherical
Split Duplex	Duplex Corporation	1915		35 mm	1.33	0.980" × 0.735"	4 perf, 2 sides (shooting)	spherical	35 mm	1.87	0.735" × 0.394"	spherical (split image 90° rotated)
11 mm	(American)	1916	unknown (amateur format)	11 mm			1 perf, center	spherical	11 mm			spherical
Movette	Movette Camera Company	1917	unknown (amateur format)	17.5 mm			2 perfs, 2 sides (rounded)	spherical	17.5 mm			spherical
28 mm safety standard	Alexander F. Victor	1918	unknown (amateur format)	28 mm	1.36	0.748" × 0.551"	3 perf, 2 sides	spherical	28 mm			spherical
Clou	(Austrian)	1920	unknown (amateur format)	17.5 mm			2 perf, 2 sides	spherical	17.5 mm			spherical
26 mm	(French)	1920	unknown (amateur format)	26 mm			1 perf, 1 side	spherical	26 mm			spherical
9.5 mm	Pathé	1922	unknown (amateur format)	9.5 mm	1.31	0.335" × 0.256"	1 perf, center	spherical	9.5 mm	1.31	0.315" × 0.242"	spherical
Phonofilm	Lee De Forest	1922	Barking Dog and Flying Jenny Airplane	35 mm	1.33	0.980" × 0.735"	4 perf, 2 sides	spherical	35 mm	1.17	0.826" × 0.708"	spherical
Widescope	John D. Elms & George W. Bingham	1922		35 mm × 2 (both in same camera)	1.33 × 2 negatives	0.980" × 0.735"	4 perf, 2 sides	spherical (one lens per strip)	35 mm × 2 projectors	2.66	0.931" × 0.698"	spherical
Cinebloc	Ozaphan	1922	unknown (amateur format)	22 mm			2 perf, 2 sides	spherical	22 mm			spherical
Tri-Ergon soundfilm	Tri-Ergon	1922		35 mm	1.33	0.980" × 0.735"	4 perf, 2 sides	spherical	42 mm	1.33	0.931" × 0.698"	spherical
16 mm	Eastman Kodak	1923	unknown (amateur format)	16 mm	1.37	0.404" × 0.295"	1 perf, 1 or 2 sides	spherical	16 mm	1.37	0.378" × 0.276"	spherical
Duplex	G.J. Bradley	1923	unknown (amateur format)	11 mm			2 perf, 2 sides (rounded)	spherical	11.5 mm			spherical
Alberini-Hill	Corrado Cerqua	1924		35 mm	1.66	1.575" × 0.945" (curved)	10 perf, 2 sides, horizontal	spherical, on 65° revolving drum	35 mm			spherical
Cinelux	Ozaphan	1924	unknown (amateur format)	24 mm				spherical	24 mm			spherical
48 mm	J.H. Powrie	1924		48 mm	1.32	1.969" × 1.496"	horizontal	spherical	35 mm	1.33	0.931" × 0.698"	spherical
Natural Vision	George K. Spoor & P. John Berggren	1925	Niagara Falls and Rollercoaster Ride	63.5 mm	1.84	2.060" × 1.120"	6 perf, 2 sides, 20 frame/s	spherical	63.5 mm	2.00		spherical
13 mm	(French)	1925	unknown (amateur format)	13 mm			4 perf, center	spherical	13 mm			spherical
18 mm	(Russian)	1925	unknown (amateur format)	18 mm			1 perf, 2 sides	spherical	18 mm			spherical
Pathe Rural	Pathé	1926	unknown (amateur format)	17.5 mm	1.35 (silent); 1.30 (sound)	0.516" × 0.382" (silent); 0.445" × 0.343" (sound)	1 perf, 2 sides	spherical	17.5 mm	1.33 (silent); 1.26 (sound)	0.472" × 0.354" (silent); 0.445" × 0.343" (sound)	spherical
Widevision	John D. Elms & George W. Bingham	1926	Natural Vision Pictures	57 mm			5 perf, 2 sides	spherical	57 mm			spherical
Magnascope	Lorenzo del Riccio	1926	Old Ironsides	35 mm	1.33	0.980" × 0.735"	4 perf, 2 sides	spherical	35 mm	1.33	0.931" × 0.698"	spherical (selected scenes projected using a wider lens for larger picture)
Fox Movietone	F. H. Owens, T. Case, Tri-Ergon	1927	Sunrise: A Song of Two Humans	35 mm	1.33	0.980" × 0.735"	4 perf, 2 sides	spherical	35 mm	1.17	0.826" × 0.708"	spherical
Polyvision	Abel Gance	1927	Napoléon	35 mm × 3 cameras	1.33 × 3 negatives	0.980" × 0.735"	4 perf, 2 sides	spherical	35 mm × 3 projectors	4.00	0.931" × 0.698"	spherical
Hypergonar	Henri Chrétien	1927	Pour construire un feu	35 mm	2.66	0.980" × 0.735"	4 perf, 2 sides	2× anamorphic	35 mm	2.66	0.931" × 0.698"	2× anamorphic
Magnafilm	Lorenzo del Riccio	1929	You're in the Army Now	56 mm	2.19	1.620" × 0.740"	4 perf, 2 sides	spherical	56 mm	2.00		spherical
Fox Grandeur	Fox Film Corporation	1929	Fox Grandeur News and Fox Movietone Follies of 1929	70 mm	2.07	1.890" × 0.913"	4 perf, 2 sides, 20 frame/s (before 1930)	spherical	70 mm	2.00	1.768" × 0.885"	spherical
Fearless Super Pictures	Ralph G. Fear	1929		35 mm	2.27	1.813" × 0.800"	10 perfs, 2 sides, horizontal	spherical	35 mm, horizontal			spherical
Fearless Super-Film / Magnifilm / Fox Vitascope	Ralph G. Fear	1930	Song of the Flame	65 mm	2.00	1.811" × 0.906"	5 perf, 2 sides	spherical	65 mm	2.05	1.772" × 0.866"	spherical
Realife	MGM	1930	Billy the Kid	70 mm	2.07	1.890" × 0.913"	4 perf, 2 sides	spherical	35 mm	1.75	0.904" × 0.517"	spherical
50 mm	Fox Film Corporation & SMPE	1930		50 mm	1.80	1.325" × 0.735"		spherical	50 mm	1.80	1.305" × 0.725"	spherical
17 mm sound	(French)	1930	unknown (amateur format)	17 mm			1 perf, 1 side	spherical	17 mm			spherical
Giant Expanding Pictures	George Palmer	1930		35 mm	1.33	0.980" × 0.735"	4 perf, 2 sides	spherical	35 mm	1.17	0.826" × 0.708"	spherical (with a special projection zoom lens zooming wider and opening masking for key sequences)
Kodel Kemco Homovie	Clarence Ogden	1931	unknown (amateur format)	16 mm		4 sequential images per frame	1 perf, 2 sides	spherical	16 mm			spherical
Academy format	AMPAS	1932		35 mm	1.375 (commonly abbreviated to 1.37)	0.868″ × 0.631″	4 perf, 2 sides	spherical	35 mm	1.37	0.825″ × 0.600″	spherical
8 mm	Eastman Kodak	1932	unknown (amateur format)	16 mm	1.32	0.192" × 0.145"	1 perf, 1 side (using 16 mm film with twice as many perfs)	spherical	8 mm	1.33	0.172" × 0.129"	spherical
Straight 8	Bell & Howell	1935	unknown (amateur format)	8 mm	1.32	0.192" × 0.145"	1 perf, 1 side	spherical	8 mm	1.33	0.172" × 0.129"	spherical
Vitarama	Fred Waller	1939		16 mm × 11 cameras	1.37 × 11 negatives	0.404" × 0.295"	1 perf, 2 sides	spherical	16 mm × 11 projectors	hemispherical view	0.378" × 0.276"	spherical
Waller Flexible Gunnery Trainer	Fred Waller	1943	US Air Force interactive training exercise	35 mm × 5 cameras	1.37 × 5 negatives	0.866" × 0.630"	4 perf, 2 sides	spherical	35 mm × 5 projectors	hemispherical view	0.825" × 0.602"	spherical
Cinerama	Fred Waller	1952	This Is Cinerama	35 mm × 3 cameras	2.59 (3 × negatives)	0.996" × 1.116"	6 perf, 2 sides at 26 frame/s	spherical	35 mm × 3 projectors, with 6 perf pulldown	2.59, with 146° curved screen	0.985" × 1.088"	spherical
Matted 1.66	Paramount	1953	Shane	35 mm	1.37	0.866" × 0.630"	4 perf, 2 sides	spherical	35 mm	1.66	0.825" × 0.497"	spherical
Matted 1.85	Universal	1953	Thunder Bay	35 mm	1.37	0.866" × 0.630"	4 perf, 2 sides	spherical	35 mm	1.85	0.825" × 0.446"	spherical
Matted 1.75	MGM	1953	Arena	35 mm	1.37	0.866" × 0.630"	4 perf, 2 sides	spherical	35 mm	1.75	0.825" × 0.471"	spherical
Cinemascope	20th Century Fox	1953	The Robe	35 mm	2.55 (1953–57); 2.35 (1957–67)	0.937" × 0.735" (1953–57); 0.868" × 0.735" (1957–67)	4 perf, 2 sides	2× anamorphic	35 mm	2.55 (1953–57); 2.35 (1957–67)	0.912" × 0.715" (1953–57); 0.839" × 0.715" (1957–67)	2× anamorphic
Arnoldscope	John Arnold	1953		35 mm			10 perf, 2 sides, horizontal	spherical				
VistaVision	Paramount	1954	White Christmas	35 mm	1.51	1.495" × 0.991"	8 perf, 2 sides, horizontal	spherical	35 mm, 4 perf, vertical	1.85	0.825" × 0.446"	spherical
VistaVision Large Area	Paramount	1954	White Christmas	35 mm	1.51	1.495" × 0.991"	8 perf, 2 sides, horizontal	spherical	35 mm, 8 perf, horizontal	1.96	1.418" × 0.723"	spherical
Superscope	Tushinsky Brothers	1954	Vera Cruz	35 mm	1.33	0.980" × 0.735"	4 perf, 2 sides	spherical	35 mm	2.00	0.715" × 0.715"	2× anamorphic
Circarama	Disney	1955	A Tour of the West	16 mm × 11 cameras	1.37 × 11 negatives	0.404" × 0.295"	1 perf, 2 sides	spherical	16 mm × 11 projectors	360°	0.378" × 0.276"	spherical
Todd-AO	Michael Todd	1955	Oklahoma	65 mm	2.29	2.072" × 0.906"	5 perfs, 2 sides, at 30 frame/s	spherical	70 mm	2.21, with 120° curved screen	1.912" × 0.870"	spherical
CinemaScope 55	20th Century Fox	1955	Carousel	55 mm	2.55	1.824" × 1.430"	8 perfs, 2 sides	2× anamorphic	35 mm	2.55	0.912" × 0.715"	2× anamorphic
9.5 Duplex	Pathé Fréres	1955	?	9.5 mm	1.51	4.1 mm × 6.2 mm	2 central perforations in a 9.5mm film	spherical	4.75 mm			spherical, rotated 90°
8 mm Panoramic	Dimaphot, Paris	1955	?	16 mm	1.5	5 mm × 7.5 mm	1 perf, 2 sides	spherical	8 mm			spherical, rotated 90°
Emel Panoscope	Emel, Paris	1955	?	16 mm	2.7	3.5 mm × 9.6 mm	2 perf, 2 sides	spherical	16 mm			spherical
Technirama	Technicolor	1956	The Monte Carlo Story	35 mm	2.26	1.496" × 0.992"	8 perf, 2 sides, horizontally	1.5× anamorphic	35 mm, 4 perf vertical	2.35	0.839" × 0.715"	2× anamorphic
Technirama Large Area	Technicolor	1956	The Monte Carlo Story	35 mm	2.26	1.496" × 0.992"	8 perf, 2 sides, horizontally	1.5× anamorphic	35 mm, 8 perf horizontal	2.42	1.421" × 0.881"	1.5× anamorphic
Dynamic Frame	Glenn Alvey	1956	The Door in the Wall	35 mm	1.3, 1.6, and 2.5	variable aperture plates	8 perf, 2 sides, horizontally	spherical	35 mm, 4 perf, vertical	1.3, 1.5, and 2.5		spherical
Superscope 235	Superscope Inc.	1956	Run for the Sun	35 mm	1.33	0.980" × 0.735"	4 perf, 2 sides	spherical	35 mm	2.35	0.839" × 0.715"	2× anamorphic
Thrillarama	Albert H. Reynolds	1956	Thrillarama Adventure	35 mm × 2 cameras	1.78 × 2 negatives		3 perf, 2 sides?	spherical	35 mm × 2 projectors	3.55, with a curved screen		spherical
Magirama	Abel Gance	1956	Magirama	35 mm × 3 cameras (sides bounced off mirrors)	1.33 × 3 negatives	0.980" × 0.735"	4 perf, 2 sides	spherical	35 mm × 3 projectors (sides bounced off mirrors)	4.00	0.931" × 0.698"	spherical
MGM Camera 65	Panavision	1957	Raintree County	65 mm	2.76	2.072" × 0.906"	5 perf, 2 sides	1.25× anamorphic	70 mm	2.76	1.912" × 0.870"	1.25× anamorphic
Ultra Panavision	Panavision	1962	Ben-Hur	65 mm	2.76	2.072" × 0.906"	5 perf, 2 sides	1.25× anamorphic	70 mm	2.76	1.912" × 0.870"	1.25× anamorphic
Cinestage	Mike Todd	1957	Around the World in 80 Days	65 mm	2.29	2.072" × 0.906"	5 perfs, 2 sides	spherical	35 mm (1 mm shaved off for UK prints)	2.12	0.912" × 0.675"	1.567× anamorphic
Rank VistaVision	J. Arthur Rank Organization	1957		35 mm	1.51	1.495" × 0.991"	8 perf, 2 sides, horizontally	spherical	35 mm, 4 perf, vertical	1.82	0.825" × 0.602"	1.33× anamorphic
Modern anamorphic	Panavision	1958	The Female Animal	35 mm	2.37	0.866" × 0.732"	4 perf, 2 sides	2× anamorphic	35 mm	2.35 (1957–70); 2.39 (1970–present)	0.839" × 0.715" (1957–70); 0.838" × 0.7" (1970–93); 0.825" × 0.690" (1993–present)	2× anamorphic
Kinopanorama	NIKFI	1958	Great Is My Country	35 mm × 3 cameras	0.91 × 3 negatives	1.014" × 1.116"	6 perf, 2 sides, at 25 frame/s	spherical	35 mm × 3 projectors	2.72	0.985" × 1.088"	spherical
70 mm	American Optical Company	1958	South Pacific	65 mm	2.28	2.066" × 0.906"	5 perfs, 2 sides	spherical	70 mm	2.21	1.912" × 0.87"	spherical
Cinemiracle	National Theatres	1958	Windjammer	35 mm × 3 cameras (sides bounced off mirrors)	0.89 × 3 negatives	0.996" × 1.116"	6 perf, 2 sides at 26 frame/s	spherical	35 mm × 3 projectors (sides bounced off mirrors), with 6 perf pulldown	2.59, with 120° curved screen	0.985" × 1.088"	spherical
Super Technirama	Technicolor	1959	Sleeping Beauty	35 mm	2.26	1.496" × 0.992"	8 perf, 2 sides, horizontally	1.5× anamorphic	70 mm	2.21	1.912" × 0.816"	spherical
Smith-Carney System	Rowe E. Carney Jr. and Tom F. Smith	1959	Missouri travelogue	35 mm	4.69	0.839" × 0.370" (bottom half) and 0.449" × 0.370" (top quarters)	4 perf, 2 sides	spherical × 3	35 mm	4.69	three sub-frames projected to one 180° image	spherical × 3
Circular Kinopanorama / Circlorama	E. Goldovsky	1959	The Path of Spring	35 mm × 11 cameras	1.37 × 11 negatives	0.866" × 0.630"	4 perf, 2 sides	spherical	35 mm × 11 projectors	360°	0.825" × 0.602"	spherical
Varioscope	Jan Jacobsen	1959	Flying Clipper	65 mm	2.28	2.066" × 0.906"	5 perfs, 2 sides	spherical	70 mm	variable framing run through control signal	1.912" × 0.87"	spherical
Quadravision	Ford Motor Company	1959	Design for Suburban Living showtent	? mm × 4 cameras	? × 4 negatives			spherical	? mm × 4 projectors	? (4 images in 2×2 configuration)		spherical
Techniscope	Technicolor	1960	The Pharaoh's Woman	35 mm	2.33	0.868" × 0.373"	2 perf, 2 sides	spherical	35 mm	2.39	0.838" × 0.7"	2× anamorphic
Wonderama (Arc 120)	Leon W. Wells	1960	Honeymoon	no standard	no standard	no standard	no standard	no standard	35 mm	2.50 with a 120° curved screen	0.931" × 0.698", with two half-images turned 90° and placed side-by-side	spherical × 2
Cine System 3	Eric Berndt	1960	USAF and NASA usage	3 mm			1 perf, centered	spherical				
Grandeur 70	20th Century Fox	1961	The King and I (re-release)	55 mm	2.55	1.824" × 1.430"	8 perfs, 2 sides	2× anamorphic	70 mm	2.21	1.912" × 0.87"	spherical
Cinerama 360	Cinerama Corporation	1962	Journey to the Stars	65 mm	1.00 (circle)	2.25" diameter circular image	10 perf, 2 sides	fisheye	70 mm	1.00 (circle)	2.25" diameter circular image	spherical
Super 8	Eastman Kodak	1965	unknown (amateur format)	8 mm	1.48	0.245" × 0.166"	1 perf, 1 side	spherical	8 mm	1.36	0.215" × 0.158"	spherical
Real Sound	Kenner	1965		no standard	no standard	no standard	1 perf, 1 side	spherical	11.5 mm	1.33	0.172" × 0.129"	spherical
Double Super 8	Eastman Kodak	1965	unknown (amateur format)	16 mm	1.48	0.245" × 0.166"	1 perf, 1 side (using 16 mm film with twice as many perfs)	spherical	8 mm	1.36	0.215" × 0.158"	spherical
Single-8	Fujifilm	1966	unknown (amateur format)	8 mm	1.36	0.224" × 0.164"	1 perf, 1 side	spherical	8 mm	1.35	0.213" × 0.157"	spherical
Dimension 150	American Optical Company	1966	The Bible: In the Beginning	65 mm	2.28	2.066" × 0.906"	5 perfs, 2 sides	spherical	70 mm	2.21, with 150° curved screen	1.912" × 0.87", optically curved to compensate for the screen	spherical
Circle Vision 360	Disney	1967	America the Beautiful	35 mm × 9 cameras	1.37 × 9 negatives	0.866" × 0.630"	4 perf, 2 sides	spherical	35 mm × 9 projectors	360°	0.825" × 0.602"	spherical
8.75 mm	Shanghai Film Projection Equipment Factory	1968	unknown (amateur format)				1 perf	spherical	8.75 mm			spherical
Astrovision	Goto Optical	1969		65 mm			10 perf, 2 sides	spherical or fish-eye	70 mm			fish-eye (dome projection)
IMAX	IMAX Corporation	1970	Tiger Child	65 mm	1.34	2.772" × 2.072"	15 perf, 2 sides, horizontally	spherical	70 mm, horizontal	1.31	2.692" × 2.056"	spherical
Super 16 mm film	Rune Ericson	1970	Blushing Charlie	16 mm	1.66	0.493" × 0.292"	1 perf, 1 side	spherical	no standard, but often blown up to 35 mm	no standard	0.463" × 0.279" (full frame); 0.463" × 0.251" (framed for 1.85)	spherical
Pik-a-Movie	Leon W. Wells	1972		no standard	no standard	no standard	no standard	no standard	70 mm, horizontal, 1 perf, 2 sides	1.48	0.245" × 0.166", 12 rows high, underneath 12 rows of optical sound	spherical
OMNIMAX	IMAX Corporation	1973	Garden Isle	65 mm	1.34	2.772" × 2.072"	15 perf, 2 sides, horizontally	special fish-eye lenses optically centered 0.37" above film horizontal center line	70 mm, horizontal	1.31	2.692" × 2.056"	spherical, projected elliptically on a dome screen, 20 degrees below and 110 degrees above perfectly centered viewers
8/70 (Dynavision, Iwerks 870)	Dynavision	1973?		65 mm	1.37	2.031" × 1.484"	8 perf, 2 sides, 24 or 30 frame/s	spherical	70 mm	1.34	1.913" × 1.431"	spherical
Showscan	Douglas Trumbull	1978	Night of Dreams	65 mm	2.28	2.066" × 0.906"	5 perfs, 2 sides, at 60 frame/s	spherical	70 mm, at 60 frame/s	2.21	1.912" × 0.87"	spherical
Polavision	Polaroid Corporation	1978	unknown (amateur format)	8 mm	1.48	0.245" × 0.166"	1 perf, 1 side	spherical	8 mm	1.36	0.215" × 0.158"	spherical
Cinema 180	Omni Films	1979	Crazy Wheels	65 mm	2.28	2.066" × 0.906"	5 perfs, 2 sides, 30 frame/s	fisheye	70 mm	180°, on a dome	1.912" × 0.87"	fisheye
Super 35	Joe Dunton	1982	Dance Craze	35 mm	1.33	0.980" × 0.735"	4 perf, 2 sides	spherical	35 mm	no standard	no standard	no standard
Circle Vision 200	Disney	1982	Impressions de France	35 mm × 5 cameras	1.37 × 5 negatives	0.866" × 0.630"	4 perf, 2 sides	spherical	35 mm × 5 projectors	6.85, on a 200° screen	0.825" × 0.602"	spherical
Swissorama 360 / Imagine 360	Ernst A. Heiniger	1984	Impressions of Switzerland	65 mm	360°	1.91" (outer edge), 1.20" (inner edge)	10 perf, 2 sides	360° × 35° extreme fisheye	70 mm	360°		360° × 35° extreme fisheye
Super Duper 8 / Max 8 / Super 8B	Mitch Perkins & Greg Miller	mid- 1980s	Sleep Always (2002)	8 mm	1.51	0.250" × 0.166"	1 perf, 1 side	spherical	8 mm	no standard	no standard	spherical
3-perf	Rune Ericson	1987	Pirates of the Lake	35 mm	1.79	0.980" × 0.546"	3 perf, 2 sides	spherical	35 mm	no standard	no standard	no standard
Super VistaVision	Paramount	1989	The Ten Commandments (re-release)	35 mm	1.51	1.495" × 0.991"	8 perf, 2 sides, horizontal	spherical	70 mm	2.21	1.912" × 0.87"	spherical
Kinoton HDFS	Kinoton	1990		no standard	no standard	no standard	no standard	no standard	35 mm	2.00	0.931" × 0.698"	1.5× anamorphic
IMAX Magic Carpet	IMAX Corporation	1990	Flowers in the Sky	65 mm × 2 cameras	1.34	2.772" × 2.072"	15 perf, 2 sides, horizontally	spherical	70 mm, horizontal × 2 projectors	1.31 × 2 screens (one in front, one below)	2.692" × 2.056"	spherical
Iwerksphere	Iwerks	1991		65 mm	1.37	2.031" × 1.484"	8 perf, 2 sides, 24 or 30 frame/s	fisheye	70 mm	1.34	1.913" × 1.431"	fisheye
IMAX HD	IMAX Corporation	1992	Momentum	65 mm	1.34	2.772" × 2.072"	15 perf, 2 sides, horizontally, 48 frame/s	spherical	70 mm, horizontal	1.31	2.692" × 2.056"	spherical
Hexiplex	(Australian)	1992	Expo '92 demo	35 mm × 6 cameras	1.37 × 6 negatives	0.866" × 0.630"	4 perf, 2 sides	spherical	35 mm × 6 projectors	360°, with rotating screens and projectors	0.825" × 0.602"	spherical
Ultra Toruscope	Mac McCarney	1992		35 mm × 3 cameras	1.37 × 3 negatives	0.866" × 0.630"	4 perf, 2 sides, at 30 frame/s	spherical	70 mm × 3 projectors, at 30 frame/s	360°	1.912" × 0.87"	spherical
Imagination FX 7012	Geo-Odyssey	1992?		35 mm	2.08	2.040" × 0.980"	12 perf, 2 sides, horizontal	spherical	70 mm	2.21	1.912" × 0.87"	spherical
Univisium	Vittorio Storaro	1998	Tango	35 mm	2.00	0.945" × 0.472"	3 perf, 2 sides at 25 frame/s	spherical	35 mm	2.00		spherical
Maxivision	Dean Goodhill	1999		35 mm	1.79	0.980" × 0.546"	3 perf, 2 sides	spherical	35 mm, 3 perf	1.85		spherical
Maxivision 48	Dean Goodhill	1999		35 mm	1.79	0.980" × 0.546"	3 perf, 2 sides, 48 frame/s	spherical	35 mm, 3 perf, 48 frame/s	1.85		spherical
Super Dimension 70	Robert Weisgerber	1999		65 mm	2.28	2.066" × 0.906"	5 perfs, 2 sides, at 48 frame/s	spherical	70 mm, at 48 frame/s	2.21	1.912" × 0.87"	spherical
FuturVision 360				65 mm	1.52	2.066" × 0.906"	5 perfs, 2 sides, 30 frame/s	1.5× vertical anamorphic	70 mm	1.47	1.912" × 0.87"	1.5× vertical anamorphic
Mini-Max	Vistascope			35 mm	2.66		2 perf, 2 sides, 30 frame/s	spherical	35 mm	2.66		spherical
MotionMaster	Omni Films			65 mm	2.28	2.066" × 0.906"	5 perfs, 2 sides, 30 frame/s	spherical	70 mm	2.21, on a curved screen	1.912" × 0.87"	spherical
Row-film	R. Thun			35 mm		20 rows of images wide		spherical				spherical
Septorama				? mm × 7 cameras	1.33 × 7 negatives			spherical	? mm × 7 projectors	hemispherical view		spherical
Single Cinerama	Fred Waller			35 mm		curved gate	16 perf, 2 sides, horizontal	spherical	35 mm, horizontal	curved screen		spherical
Soviet 10				65 mm			10 perf, 2 sides	2× anamorphic	70 mm	2.09	1.890" × 1.811"	2× anamorphic
Vario-35				35 mm				spherical	35 mm	variable framing run through control signal	0.835" × 0.713" (full); 0.835" × 0.453" (1.84); 0.709" × 0.524" (1.35); 0.614" × 0.614" (1.00); 0.535" × 0.713" (0.75)	spherical
Vario-35A				35 mm					35 mm	variable framing run through control signal	0.835" × 0.713"	variable anamorphic (2× for 2.35; 1.57× for 1.85; 1.17× for 1.37; 0.85× for 1.00; 0.64× for 0.75; 0.5× for 0.59)
Vario-70				65 mm			10 perfs, 2 sides	spherical	70 mm	variable framing run through control signal	1.890" × 1.811" (full); 1.890" × 0.803" (2.35); 1.673" × 0.906" (1.85); 1.441" × 1.051" (1.37); 1.232" × 1.232" (1.00); 1.063" × 1.429" (0.74); 0.945" × 1.604" (0.59); 0.839" × 1.811" (0.46)	spherical
Format	Creator	Est.	First known work	Negative gauge	Negative A/R	Gate dims	Negative pulldown	Negative lenses	Projection gauge	Projection A/R	Projection dims	Projection lenses

== Size comparison between various film formats ==
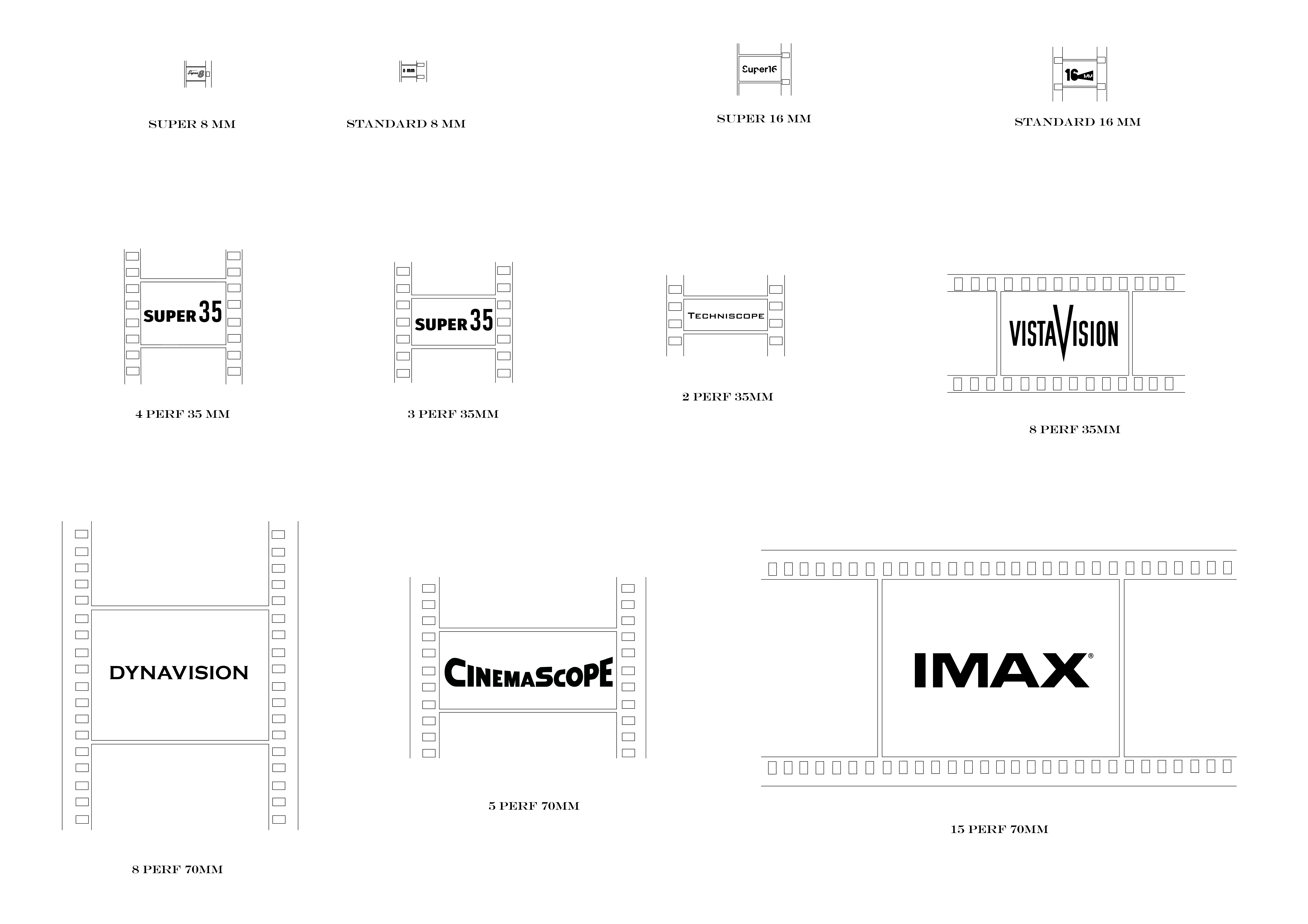
Size comparison between various film formats

This image is a visual comparison of various motion picture film formats, showcasing different frame sizes and perforation (perf) counts across gauges like 8mm, 16mm, 35mm, and 70mm.

=== Summary comparison between film formats ===
Format	Gauge	Orientation	Perforation count	Aspect ratio (approx.)	Notable for
Standard 8	8mm	Vertical	1	1.33:1	Early amateur use
Super 8	8mm	Vertical	1	1.33:1	Home movies, nostalgia
Standard 16	16mm	Vertical	1	1.33:1	Docs, newsreels
Super 16	16mm	Vertical	1	1.66:1 – 1.85:1	Indie film, TV
2-Perf 35mm	35mm	Vertical	2	2.39:1	Techniscope, budget
3-Perf 35mm	35mm	Vertical	3	1.85:1	Efficient widescreen
4-Perf 35mm	35mm	Vertical	4	1.37:1 (flat) / 2.39:1 (anamorphic)	Industry standard
VistaVision	35mm	Horizontal	8	1.50:1 (cropped to 1.85:1)	High-res, VFX
5-Perf 70mm	70mm	Vertical	5	2.20:1	Epic cinema
Dynavision	70mm	Vertical	8	1.39:1	Rare large-frame format
IMAX	70mm	Horizontal	15	1.43:1	Ultra-large format

== See also ==
- List of anamorphic format trade names
- Color motion picture film
- List of film sound systems
- Display resolution
- Display aspect ratio
- List of photographic film formats
