= Krugovaya Kinopanorama =

Cinema in Moscow, Russia

Coordinates: 55°49′38″N 37°37′48″E

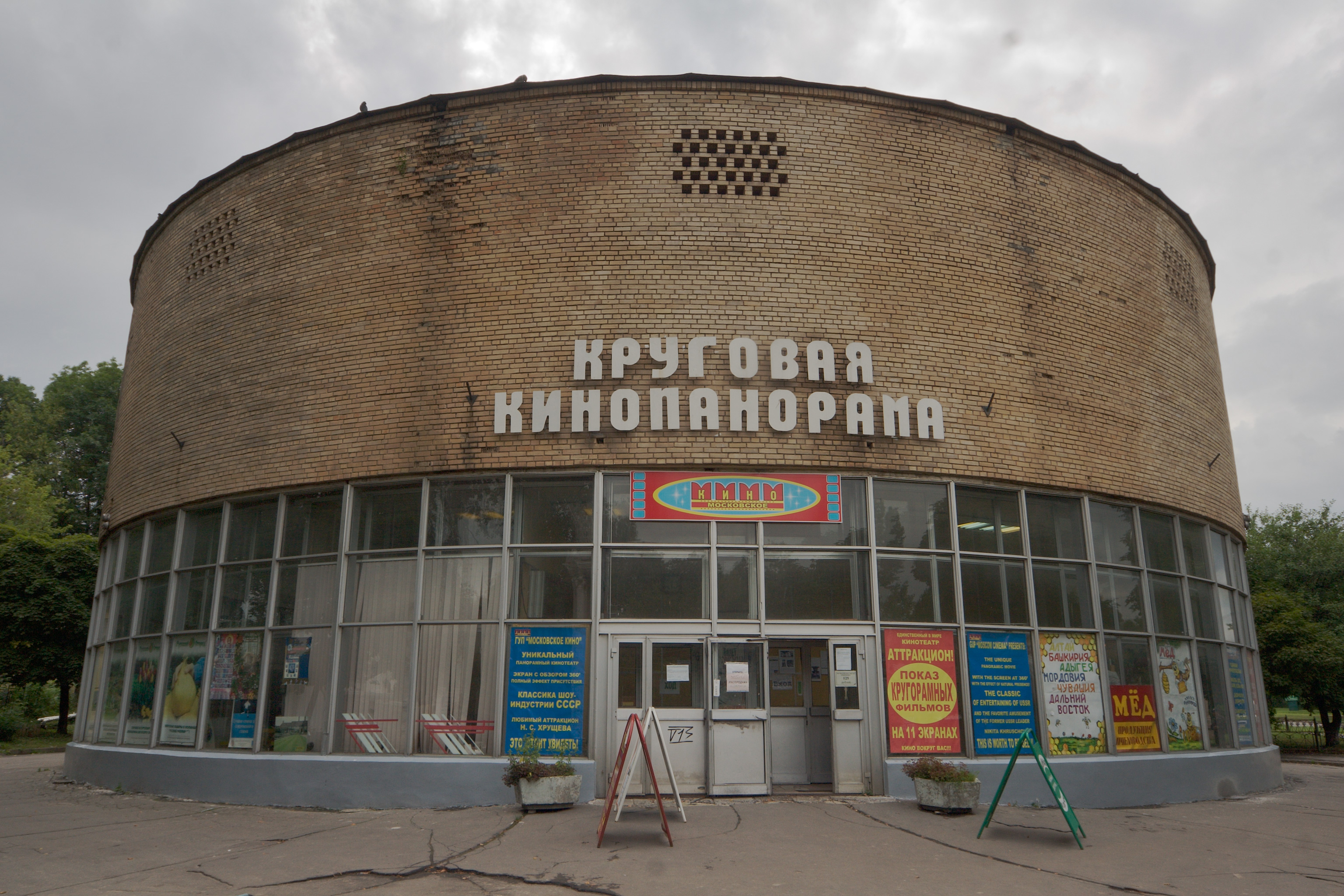
The entrance to the circular building of the Krugovaya Kinopanorama on the grounds of the All-Russia Exhibition Centre.

The Krugovaya Kinopanorama or Circular Kinopanorama (Russian: Круговая кинопанорама) is a cinema in Moscow of Russia which plays Krugorama, a type of cinema presentation in which film is projected on a circular screen with a horizontal 360° view. This was pioneered in 1896 by French engineer Raoul Grimoin-Sanson, who played ten projectors simultaneously on a circular screen, a process he called Cinéorama. Cinerama though spelled similarly has a different meaning, and denotes three projectors on an arched screen, as does Kinopanorama. The technology used in the Moscow Circular Kinopanorama was also previously carried out by Walt Disney in 1955, in a process he called Circarama (later known as Circle-Vision 360° from 1967 onward).

== Moscow Circular Kinopanorama ==
On the site of the All-Russia Exhibition Centre in Moscow is a working example of the Circular Kinopanorama technology which bears the name Krygovaya Kinopanorama.

Special systems of movie-cameras were needed for the exposure of this theatre's films. In the pursuit of these a number of complex technical problems were solved. For example, in 1959 the designers of the Yakovlev design bureau managed to develop a suspension device for shooting circular kinopanoramic films from a Yak-24 helicopter. Developing these cameras simultaneously solved the task of carriage of goods with minimal transfer of vibration.

Since 2006, after more than a ten-year recess, the Krygovaya Kinopanorama is again opened to audiences.
