= Movie projector =

Device for showing motion picture film

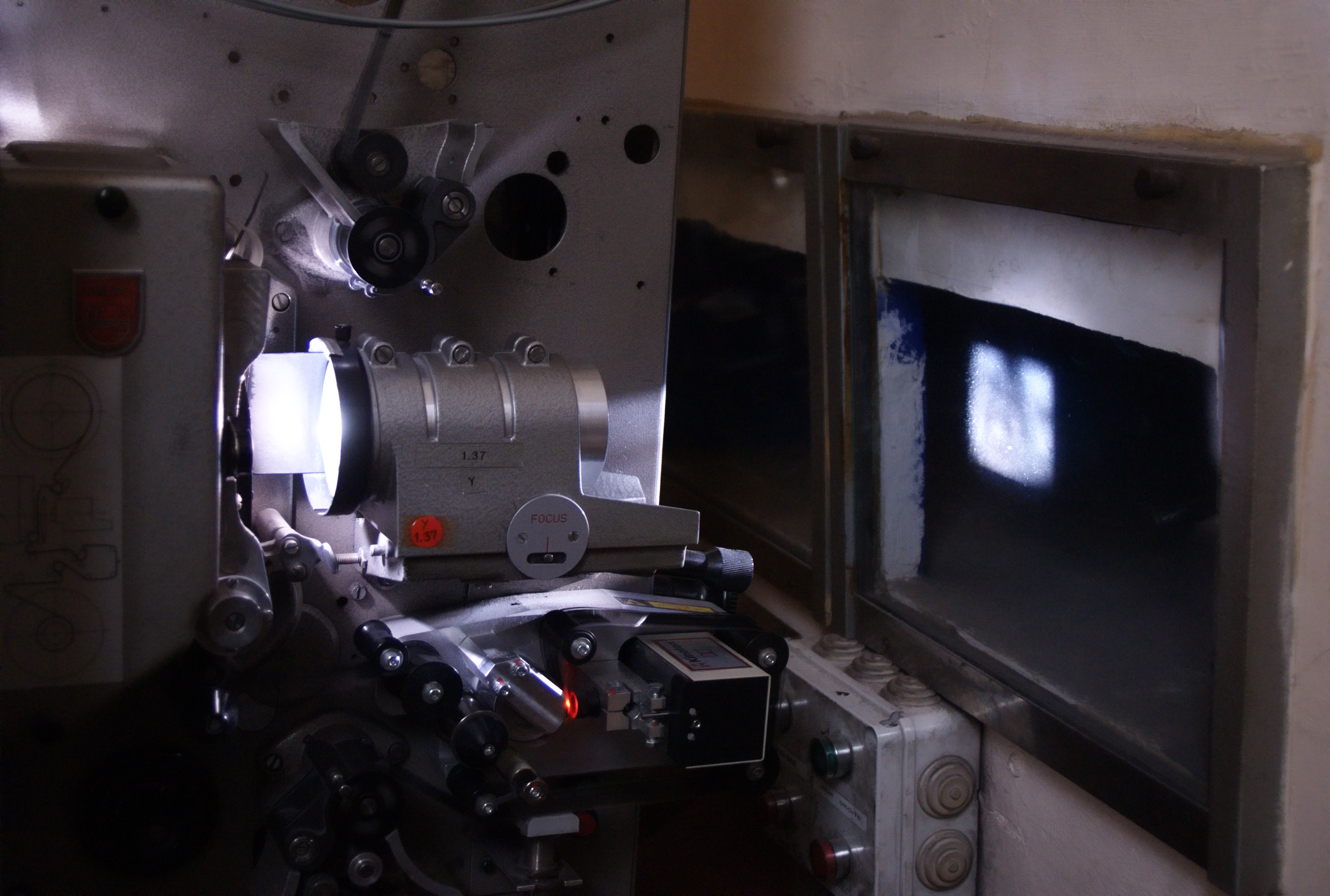
35 mm movie projector in operation

Bill Hammack explains how a film projector works.

A movie projector (or film projector) is an opto-mechanical device for displaying motion picture film by projecting it onto a screen. Most of the optical and mechanical elements, except for the illumination and sound devices, are present in movie cameras. Modern movie projectors are specially built video projectors (see also digital cinema).

Many projectors are specific to a particular film gauge and not all movie projectors are film projectors since the use of film is required.

== Predecessors ==
Simulation of a spinning zoopraxiscope

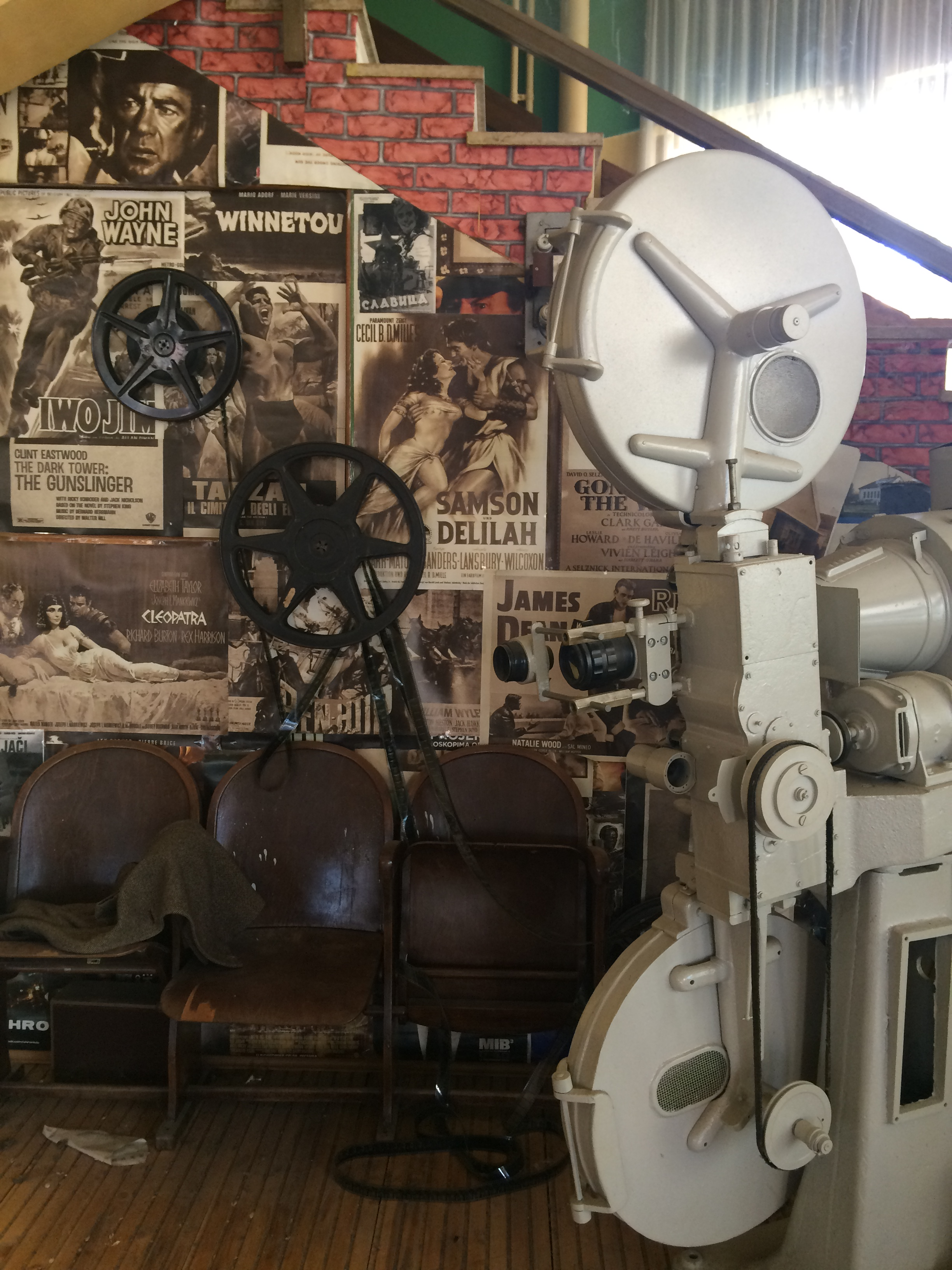
An early projector and seats from a movie theater

The main precursor to the movie projector was the magic lantern. In its most common setup it had a concave mirror behind a light source to help direct as much light as possible through a painted glass picture slide and a lens, out of the lantern onto a screen. Simple mechanics to have the painted images moving were probably implemented since Christiaan Huygens introduced the apparatus around 1659. Initially, candles and oil lamps were used, but other light sources, such as the argand lamp and limelight were usually adopted soon after their introduction. Magic lantern presentations may often have had relatively small audiences, but the very popular phantasmagoria and dissolving views shows were usually performed in proper theatres, large tents or especially converted spaces with plenty seats.

Both Joseph Plateau and Simon Stampfer thought of lantern projection when they independently introduced stroboscopic animation in 1833 with a stroboscopic disc (which became known as the phenakistiscope), but neither of them intended to work on projection themselves.

The oldest known successful screenings of stroboscopic animation were performed by Ludwig Döbler in 1847 in Vienna and taken on a tour to several large European cities for over a year. His Phantaskop had a front with separate lenses for each of the 12 pictures on a disc and two separate lenses were cranked around to direct light through the pictures.

Wordsworth Donisthorpe patented ideas for a cinematographic film camera and a film presentation system in 1876. In reply to the introduction of the phonograph and a magazine's suggestion that it could be combined with projection of stereoscopic photography, Donisthorpe stated that he could do even better and announced that he would present such images in motion. His original Kinesigraph camera gave unsatisfactory results. He had better results with a new camera in 1889 but never seems to have been successful in projecting his movies.

Eadweard Muybridge developed his Zoopraxiscope in 1879 and gave many lectures with the machine from 1880 to 1894. It projected images from rotating glass disks. The images were initially painted onto the glass, as silhouettes. A second series of discs, made in 1892–94, used outline drawings printed onto the discs photographically, then colored by hand.

Ottomar Anschütz developed his first Electrotachyscope in 1886. For each scene, 24 glass plates with chronophotographic images were attached to the edge of a large rotating wheel and thrown on a small opal-glass screen by very short synchronized flashes from a Geissler tube. He demonstrated his photographic motion from March 1887 until at least January 1890 to circa 4 or 5 people at a time, in Berlin, other large German cities, Brussels (at the 1888 Exposition Universelle), Florence, Saint Petersburg, New York, Boston and Philadelphia. Between 1890 and 1894 he concentrated on the exploitation of an automatic coin-operated version that was an inspiration for Edison Company's Kinetoscope. From 28 November 1894 to at least May 1895 he projected his recordings from two intermittently rotating discs, mostly in 300-seat halls, in several German cities. During circa 5 weeks of screenings at the old Berlin Reichstag in February and March 1895, circa 7.000 paying visitors came to see the show.

In 1886, Louis Le Prince applied for a US patent for a 16-lens device that combined a motion picture camera with a projector. In 1888, he used an updated version of his camera to film the motion picture Roundhay Garden Scene and other scenes. The pictures were privately exhibited in Hunslet. After investing much time, effort and means in a slow and troublesome development of a definitive system, Le Prince eventually seemed satisfied with the result and had a demonstration screening scheduled in New York in 1890. However, he went missing after boarding a train in France and was declared dead in 1897. His widow and son managed to draw attention to Le Prince's work and eventually he came to be regarded as the true inventor of film (a claim also made for many others).

After years of development, Edison eventually introduced the coin-operated peep-box Kinetoscope movie viewer in 1893, mostly in dedicated parlors. He believed this was a commercially much more viable system than projection in theatres. Many other film pioneers found chances to study the technology of the kinetoscope and further developed it for their own movie projection systems.

The Eidoloscope, devised by Eugene Augustin Lauste for the Latham family, was demonstrated for members of the press on 21 April 1895 and opened to the paying public on May 20, in a lower Broadway store with films of the Griffo-Barnett prize boxing fight, taken from Madison Square Garden's roof on 4 May. It was the first commercial projection.

Nicholas Power opened a repair shop for Edison projectors, studied them, and developed one of the earliest and most successful projectors without excessive flicker.

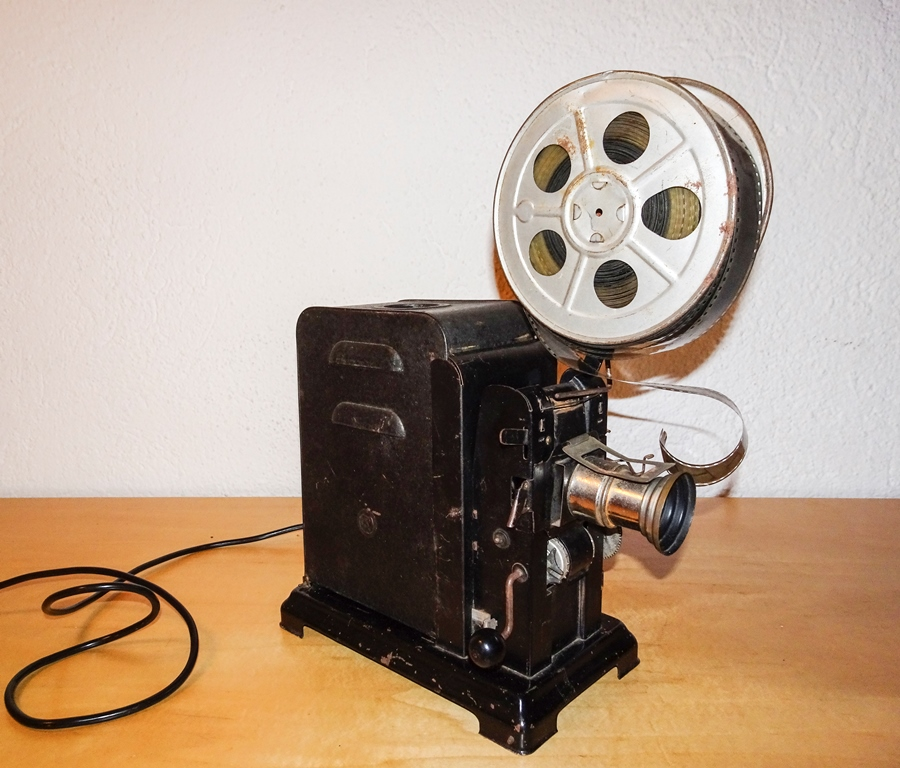
1910s 35mm hand-cranked tinplate toy movie projector manufactured by Leonhard Müller in Nuremberg, Germany

Max and Emil Skladanowsky projected motion pictures with their Bioscop, a flicker-free duplex construction, from 1 to 31 November 1895. They started to tour with their motion pictures, but after catching the second presentation of the Cinématographe Lumière in Paris on 28 December 1895, they seemed to choose not to compete. They still presented their motion pictures in several European cities until March 1897, but eventually the Bioscop had to be retired as a commercial failure.

In Lyon, Louis and Auguste Lumière perfected the Cinématographe, a system that took, printed, and projected film. In late 1895 in Paris, father Antoine Lumière began exhibitions of projected films before the paying public, beginning the general conversion of the medium to projection. They quickly became Europe's main producers with their actualités like Workers Leaving the Lumière Factory and comic vignettes like The Sprinkler Sprinkled (both 1895). Even Edison, joined the trend with the Vitascope, a modified Jenkins' Phantoscope, within less than six months.

In the 1910s, a new consumer commodity was introduced aiming at familial activity, the silent home cinema. Hand-cranked tinplate toy movie projectors, also called vintage projectors, were used taking standard 35 mm 8 perforation silent cinema films.

== Digital projectors ==
In 1999, digital cinema projectors were being tried out in some movie theaters. These early projectors played the movie stored on a computer, and sent to the projector electronically. Due to their relatively low resolution (usually only 2K) compared to later digital cinema systems, the images at the time had visible pixels. By 2006, the advent of much higher 4K resolution digital projection reduced pixel visibility. The systems became more compact over time. By 2009, movie theaters started replacing film projectors with digital projectors. In 2013, it was estimated that 92% of movie theaters in the United States had converted to digital, with 8% still playing film. In 2014, numerous popular filmmakers—including Quentin Tarantino and Christopher Nolan—lobbied large studios to commit to purchase a minimum amount of 35 mm film from Kodak. The decision ensured that Kodak's 35 mm film production would continue for several years.

Although usually more expensive than film projectors, high-resolution digital projectors offer many advantages over traditional film units. For example, digital projectors contain no moving parts except fans, can be operated remotely, are relatively compact and have no film to break, scratch or change reels of. They also allow for much easier, less expensive, and more reliable storage and distribution of content. All-electronic distribution via the internet or satellite eliminates all physical media shipments, although deliveries via physical hard drive are possible. There is also the ability to display live broadcasts in theaters equipped to do so. It is possible to build boothless cinemas where the projector is mounted in a lift within the auditorium and only lowered for servicing, eliminating projection booths and reducing construction and maintenance costs associated with a projection booth.

== Physiology ==
The illusion of motion in projected films is a stroboscopic effect that has conventionally been attributed to persistence of vision and later often to (misinterpretations of) beta movement and the phi phenomenon known from Gestalt psychology. The exact neurological principles are not yet entirely clear, but the retina, nerves and brain create the impression of apparent movement when presented with a rapid sequence of near-identical still images and interruptions that go unnoticed (or are experienced as flicker). A critical part of understanding this visual perception phenomenon is that the eye is not a camera, i.e.: there is no frame rate for the human eye or brain. Instead, the eye-brain system has a combination of motion detectors, detail detectors and pattern detectors, the outputs of all of which are combined to create the visual experience.

The frequency at which flicker becomes invisible is called the flicker fusion threshold, and is dependent on the level of illumination and the condition of the eyes of the viewer. Generally, the frame rate of 16 frames per second (frame/s) is regarded as the lowest frequency at which continuous motion is perceived by humans. This threshold varies across different species; a higher proportion of rod cells in the retina will create a higher threshold level. Because the eye and brain have no fixed capture rate, this is an elastic limit, so different viewers can be more or less sensitive in perceiving frame rates.

It is possible to view the black space between frames and the passing of the shutter by rapidly blinking one's eyes at a certain rate. If done fast enough, the viewer will be able to randomly trap the darkness between frames or the motion of the shutter. This will not work with (now obsolete) cathode-ray tube displays, due to the persistence of the phosphors, nor with LCD or DLP light projectors, because they refresh the image instantly with no blackout intervals as with traditional film projectors.

Silent films usually were not projected at constant speeds, but could vary throughout the show because projectors were hand-cranked at the discretion of the projectionist, often following some notes provided by the distributor. When the electric motor supplanted hand cranking in both movie cameras and projectors, a more uniform frame rate became possible. Speeds ranged from about 18 frame/s on up – sometimes even faster than modern sound film speed (24 frame/s).

16 frame/s – though sometimes used as a camera shooting speed – was inadvisable for projection, due to the risk of the nitrate-base prints catching fire in the projector. Nitrate film stock began to be replaced by cellulose triacetate in 1948. A nitrate film fire and its devastating effect is featured in Cinema Paradiso (1988), a fictional film which partly revolves around a projectionist and his apprentice.

The birth of sound film created a need for a steady playback rate to prevent dialog and music from changing pitch and distracting the audience. Virtually all film projectors in commercial movie theaters project at a constant speed of 24 frame/s. This speed was chosen for both financial and technical reasons. A higher frame rate produces a better-looking picture but costs more as film stock is consumed faster. When Warner Bros. and Western Electric were trying to find the ideal compromise projection speed for the new sound pictures, Western Electric went to the Warner Theater in Los Angeles and noted the average speed at which films were projected there. They set that as the sound speed at which a satisfactory reproduction and amplification of sound could be conducted.

There are some specialist formats (e.g. Showscan and Maxivision) that project at higher rates—60 frames per second for Showscan and 48 for Maxivision. The Hobbit was shot at 48 frames per second and projected at the higher frame rate at specially equipped theaters.

Each frame of regular 24 fps movies are shown twice or more in a process called double-shuttering to reduce flicker.

== Principles of operation ==
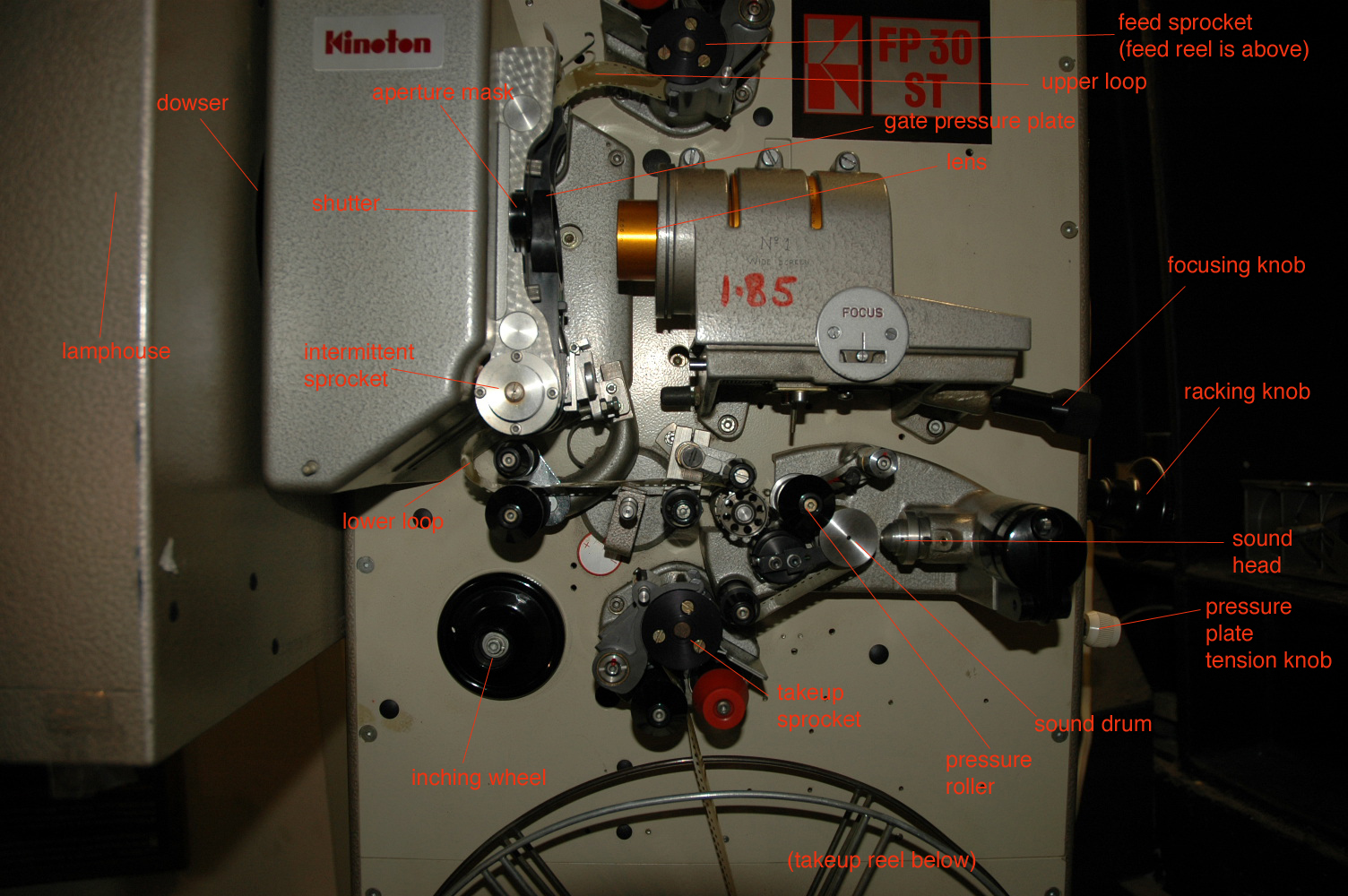
35 mm Kinoton FP30ST movie projector, with parts labeled. (Click thumbnail for larger text.)

=== Projection elements ===
As in a slide projector there are essential optical elements:

==== Light source ====
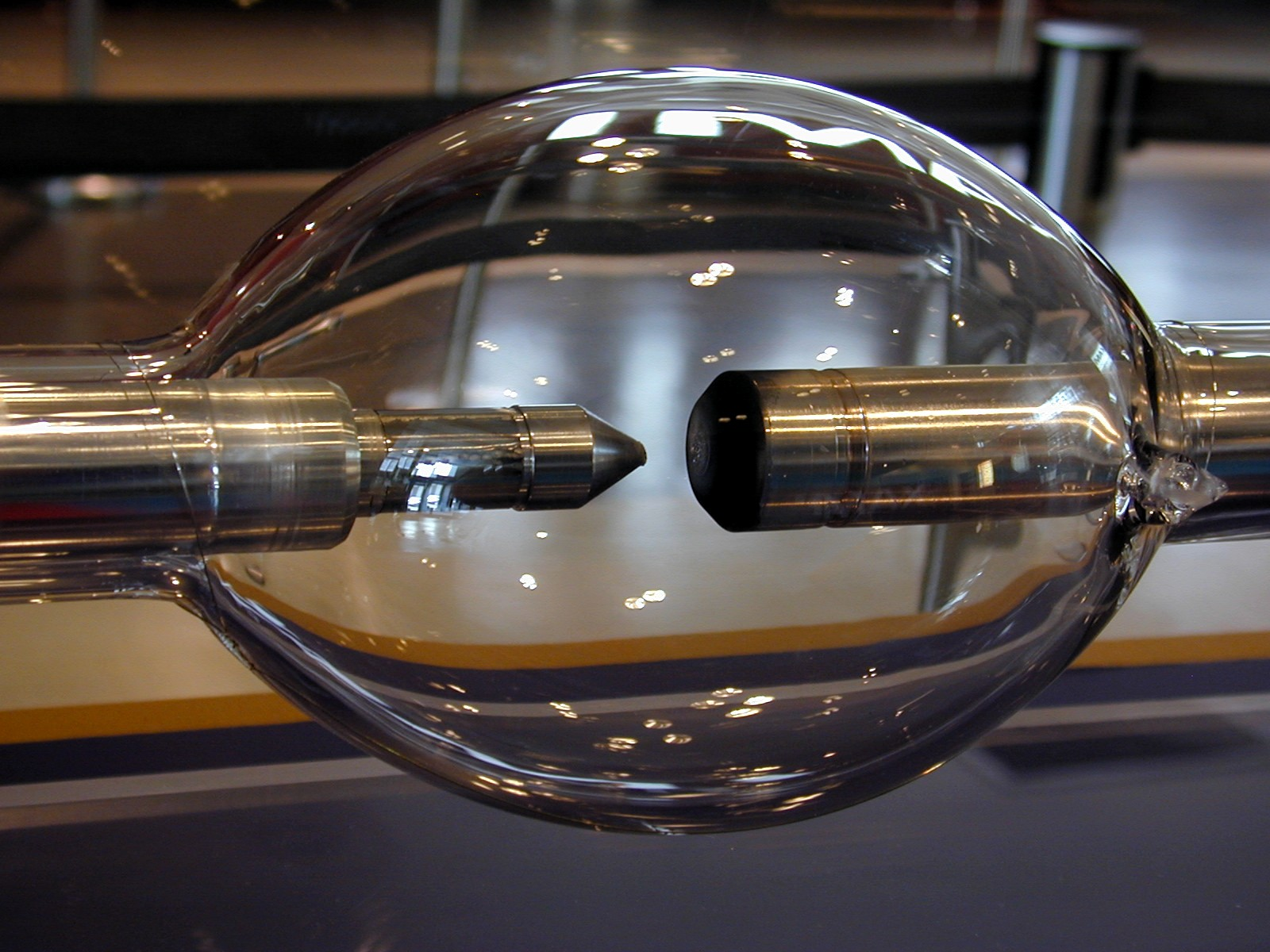
The 15 kW xenon short-arc lamp used in the IMAX projection system

Incandescent lighting and even limelight were the first light sources used in film projection. In the early 1900s up until the late 1960s, carbon arc lamps were the source of light in almost all theaters in the world.

The Xenon arc lamp was introduced in Germany in 1957 and in the US in 1963. After film platters became commonplace in the 1970s, Xenon lamps became the most common light source, as they could stay lit for extended periods of time, whereas a carbon rod used for a carbon arc could last for an hour at the most.

Most lamp houses in a professional theatrical setting produce sufficient heat to burn the film should the film remain stationary for more than a fraction of a second. Because of this, absolute care must be taken in inspecting a film so that it should not break in the gate and be damaged, particularly necessary in the era when flammable cellulose nitrate film stock was in use.

==== Reflector and condenser lens ====
A curved reflector redirects light that would otherwise be wasted toward the condensing lens.

A positive curvature lens concentrates the reflected and direct light toward the film gate.

==== Douser ====
(Also spelled dowser)

A metal or asbestos blade cuts off light before it can get to the film. The douser is usually part of the lamphouse and may be manually or automatically operated. Some projectors have a second, electrically controlled douser that is used for changeovers (sometimes called a changeover douser or changeover shutter). Some projectors have a third, mechanically controlled douser that automatically closes when the projector slows down (called a fire shutter or fire douser), to protect the film if the projector stops while the first douser is still open. Dousers protect the film when the lamp is on but the film is not moving, preventing the film from melting from prolonged exposure to the direct heat of the lamp. It also prevents the lens from scarring or cracking from excessive heat.

==== Film gate and frame advance ====
If a roll of film is continuously passed between the light source and the lens of the projector, only a continuous blurred series of images sliding from one edge to the other would be visible on the screen. In order to see an apparently moving clear picture, the moving film must be stopped and held still briefly while the shutter opens and closes. The gate is where the film is held still prior to the opening of the shutter. This is the case for both filming and projecting movies. A single image of the series of images comprising the movie is positioned and held flat within the gate. The gate also provides a slight amount of friction so that the film does not advance or retreat except when driven to advance the film to the next image. The intermittent mechanism advances the film within the gate to the next frame while the shutter is closed. Registration pins prevent the film from advancing while the shutter is open. In most cases the registration of the frame can be manually adjusted by the projectionist, and more sophisticated projectors can maintain registration automatically.

Animation showing a six-position Geneva drive in operation.

==== Shutter ====
It is the gate and shutter that gives the illusion of one full frame being replaced exactly on top of another full frame. The gate holds the film still while the shutter is open. A rotating petal or gated cylindrical shutter interrupts the emitted light during the time the film is advanced to the next frame. The viewer does not see the transition, thus tricking the brain into believing a moving image is on screen. Modern shutters are designed with a flicker-rate of two times (48 Hz) or even sometimes three times (72 Hz) the frame rate of the film, so as to reduce the perception of screen flickering. (See Frame rate and Flicker fusion threshold.) Higher rate shutters are less light efficient, requiring more powerful light sources for the same light on screen.

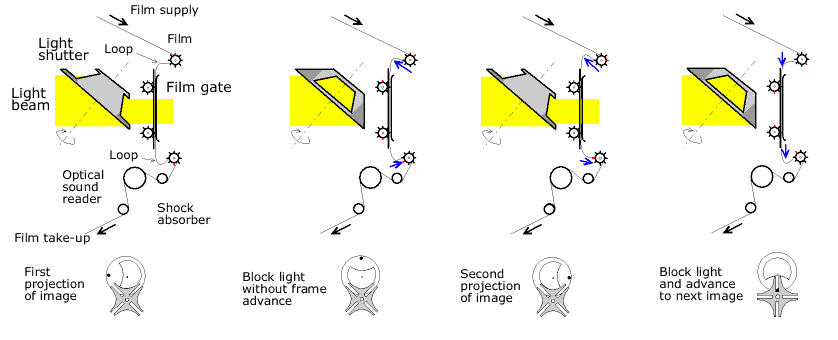
Mechanical sequence when image is shown twice and then advanced. Outer sprockets rotate continuously while the frame advance sprockets are controlled by the mechanism shown – a Geneva drive.

==== Imaging lens and aperture plate ====
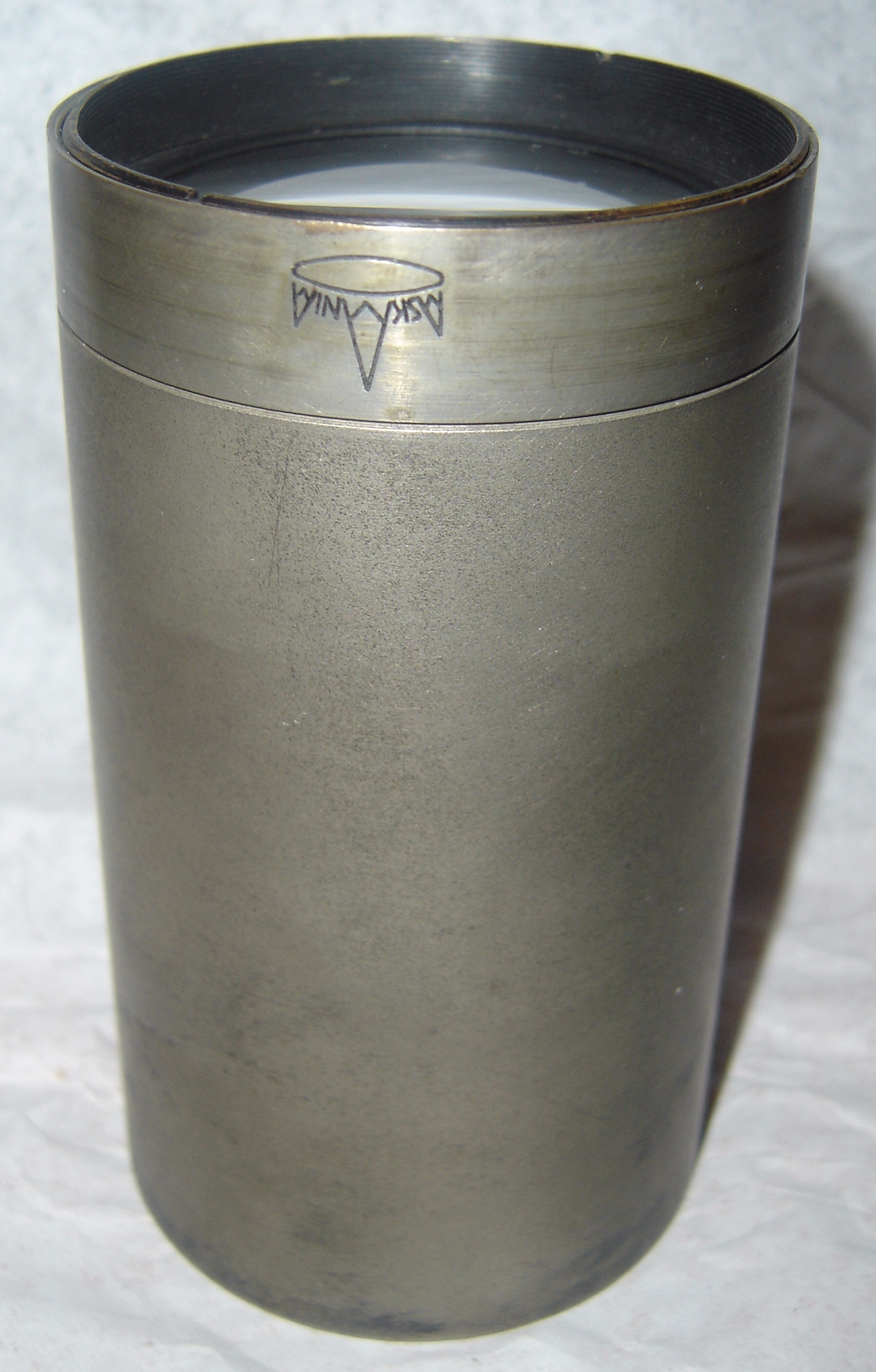
Imaging lens Diastar of an Askania 35 mm movie projector (focal length: 400 mm)

A projection objective with multiple optical elements directs the image of the film to a viewing screen. Projector lenses differ in aperture and focal length to suit different needs. Different lenses are used for different aspect ratios.

One way that aspect ratios are set is with the appropriate aperture plate, a piece of metal with a precisely cut rectangular hole in the middle of equivalent aspect ratio. The aperture plate is placed just behind the gate, and masks off any light from hitting the image outside of the area intended to be shown. All films, even those in the standard Academy ratio, have extra image on the frame that is meant to be masked off in the projection.

Using an aperture plate to accomplish a wider aspect ratio is inherently wasteful of film, as a portion of the standard frame is unused. One solution that presents itself at certain aspect ratios is the two-perf pulldown, where the film is advanced less than one full frame in order to reduce the unexposed area between frames. This method requires a special intermittent mechanism in all film-handling equipment throughout the production process, from the camera to the projector. This is costly, and prohibitively so for some theaters. The anamorphic format uses special optics to squeeze a high aspect ratio image onto a standard Academy frame thus eliminating the need to change the costly precision moving parts of the intermittent mechanisms. A special anamorphic lens is used on the camera to compress the image, and a corresponding lens on the projector to expand the image back to the intended aspect ratio.

==== Viewing screen ====
In most cases this is a reflective surface which may be either aluminized (for high contrast in moderate ambient light) or a white surface with small glass beads (for high brilliance under dark conditions). A switchable projection screen can be switched between opaque and clear by a safe voltage under 36V AC and is viewable from both sides. In a commercial theater, the screen also has millions of very small, evenly spaced holes in order to allow the passage of sound from the speakers and subwoofer which often are directly behind it.

=== Film transport elements ===
==== Film supply and takeup ====
===== Two-reel system =====
In the two-reel system the projector has two reels–one is the feed reel, which holds the part of the film that has not been shown, the other is the takeup reel, which winds the film that has been shown. In a two-reel projector the feed reel has a slight drag to maintain tension on the film, while the takeup reel is constantly driven with a mechanism that has mechanical slip, to allow the film to be wound under constant tension so the film is wound in a smooth manner.

The film being wound on the takeup reel is being wound head in, tails out. This means that the beginning (or head) of the reel is in the center, where it is inaccessible. As each reel is taken off of the projector, it must be re-wound onto another empty reel. In a theater setting there is often a separate machine for rewinding reels. For the 16 mm projectors that were often used in schools and churches, the projector could be re-configured to rewind films.

The size of the reels can vary based on the projectors, but generally films are divided and distributed in reels of up to 2,000 feet (610 metres), about 22 minutes at 24 frames/sec). Some projectors can even accommodate up to 6,000 feet (1,800 metres), which minimizes the number of changeovers (see below) in a showing. Certain countries also divide their film reels up differently; Russian films, for example, often come on 1,000-foot (300 m) reels, although it is likely that most projectionists working with changeovers would combine them into longer reels of at least 2,000 feet (610 metres), to minimize changeovers and also give sufficient time for threading and any possibly needed troubleshooting time.

Films are identified as single-reel short subjects, two-reelers (such as some of the early Laurel & Hardy, The Three Stooges, and other comedies), and features, which can take any number of reels (although most are limited to 1½ to 2 hours in length, enabling the theater to have multiple showings throughout the day and evening, each showing with a feature, commercials, and intermission to allow the audiences to change). For some time (ca. 1930–1960), a typical showing meant a short subject (a newsreel, short documentary, a two-reeler, etc.), a cartoon, and the feature. Some theaters would have movie-based commercials for local businesses, and the state of New Jersey required showing a diagram of the theater showing all of the exits.

===== Changeover systems =====
Because a single film reel does not contain enough film to show an entire feature, the film is distributed on multiple reels. To prevent having to interrupt the show when one reel ends and the next is mounted, two projectors are used in what is known as a changeover system. The projectionist would, at the appropriate point, manually stop the first projector, shutting off its light, and start the second projector, which they had ready and waiting. Later the switching was partially automated, although the projectionist still needed to rewind and mount the bulky, heavy film reels. (35mm reels as received by theaters came unrewound; rewinding was the task of the operator who received the reel.) The two-reel system, using two identical projectors, was used almost universally for movie theaters before the advent of the single-reel system. Projectors were built that could accommodate a much larger reel, containing an entire feature. Although one-reel long-play systems tend to be more popular with the newer multiplexes, the two-reel system is still in significant use to this day.

As the reel being shown approaches its end, the projectionist looks for cue marks at the upper-right corner of the picture. Usually these are dots or circles, although they can also be slashes. Some older films occasionally used squares or triangles, and sometimes positioned the cues in the middle of the right edge of the picture.

The first cue appears twelve feet (3.7 metres) before the end of the program on the reel, equivalent to eight seconds at the standard speed of 24 frames per second. This cue signals the projectionist to start the motor of the projector containing the next reel. After another ten and a half feet (3.2 m) of film is shown (seven seconds at 24 frames/sec), the changeover cue should appear, which signals the projectionist to actually make the changeover. When this second cue appears, the projectionist has one and a half feet (460 mm), or one second, to make the changeover. If it does not occur within one second, the film will end and blank white light will be projected on the screen.

Twelve feet before the first frame of action countdown leaders have a start frame. The projectionist positions the start frame in the gate of the projector. When the first cue is seen, the motor of the starting projector is started. Seven seconds later the end of the leader and start of program material on the new reel should just reach the gate of the projector when the changeover cue is seen.

On some projectors, the operator would be alerted to the time for a change by a bell that operated when the feed reel rotation exceeded a certain speed (the feed reel rotates faster as the film is exhausted), or based on the diameter of the remaining film (Premier Changeover Indicator Pat. No. 411992), although many projectors do not have such an auditory system.

During the initial operation of a changeover, the two projectors use an interconnected electrical control connected to the changeover button so that as soon as the button is pressed, the changeover douser on the outgoing projector is closed in sync with the changeover douser on the incoming projector opening. If done properly, a changeover should be virtually unnoticeable to an audience. In older theaters, there may be manually operated, sliding covers in front of the projection booth's windows. A changeover with this system is often clearly visible as a wipe on the screen.

Once the changeover has been made, the projectionist unloads the full takeup reel from projector A moves the now-empty reel (that used to hold the film just unloaded) from the feed spindle to the takeup spindle, and loads reel #3 of the presentation on projector A. When reel 2 on projector B is finished, the changeover switches the live show from projector B back to projector A, and so on for the rest of the show.

When the projectionist removes a finished reel from the projector it is tails out, and needs to be rewound before the next show. The projectionist usually uses a separate rewind machine and a spare empty reel and rewinds the film so it is head out, ready to project again for the next show.

One advantage of this system (at least for the theatre management) was that if a program was running a few minutes late for any reason, the projectionist would simply omit one (or more) reels of film to recover the time.

In the early years, with no automation, errors were far from unknown: these included starting a movie that had not been rewound and getting reels confused, so they were projected in the wrong order. Correcting either of these, assuming that someone could tell that the reels were confused, required a complete stop of both projectors, often turning on the house lights, and a delay of a minute or so while the projectionist corrected the error and restarted a projector. These highly visible gaffes, which embarrassed the theater operators, were eliminated with the single-reel and digital systems.

===== Single-reel system =====
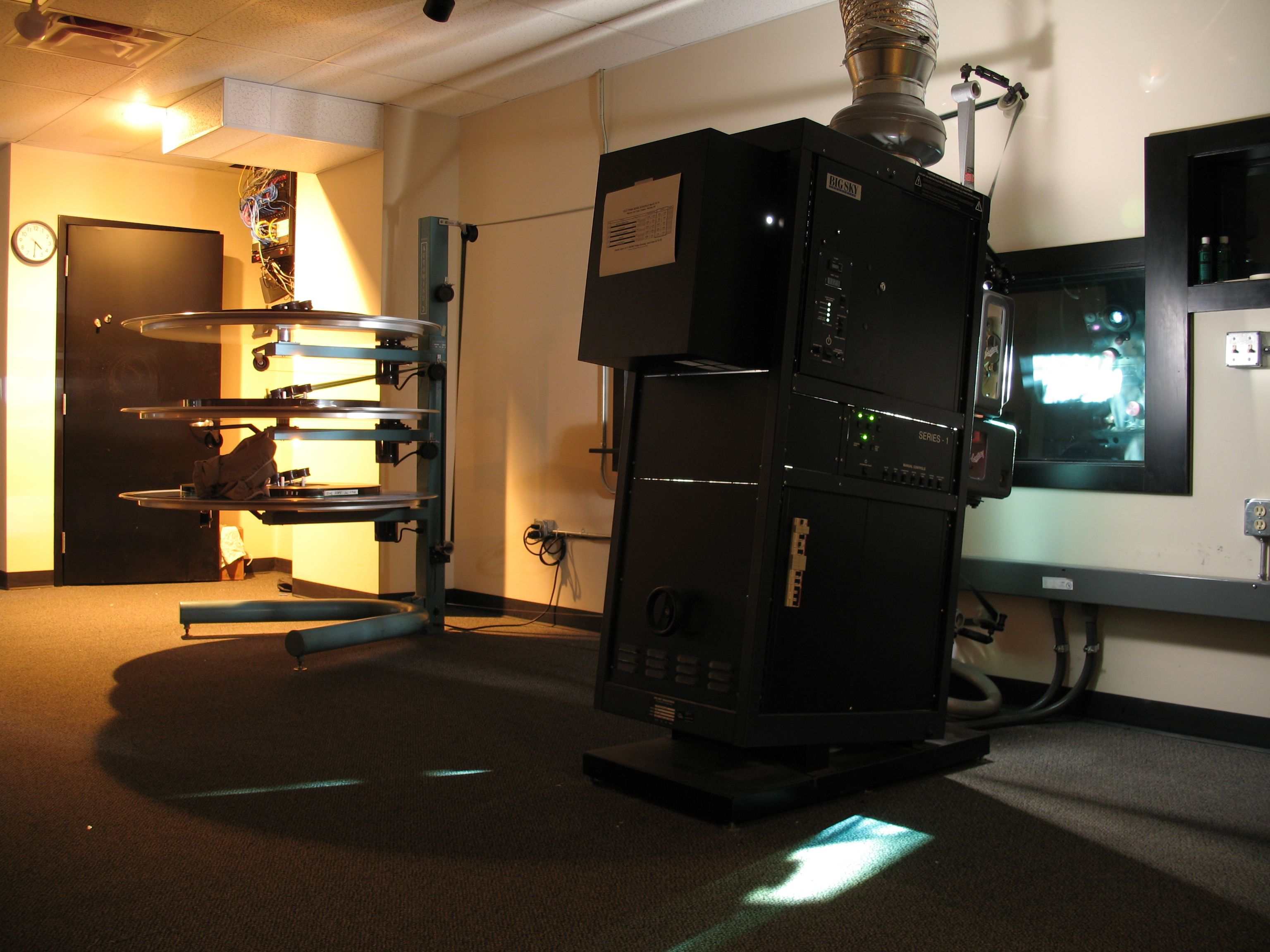
Christie AW3 platter, BIG SKY Industries console, and Century SA projector

There are two widely used single-reel systems (also known as long-play systems) today: the tower system (vertical feed and takeup) and the platter system (non-rewinding; horizontal feed and takeup).

The tower system largely resembles the two-reel system, except in that the tower itself is generally a separate piece of equipment used with a slightly modified standard projector. The feed and takeup reels are held vertically on the axis, except behind the projector, on oversized spools with 12,000-foot (3,700 m) capacity or about 133 minutes at 24 frame/s. This large capacity alleviates the need for a changeover on an average-length feature; all of the reels are spliced together into one giant one. The tower is designed with four spools, two on each side, each with its own motor. This allows the whole spool to be immediately rewound after a showing; the extra two spools on the other side allow for a film to be shown while another is being rewound or even made up directly onto the tower. Each spool requires its own motor in order to set proper tensioning for the film since it has to travel (relatively) much further between the projector film transport and the spools. As each spool gains or loses film, the tension must be periodically checked and adjusted so that the film can be transported on and off the spools without either sagging or snapping.

In a platter system the individual 20-minute reels of film are also spliced together as one large reel, but the film is then wound onto a horizontal rotating table called a platter. Three or more platters are stacked together to create a platter system. Most of the platters in a platter system will be occupied by film prints; whichever platter happens to be empty serves as the take-up reel to receive the film that is playing from another platter.

The way the film is fed from the platter to the projector is not unlike an eight-track audio cartridge. Film is unwound from the center of the platter through a mechanism called a payout unit which controls the speed of the platter's rotation so that it matches the speed of the film as it is fed to the projector. The film winds through a series of rollers from the platter stack to the projector, through the projector, through another series of rollers back to the platter stack, and then onto the platter serving as the take-up reel.

This system makes it possible to project a film multiple times without needing to rewind it. As the projectionist threads the projector for each showing, the payout unit is transferred from the empty platter to the full platter and the film then plays back onto the platter it came from. In the case of a double feature, each film plays from a full platter onto an empty platter, swapping positions on the platter stack throughout the day.

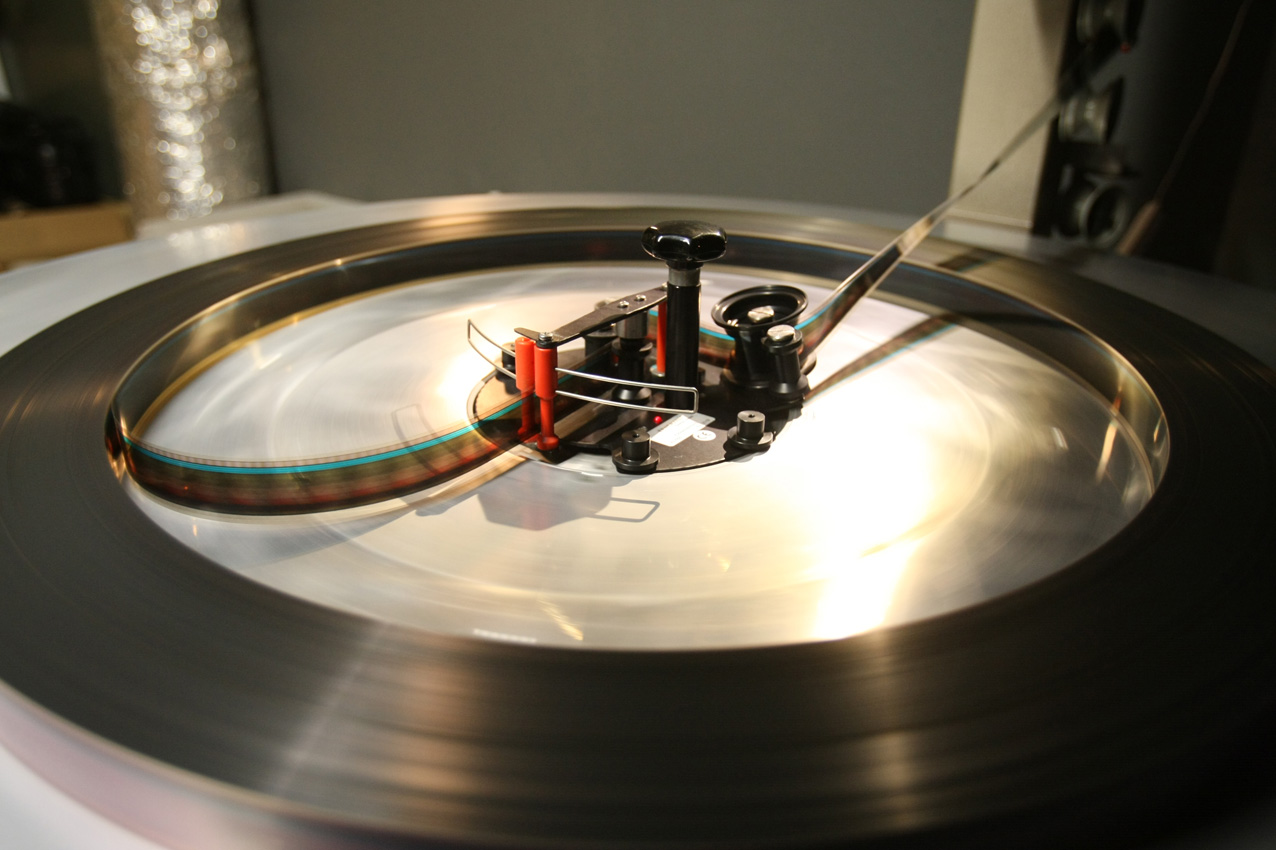
nonrewind in Royal – Malmö, Sweden

The advantage of a platter is that the film need not be rewound after each show, which can save labor. Rewinding risks rubbing the film against itself, which can cause scratching of the film and smearing of the emulsion that carries the pictures. The disadvantages of the platter system are that the film can acquire diagonal scratches on it if proper care is not taken while threading film from platter to projector, and the film has more opportunity to collect dust and dirt as long lengths of film are exposed to the air. A clean projection booth kept at the proper humidity is of great importance, as are cleaning devices that can remove dirt from the film print as it plays.

===== Automation and the rise of the multiplex =====
The single reel system can allow for the complete automation of the projection booth operations, given the proper auxiliary equipment. Since films are still transported in multiple reels they must be joined when placed on the projector reel and taken apart when the film is to be returned to the distributor. It is the complete automation of projection that has enabled the modern multiplex cinema – a single site typically containing from 8 to 24 theaters/auditoriums with only a few projection and sound technicians, rather than a platoon of projectionists. The multiplex also offers a great amount of flexibility to a theater operator, enabling theaters to exhibit the same popular production in more than one auditorium with staggered starting times. It is also possible, with the proper equipment installed, to interlock, i.e. thread a single length of film through multiple projectors. This is very useful when dealing with the mass crowds that an extremely popular film may generate in the first few days of showing, as it allows for a single print to serve more patrons.

==== Feed and extraction sprockets ====
Smooth wheels with triangular pins called sprockets engage perforations punched into one or both edges of the film stock. These serve to set the pace of film movement through the projector and any associated sound playback system.

==== Film loop ====
As with motion picture cameras, the intermittent motion of the gate requires that there be loops above and below the gate in order to serve as a buffer between the constant speed enforced by the sprockets above and below the gate and the intermittent motion enforced at the gate. Some projectors also have a sensitive trip pin above the gate to guard against the upper loop becoming too big. If the loop hits the pin, it will close the dousers and stop the motor to prevent an excessively large loop from jamming the projector.

==== Film gate pressure plate ====
A spring-loaded pressure plate functions to align the film in a consistent image plane, both flat and perpendicular to the optical axis. It also provides sufficient drag to prevent film motion during the frame display, while still allowing free motion under control of the intermittent mechanism. The plate also has spring-loaded runners to help hold film while in place and advance it during motion.

==== Intermittent mechanism ====
The intermittent mechanism can be constructed in different ways. For smaller gauge projectors (8 mm and 16 mm), a pawl mechanism engages the film's sprocket hole one side, or holes on each side. This pawl advances only when the film is to be moved to the next image. As the pawl retreats for the next cycle it is drawn back and does not engage the film. This is similar to the claw mechanism in a motion picture camera.

In 35 mm and 70 mm projectors, there usually is a special sprocket immediately underneath the pressure plate, known as the intermittent sprocket. Unlike all the other sprockets in the projector, which run continuously, the intermittent sprocket operates in tandem with the shutter, and only moves while the shutter is blocking the lamp, so that the motion of the film cannot be seen. It also moves in a discrete amount at a time, equal to the number of perforations that make up a frame (4 for 35 mm, 5 for 70 mm). The intermittent movement in these projectors is usually provided by a Geneva drive, also known as the Maltese Cross mechanism.

IMAX projectors use what is known as the rolling loop method, in which each frame is sucked into the gate by a vacuum and positioned by registration pins in the perforations corresponding to that frame.

== Types ==
Projectors are classified by the size of the film used, i.e. the film format. Typical film sizes:

=== 8 mm ===
Long used for home movies before the video camera, this uses double-sprocketed 16 mm film, which is run through the camera, exposing one side, then removed from the camera, the takeup and feed reels are switched, and the film run through a second time, exposing the other side. The 16 mm film is then split lengthwise into two 8 mm pieces that are spliced to make a single projectable film with sprockets holes on one side.

=== Super 8 ===
Developed by Kodak, this film stock uses very small sprocket holes close to the edge that allow more of the film stock to be used for the images. This increases the quality of the image. The unexposed film is supplied in the 8 mm width, not split during processing as is the earlier 8 mm. Magnetic stripes could be added to carry encoded sound to be added after film development. Film could also be pre-striped for direct sound recording in suitably equipped cameras for later projection.

=== 9.5 mm ===
Film format introduced by Pathé Frères in 1922 as part of the Pathé Baby amateur film system. It was conceived initially as an inexpensive format to provide copies of commercially made films to home users. The format uses a single, central perforation (sprocket hole) between each pair of frames, as opposed to 8 mm film which has perforations along one edge, and most other film formats which have perforations on each side of the image. It became very popular in Europe over the next few decades and is still used by a small number of enthusiasts today. Over 300,000 projectors were produced and sold mainly in France and England, and many commercial features were available in the format. In the sixties, the last projectors of this format were being produced. The gauge is still alive today. 16 mm projectors are converted to 9,5mm and it is still possible to buy film stock (from the French Color City company).

=== 16 mm ===
This was a popular format for audio-visual use in schools and as a high-end home entertainment system before the advent of broadcast television. In broadcast television news, 16 mm film was used before the advent of electronic news-gathering. The most popular home content were comedic shorts (typically less than 20 minutes in length in the original release) and bundles of cartoons previously seen in movie theaters. 16 mm enjoys widespread use today as a format for short films, independent features and music videos, being a relatively economical alternative to 35 mm. 16 mm film was a popular format used for the production of TV shows well into the HDTV era.

=== 35 mm ===
The most common film size for theatrical productions during the 20th century. In fact, the common 35 mm camera, developed by Leica, was designed to use this film stock and was originally intended to be used for test shots by movie directors and cinematographers.

A diagram of the VistaVision format

35 mm film is typically run vertically through the camera and projector. In the mid-1950s the VistaVision system presented widescreen movies in which the film moved horizontally, allowing much more film to be used for the image as this avoided the anamorphic reduction of the image to fit the frame width. As this required specific projectors it was largely unsuccessful as a presentation method while remaining attractive as filming, intermediate, and source for production printing and as an intermediate step in special effects to avoid film granularity, although the latter is now supplanted by digital methods.

=== 70 mm ===
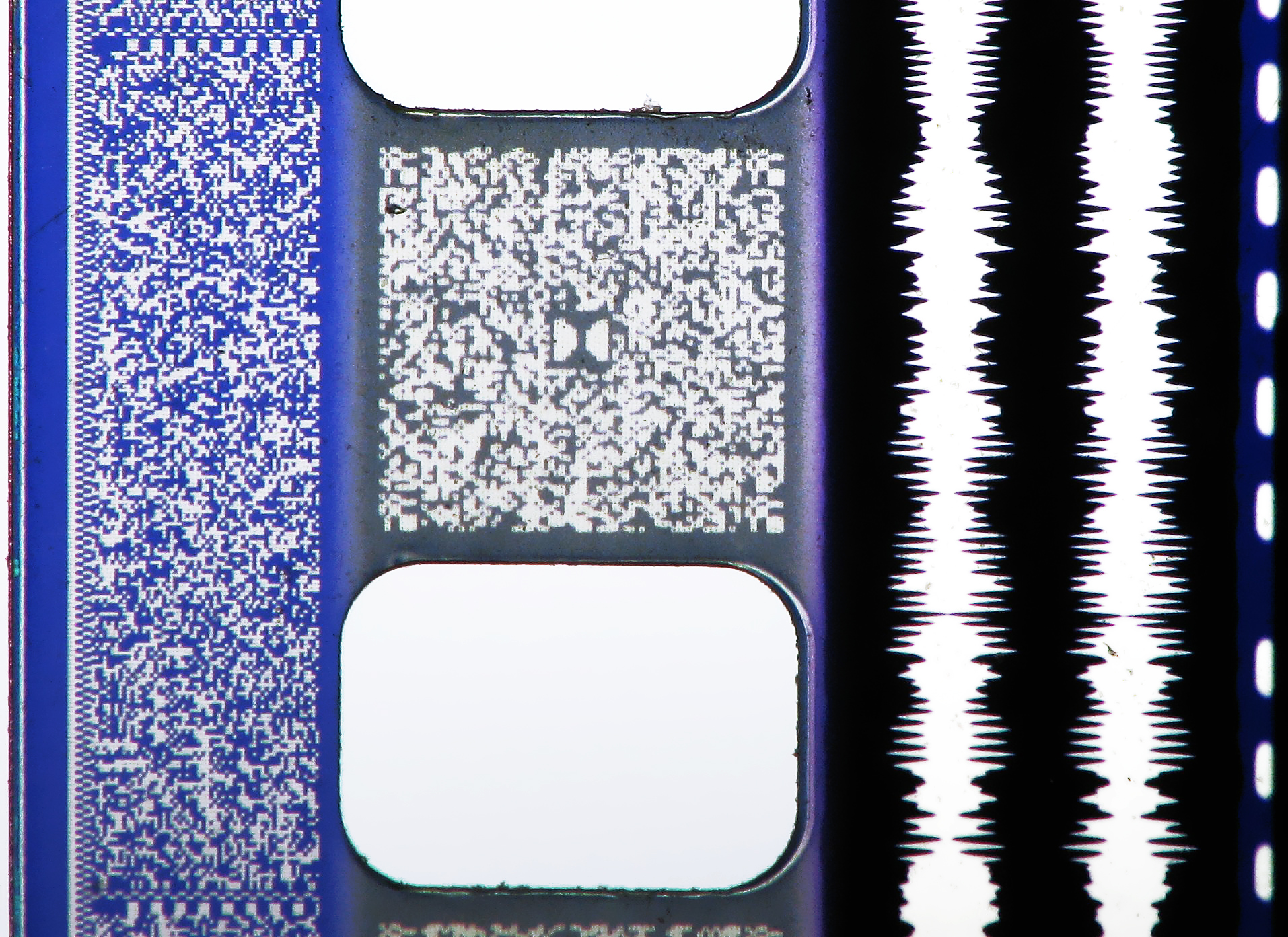
A photo of a 35 mm film print featuring all four audio formats (or quad track) – from left to right: SDDS (blue area to the left of the sprocket holes), Dolby Digital (grey area between the sprocket holes labelled with the Dolby Double-D logo in the middle), analog optical sound (the two white lines to the right of the sprocket holes), and the Datasat time code (the dashed line to the far right.)

High-end movie productions were often produced in this film gauge in the 1950s and 1960s and many very large screen theaters are still capable of projecting it in the 21st century. It is often referred to as 65/70, as the camera uses film 65 mm wide, but the projection prints are 70 mm wide. The extra five millimeters of film accommodated the soundtrack, usually a six-track magnetic stripe. The most common theater installation would use dual-gauge 35/70 mm projectors.

70 mm film is also used in both the flat and domed IMAX projection system. In IMAX the film is transported horizontally in the film gate, similar to VistaVision. Some productions intended for 35 mm anamorphic release were also released using 70 mm film stock. A 70 mm print made from a 35 mm negative is significantly better in appearance than an all-35 mm process and allowed for a release with six-track magnetic audio.

The advent of 35 mm prints with digital soundtracks in the 1990s largely supplanted the widespread release of the more expensive 70 mm prints.

== Sound ==
Regardless of the sound format, any sound represented on the film image itself will not be the sound for the particular frame it occupies. In the gate of the projector head, there is no space for a reader, and the film is not travelling smoothly at the gate position. Consequently, all optical sound formats must be offset from the image because the sound reader is usually located above (for magnetic readers and most digital optical readers) or below (for analog optical readers and a few digital optical) the projector head.

See the 35 mm film article for more information on both digital and analog methods.

=== Optical ===
Optical sound constitutes the recording and reading of amplitude based on the amount of light that is projected through a soundtrack area on a film using an illuminating light or laser and a photocell or photodiode. As the photocell picks up the light in varying intensities, the electricity produced is intensified by an amplifier, which in turn powers a loudspeaker, where the electrical impulses are turned into air vibrations and thus, sound waves. In 16 mm, this optical soundtrack is a single mono track placed on the right side of the projected image, and the sound head is 26 frames after the gate. In 35 mm, this can be mono or stereo, on the left side of the projected image, with the sound head 21 frames after the gate.

The first form of optical sound was represented by horizontal bands of clear (white) and solid (black) area. The space between solid points represented amplitude and was picked up by the photo-electric cell on the other side of a steady, thin beam of light being shined through it. This variable density form of sound was eventually phased out because of its incompatibility with color stocks. The alternative and ultimately the successor of variable density has been the variable area track, in which a clear, vertical waveform against black represents the sound, and the width of the waveform is equivalent to the amplitude. Variable area does have slightly less frequency response than variable density, but because of the grain and variable infrared absorption of various film stocks, variable density has a lower signal-to-noise ratio.

Optical stereo is recorded and read through a bilateral variable area track. Dolby MP matrix encoding is used to add extra channels beyond the stereo pair. Left, center, right and surround channels are matrix-encoded into the two optical tracks, and decoded using licensed equipment.

In the 1970s and early 1980s, optical sound Super-8 mm copies were produced mainly for airline in-flight movies. Even though this technology was soon made obsolete by video equipment, the majority of small-gauge films used magnetic sound rather than optical sound for a higher frequency range.

=== Magnetic ===
Magnetic sound is no longer used in commercial cinema, but between 1952 and the early 1990s (when optical digital movie sound rendered it obsolete) it provided the highest fidelity sound from film because of its wider frequency range and superior signal-to-noise ratio compared to optical sound. There are two forms of magnetic sound in conjunction with projection: double-head and striped.

The first form of magnetic sound was the double-head system, in which the movie projector was interlocked with a dubber playing a 35 mm reel of a full-coat, or film completely coated with magnetic iron-oxide. This was introduced in 1952 with Cinerama, holding six tracks of stereophonic sound. Stereophonic releases throughout 1953 also used an interlocked full-coat for three-channel stereophonic sound.

In interlock, since the sound is on a separate reel, it does not need to be offset from the image. Today, this system is usually used only for very low-budget or student productions, or for screening rough cuts of films before the creation of a final married print. Sync between the two reels is checked with SMPTE leader, also known as countdown leader. If the two reels are synced, there should be one frame of beep sound exactly on the 2 frame of the countdown – two seconds, or 48 frames, before the picture start.

Striped magnetic film is motion picture film in which stripes of magnetic oxide are placed on the film between the sprocket holes and the edge of the film, and sometimes also between the sprocket holes and the image. Each of these stripes has one channel of the audio recorded on it. This technique was first introduced in September, 1953 by Hazard E. Reeves for Cinemascope. Four tracks are present on the film: Left, Center, Right and Surround. This 35 mm four-track magnetic sound format was used from 1954 through 1982 for roadshow screenings of big-budget feature films.

70 mm, which had no optical sound, used the five millimeters gained between the 65 mm negative and the final release print to place three magnetic tracks outside of the perforations on each side of the film for a total of six tracks. Until the introduction of digital sound, it was fairly common for 35 mm films to be blown up to 70 mm often just to take advantage of the greater number of soundtracks and the fidelity of the audio.

Although magnetic audio was of excellent quality it also had significant disadvantages. Magnetic sound prints were expensive, 35 mm magnetic prints cost roughly twice as much as optical sound prints, whilst 70 mm prints could cost up to 15 times as much as 35 mm prints. Furthermore, the oxide layer wore out faster than the film itself, and magnetic tracks were prone to damage and accidental erasure. Because of the high cost of installing magnetic sound reproduction equipment only a minority of movie theaters ever installed it and the magnetic soundheads needed considerable maintenance to keep their performance up to standard. As a consequence the use of the Cinemascope 35 mm four-track magnetic sound format decreased significantly during the course of the 1960s and received stiff competition from the Dolby SVA optical encoding format. However, 70 mm film continued to be used for prestigious roadshow screenings until the introduction of digital sound on 35 mm film in the early 1990s removed one of the major justifications for using this expensive format.

On certain stocks of Super 8 and 16 mm an iron-oxide sound recording strip was added for the direct synchronous recording of sound which could then be played by projectors with a magnetic sound head. It has since been discontinued by Kodak on both gauges.

=== Digital ===
Modern theatrical systems use optical representations of digitally encoded multi-channel sound. An advantage of digital systems is that the offset between the sound and picture heads can be varied and then set with the digital processors. Digital sound heads are usually above the gate. All digital sound systems currently in use have the ability to instantly and gracefully fall back to the analog optical sound system should the digital data be corrupt or the whole system fail.

==== Cinema Digital Sound (CDS) ====
Created by Kodak and ORC (Optical Radiation Corporation), Cinema Digital Sound was the first attempt to bring multi-channel digital sound to first-run theaters. CDS was available on both 35 mm and 70 mm films. Film prints equipped with CDS did not have the conventional analog optical or magnetic soundtracks to serve as a back-up in case the digital sound was unreadable. Another disadvantage of not having an analog back-up track is that CDS required extra film prints be made for the theaters equipped to play CDS. The three formats that followed, Dolby Digital, DTS and SDDS, can co-exist with each other and the analog optical soundtrack on a single version of the film print. This means that a film print carrying all three of these formats (and the analog optical format, usually Dolby SR) can be played in whichever format the theater is equipped to handle. CDS did not achieve widespread use and ultimately failed. It premiered with the film Dick Tracy and was used with several other films, such as Days of Thunder and Terminator 2: Judgment Day.

==== Sony Dynamic Digital Sound (SDDS) ====
SDDS runs on the outside of 35 mm film, between the perforations and the edges, on both edges of the film. It was the first digital system that could handle up to eight channels of sound. The additional two tracks are for an extra pair of screen channels (Left Center and Right Center) located between the 3 regular screen channels (Left, Center and Right). A pair of CCDs located in a unit above the projector reads the two SDDS tracks. The information is decoded and decompressed before being passed along to the cinema sound processor. By default, SDDS units use an onboard Sony Cinema Sound Processor, and when the system is set up in this manner, the theatre's entire sound system can be equalized in the digital domain. The audio data in an SDDS track is compressed in the 20-bit ATRAC2 compression scheme at a ratio of about 4.5:1. SDDS premiered with the film Last Action Hero. SDDS was the least commercially successful of the three competing digital sound systems for 35 mm film. Sony ceased the sale of SDDS processors in 2001–2002.

==== Dolby Digital ====
Dolby Digital data is printed in the spaces between the perforations on the soundtrack side of the film, 26 frames before the picture. Release prints with Dolby Digital always include an analog Dolby Stereo soundtrack with Dolby SR noise reduction, thus these prints are known as Dolby SR-D prints. Dolby Digital produces 6 discrete channels. In a variant called SR-D EX, the left and right surround channels can be dematrixed into left, right, and back surround, using a matrix system similar to Dolby Pro Logic. The audio data in a Dolby Digital track is compressed in the 16-bit AC-3 compression scheme at a ratio of about 12:1. The images between each perforation are read by a CCD located either above the projector or in the regular analog sound head below the film gate, a digital delay within the processor allowing correct lip-sync to be achieved regardless of the position of the reader relative to the picture gate. The information is then decoded, decompressed and converted to analog; this can happen either in a separate Dolby Digital processor that feeds signals to the cinema sound processor, or digital decoding can be built into the cinema processor. One disadvantage of this system is if the digital printing is not entirely within the space between the sprocket holes; if the track was off a bit on either the top or the bottom, the sound track would be unplayable, and a replacement reel would have to be ordered.

In 2006, Dolby discontinued the sale of their external SR-D processor (the DA20), but included Dolby Digital decoding in their CP500 and later CP650 cinema processors.

A consumer version of Dolby Digital is also used on most DVDs, often at higher data rates than the original film. A bit-for-bit version is used on Blu-ray Discs and HD DVDs called Dolby TrueHD. Dolby Digital officially premiered with the film Batman Returns, but it was earlier tested at some screenings of Star Trek VI: The Undiscovered Country.

==== Digital Theater Systems (DTS) ====
DTS actually stores the sound information on separate CD-ROMs supplied with the film. The CDs are fed into a special, modified computer that syncs up with the film through the use of DTS time code, decompresses the sound, and passes it through to a standard cinema processor. The time code is placed between the optical soundtracks and the actual picture and is read by an optical LED ahead of the gate. The time code is actually the only sound system that is not offset within the film from the picture but still needs to be physically set offset ahead of the gate in order to maintain continuous motion. Each disc can hold slightly over 90 minutes of sound, so longer films require a second disc. Three types of DTS sound exist: DTS-ES (Extended Surround), an 8-channel digital system; DTS-6, a 6-track digital system, and a now-obsolete 4 channel system. DTS-ES derives a back surround channel from the left surround and right surround channels using Dolby Pro Logic. The audio data in a DTS track is compressed in the 20-bit APTX-100 compression scheme at a ratio of 4:1.

Of the three digital formats currently in use, DTS is the only one that has been used with 70 mm presentations. DTS was premiered on Jurassic Park. Datasat Digital Entertainment, purchaser of DTS's cinema division in May 2008, now distributes Datasat Digital Sound to professional cinemas worldwide. A consumer version of DTS is available on some DVDs, and was used to broadcast stereo TV prior to DTV. A bit-for-bit version of the DTS soundtrack is on Blu-ray Discs and HD DVDs called DTS-HD MA (DTS-HD Master Audio).

== Leaders ==
Academy leader is placed at the head of film release prints containing information for the projectionist and featuring numbers which are black on a clear background, counting from 11 to 3 at 16-frame intervals (16 frames in 35 mm film = 1 ft). At −12 feet there is a START frame. The numbers appear as a single frame in opaque black leader.

SMPTE leader is placed at the head of film release prints or video masters containing information for the projectionist or video playback tech. The numbers count down in seconds from 8 to 2 at 24-frame intervals ending at the first frame of the 2 followed by 47 film frames of dark gray or black. Each number is held on the screen for 24 frames while an animated sweep-arm moves clockwise behind the number. As the sweep arm moves across the background field, the color changes from light gray to dark gray. Unlike the other numbers, the 2 only appears for one frame.

Usually there's a one-frame audio pop that plays 48 film frames (two seconds at 24 frames per second) before the first frame of action (FFOA). The pop is used to line up and synchronize audio and picture/video during printing processes or postproduction. The pop is in editorial (level) synchronization with the 2 frame on the SMPTE and EBU leader, and with the 3 frame on the academy leader. On most theatrical release prints, the pop is removed by the laboratory to avoid any accidental playing of it during a screening.

EBU leader (European Broadcast Union) is very similar to the SMPTE leader but with some superficial graphics differences.

== Types of lenses and screens ==
=== Spherical ===
Most motion picture lenses are of the spherical variety. Spherical lenses do not distort the image intentionally. Used alone for standard and cropped widescreen projection, and in conjunction with an anamorphic adapter for anamorphic widescreen projection, the spherical lens is the most common and versatile projection lens type.

=== Anamorphic ===
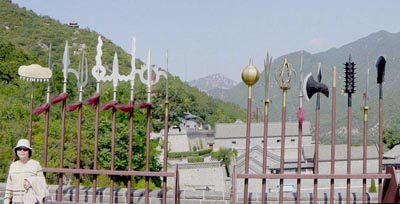
Simulated wide screen image with 1.96 to 1 ratio as it would be seen in a camera viewfinder or on a theater screen

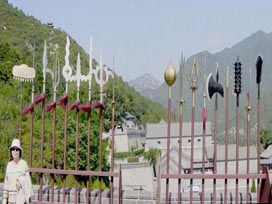
Simulated anamorphed image with 1.33 to 1 ratio (4:3) as it would appear on a frame of film

Anamorphic filming uses only special lenses, and requires no other modifications to the camera, projector and intermediate gear. The intended widescreen image is compressed optically, using additional cylindrical elements within the lens so that when the compressed image strikes the film, it matches the standard frame size of the camera. At the projector a corresponding lens restores the wide aspect ratio to be seen on the screen. The anamorphic element can be an attachment to existing spherical lenses.

Some anamorphic formats utilized a more squarish aspect ratio (1.18:1, vs. the Academy 1.375:1 ratio) on-film in order to accommodate more magnetic or optical tracks. Various anamorphic implementations have been marketed under several brand names, including CinemaScope, Panavision and Superscope, with Technirama implementing a slightly different anamorphic technique using vertical expansion to the film rather than horizontal compression. Large format anamorphic processes included Ultra Panavision and MGM Camera 65 (which was renamed Ultra Panavision 70 in the early 60s). Anamorphic is sometimes called scope in theater projection parlance, presumably in reference to CinemaScope.

=== Fish eye with dome ===
The IMAX dome projection method (called OMNIMAX) uses 70 mm film running sideways through the projector to maximize the image area and extreme wide angle lenses to obtain an almost hemispherical image. The field of view is tilted, as is the projection hemisphere, so one may view a portion of the ground in the foreground. Owing to the great area covered by the picture it is not as bright as seen with flat screen projection, but the immersive qualities are quite convincing. While there are not many theaters capable of displaying this format there are regular productions in the fields of nature, travel, science, and history, and productions may be viewed in most large urban regions. These dome theaters are mostly located in large and prosperous science and technology museums.

=== Wide and deep flat screen ===
The IMAX flat screen system uses large format film, a wide and deep screen, and close and quite steep stadium seating. The effect is to fill the visual field to a greater degree than is possible with conventional wide-screen systems. Like the IMAX dome, this is found in major urban areas, but unlike the dome system it is practical to reformat existing movie releases to this method. Also, the geometry of the theater and screen are more amenable to inclusion within a newly constructed but otherwise conventional multiple theater complex than is the dome-style theater.

=== Multiple cameras and projectors ===
One widescreen development during the 1950s used non-anamorphic projection but used three side-by-side synchronized projectors. Called Cinerama, the images were projected onto an extremely wide, curved screen. Some seams were said to be visible between the images but the almost complete filling of the visual field made up for this. This showed some commercial success as a limited location (only in major cities) exhibition of the technology in This is Cinerama, but the only memorable story-telling film made for this technology was How the West Was Won, widely seen only in its Cinemascope re-release.

While neither a technical nor a commercial success, the business model survives as implemented by the documentary production, limited release locations, and long-running exhibitions of IMAX dome movies.

== Three-dimensional ==
For techniques used to display pictures with a three-dimensional appearance (3D), see the 3D film article for some movie history and the stereoscopy article for technical information.

== See also ==
- Film format
- List of motion picture film formats
- Projector (disambiguation) for a directory of projector types
- Projectionist
- Movietone sound system
- Sound follower
