= IMAX Magic Carpet =

IMAX Magic Carpet is a large format film system, using two IMAX 15/70 mm film format projectors. One of the projectors projects onto a screen in front of the audience, the second projector projects onto a screen under the audience, which is visible through a transparent floor. The system was demonstrated in Osaka in 1990, and two films were produced for the format; Flying Raft and Flowers in the Sky.

== See also ==
- List of film formats
