= Joly-Normandin =

Joly-Normandin is a motion picture film format.

It was developed by Henri Joly and Ernest Normandin

== See also ==
- List of motion picture film formats
