= George W. Bingham =

American politician

George W. Bingham was a member of the Wisconsin State Assembly. Bingham was born on April 6, 1860, in Friendship, Wisconsin. In 1888, he married Nellie A. Wilbur. He died on March 10, 1947.

== Career ==
Bingham was a member of the Assembly during the 1911, 1913 and 1929 sessions. He was also president of Friendship, as well as County Treasurer, Sheriff and Chairman of the Republican Committee of Barron County, Wisconsin.
