= Henri Joly =

French pioneer in motion picture development

Henri Joly (1866–1945) was a French inventor and businessman. He developed early versions of motion picture film, cameras, and projectors.

== Biography ==
Joly was born in Viomenil, Vosges in 1866. By 1889 he was a gymnastics instructor at the school of Joinville, and was introduced to the nascent moving-picture technology when pioneers Étienne-Jules Marey and Georges Demenÿ (who was also a gymnast) came there to make motion-picture studies. Joly became acquainted with the Edison Kinetoscope when it was publicly introduced in Paris in 1894. In 1895 Joly met Charles Pathé, a Vincennes merchant who sold phonographs, who began importing pirated Kinetoscopes (made by Robert W. Paul in England) in May 1895.

== Film-related career ==
The short "movies" presented on the early Kinetoscopes had little variety, and they rapidly wore out. As Joly became aware of these shortcomings, he offered to make a camera for Pathé that could be used to reproduce the Kinetoscope films. Pathé agreed to fund the development, and on 26 August 1895, Joly filed a patent application for a camera that could provide films both for a projector and for the Kinetoscope. The camera used a mechanical movement similar to that in the Demenÿ system, and utilized perforated film which could be advanced on mechanical sprockets. He made his first moving picture, titled Le Bain d'une Mondaine in September–October of that year. On 8 October 1895 Joly filed a patent for another machine, the "Photozootrope", which was essentially a large Kinetoscope with four eyepieces. He sold a few units, but did not achieve major success with this development.

Pathé realized the commercial possibility of Joly's camera, and in 1896 he dissolved his agreement with Joly. He managed to secure the rights to the camera and the film process, going on to great success in the motion picture world. During 1896 Joly filed three other patent applications: the first for another camera; the second for a method of eliminating "flicker" from the projected image; and the third for a method of adding the perception of depth to the filmed image. During the final years of the decade Joly teamed with a French businessman and engineer, Ernest Normandin, to make and exhibit motion pictures. The process, officially called Joly-Normandin but also billed first as Cinematographe Joly, and then as Royal Biograph, was being exhibited at the Bazar de la Charité in 1897 when a disastrous fire (caused by a Molteni ether lamp) occurred. It was later exhibited in England (at the Empire in Leicester Square), and in Ireland (billed as "Professor Jolly's Cinematograph").

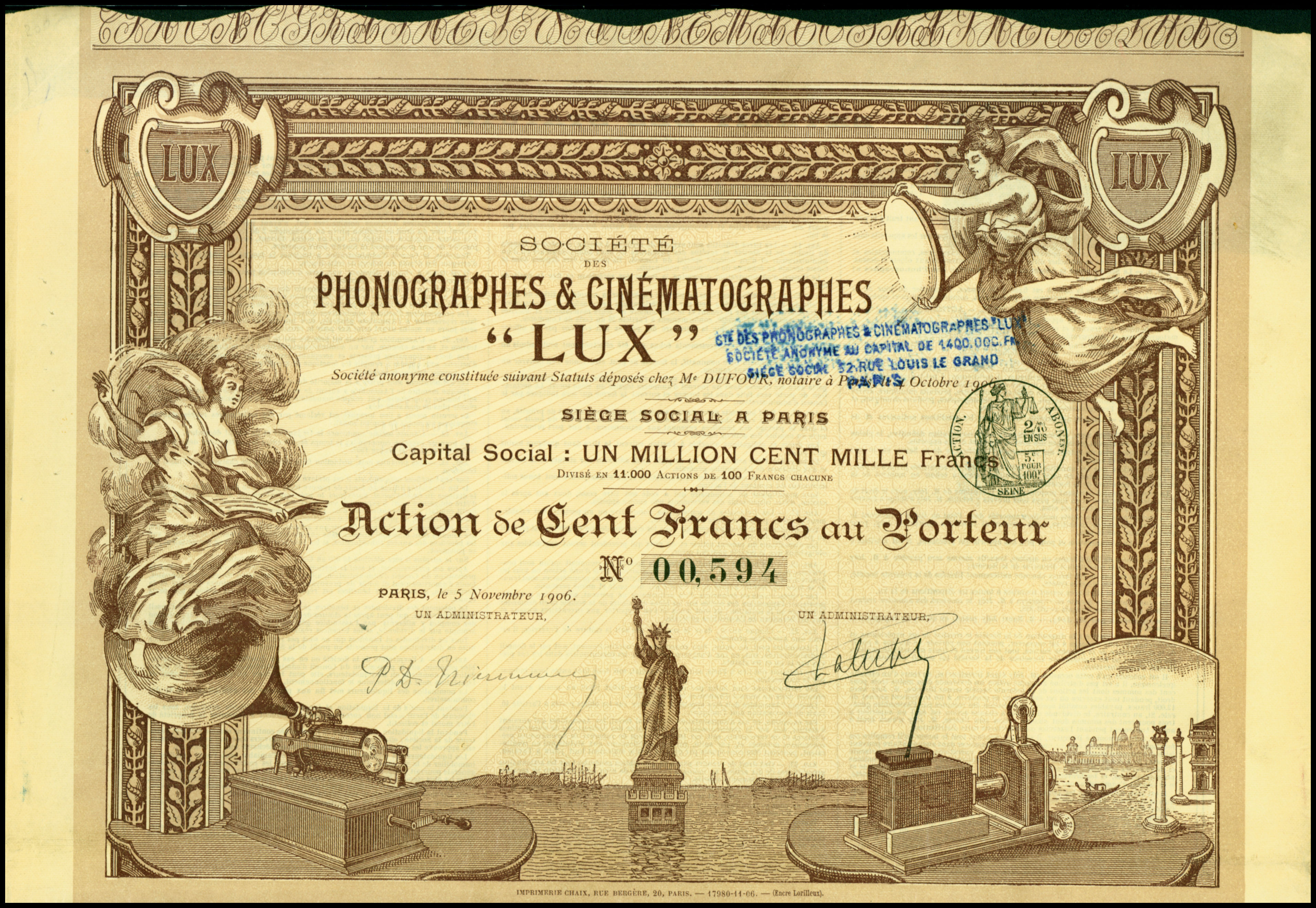
Share of the Société des Phonographes et Cinématographes Lux, issued 5. November 1906

In 1900 Joly entered a three-way partnership with Normandin and his brother Edgar, called "Société du Biophonographe", to exploit a system of synchronizing a motion picture projection with sound from a phonograph. The company filmed and marketed several films, but declared insolvency in 1902. Joly sold the rights to his patents to Georges Mendel, who continued developing them into a commercially viable talking film. Joly created another company in 1906, the Société des Phonographes et Cinématographes Lux, which produced several short films. He left the company in 1908 after disagreements with other principals, continuing his research alone.

One line of research into recording sound for films involved a beam light reflected from a mirror which vibrated in response to sound waves. He had formulated the concept in 1905, but was never able to develop the machines necessary for its utilization. Unable to achieve commercial success, he supported himself by working in various manufacturing plants. By the time of his death in 1945 in Paris, he was a night watchman, and died unnoticed and destitute.
