= Kinoton =

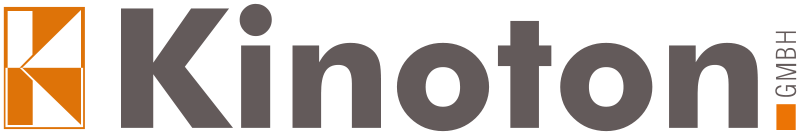
- Company type: GmbH
- Industry: Digital Projection Systems, Film Technology
- Founded: 1948
- Headquarters: Germering, Germany
- Key people: Renate Zoller, Christoph Dobler
- Website: www.kinoton.com

Kinoton GmbH was a German manufacturer of digital projection equipment, conventional film equipment, studio systems, and 360° LED display systems. It was based in Germering near Munich, with branches in Berlin, Hamburg and Neuss, and service centers throughout Germany and Austria. Via an international distribution and service network, the company served customers worldwide. In 2010, Kinoton was picked by the German business periodical Manager Magazin to join the list of "Germany’s 1,000 World Market Leaders".

Kinoton GmbH has been in liquidation since April 1, 2014. The Kinoton brand will live on as a new company, Kinoton Digital Solutions, which will focus on digital services.

== History ==
Kinoton was founded in Munich in 1948 to provide services to local movie theaters. The following year, the company obtained the rights to distribute film projectors made by the Dutch Philips company. In 1963, Kinoton launched the first projector that it had developed in-house. It was followed in 1968 by the ST 200, the world’s first non-rewind film platter system. The subsequent decades were marked by rapid growth. In the 1980s, Kinoton expanded its portfolio by starting to develop, manufacture, and sell projectors and other equipment for film and post-production studios. In 2000, it also began developing and producing D-Cinema services.

In 1988 and 2004, Kinoton received the Scientific and Engineering Award by the Academy of Motion Picture Arts and Sciences: in 1988 for developing the first film platter system, and in 2004 for developing the high-speed FP 30 EC II und FP 38 EC II projectors.
