= Raoul Grimoin-Sanson =

Raoul Grimoin-Sanson (1860–1941) was an inventor in the field of early cinema. He was born in Elbeuf, as Raoul Grimoin; he added the surname Sanson later. He had an early interest in stage magic as well as photography.

In the 1890s, Grimoin-Sanson began experiments in moving pictures, and desired to project films, like those from Thomas Edison's kinetoscope, on screen. In 1896, he invented a crude camera/projector combination called the Phototachygraphe. In 1897, he patented the Cinéorama, a panoramic film projection system involving ten synchronized projectors. The Cinéorama was demonstrated at the 1900 Exposition Universelle in Paris, but problems with heat from the projectors caused it to be shut down. Despite the failure of his Cinéorama company and of later film work, in the 1920s Grimoin-Sanson would attempt to claim to be one of the major pioneers of film, alongside Marey and the Lumières.

== Bibliography ==
- Laurent Mannoni. "Raoul Grimoin-Sanson". Who's Who of Victorian Cinema.
- Kenneth MacGowan (Spring 1957). "The Wide Screen of Yesterday and Tomorrow". The Quarterly of Film Radio and Television. 11 (3): 217–241. doi:10.1525/fq.1957.11.3.04a00020 (inactive 12 July 2025).
