= List of compositions by César Cui =

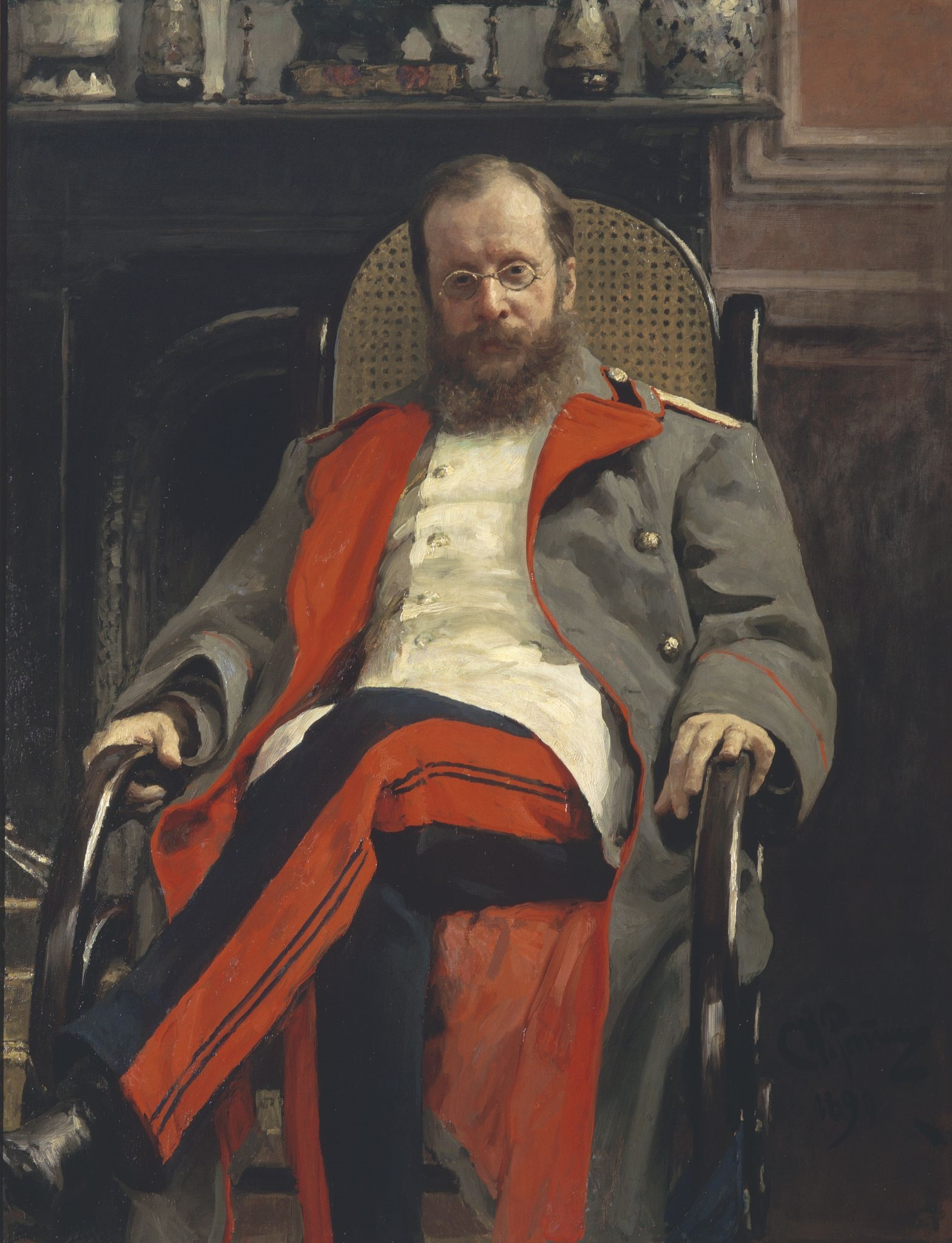
Portrait of César Cui by Ilya Repin, 1890, Tretyakov Gallery, Moscow

The following is a list of compositions by the Russian composer César Cui.

- Titles of overall works are supplied in English unless the non-Russian original is distinctive in some way. Russian titles are added where helpful and applicable. Years in parentheses refer to the composition dates, not publishing dates.
- Complete listings of individual numbers within a larger work are not given, although certain well-known or recorded selections are cited. For important selections within an opera, go to the Wikipedia article for that opera, listed below and on the Wikipedia category-page for Cui's operas.
- Many individual compositions by Cui (primarily songs and choral pieces) have been published over the years, especially in English and French editions, without information as to opus number, if any. In order to avoid inaccuracy and unnecessary clutter, only those pieces that verifiably do not belong to an opus are included below along with the works with established opus numbers.

(Note: Cui's compositions, especially from the end of his life, remain in manuscript in the Russian National Library; likewise with the full orchestral scores of several of the operas. The recent publications of the last of Cui's instrumental works (Opp. 104–106) has addressed the research gap in his unknown works.)

== Opera ==
=== Serious or tragic opera ===
- Prisoner of the Caucasus (1857–1858, 1881–1882, 1885)
- William Ratcliff (1861–1868)
- Mlada (collaborative work of "The Five"), Act I (1872)
- Angelo (1871–1875)
- The Saracen (1896–1898)
- Feast in Time of Plague (1900)
- Mademoiselle Fifi (1902–1903)
- Mateo Falcone (1906–1907)
- The Captain's Daughter (1907–1909)

=== Comic or light opera ===
- The Mandarin's Son (1859)
- Le flibustier (1888–1889)

=== Children's opera ===
- The Snow-Bogatyr (1905)
- Little Red Riding Hood (1911)
- Puss in Boots (1913)
- Ivan the Fool (1913)

=== Completion of operas begun by others ===
- The Stone Guest (Dargomyzhsky) (Introduction and end of Tableau 1)
- The Fair at Sorochyntsi (Mussorgsky)

== Choral ==
A cappella unless otherwise marked.

=== Sacred choral ===
- Ave Maria, Op. 34, for 1-2 women's voices with piano or harmonium (1886)
- Three Psalms, Op. 80, for mixed voices (1910)
- Song of the Most Holy Theotokos [Песнь Пресвятыя Богородицы = Pesn' presvjatyja bogorodicy] (i.e. the Russian Orthodox Magnificat), Op. 93, for soprano solo and mixed voices (1914)

=== Secular choral and part-song ===
- Two Choruses to Words by Pushkin, Op. 4, for mixed voices with orchestra (1860)
- Chorus mysticus trium vocum muliebrium (Mystical Chorus) [Мистический хор = Mističeskij khor], op. 6, for women's voices and orchestra or piano, text from Dante's Purgatorio (1871)
- Seven Choruses, Op. 28, for mixed voices (1885)
- Les oiseaux d'Argenteau, for children's voices (1887)
- Five Choruses, Op. 46, for mixed voices (1893)
- Six Choruses, Op. 53, for mixed voices (1895)
- Seven Little Duet-Choruses, Op. 101, for children's or women's voices, (1899) (not published)
- Zwei Lieder, op. 58, for men's voices (1901)
- Seven Vocal Quartets, Op. 59, for mixed voices (1901)
- Six Choruses, Op. 63, for mixed voices (1903)
- Seven Little Choruses on texts by Belousov, Op. 77 (1908)
- Thirteen Choruses, Op. 85, for women's and children's voices with piano (1911)
- Nine Vocal Quartets, Op. 88, for men's voices (1911–1912)
- March of the Russian Falcons [Марш русских соколов = Marsh russkikh sokolov], for mixed voices with piano (1912)
- Cantata in Commemoration of the 300th Anniversary of the Reign of the House of the Romanovs, 1613–1913, Op. 89, for mixed voices with orchestra or piano (1913)
- Your Poetic Art [Твой стих = Tvoj stikh], Cantata in Memory of M.Yu. Lermontov, Op. 96, for mixed voices with orchestra or piano (1914)
- They're Marching ["Идут" = "Idut"], for men's voices (1914)

== Orchestral and band music ==
=== Orchestra ===
(Note: most of the orchestral works were issued also in arrangements for piano four-hands.)

- Scherzo No. 1, based on the letters B.A.B.E.G and C.C., Op. 1 (1857) (originally for piano 4-hands)
- Scherzo No. 2, "à la Schumann", Op. 2 (1857) (originally for piano 4-hands)
- Tarantelle, Op. 12 (1858) (also adapted for piano by Franz Liszt)
- Marche solennelle, Op. 18 (1881)
- Suite-miniature (Suite No. 1), Op. 20; orchestration of nos. 10, 4, 5, 6, 8, and 12 from original piano version
- Suite No. 2, Op. 38 (1887)
- Suite No. 4, à Argenteau (1887); orchestration (by Alexander Glazunov) of nos. 1, 5, 4, 8, and 9 from the original piano version
- In modo populari: Petite Suite No. 3, Op. 43 (1890)
- Waltz, Op. 65 (1904)
- Three Scherzos, Op. 82 (1910)

=== Soloist with orchestra ===
(also available with piano accompaniment)

- Deux morceaux pour violon avec accompagnement d'orchestre ou de piano, Op. 24, (1884 publ., 1880) score at Sibley Music Library Digital Scores Collection
- Suite concertante pour le violon avec accompagnement d'orchestre ou de piano, Op. 25, for violin, (1884) score at Sibley Music Library Digital Scores Collection
- Two Pieces, Op. 36, for cello (1886)

=== Band ===
- Glory [Слава = Slava], march for military wind orchestra (1915).

== Chamber music ==
- Petite suite for piano and violin, Op. 14 (1879, publ. 1890), score at Sibley Music Library Digital Scores Collection
- Twelve Miniatures for violin and piano, Op. 20 (1882), also for piano solo
- Deux Morceaux for violin and piano, Op. 24 score at Sibley Music Library Digital Scores Collection
- Suite concertante for violin, Op. 25 (1884) score at Sibley Music Library Digital Scores Collection
- Two Pieces for cello, Op. 36 (1886)
- Six/Seven Miniatures for violin and piano, Op. 39 (1886), also for piano solo
- Kaleidoscope: 24 pieces for violin and piano, Op. 50 (1893), score at Sibley Music Library Digital Scores Collection
  - No. 9, "Orientale" ([http://nla.gov.au/nla.mus-an14448987 External link to public-domain sheet music]
- String Quartet [No. 1], Op. 45 (1890)
- Six bagatelles for violin and piano, Op. 51 (1894) partial score at Sibley Music Library Digital Scores Collection&
- Tarantelle for violin and piano (1893)
- Cinq petite duos for flute, violin and piano, Op. 56 (1897)
- String Quartet No. 2, Op. 68 (1907)
- Barcarolle for cello and piano, Op. 81 (1910)
- Sonata for piano and violin, Op. 84 (c. 1860–1870; published 1911)
- String Quartet No. 3, Op. 91 (1913)
- Scherzetto for flute and piano (1916)

== Solo vocal ==
(For voice and piano unless otherwise noted.)

=== Art songs and duets ===
- Three Romances, Op. 3, (1856–1857) (Includes one duet)
- I remember an evening [Я помню вечер = Ja pomnju večer] (1857)
- Six Romances, Op. 5, (1857–1861)
- From my tears [Из слез моих = Iz slez moikh] (1858)
- Six Romances, Op. 7 (1867–1869); includes:
  - 2. What I dream about secretly in the quiet of night [О чем в тиши ночей таинственно мечтаю = O čem v tiši nočej tainstvenno mečtaju]
  - 3. Aeolian harps: "A drought... the air sleeps" [Эоловы арфи: "Засуха... Воздух спит" = 'Eolovy arfi: "Zasukha... vozdukh spit"]
- Six Romances, Op. 9 (1870–1874)
- Six Romances, Op. 10 (1870–1876); includes:
  - 3. It was getting dark, the torrid day imperceptibly grows pale [Смеркалось, жаркий день бледнел неуловимо = Smerkalos', žarkij den' blednel neulovimo]
- Six Romances, Op. 11 (1877)
  - 2. Moja pieszczotka [Моя баловница = Moja balovnica]
- Six Romances, Op. 13 (1878)
- Six Romances, Op. 16 (1879)
- Bolero, Op. 17, for soprano voice with piano or orchestra (1881)
- Seven Romances and Duets, Op. 19 (1881)
- Six Mélodies, Op. 23 (1884)
- Six Romances, Op. 27 (1884)
- Septain (1885)
- Sept Mélodies, Op. 32 (1886)
- Seven Poems of A. Pushkin and M. Lermontov, Op. 33 (1885–1886)
  - 3. I loved you [Я вас любил = Ja vas ljubil]
  - 4. The burnt letter: "Farewell, love-letter, farewell" [Сожженное письмо : "Прощай, письмо любви, прощай" = Sožženoe pis'mo: " Proščaj, pis'mo ljubvi, proščaj"]
- Drei Lieder, Op. 37 (1886)
- Les adieux de Guyot-Dessaigne: Lamento (1889)
- Les deux ménétriers, Op. 42 (1890); also orchestrated
- Vingt poèmes de Jean Richepin, Op. 44 (1890); includes:
  - 1. Berceuse : "Dors, mon fieux, dors"
  - 5. Le ciel est transi
  - 12. Le hun : "Vole, o cavale folle!"
  - 19. Les Songeants : "Dans le pays on les appelait les Songeants"
- Four Romances, Op. 47 (1892) (manuscript as of 1894; never published?)
- Cztery sonety (= Four Sonnets), Op. 48 (1892)
- Seven Romances, Op. 49 (1889–1892); includes:
  - 1. I touched a flower [Коснулась я цветка
  - 3. A cloudlet: "A storm-cloudlet rushed by over the field" [Тучка: "Пронеслась над полем тучка грозовая" = Tučka: "Proneslas' nad polem tučka grozovaja"]
  - 5. Walsingham's hymn: "When mighty winter" [Гимн Вальсингама: "Когда могучая зима" = Gimn Val'singama: "Kogda mogučaja zima"] (incorporated later into the opera Feast in Time of Plague)
  - 6. Why is it, my darling [Отчего это, милая = Otčego 'eto, milaja]
- Cinq mélodies pour chant et piano, Op. 54 (ca. 1890 or 1895?); includes:
  - 5. Ici bas tous les lilas meurent
- Eight Romances, Op. 55 ca. 1890; includes
  - 2. Mary's song: "There was a time" [Песня Мэри: "Было время" = Pesnja M'eri: "Bylo vremja"] (incorporated later into the opera Feast in Time of Plague)
- 25 Poems by Pushkin [25 стихотворений Пушкина = 25 stikhotvoreniy puškina], Op. 57 (1899); includes:
  - 4. It's all over [Все кончено = Vse končeno]
  - 7. The statue at Tsarskoye Selo: "Having dropped an urn of water" [Царскосельская статуя: "Урну с водой уронив" = Carskosel'skaja statuja: "Urnu s vodoj uroniv"]
  - 11. Thou and you: "The empty 'you' with the heartfelt 'thou'" [Ты и вы : "Пустое вы, сердечным ты" = Ty i vy: "Pustoe vy, serdečnym ty"]
  - 25. Desire: "Slowly my days drag on" [Желание: "Медлительно влекутся дни мои" = Želanie: "Medlitel'no vlekutsja dni moi"]
- Szesc piesni [Six Polish songs] (1902)
- Twenty-One Poems of N. A. Nekrasov, Op. 62 (1902) (No. 21 is for mixed voices a cappella)
- Echos of War 1904–1905: ten romances, op. 66 (1904–1905); includes:
  - 4. Spring-Beauty: "A wandering pilgrim met" (a bylina) [Весна-красна: "Повстречал перехожий калика" (былина) = Vesna-krasna: "Povstrečal perekhožij kalika" (bylina)] (also with orchestral accompaniment)
- Eighteen Poems of A. K. Tolstoy, Op. 67 (1904); includes:
  - 1. Oh, if Mother-Volga started to run backwards [Ой, кабы Волга-матушка да вспять побежала = Oj, kaby Volga-matuška spjat' pobežala]
- Six Poems of A. Mickiewicz, Op. 71 (1907)
- Neuf mélodies, Op. 72 (ca. 1906–1910)
- Seven Poems of Armenian Poets, Op. 75 (1907)
  - 3. A dream: "I heard a mellifluous melody" [Сон : "Я услышал напев сладкозвучный = "Son: Ja uslyšal napev sladkosvučnyj"]
- Six Poems of Ya.P. Polonsky, Op. 76 (1908)
- Twenty-Four Poems, Op. 86 (by 1913); includes:
  - 4. Es blasen die blauen Husaren
  - 24. In memory of V.V. Stasov: "No, he is not dead! No!" [Памяти В.В. Стасова: "Нет, он не умер! Нет!" = Pamjati V.V. Stasova: "Net, on ne umer! Net!"]
- Musical Miniatures, Humoresques, [and] Letters, Op. 87 (1913)
- Five Fables of I. Krylov, Op. 90 (1913)
- Strike the Teuton [Вейте тевтона = Bejte tevtona] (1914)
- Trzech Budrysów: ballada [Budrys and his sons: ballade], Op. 98, for solo voice and orchestra, Op. 98 (1915) (also with piano accompaniment)
- Six Songs of the Western Slavs by A. S. Pushkin (based on Cuzla by Prosper Mérimée), Op. 99, for voice and symphony orchestra (1915) (also with piano accompaniment)
- "La bataille" [date unknown].

=== Children's songs ===
- Thirteen Musical Pictures, Op. 15, for voice and piano (1877–1878); includes:
  - 6. Christ is Risen: "Everywhere the ringing of church bells is droning" [Христос воскрес: "Повсюду благовесть гудит"]
- Seventeen Children's Songs, Op. 73 (1907)
- Seventeen More Children's Songs, Op. 78 (1909–1910)
- Last Seventeen Children's Songs, Op. 97 (1914–1915)

== Keyboard instrument ==
=== Solo piano (two-hands) ===
- Three Pieces, Op. 8 (1877)
- Twelve Miniatures, Op. 20 (1882); also arranged for violin and piano, [http://hdl.handle.net/1802/4270 score at Sibley Music Library Digital Scores Collection]; selections later orchestrated as orchestral Suite No. 1.
- Suite, Op. 21 (1883); (dedicated to Liszt)
- Four Pieces, Op. 22 (1883)
- Valse-Caprice, Op. 26 (1883)
- Deux Bluettes, Op. 29 (1886)
- Two Polonaises, Op. 30 (1886)
- Three Waltzes, Op. 31 (1886)
- Three Impromptus, Op. 35 (1886)
- Six/Seven Miniatures, Op. 39 (1886); also arranged for violin and piano] (1880), [http://hdl.handle.net/1802/4271 score at Sibley Music Library Digital Scores Collection]
- À Argenteau, collection of 9 characteristic pieces, Op. 40 (1887); 5 selections orchestrated as Suite No. 4
- Trois mouvements de valse, Op. 41 (1888)
- Petite prélude [no. 1] (1888) (later arranged for violin and piano as No. 17 of Kaleidoscope, Op. 50)
- Petite prélude no. 2 (1889)
- Five Pieces, Op. 52 (1895)
- Impromptu-caprice (1896?).
- Four Pieces, Op. 60 (1901)
- Theme and Variations, Op. 61 (1901)
- Twenty-Five Preludes, Op. 64 (1904)
- Two Mazurkas, Op. 70 (1907)
- Three Mazurkas, Op. 79 (1909)
- Five Pieces, Op. 83 (1911); includes:
  - 5. Rêverie d'un faune, après la lecture de son journal
- Trois esquisses mélodiques, Op. 92 (1913)
- Trois mouvements de danse, Op. 94 (1914)
- Five Pieces, Op. 95 (1914)
- Eighteen Variations, Op. 100 (1916) (manuscript; not published)
- Thème et variations. Prelude pour piano, op. 104 (1916) (manuscript; not published)
- Petite sonatine, Op. 106 (1916) (manuscript; not published)
- Three pieces ("from the last years", published in 1952 in a Soviet edition)

=== One or two pianos, four-hands ===
- Scherzo No. 1, based on the letters B.A.B.E.G and C.C., Op. 1 (1857) (later orchestrated)
- Scherzo No. 2, "à la Schumann", Op. 2 (1857) (later orchestrated)
- Contributions of 5 variations and a waltz to the Paraphrases, a collection of pieces by Borodin, Cui, Liadov, Liszt, Rimsky-Korsakov, and Nikolai Vladimirovich Shcherbachov (originally published in 1879, with pieces added later to total 24 variations and 17 other pieces); the two-finger theme of this work is known also as "Tati-tati" or a version of "Chopsticks"
- Three pieces, Op. 69 (1907) (2 pianos)
- Ten Five-Finger Pieces, Op. 74 (1906?)

=== Organ or harmonium ===
- Prelude in G minor (1913)
- Prelude in A-flat Major (1913)

== Works by opus number (abbreviated) ==
- Op. 1, Scherzo No. 1, based on the letters B.A.B.E.G and C.C.
- Op. 2, Scherzo No. 2, "à la Schumann"
- Op. 3, Three Romances
- Op. 4, Two Choruses to Words by Pushkin,
- Op. 5, Six Romances
- Op. 6, Chorus mysticus trium vocum muliebrium (Mystical Chorus)
- Op. 7, Six Romances
- Op. 8, Three Pieces (piano)
- Op. 9, Six Romances
- Op. 10, Six Romances
- Op. 11, Six Romances
- Op. 12, Tarantelle, Op. 12 (orchestra)
- Op. 13, Six Romances
- Op. 14, Petite suite (violin)
- Op. 15, Thirteen Musical Pictures (voice)
- Op. 16, Six Romances
- Op. 17, Bolero (voice)
- Op. 18, Marche solennelle (orchestra)
- Op. 19, Seven Romances and Duets
- Op. 20, Twelve Miniatures (piano or violin/piano) = Suite-miniature (= Suite No. 1, orchestra))
- Op. 21, Suite (piano)
- Op. 22, Four Pieces (piano)
- Op. 23, Six Mélodies
- Op. 24, Deux morceaux (violin)
- Op. 25, Suite concertante (violin)
- Op. 26, Valse-Caprice (piano)
- Op. 27, Six Romances
- Op. 28, Seven Choruses
- Op. 29, Deux Bluettes (piano)
- Op. 30, Two Polonaises (piano)
- Op. 31, Three Waltzes (piano)
- Op. 32, Sept Mélodies
- Op. 33, Seven Poems of A. Pushkin and M. Lermontov
- Op. 34, "Ave Maria"
- Op. 35, Three Impromptus (piano)
- Op. 36, Two Pieces (violoncello)
- Op. 37, Drei Lieder
- Op. 38, Suite No. 2 (orchestra)
- Op. 39, Six/Seven Miniatures (piano or violin/piano)
- Op. 40, À Argenteau (piano) = Suite No. 4 (orchestra)
- Op. 41, Trois mouvements de valse (piano)
- Op. 42, Les deux ménétriers (voice)
- Op. 43, "In modo populari": Petite Suite No. 3 (orchestra)
- Op. 44, Vingt poèmes de Jean Richepin
- Op. 45, String Quartet [No. 1]
- Op. 46, Five Choruses
- Op. 47, Four Romances
- Op. 48, Cztery sonety
- Op. 49, Seven Romances
- Op. 50, Kaleidoscope: 24 pieces (violin)
- Op. 51, Six Bagatelles (violin)
- Op. 52, Five Pieces (piano)
- Op. 53, Six Choruses
- Op. 54, Cinq mélodies
- Op. 55, Eight Romances
- Op. 56, Cinq petite duos (flute, violin)
- Op. 57, 25 Poems by Pushkin
- Op. 58, Zwei Lieder (men's voices)
- Op. 59, Seven Vocal Quartets
- Op. 60, Four Pieces (piano)
- Op. 61, Theme and Variations (piano)
- Op. 62, Twenty-One Poems of N.A. Nekrasov
- Op. 63, Six Choruses
- Op. 64, Twenty-Five Preludes (piano)
- Op. 65, Waltz (orchestra)
- Op. 66, Echos of War 1904–1905: ten romances
- Op. 67, Eighteen Poems of A.K. Tolstoy
- Op. 68, String Quartet No. 2
- Op. 69, Three pieces (2 pianos, 4 hands)
- Op. 70, Two Mazurkas (piano)
- Op. 71, Six Poems of A. Mickiewicz
- Op. 72, Neuf mélodies
- Op. 73, Seventeen Children's Songs
- Op. 74, Ten Five-Finger Pieces (piano, 4 hands)
- Op. 75, Seven Poems of Armenian Poets
- Op. 76, Six Poems of Ya.P. Polonsky
- Op. 77, Seven Little Choruses on texts by Belousov,
- Op. 78, Seventeen More Children's Songs
- Op. 79, Three Mazurkas (piano)
- Op. 80, Three Psalms
- Op. 81, Barcarolle (violoncello)
- Op. 82, Three Scherzos (orchestra)
- Op. 83, Five Pieces (piano)
- Op. 84, Sonata (violin)
- Op. 85, Thirteen Choruses
- Op. 86, Twenty-Four Poems
- Op. 87, Musical Miniatures, Humoresques, [and] Letters (voice)
- Op. 88, Nine Vocal Quartets
- Op. 89, Cantata in Commemoration of the Three-Hundredth Anniversary of the Reign of the House of the Romanovs, 1613–1913,
- Op. 90, Five Fables of I. Krylov
- Op. 91, String Quartet No. 3
- Op. 92, Trois esquisses mélodiques (piano)
- Op. 93, Song of the Most Holy Theotokos
- Op. 94, Trois mouvements de danse (piano)
- Op. 95, Five Pieces (piano)
- Op. 96, Your Poetic Art [Твой стих = Tvoj stikh], Cantata in Memory of M.Yu. Lermontov
- Op. 97, Last Seventeen Children's Songs
- Op. 98, Trzech Budrysów: ballada
- Op. 99, *Six Songs of the Western Slavs by A.S. Pushkin
- Op. 100, unknown
- Op. 101, Seven Little Duet-Choruses
- Op. 102, [unverified]
- Op. 103, [unverified]
- Op. 104, Thème et variations-preludes pour piano
- Op. 105, 17 Miniatures (15 have survived)
- Op. 106, Petite sonatine (piano)

== Chronological list of works without opus number ==
- I Remember an Evening (1857)
- Prisoner of the Caucasus (1857–1858, 1881–1882, 1885)
- From My Tears (1858)
- The Mandarin's Son (1859)
- William Ratcliff (1861–1868)
- The Stone Guest (Introduction and end of Tableau 1)
- Angelo (1871–1875)
- Mlada (collaborative work of "The Five"), Act I (1872)
- Contributions of five variations and a waltz to the Paraphrases (originally published in 1879)
- Septain (1885) (voice)
- Les oiseaux d'Argenteau, for children's voices (1887)
- Le flibustier (1888–1889)
- Petite prélude No. 1 (1888)
- Petite prélude No. 2 (1889)
- Les adieux de Guyot-Dessaigne: Lamento (1889)
- Tarantelle, for violin and piano (1893)
- Impromptu-caprice (1896?)
- The Saracen (1896–1898)
- A Feast in Time of Plague (1900)
- Szesc piesni (Six Polish songs) (1902)
- Mademoiselle Fifi (1902–1903)
- The Snow Bogatyr (1905)
- Mateo Falcone (1906–1907)
- The Captain's Daughter (1907–1909)
- Little Red Riding Hood (1911)
- March of the Russian Falcons (1912)
- Ivan the Fool (1913)
- Prelude in G minor (1913)
- Prelude in A-flat major (1913)
- Puss in Boots (1913)
- Strike the Teuton (1914)
- They're Marching, for men's voices (1914)
- Glory (1915).
- Scherzetto, for flute and piano (1916)
- The Fair at Sorochyntsi (Mussorgsky)
- Three pieces for piano, "from the last years" (published in 1952)
- La bataille (date unknown)
- Perpetuum mobile (Perpetual Motion) (date unknown)

== Bibliography ==
The above list was compiled from many sources, including exemplars of most of the printed scores themselves. Some of the more important existing lists of Cui's works are contained in the following, although each has its own limitations:

- Findeizen, Nikolai Feodorovich. "Библиографический указатель музыкальных произведений и критических статей Ц.А.Кюи" [Bibliographic List of Musical Compositions and Critical Articles by C. A. Cui], Артист [Moscow], nos. 34, 35 (1894), pp. 16–28, 34-44.
- Neef, Sigrid. Die Russischen Fünf: Balakirew, Borodin, Cui, Mussorgski, Rimski-Korsakow. Berlin: E. Kuhn, 1992.
- Norris, Geoffrey and Neff, Lyle. "Cui, César [Kyui, Tsezar' Antonovich]," Grove Music Online. Ed. L. Macy.
- Прижизненные издания произведений Композиторов “Могучей кучки”, хранящиеся в Государственной публичной библиотека имени М.Е. Салтыкова-Щедрина: каталог. [Editions of Compositions by "The Mighty Handful" Published in Their Lifetimes, Kept in the M.E. Saltykov-Shchedrin State Public Library: A Catalog.] Ленинград: Гос. публичная библиотека им. М.Е. Салтыкова-Щедрина, 1990.

Other information on identifying and dating Cui's works can be found in these sources:

- Cui, César. Избранные письма [Selected Letters]. Ленинград: Гос. муз. изд-во, 1955.
- Mercy-Argenteau, La Comtesse de. César Cui: esquisse critique. Paris: Fischbacher, 1888.
