= Mateo Falcone (opera) =

Opera by César Cui

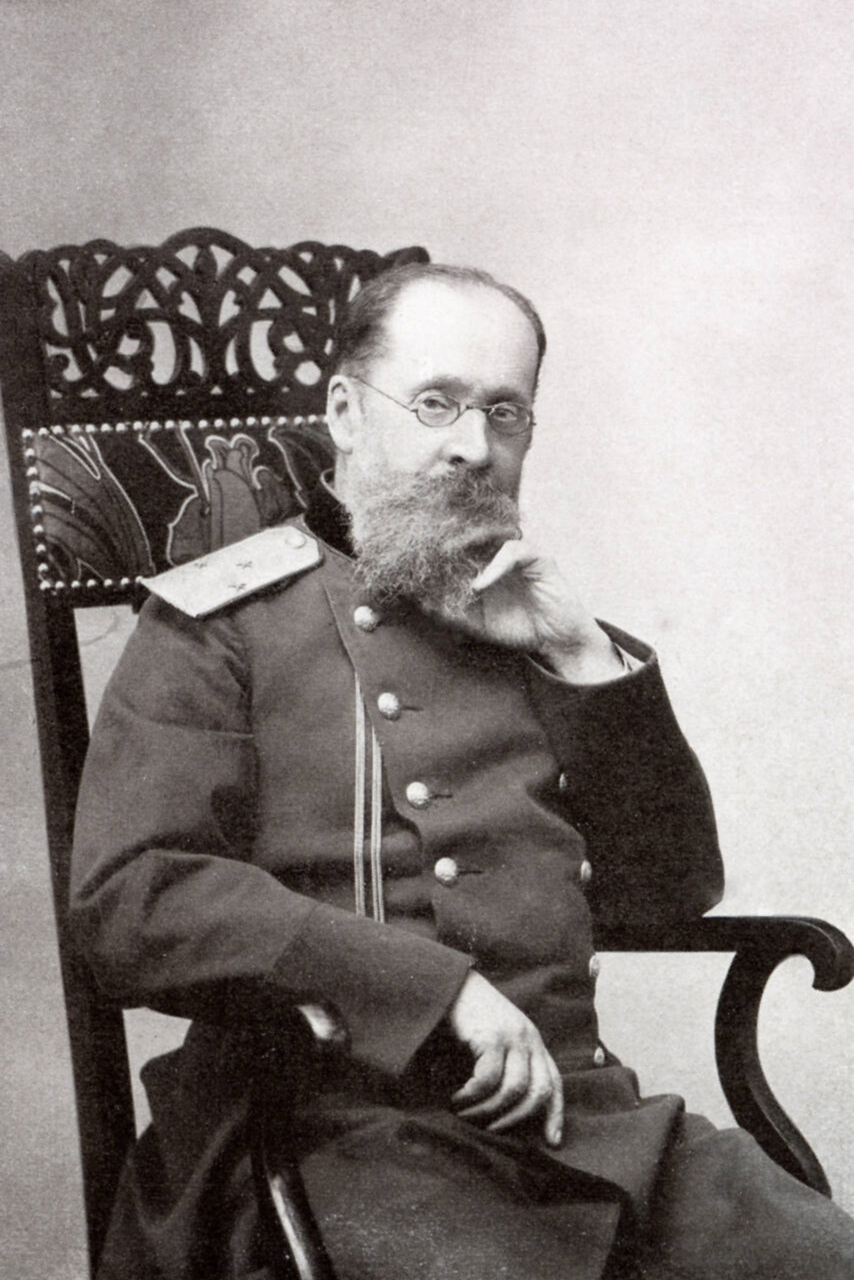
Composer César Cui

Mateo Falcone (Russian: Матео Фальконе, romanized: Mateo Fal'kone) is a one-act opera composed by César Cui during 1906–1907. (Actually, Cui designated the genre of this work as "dramatic scene.") The libretto was adapted by the composer from Prosper Mérimée's like-named story from 1829 and Vasily Zhukovsky's verse rendering thereof. It was premiered on 14 December 1907 (Old Style), at the Bolshoi Theatre in Moscow (the work was given along with the composer's early one-act comic opera, The Mandarin's Son). The premiere production of Mateo was a failure; the work never became part of the standard operatic repertoire in Russia, and seems never to have been performed again.

== Background ==
This opera constitutes the last of three short serious operas by this composer, the other two being A Feast in Time of Plague and Mademoiselle Fifi.

The musical setting of the text of Mateo Falcone has a declamatory-melodic character, in keeping with the composer's veneration, if not slavish emulation, of Alexander Dargomyzhsky's method of "melodic recitative," which had been most thoroughly demonstrated in The Stone Guest. There are no extractable "numbers" from this opera to speak of, although highlights include the orchestral passages that suggest the rustic scenery with a kind of barcarolle, and the intimate Latin prayer near the end (a setting of "Ave Maria"), which is reminiscent of the composer's art songs.

== Characters and setting ==
- Mateo Falcone: baritone
- Giuseppa, his wife: soprano
- Fredrick, a Corsican carpenter baritone
- Fortunato, their son: alto
- Sanpiero, a smuggler: tenor
- Gamba, a sergeant: bass
- A few soldiers [i.e., gendarmes]: tenors and basses

Setting: Corsica, 1800s

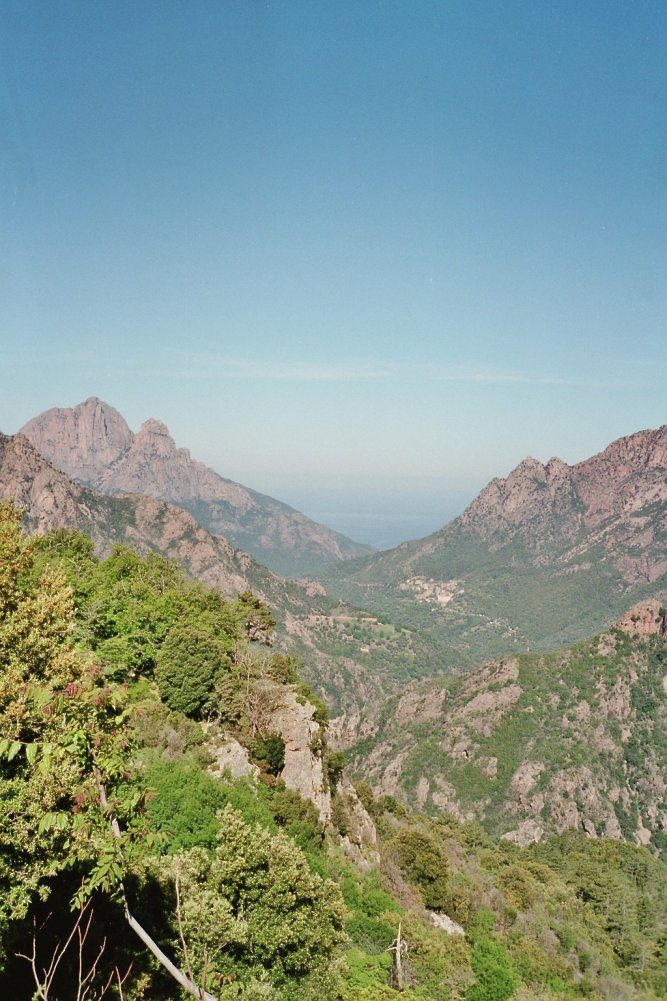
A view of the rugged landscape of Corsica

== Synopsis ==
The boy Fortunato is outside of his family's house, playing a horn while his parents are away. Shots ring out in the distance, and Sanpiero runs in, wounded. Fleeing the police, he asks Fortunato to hide him. Fortunato asks for and gets some money in return, and hides Sanpiero, the smuggler.

The police arrive, led by Gamba, who is a distant cousin of Mateo. They search the house and try to get information out of Fortunato, who resists with juvenile evasions until Gamba tempts the boy with an enamel-encased watch. Fortunato takes the bribe and reveals Sanpiero.

Mateo and his wife return. After Gamba tells them of their son's help in capturing Sanpiero, the wounded man curses the Falcone household for betrayal as he is carried away. Mateo has only one thing to do to preserve the honor of his family: he takes his son away from the house, says prayers with him, and kills him with a single gunshot.

== Bibliography ==
- César Cui. Матео Фальконе: драматическая сцена (по Меримэ и Жуковского). Фортепианное переложение с пением. [Mateo Falcone: dramatic scene (after Mérimée and Zhukovsky). Piano-vocal score.] Москва: П. Юргенсон, 1907.
