= A Feast in Time of Plague (disambiguation) =

A Feast in Time of Plague is an 1830 play by Aleksandr Pushkin.

A Feast in Time of Plague may also refer to:

- A Feast in Time of Plague (Cui opera), a 1900 opera by César Cui
- A Feast in the Time of Plague (Woolf opera), a 2020 opera by Alex Woolf
