= The Snow Bogatyr =

Opera by César Cui

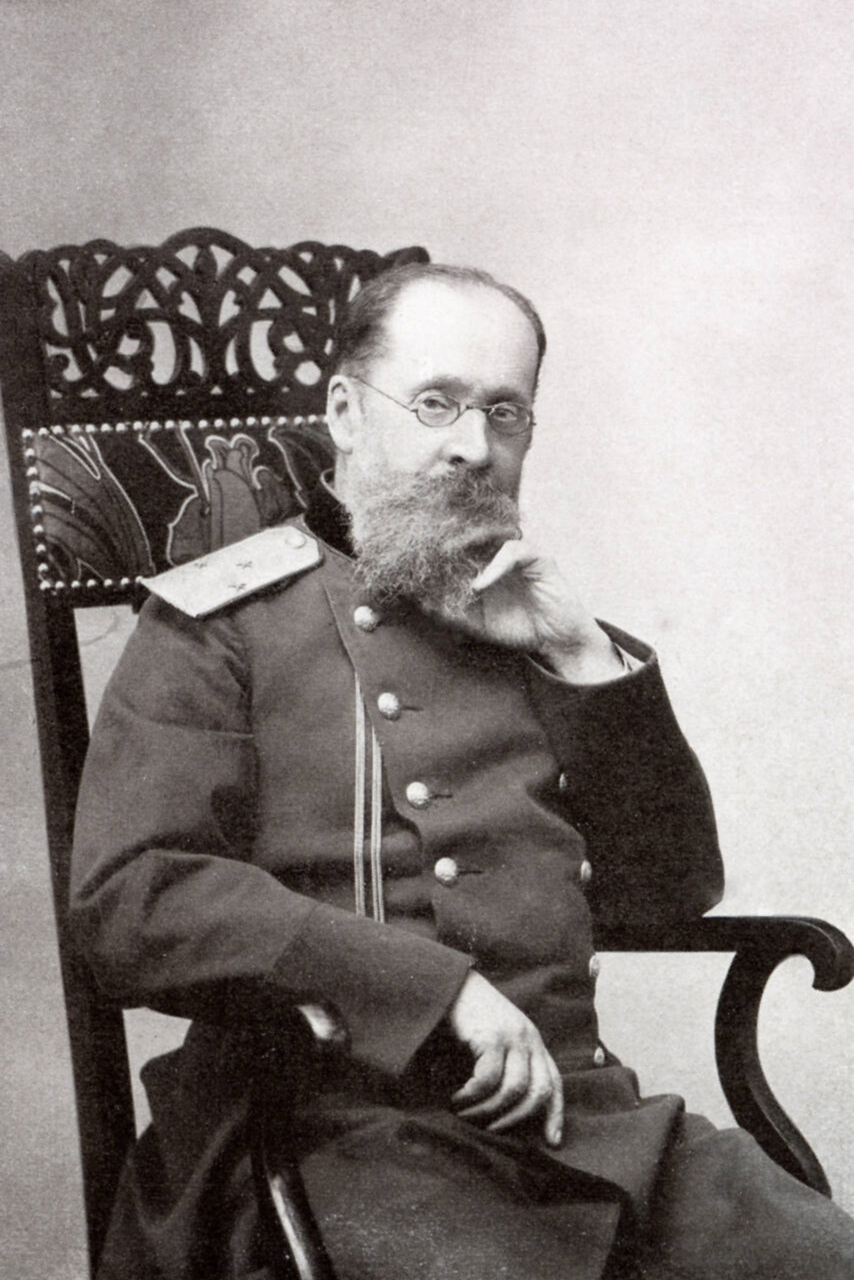
Composer César Cui

The Snow Bogatyr (Снежный богатырь in Cyrillic; Snežnyj bogatyr' in transliteration) is a fairy-tale opera for children in one act, two tableaux, by César Cui, composed in 1905. The libretto was written by a school teacher named Marina Stanislavovna Polʹ, using Russian folk tales.

The title can be translated also as The Snow Hero or The Snow Knight, but these renderings do not quite convey the notion of a Bogatyr.

As with the composer's other children's operas, this work was meant for children to perform in, as well as to watch.

== Performance history ==
The opera was premiered on 15 May 1906 (Old Style), in Yalta, by school students of Ms. Pol', who accompanied the performance at the piano. It was staged also on 4 March 1908 in Saint Petersburg, by opera students at the St. Petersburg Conservatory.

Like one of the composer's other children's operas, Puss in Boots, this opera seems to have had some staying power, or at least potential, in Soviet times, judging by the fact that it was re-published in 1953—with a new libretto devoid of tsarist allusions.

== Characters and setting ==
(Characters as listed in the original edition)

- Tsaritsa: soprano
- Ivan Tsarevich (The Snow Bogatyr): low mezzo-soprano
- The Dragon Gorynych: alto or bass (bass preferred)
- 11 Princess-Swans: children's chorus
- Nurses and mothers: children's chorus

Setting: Fairytale times. A certain kingdom, a certain domain.

== Synopsis ==
(As in the original edition)

Tableau 1. A courtyard. The Princess-Swans are singing and dancing. As they enjoy a snowball fight, they inadvertently hit their mother, the Tsaritsa, in the eyes. She rashly wishes not only to have a son, but also that a whirlwind would sweep away her eleven disobedient daughters. Suddenly there is a blizzard, and the Princess-Swans are swept away. But out of the snowstorm appears the son that the Tsaritsa wished for—the Snow Bogatyr. He promises her that he will find his new sisters.

Tableau 2. A forest. The Princesses are being kept in a peasant's hut that stands on hen's legs (see Baba Yaga). After three attempts, the Snow Bogatyr finally defeats a three-headed Dragon to rescue his new sisters. All join in the opening round-dance as the Snow-Bogatyr urges them homeward.

== Bibliography ==
- Bernandt, G.B. Словарь опер впервые поставленных или изданных в дореволюционной России и в СССР, 1736-1959 [Dictionary of Operas First Performed or Published in Pre-Revolutionary Russia and in the USSR, 1836-1959] (Москва: Советский композитор, 1962), p. 276.
- Cui, César. Снежный богатырь: опера-сказка для детей в одном действии, двух картинах. Клавир. [The Snow Hero: opera-fairytale for children in one act, two tableaux. Piano-vocal score]. Москва: П. Юргенсон, 1906.
  - Soviet (revised) edition: Иван-богатырь: опера-сказка для детей в 1 действии, 2 картинах [Ivan the Bogatyr. Opera-fairytale for children in 1 act, 2 tableaux]. Москва: Музгиз, 1953.
