= Ivan the Fool (opera) =

1913 opera by César Cui

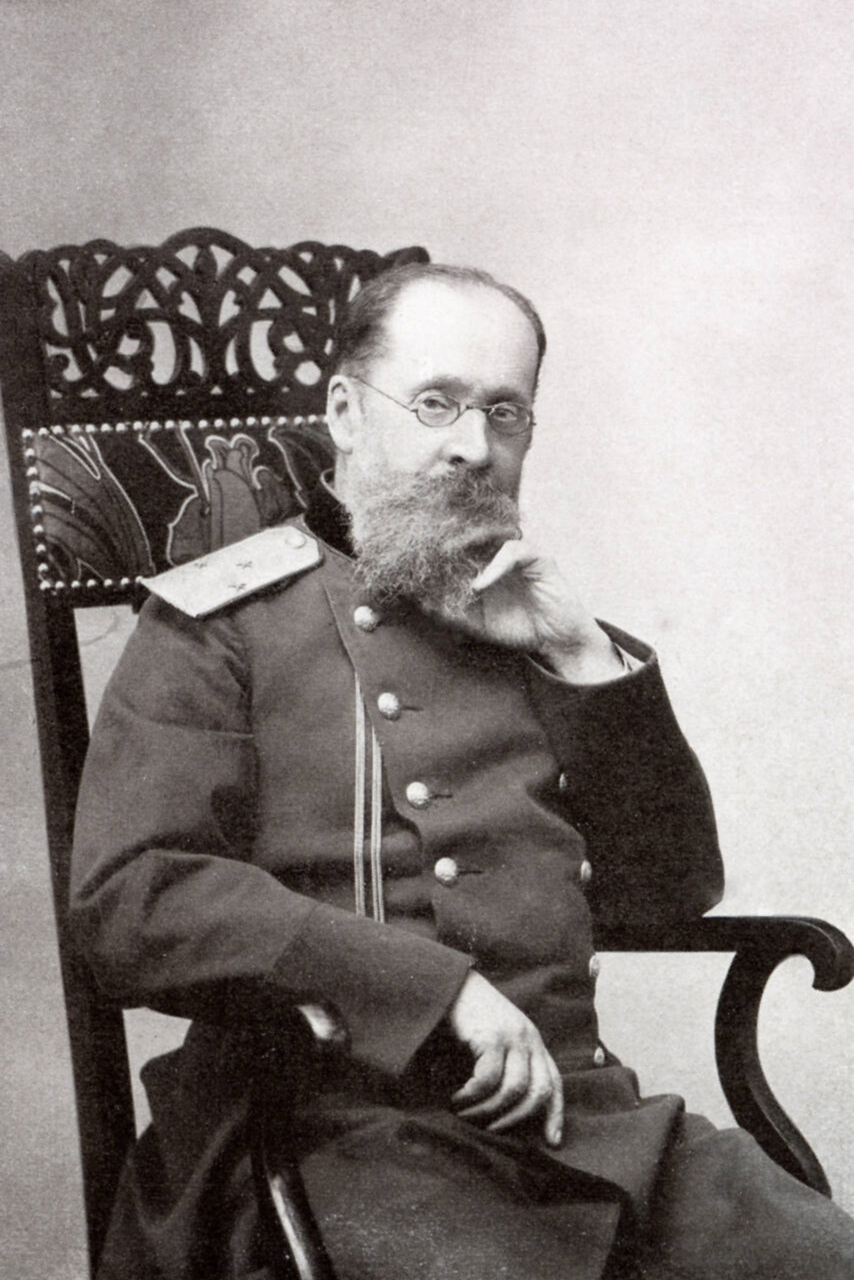
Composer César Cui

Ivan the Fool (Иванушка-дурачок in Cyrillic; Ivanuška-duračok in transliteration), composed in 1913 by César Cui, is an opera-fairytale made for children in one act and three tableaux. The libretto was written by Nadezhda Nikolaevna Dolomanova using Russian folk tales. (It is not derived from Leo Tolstoy's story of the same name.)

The title can be rendered in English in a number of ways, depending upon whether one wishes to consider the diminutives involved: Foolish Ivan, Ivan the Little Fool, Johnny the Little Fool, etc. (The printed Russian score of 1913 adds a parallel title in French, Jeannot "le bêtà".)

The performance history of this opera has yet to be traced.

== Roles ==
- Tsar (contralto)
- Tsarevna [i.e., his daughter Elena] (soprano)
- Ivanushka (mezzo-soprano)
- 1st Brother of Ivan (soprano)
- 2nd Brother of Ivan (mezzo-soprano)
- Father of Ivan (contralto)
- Mother of Ivan (soprano)
- Horse (contralto or bass)
- Courtiers, skomorokhi, gusli-players, wooden stumps (chorus)

== Synopsis ==
Tableau 1 In a clearing in a forest, Ivan has set his horse free. His wagon contains things that are supposed to be driven home for his family, but he empties the wagon so as to place the pots around the freezing tree stumps and to throw out the grain for the birds to eat. When his parents and brothers find him and reprimand him for his foolish slackness, they tell him that he cannot eat dinner with them.

Tableau 2 Within the forest, Ivan has gathered many mushrooms. His brothers enter and inform him that the Tsar is going to give a feast. His daughter, the Tsarevna, is Elena. The man who manages to get her kerchief and bring it to the feast will win her hand in marriage. When his brothers leave, Ivan is intent on going to the feast, but realizes that his clothes are not suitable, so he calls his horse, who magically provides him with proper new clothes.

Tableau 3 Inside the Tsar's palace, the skomorokhi and the courtiers amuse themselves. Elena's kerchief having been taken, she wishes to know where her mysterious bridegroom can be. She notices that Ivan is hiding behind a stove, and that he has the kerchief, whereupon the Tsar welcomes his new son-in-law. Realizing who the bridegroom is, Ivan's brothers at first consider escaping, but instead approach him and reconcile, as the courtiers praise Ivan, the Tsar, and his daughter.

== Bibliography ==
- Cui, César. Иванушка-дурачек: опера сказка для детей в трех картинах [Ivan the Fool: an opera-fairytale for children in three tableaux]. Leipzig: Belaieff, 1914. (Piano-vocal score)
