= List of literary works by César Cui =

This is a partial list of literary works by César Cui.

(Note: As yet there is no complete collected edition of Cui's writings. The vast majority of his published articles on music, in particular, have to be sought individually within the various periodicals in which they were originally printed.)

== Cui's writings on music ==
=== Monographs ===
- История литературы фортепианной музыки. Курс А.Г. Рубинштейна. 1888-1889. 2-е изд. [History of the Literature of Piano Music. A Course by A.G. Rubinstein. 1888-1889. 2nd ed.] Спб: И. Юргенсон, 1911. (Originally published serially in 1889 in Russian: Сеансы А.Г.Рубинштейна. Курс истории литературы фортепианной музыки (Sessions by A.G. Rubinstein. A Course in the History of the Literature of Piano Music, in Nedelia; in French: Cours de littérature musicale des oeuvres pour le piano au Conservatoire de Saint-Pétersbourg, in L'Art, revue bimensuelle illustrée.)
- Кольцо Нибелунгов, трилогия Рихарда Вагнера: Музыкально-критический очерк. 2-е изд. [The Nibelung Ring, trilogy by Richard Wagner: A Musico-Critical Sketch. 2nd ed.] Москва: П. Юргенсон, 1909. (1st monographic ed. published in 1889. Articles originally published in 1876 in Saint Petersburg Vedomosti under the collective title Байрейтское музыкальное торжество [The Bayreuth Music Festival].)
- La musique en Russie. Paris: G. Fischbacher, 1880; rpt. Leipzig: Zentralantiquariat der Deutschen Demokratischen Republik, 1974. (Originally published in 1878-1880 in Revue et Gazette Musicale de Paris.) Italian edition and translation "La musica in Russia" by Aldo Ferraris, 2017, Casa Musicale Eco, Monza.
- Русский романс: очерк его развития [The Russian Romance: a Sketch of Its Development]. Спб: Ф. Финдейзен, 1896. English translation in Classical Essays on the Russian Art Song: 1. The Russian Romance, by Cesar Cui; 2. The Russian Art Song, by Nikolay Findeisen. Nerstrand, Minn.: James Walker, 1993.

=== Collections ===
- Избранные статьи [Selected Articles]. Ленинград: Гос. муз. изд-во, 1952. (Includes a nearly complete bibliography of his published articles.)
- Избранные статьи об исполнителях [Selected Articles about Performers]. Москва: Гос. муз. изд-во, 1957.
- Музыкально-критические статьи. Т.1. Со портретом автора и предисловием А.Н. Римского-Корсакова. [Critical Articles on Music. Vol. 1. With a portrait of the author and a foreword by A.N. Rimsky-Korsakov. ] Петроград: Музыкальный современник, 1918. (Note: No further volumes were published.)

=== Miscellaneous ===
- "A Historical Sketch of Music in Russia," The Century Library of Music. Ed. by Ignace Jan Paderewski. Vol. 7. New York: The Century Co., 1901, p. 197-219.
- Hundreds of individual feuilletons/articles in multiple publications (mostly periodicals) not included in monographs and collections cited above.

== Cui's writings on military fortifications ==
- "Атака и оборона современных крепостей (Разработка этого вопроса в Прусии)" ["Attack and Defence of Contemporary Fortresses (An Elaboration of This Matter in Prussia)"]. Спб: Тип. Деп. уделов, 1881. (From Военный сборник, 1881, No. 7)
- "Бельгия, Антверпен и Бриальмон" ["Belgium, Antwerp, and Brialmont"]. Спб: Тип Деп. уделов, 1882. (From Инженерный журнал, 1881, No. 11)
- Долговременная фортификация: исторический очерк. Курс Михайловской арт. акад. [Permanent Fortifications: A Historical Sketch. A Course of the Mikhailovsky Artillery Akademy] Спб.: 187-?.
- Записки фортификации младшего юнкерского класса Николаевского инженерного училища [Fortification Notes of the Younger Cadet Class of the Nikolaevsky Engineering School]. Спб.: 186-?
- Краткий исторический очерк долговременной фортификации. 3., доп. изд. [Concise Historical Sketch of Permanent Fortifications. Third, supplemented ed..] Спб.: Тип. Императорской Академии наук, 1897. (1st ed. published in 1877.)
- Краткий учебник полевой фортификации. 9-е просм. изд. [Concise Textbook of Field Fortification. 9th revised ed.] Спб.: В Березовский, 1903. (1st ed. titled: Записки полевой фортификации. Курс младшего класса Николаевск. инж. и Михайловск. артил. училища [Notes on Field Fortification. A Course of the Younger Class of the Nikolaevsky Engineering and Mikhailovsky Artillery Schools], 1873; 2nd ed. titled: Полевая фортификация. Курс Николаевск.-инж., Михайловск.-артил. и Николаевск.-кавалерийск. училищ [Field Fortification. A Course of the Nikolaevsky Engineering, Mikhailovsky Artillery, and Nikolaevsky Cavalry Schools], 1877.)
- Опыт рационального определения величины гарнизонов крепостей [Essay on the Efficient Determination of Data on Garrison Fortresses]. Спб: типо-лит. А.Е. Ландау, 1899.
- "Путевые заметки инженерного офицера на театре военных действий в европейской Турции" ["Travel Notes of an Engineering Officer in the Theater of Military Activities in European Turkey"], Спб.: Тип. Деп. уделов, 1878. (From Инженерный журнал, 1878, Nos. 8, 9.)
- "Рост крепостей и изменение их формы в зависимости от увеличения численности армий" ["The Size of Fortresses and the Modification of Their Form Depending on the Expansion of the Strength of Armies"]. Спб: 1901. (Общество ревнителей военных знаний, No. 37, 24 янв. 1901 г.)
- Учебник фортификации для пехотных юнкерских училищ. Изд. 2-е, просм. и доп. [Textbook of Fortification for Infantry Cadet Schools. 2nd ed., revised and supplemented]. Спб.: Воен. тип., 1899. (1st ed. published in 1892)

== Letters ==
- Избранные письма [Selected Letters]. Ленинград: Гос. муз. изд-во, 1955.
