= Little Red Riding Hood (opera) =

Opera-fairytale for children in two acts by César Cui

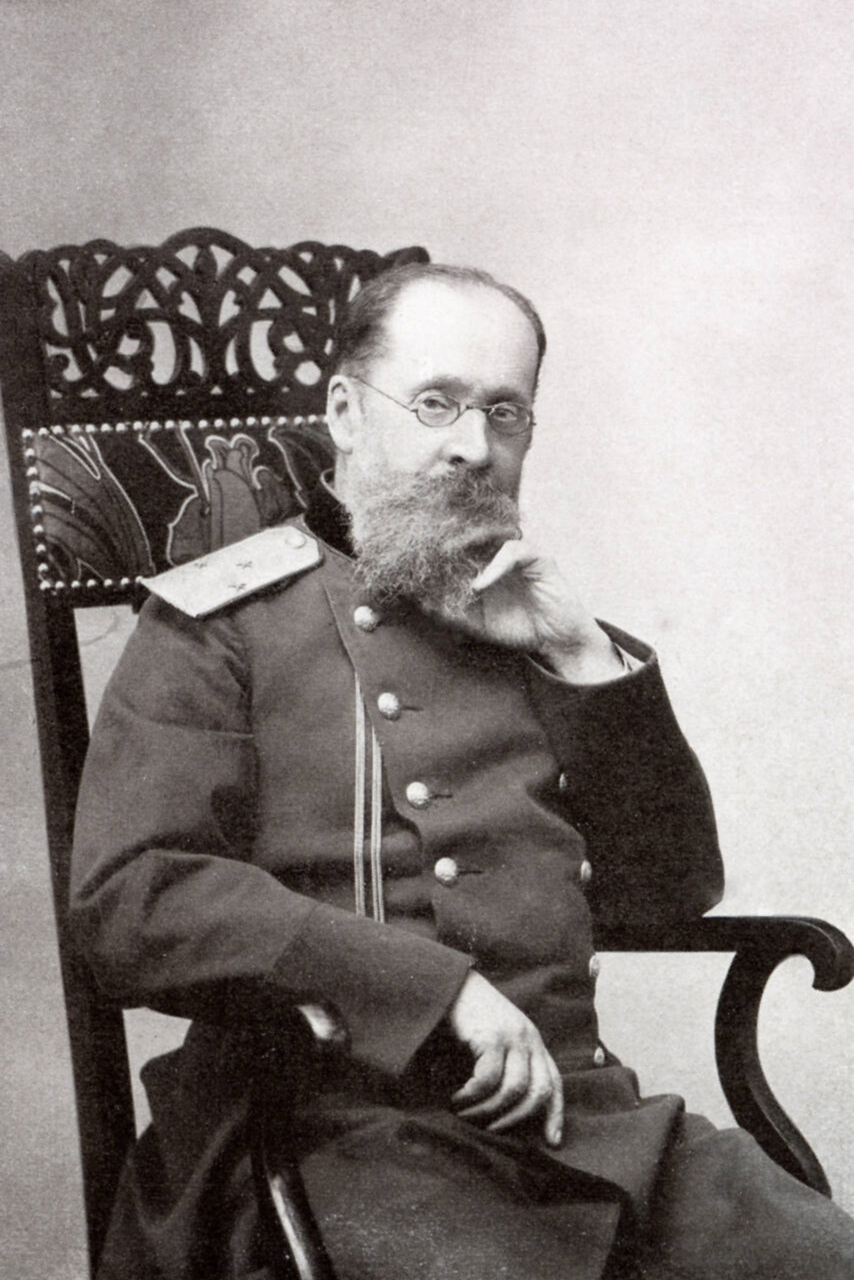
Composer César Cui

Little Red Riding Hood (Russian: Красная шапочка, romanized: Krasnaja šapočka, lit. 'little red cap') is a fairy-tale opera for children in two acts (three tableaux) by César Cui, composed in 1911. The libretto was written by Marina Stanislavona Pol', based on Charles Perrault's fairytale of the same name.

The printed score from 1912 bears a dedication to Crown Prince Alexey of Imperial Russia.

The earliest date of a performance for this opera has yet to be established. However, it is known to have been staged in 1921, in Gomel, in the Byelorussian SSR (now Belarus), by students from the People's City Conservatory and the Technical School.

== Characters and setting ==
- The Grandmother: alto
- The Mother: mezzo-soprano
- Little Red Riding-Hood: soprano
- The Wolf: alto
- A Hunter: soprano
- A Woodcutter: mezzo-soprano
- Hunters and woodcutters
- Narrating chorus

== Synopsis ==
(Note: The plot, though nominally based on Perrault, adds a happy ending.)

Act I, Tableau 1. The chorus introduces the story. The setting is the edge of a forest; the porch of Little Red Riding Hood's house is off to the side. As little Red Riding Hood goes off to take a basket of fresh cakes to her ill grandmother, her Mother warns her not to dawdle in the woods or to talk to strangers. The scenery changes without a break to —

Act I, Tableau 2. – A spooky forest. Woodcutters can be heard chopping wood. Riding Hood comes out of some bushes. As she pauses to pick some flowers, and the Wolf catches sight of her. On the path he stops her and makes up a story about a shortcut the Grandmother's house. When he challenges her to see who will get there first, she agrees, and both of them run off in different directions as the woodcutters resume their work.

Act II. The chorus appears again to explain that the Wolf has not eaten for three days and was able to get to Grandmother's house first. We see inside Grandmother's cottage and outside, a glade. The Wolf, pretending to be Riding Hood, manages to get into the house and swallow Grandmother. He takes her place in the bed before Riding Hood arrives. In several questions she expresses her surprise at how differently Grandmother looks now, and the Wolf swallows her.

Some hunters and woodcutters, who have been tracking the Wolf, come by and enter the house. They find the Wolf in his sleep and open his belly to let Grandmother and Riding-Hood out. After they sew up the Wolf again, he repents and is permitted to live in the forest as long as he lives up to his promise to be good.

== Bibliography ==
- Cui, César. Красная шапочка: детская опера-сказка [Little Red Riding-Hood: opera-fairytale for children]. Москва: Печатник, 1912. (Piano-vocal score)
- Neef, Sigrid. Handbuch der russischen und sowjetischen Oper. 1st ed. Kassel: Bärenreiter, 1989, c1985, p. 148.
