= The Saracen (opera) =

Opera by César Cui

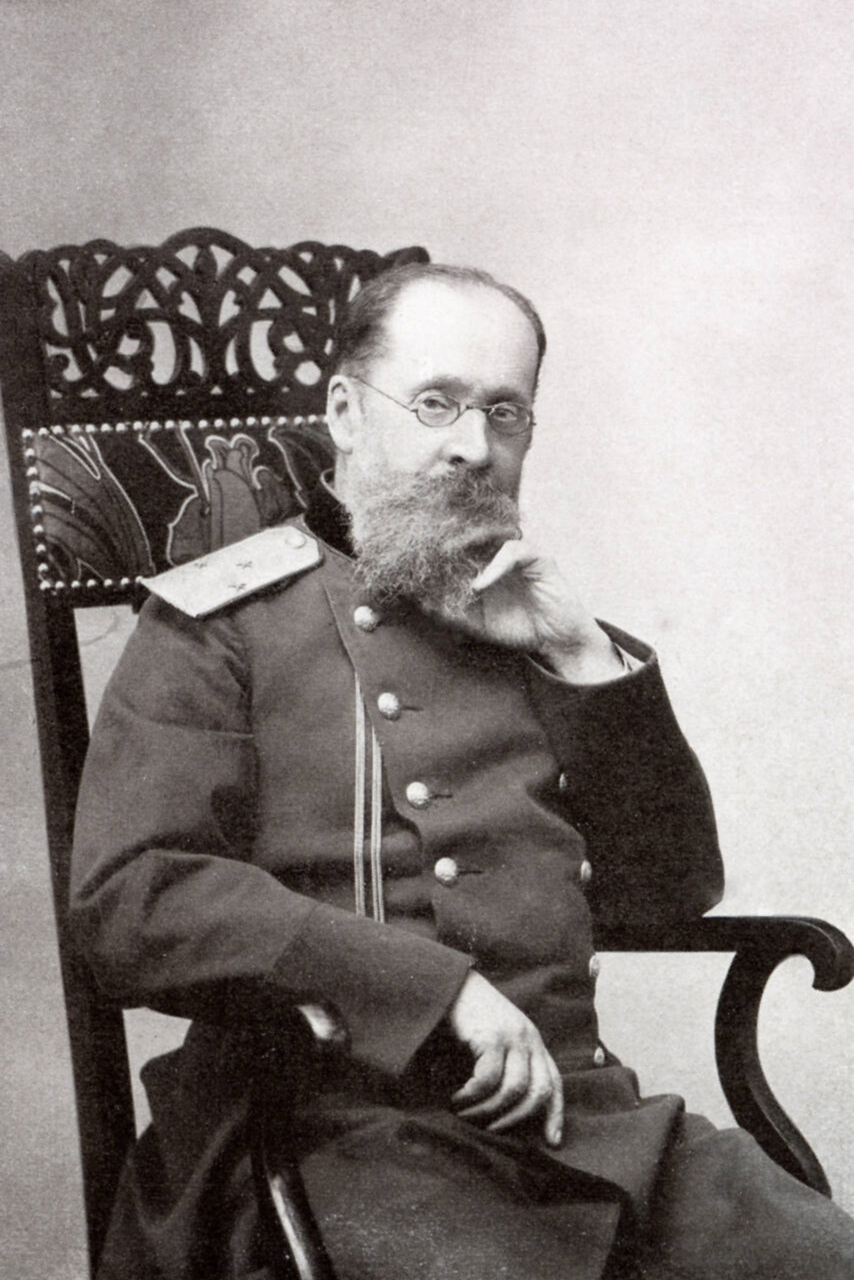
Composer César Cui

The Saracen (Сарацин in Cyrillic, Saracin in transliteration), is an opera by César Cui composed during 1896–1898. The libretto was written by Vladimir Vasilievich Stasov and the composer, based on a play by Alexandre Dumas (père) entitled Charles VII chez ses grands vassaux. The opera was premiered on 2 November 1899 (Old Style), in Saint Petersburg at the Mariinsky Theatre, with Eduard Nápravník as conductor. It was staged also in 1902 by the Moscow Private Opera at the Solodovnikov Theatre, but never became part of the standard operatic repertoire.

The Saracen can be understood to some extent as a sequel to Tchaikovsky's opera The Maid of Orleans in that later events involving the same French monarch are involved.

== Characters and setting ==
- Charles VII, King of France: tenor
- Count Savoisy: bass
- Yaqoub, a Saracen: baritone
- Bérengère, Countess Savoisy: soprano
- Agnès Sorel: soprano
- Dunois: baritone
- Isabelle: (silent role)
- Raymond: bass
- André: tenor
- Archer: baritone
- Chaplain: bass
- Treasurer: baritone
- Page: soprano
- 1st Sentry: tenor
- 2nd Sentry: tenor
- Archers, hunters, trumpeters, courtiers of the king and of Count Savoisy: chorus

The action takes place in France of the early 15th-century, in the castle of Count Savoisy.

== Synopsis ==
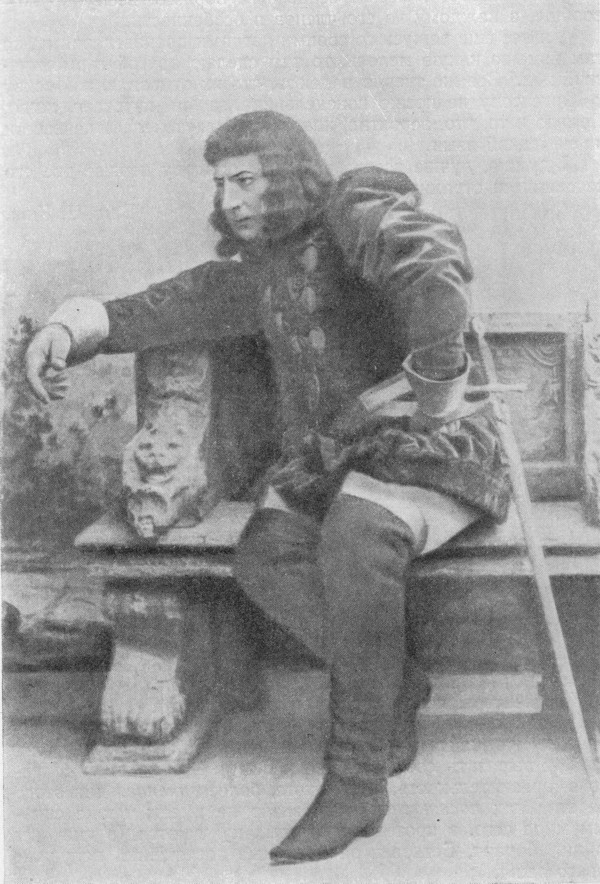
Yershov in the role of Charles VII from the premiere production of 1899

Act I. A chorus of archers makes merry while the Count is away. When André shows everyone the stag that he has just killed, Yaqoub relates a story about how he as a boy in Egypt had killed a lion preying on his father's herd.

Raymond enters, reminding Yaqoub of saving the latter's life, and presents a letter from Pope Benedict XIII, to which all but Yaqoub cross themselves. The noise of calls for his death brings in Bérangère, who dismisses everyone except for Yaqoub. She asks him what the trouble is, and he relates what his life was like before being taken prisoner by Raymond. When she tells that her own suffering is greater than his, he sees her as a comforting angel, and promises to kill the person who is making her unhappy.

The Chaplain enters with the people to say prayers for Savoisy to have an heir. He reads from the Biblical story of Sarah, Abraham, and Hagar. As they pray, Raymond commands Yaqoub to kneel, but the Saracen's refusal brings about a conflict in which Yaqoub kills Raymond with a dagger. Count Savoisy appears on the scene and calls for a trial of Yaqoub, whereupon the Chaplain leads a prayer for Raymond.

Act II. The Chaplain tells Bérangère that her marriage to the Count is dissolved by papal decree, and that she must go to a convent. She exits. After making sure that the Chaplain has taken care of the matter, Savoisy rationalizes that his divorce is necessary in order to produce an heir for France.

When the court enters for the trial of Yaqoub, a page announces that the King is arriving, thus giving Savoisy a chance to hold the trial in the King's presence. After the King and Agnès enter, Yaqoub defends himself on the grounds that he has been deprived of his freedom. Savoisy pronounces a sentence of death, but the King intervenes and pardons Yaqoub.

The King dismisses everyone except Savoisy in order to discuss the latter's loyalty. It turns out that the reason for the King's presence is to go hunting. When Agnès calls the King to bed, Savoisy, alone, stands guard as he sleeps.

Act III. It is the next morning. Savoisy, still on guard, hopes that there will be news of victory for France so that the King will take action. He exits. The King and Agnès greet the new day. He would rather be in her arms than under a crown. Outside, though, rumblings can be heard.

Savoisy enters, insisting on the King's service for France, but the latter decides to go hunting, and exits. Savoisy prevents Agnès from going along and convinces her that she has caused the King to be distracted from his royal duties.

The hunt is being prepared. The King enters, and learns from Dunois that his commanders have been captured. Then Agnès appears. When she tells the King that he is not acting as a responsible monarch of his country and that she will go to join the winner of the war (Bedford), the King comes to his senses and calls everyone to battle.

Act IV. Bérangère, alone, is suffering. Savoisy is surprised to find her. She begs forgiveness, but he tells her that it is too late. Cursing him, she exits to prepare for her departure.

Yaqoub, having decided to entrust himself again to the Count, enters. Savoisy tells the Chaplain to take his ex-wife to a convent and to return immediately to preside over his wedding to Isabelle; the count leaves.

After a woman dressed like Bérangère leaves with the Chaplain, Bérangère herself comes out and startles Yaqoub, who informs her of the upcoming wedding. She refuses to believe that it will take place, until Isabelle arrives and is greeted by the Count. Bérangère reminds Yaqoub of his promise to kill her tormentor. At first he refuses to kill Savoisy, because of being saved in the desert, but when she tells him that Savoisy has her love as long as he is alive, Yaqoub resolves to kill him.

A choir sings the "Gloria Patri." From the wedding service Savoisy and Isabelle arrive and proceed to their chamber. Yaqoub follows them. Savoisy is stabbed offstage and cries out, whereupon Bérangère drinks poison. When Yaqoub runs out of the bridal chamber, followed by the wounded Savoisy, Bérangère takes direct responsibility for killing her husband. Savoisy dies, and Yaqoub pleads with Bérangère to run away with him, but she dies, too, and Yaqoub is left in despair for what she has done to him.

== Notable musical excerpts ==
In this opera the composer makes his first attempt at writing each act in the score without dividing into separate numbers or scenes (perhaps in emulation of Richard Wagner's music dramas). Nevertheless, several musical selections could be extracted (as was done by the publisher P. Jurgenson).

- Orchestral Introduction
- The Count's Lullaby. "Spi, spokojno spi" (end of Act II)
- "Gloria Patri" and Wedding Recessional (Act IV)
  - Audio sketch of this selection via MIDI-to-Ogg

== Bibliography ==
- Bernandt, G.B. Словарь опер впервые поставленных или изданных в дореволюционной России и в СССР, 1736-1959 [Dictionary of Operas First Performed or Published in Pre-Revolutionary Russia and in the USSR, 1836-1959] (Москва: Советский композитор, 1962), p. 259.
- Cui, César. Сарацин: опера в четырех действиях, идз. для пения [The Saracen, opera in four acts. Piano-vocal score]. Москва: П. Юргенсон, 1899.
