= A Feast in the Time of Plague (Woolf opera) =

A Feast in the Time of Plague is a 2020 opera by Alex Woolf to a libretto by David Pountney, loosely based on the "little tragedy" of the same name by Alexander Pushkin.

== Background ==
The opera was commissioned by Grange Park Opera during the COVID-19 pandemic. Pountney described how he came to write the libretto whilst in lockdown in Wales

I responded to Pushkin’s little fragment by creating 12 – because of the Last Supper – very varied characters who arrive voluntarily and most of whom depart involuntarily – i.e. they die. In between they capture the defiance and solidarity that we have all experienced during these strange times. The virus exposes truths about all of us in surprising ways. A Feast in the Time of Plague captures this – as well as the essential lesson that we must carry on laughing.

The 25-year old Woolf wrote the music in six weeks. The premiere performance took place at Grange Park Opera on 12 September 2020, accompanied by the composer playing piano in the wings.

== Roles ==
Role	Voice type	Premiere cast Grange Park Opera, 12 September 2020 (Conductor: Toby Purser)
Elena	soprano	Claire Booth
Frederic, her butler	tenor	Peter Hoare
Joyce, the cook	contralto	Anne-Marie Owens
Lidochka, Elena's daughter	soprano	Soraya Mafi
Claire, a clairvoyant	soprano	Susan Bullock
Antoine, a playboy	baritone	Simon Keenlyside
McGuire, grandmother	soprano	Janis Kelly
Pius, an informer	tenor	Jeff Lloyd Roberts
Karl, a radical bohemian	baritone	Will Dazeley
Death/Policeman/Judas	bass	Clive Bayley
Adina, newly wed to Pat	soprano	Sarah Minns
Pat, newly wed to Adina	baritone	Harry Thatcher

== Synopsis ==
The opera is in two sections, Arrivals and Departures. "Twelve archetypes – from cook to policeman to dewy newlyweds – gather for a last supper, each offering their own thoughts on risk, life and death."

== Reception ==
The critic of The Guardian commented that it could benefit from longer-term reconsideration and rewriting, but in the meantime "enjoy it as it is: a coup, achieved in an instant with flair, hard work and brilliant team spirit." Rupert Christiansen, writing in the Daily Telegraph, gave the opera four stars (out of five), describing it as "intriguing [and] fabulously performed." The reviewer for The Stage noted that "[e]veryone gets his or her turn, and if some of the individual numbers go on too long – the parody pastiches would make greater impact if shorter – there’s certainly a huge amount of talent on stage."
