= A Feast in Time of Plague (Cui opera) =

Opera by César Cui

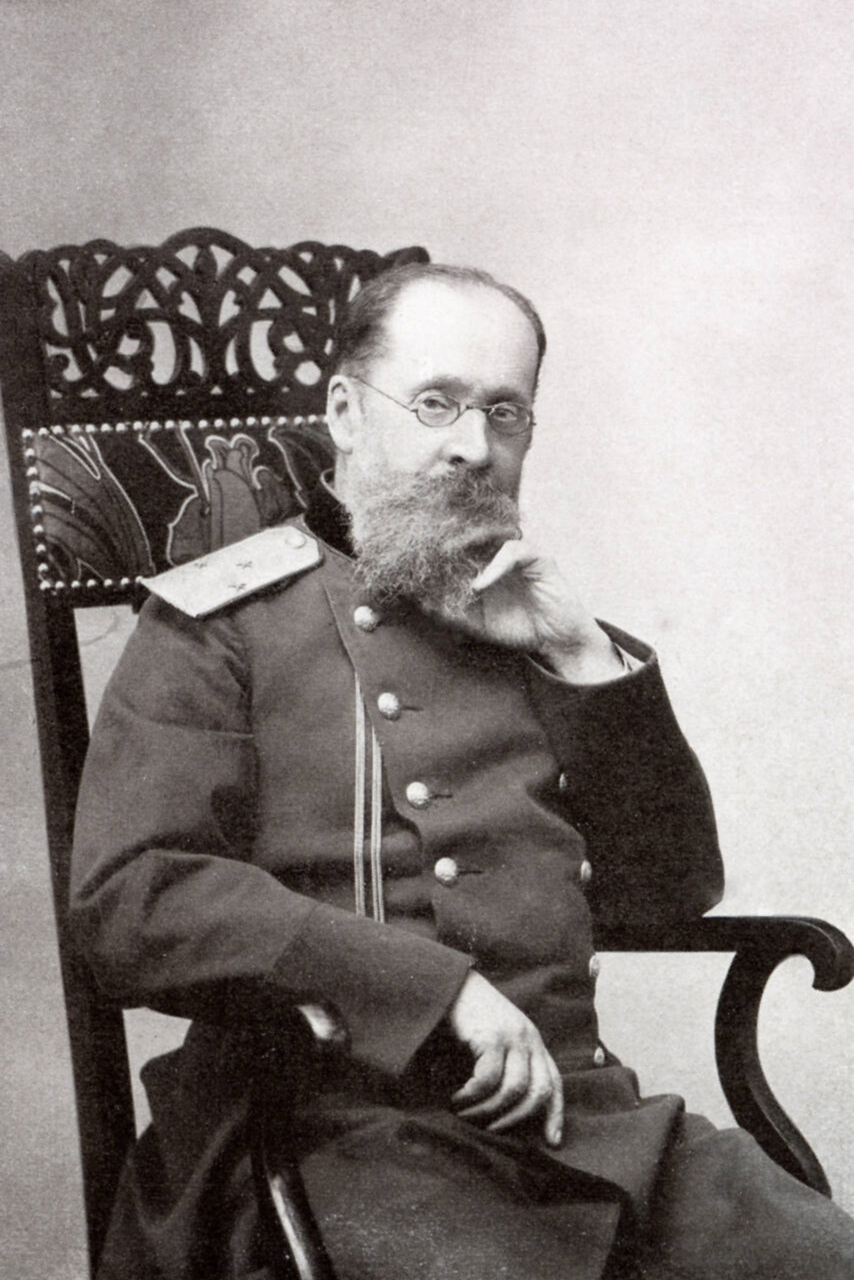
Composer César Cui

A Feast in Time of Plague (Пир во время чумы in Cyrillic, Pir vo vremya chumy in English transliteration) is an opera (literally labeled "dramatic scenes") in one act by César Cui, composed in 1900. The libretto was taken verbatim from the 1830 play A Feast in Time of Plague, one of the four Little Tragedies by Aleksandr Pushkin. The title has been translated also as Feast in the Time of the Plague and Feast during the Plague.

Cui composed and published the two songs in the play (i.e., "Mary's Song" and "Walsingham's Hymn") separately in the decade before the opera was formally composed.

== Performance history ==
The opera was premiered on 11 November 1901 (Old Style), in Moscow at the Noviy Theater. Although it never became part of the standard repertory, Feast was revived by the Tchaikovsky Opera in Perm, Russia in 1999 as part of a Pushkin-bicentennial performance of all four of the operatic settings of the Little Tragedies, i.e., Dargomyzhsky's The Stone Guest, Rimsky-Korsakov's Mozart and Salieri, and Rachmaninoff's The Miserly Knight.

Feast was given its American premiere on October 14, 2009 by the Little Opera Theatre of New York, directed by Philip Shneidman.

A CD recording of Feast was issued on the Chandos label in 2004, with the Russian State Symphony Orchestra under Valery Polyansky.

Because of its timely subject matter and relatively small performance forces, A Feast in Time of Plague has received renewed interest during the COVID-19 pandemic, with virtual productions popping up in Brazil, Sweden, and Russia, among others.

== Characters and setting ==
- President (Walsingham): baritone
- Young Man: tenor
- Priest: bass
- Mary: mezzo-soprano
- Louisa: soprano
- A Negro: (silent role)
- Feasting men and women: chorus

Setting: London, 1665, on a terrace.

== Synopsis ==
In the midst of a feast, a Young Man calls for everyone to remember and raise a toast to one of their friends who recently died from the plague. Walsingham, however, stops them and calls for a moment of silence instead. He then requests that Mary sing something sad before the merriment resumes. He is touched by her song, but Louisa thinks that Mary is just playing on his emotions.

Louisa's cynical rant is interrupted by the creaking sounds of a dead-cart passing by. She faints; when she comes to, she asks to know whether she was only dreaming about the cart. The Young Man tries to cheer her up, and asks Walsingham to sing something in honor of the plague.

When Walsingham finishes singing his hymn, the Priest enters, chastises the merrymakers for disrespecting the dead, and begs them to leave. When the Priest attempts to shame Walsingham by bringing up the memory of the latter's recently deceased mother and wife, Walsingham sends the Priest away and then remains lost in thought. The feasters return to their meal, momentarily interrupted by distant sounds of a funeral procession.

== Bibliography ==
Babalowa, Maria. "Fünf Vögel in einem Käfig," Opernwelt, Juni 1999, pp. 20–21. (Concerning the revival in Perm.)

Bernandt, G.B. Словарь опер впервые поставленных или изданных в дореволюционной России и в СССР, 1736-1959 [Dictionary of Operas First Performed or Published in Pre-Revolutionary Russia and in the USSR, 1836-1959] (Москва: Советский композитор, 1962), pp. 227.

Isaakian, Georgii. "Русское Кольцо" ["A Russian Ring"], Музыкальная академия, 1999, no. 2, pp. 22–30. (Concerning the revival in Perm.)

Cui, César. Пир во время чумы: драматические сцены А.С. Пушкина [Feast in Time of Plague: dramatic scenes by A.S. Pushkin]. Clavierauszug. Leipzig: Belaieff, 1901.

Nazarov, A.F. Цезарь Антонович Кюи (Cesar Antonovich Cui) (Moskva: Muzyka, 1989).
