= The Captain's Daughter (opera) =

Opera by César Cui

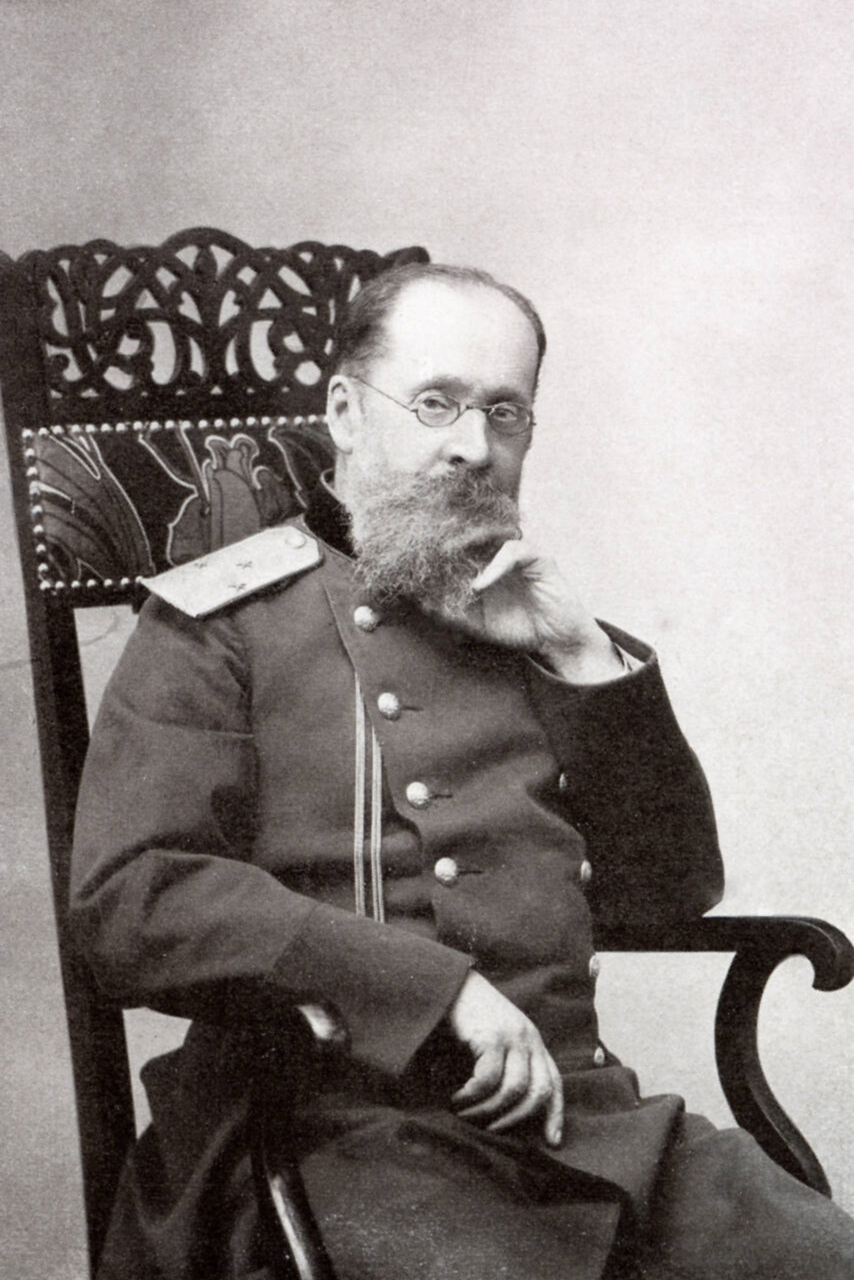
Composer César Cui

The Captain's Daughter (Капитанская дочка in Cyrillic; Kapitanskaja dočka in transliteration) is an opera in four acts (eight tableaux) by César Cui, composed during 1907–1909. The libretto was adapted by the composer from Alexander Pushkin's 1836 novel of the same name.

== Performance history ==
The opera was premiered on 14 February 1911 (Old Style) at the Mariinsky Theatre in Saint Petersburg under the conductorship of Eduard Nápravník. Its Moscow premiere took place on 17 September 1914 at the Solodovnikov Theater, with S.I. Zimin's Opera Company.

== Characters and setting ==
- Empress Catherine the Great: mezzo-soprano
- Andrei Petrovich Grinev, a retired major: bass
- Avdotʹia Vasil'evna [Grineva], his wife: soprano
- Petr [or Pyotr] Andreevich, their son: tenor
- Savelʹich, a servant: baritone
- Dorofei, a proprietor of an inn: tenor
- Potap, a Cossack: bass
- The Guide (Pugachev): baritone
- Ivan Kuzʹmich Mironov, commandant of Belgorodsky fortress: bass
- Vasilisa Egorovna [Mironova], his wife: contralto
- Masha, their daughter: soprano
- Aleksei Ivanovich Shvabrin, an ensign: baritone
- Ivan Ignatʹevich Zharkov, a lieutenant: tenor
- Maksimych, a sergeant: tenor
- A Corporal: bass
- Chumakov, a song-leader: tenor
- Garrison soldiers, residents, rebels, courtiers: chorus

The action takes place in Russia, in 1775.

== Synopsis ==
(Note: in the score the tableaux are designated with continuous numbering.)

=== Act I ===
Tableau 1. The Grinevs' house. The father decides to send his seventeen-year-old son Petr off to become a soldier; the household bids him farewell as he leaves with Savel'ich. An orchestral interlude represents their journey, in which they are trapped in a snowstorm and rescued by a Guide.

Tableau 2. Arriving at an inn, the three of them set up lodgings. The Guide and the Innkeeper converse in coded language. Everyone goes to bed. Petr has a dream in which his father lies dying on a bed with his mother and servants around. Petr walks up to the scene and finds that the man in the bed is not his father, but the Guide, who tries to bless him and then waves an axe in all directions, causing a disturbance. The dream ends as a rooster crows and dawn breaks. The guests prepare for travelling again. Petr gives his coat to the Guide to stay warm. The three leave.

=== Act II ===
Tableau 3. Belogorsky Fortress, the square and the porch of the Commandant's house. Zharkov is helping Mironova wind her yarn, a group of invalid soldiers marches past. Petr, who has already settled in, reads a love poem he has written to get Shvabrin's opinion. This leads to an argument between them concerning Masha; they agree to a duel and go off elsewhere to take care of it. The invalids march by once more. Savel'ich, who has seen the duel, arouses the residents. Petr is brought in on a stretcher unconscious and taken into the Mironov's house.

Tableau 4. A room in the Commandant's house. Petr lies asleep, still recovering. Masha sings to him. He awakens and proposes marriage to her, but she is concerned about whether his family will accept her; he assures her otherwise. Savel'ich enters with a letter from Grinev which refuses permission to Petr to marry Masha. She cannot marry without Petr's parents' consent and exits. Petr vows to convince his father.

Mironov enters, reading aloud a letter from the General. Pugachev has sacked several fortresses, and must be destroyed. Mironova tells of the capture of another fortress. Mironov decides that Masha should be sent away for safety. Mironova, Zharkov, Petr, Shvabrin, and Mironov join in a patriotic oath not to surrender.

=== Act III ===
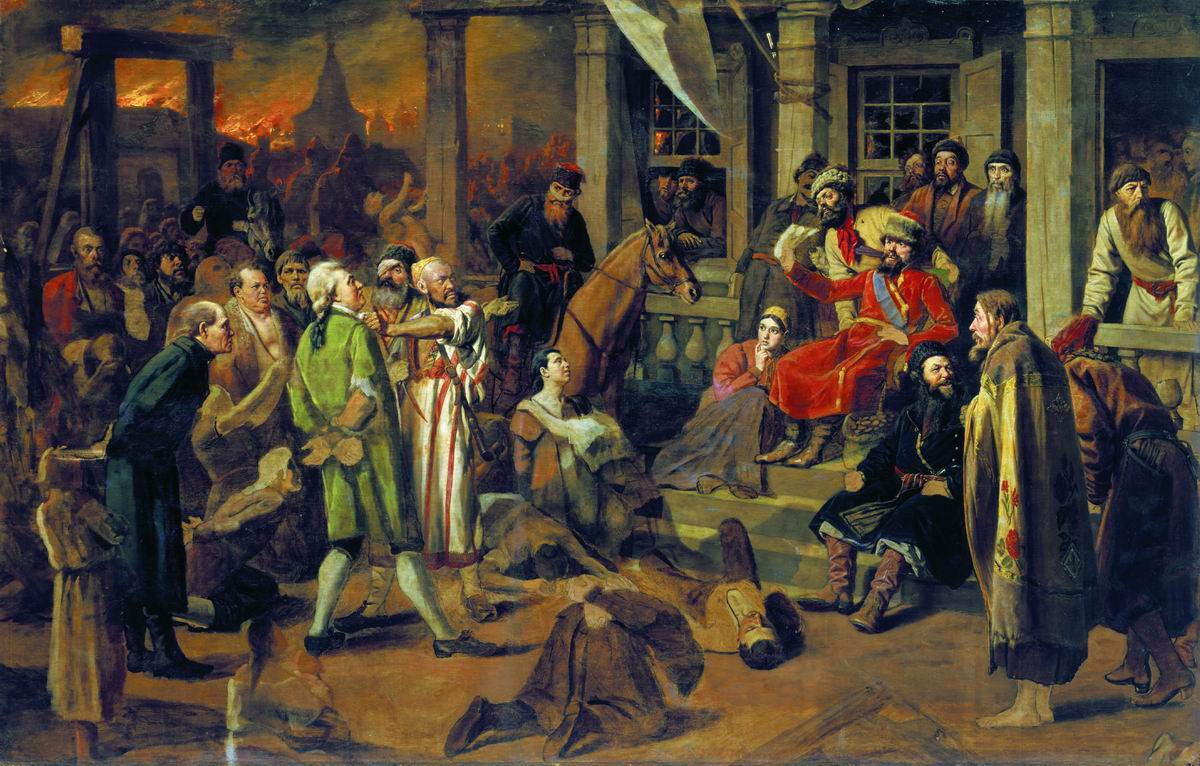
Pugachev's Judgement (1879). Painting by Vasily Perov

Tableau 5. Belogorsky Fortress (same setting as Tableau 3). Preparations are made in the fortress for an attack. Mironov takes leave of Mironova. The insurgents attack the fortress and take it. Pugachev comes on the scene. Mironov and Zharkov are executed by hanging (offstage). Pugachev recognizes Petr, though, and spares him. Although the people beg him to, Petr will not kiss Pugachev's hand. In runs Mironova, mourning her husband. She is taken away to be killed.

Pugachev welcomes Petr. The men and women dance, and Chumakov strikes up a song. Pugachev and Petr are left alone to converse. It is revealed that Pugachev was the guide to whom Petr gave his coat. However Petr refuses to be a traitor, and goes off. Pugachev is left wondering about his fate as a last string of Chumakov's song is sung.

Tableau 6. A room in the Commandant's house (same setting as Tableau 4). Masha, locked in the room, is now an orphan. Shvabrin enters and begs her to marry him. She refuses, and he exits, but outside the room he runs into Pugachev and Petr. He makes up a story that she is being kept there because she is ill, and that they are married. Masha reveals the truth. Pugachev sets Masha free. Petr, who still cannot give Pugachev his allegiance, nevertheless is grateful to Pugachev. He asks Pugachev to let him and Masha leave. Pugachev agrees, tells Shvabrin to give them a pass to travel, and bids them farewell. Left alone, the two lovers discuss their plans. Petr will take Masha to his parents house, and his father will be honored to have the daughter of brave Captain Mironov in his house.

=== Act IV ===
Tableau 7. The Grinevs' house (same setting as Tableau 1). Masha is now living there, but Petr has been arrested. She explains to the Grinev's that he got into trouble only because he was trying to protect her. She will go to Tsarskoye Selo to try to plead for him among influential people. Petr's parents bless her.

Tableau 8. A hall in the Imperial palace in Saint Petersburg. Courtiers sing the praises of the Empress. She makes her entrance and announces that Pugachev has been captured. Masha and the Grinev family enter. The Empress grants Masha's request by pardoning Petr, and blesses their life together, as the courtiers resume their praise.

== Notable excerpts ==
(Note: these titles are not marked in the score.)

- Petr's poem, Tableau 3
- First love duet, Tableau 4
- Dances, Tableau 5
- Chumakov's song, Tableau 5
- Second love duet, Tableau 6
- Final polonaise, Tableau 8

== Bibliography ==
Bernandt, G.B. Словарь опер впервые поставленных или изданных в дореволюционной России и в СССР, 1736-1959 [Dictionary of Operas First Performed or Published in Pre-Revolutionary Russia and in the USSR, 1836-1959]. Москва: Советский композитор, 1962, p. 130.

Cui, César. Капитанская дочка: опера в четырех действиях и восьмих картинах. Для пения с фортепиано [The Captain's Daughter, opera in four acts and eight tableaux. Piano-vocal score]. Москва: П. Юргенсон, 1910.

Nazarov, A.F. Цезарь Антонович Кюи [Cezar' Antonovič Kjui]. Moskva: Muzyka, 1989.
