= Angelo (opera) =

Opera by César Cui

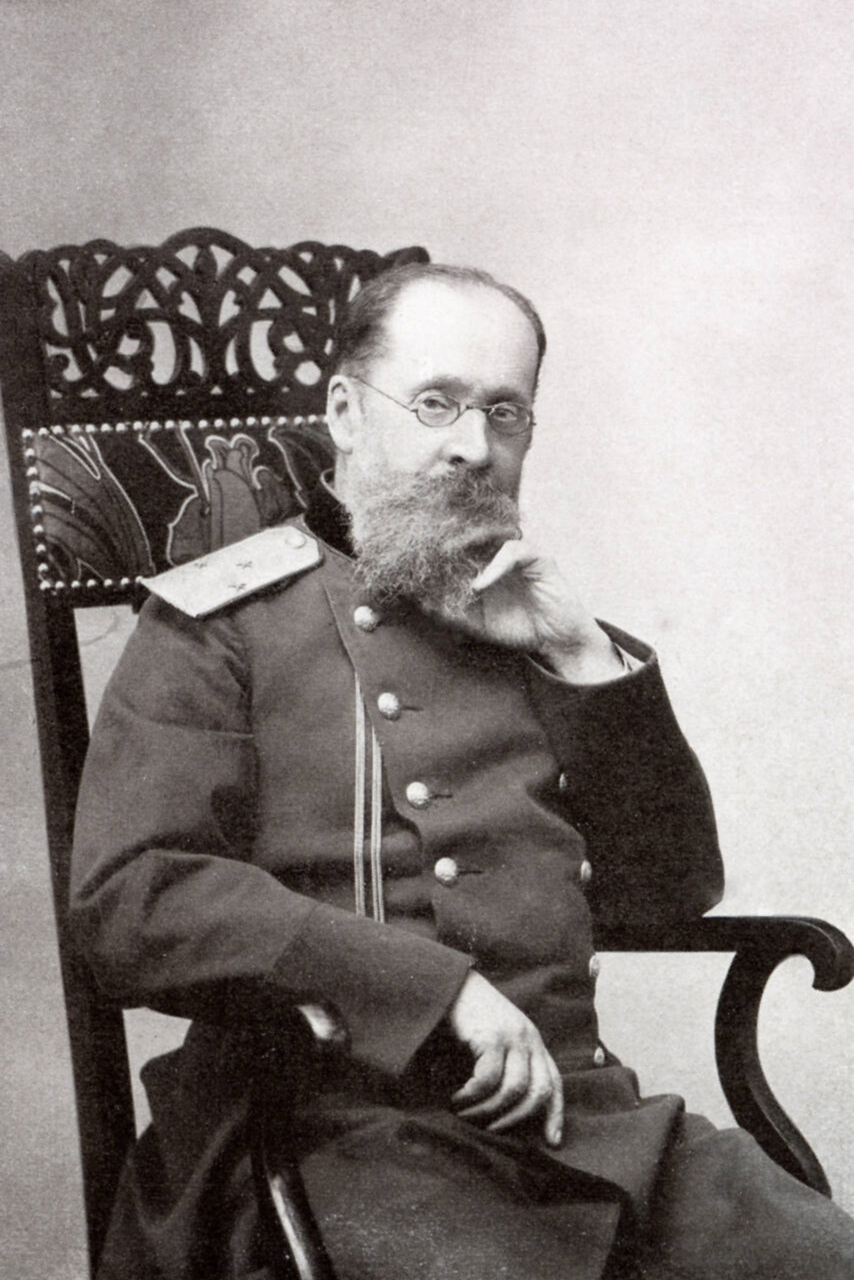
Composer César Cui

Angelo (Анджело in Cyrillic; Andželo in transliteration) is an opera in four acts by César Cui, composed during 1871–1875, with a libretto by Viktor Burenin based on Victor Hugo's 1835 prose play, Angelo, Tyrant of Padua. This same play formed the basis of Saverio Mercadante's Il giuramento of 1837, Amilcare Ponchielli's La Gioconda, which premiered in the same year as Cui's opera (1876), and Alfred Bruneau's Angelo, tyran de Padoue of 1928.

== Performance history ==
Angelo was premiered on 1 February 1876 in Saint Petersburg at the Mariinsky Theatre. The conductor was Eduard Nápravník. Apparently it did not survive that particular season, and was removed from the repertory.

A new production of Angelo was staged twenty-five years after the original premiere in 1901 at the Bolshoi Theatre in Moscow, with Feodor Chaliapin in the role of Galeofa. The Mariinsky staged Angelo again in 1910.

== Roles ==
- Angelo Malipieri, podesta: bass
- Catarina Bragadini: soprano
- Tisbe: mezzo-soprano
- Rodolfo: tenor
- Anafesta Galeofa, Tisbe's factotum, Angelo's spy: bass
- Ascanio Strozzi: bass
- Dafne [=2nd Masker]: mezzo-soprano
- 1st Sbirro: baritone
- 2nd Sbirro: bass
- Fra Paolo: tenor
- Peppo: tenor
- A Servant: non-singing role
- Patricians, signore, people, sbirri, etc.: chorus

Setting: Padua, 1549.

== Synopsis ==
=== Act 1 ===
In Tisbe's illuminated garden, masked guests entertain themselves. After they disperse, Rodolfo and the conspirators in the grotto complain about Angelo. The guests come back. Galeofa knows who Rodolfo is, and will help him to meet Catarina, his paramour, that night.

Tisbe enters. She is in love with Rodolfo, and would kill any rival for his love. In an aside, he admits to loving only Catarina, and leaves. Galeofa reappears, and gives Tisbe a bottle of poison and a bottle of sleeping potion. He tells her that Rodolfo will be meeting another woman that night.

Angelo arrives to the greeting sounds of a barcarolle. In order to assuage his jealousy of her attentions to Galeofa, she tells him of the time when her mother was rescued years ago from hanging when Tisbe was a child. The daughter of a Venetian nobleman had pleaded to spare Tisbe's mother, and in gratitude the latter gave the girl her crucifix. Tisbe has been searching for that person ever since.

=== Act 2 ===
In her bedroom, Catarina awaits Rodolfo. The chambermaids try to cheer her up by singing, but it does not help. Alone, Catarina then tries to cheer herself up by playing Rodolfo's sad song, and suddenly he is heard singing it from the balcony. After their love scene a noise is heard and Rodolfo hides. It is Tisbe; although she doesn't know who Catarina's lover is, she calls for Angelo to tell him about the Catarina's affair. As Catarina prays before the crucifix, Tisbe notices that it is the one her mother once had.

When Angelo enters, Tisbe invents a story about a plot to assassinate Angelo. Aside, she promises Catarina a means to escape with Rodolfo.

=== Act 3 ===
Outside a tavern by the river at dusk the crowd is entertained with a tarantella. The subject of the Venetian tyrant comes up, and people are persuaded join the plot to assassinate him. Rodolfo enters, reporting that Galeofa has betrayed them. When the latter enters, the crowd mortally wounds him. After Angelo and his troops come on the scene, Galeofa gives Angelo an unsigned letter to Catarina from a young man, then dies. The rebellion is defeated.

=== Act 4 ===
Tableau 1: in Catarina's room Angelo explains to the priest how Catarina's funeral should be arranged. The two exit, and Tisbe appears, suspecting that Rodolfo is Catarina's lover. When Angelo returns and shows her the love letter, Tisbe knows that the handwriting is Rodolfo's, but pretends otherwise. She convinces Angelo that he should poison Catarina, not behead her, and goes to fetch the poison.

Angelo tells Catarina that her life will be spared if she reveals the identity of her lover. Alone, Catarina discovers the block and axe that are hidden behind a curtain.

Tisbe, accompanied by Angelo, brings a phial, which Catarina refuses to drink from. At Tisbe's urging, she drinks it, admitting her chaste love. Angelo tells his servants to take Catarina's body away to the crypt, but, after he leaves, Tisbe bribes them to do otherwise.

Tableau 2: In Tisbe's bedroom

Catarina lies covered by a shroud. The grave has been sealed, and the horses outside are ready for the escape. Rodolfo appears, convinced that Tisbe poisoned Catarina, and stabs Tisbe in the heart. Catarina awakes; Tisbe blesses them and dies as the funeral procession passes by the window to the strains of "De profundis."

== Notable excerpts ==
- Introduction
- Tisbe's Narrative (Act I)
- Barcarolle (Act I)
- Rodolfo's Song (Act II)

== Bibliography ==
- Bernandt, G.B. Словарь опер впервые поставленных или изданных в дореволюционной России и в СССР, 1736-1959 [Dictionary of Operas First Performed or Published in Pre-Revolutionary Russia and in the USSR, 1836-1959] (Москва: Советский композитор, 1962), pp. 21–22.
- Cui, César. Анджело: опера в четырех действиях. Фортепианное переложение с пением. [Angelo: opera in four acts, piano-vocal score]. St. Petersburg: W. Bessel, 1876.
- Mercy-Argenteau, Comtesse de. César Cui: esquisse critique. Paris: Fischbacher, 1888.
- Nazarov, A.F. Цезарь Антонович Кюи [Cezar' Antonovič Kjui]. Moskva: Muzyka, 1989.
- Taruskin, Richard. Opera and Drama in Russia As Preached and Practiced in the 1860s. New ed. Rochester: University of Rochester Press, 1993.
