= Mademoiselle Fifi (opera) =

Opera by César Cui

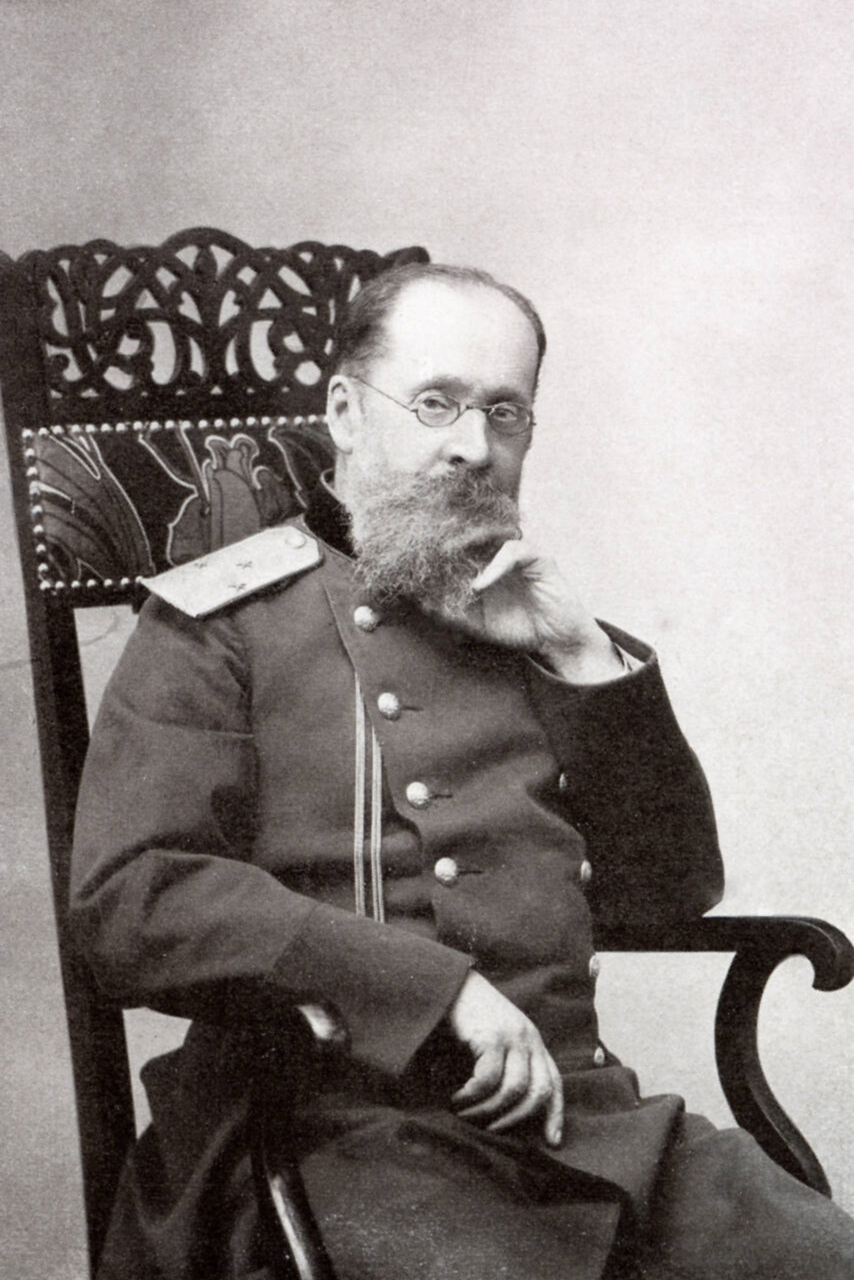
Composer César Cui

Mademoiselle Fifi (Мадмуазель Фифи in Cyrillic; Madmuazel' Fifi in transliteration) is an opera in one act, composed by César Cui during 1902–1903. The libretto was adapted by the composer from the short story Mademoiselle Fifi (1882) by Guy de Maupassant and the dramatized version Mlle Fifi (1896) by Oscar Méténier.

The opera was premiered on 4 November 1903 (Old Style) at the Hermitage Theatre by the Moscow Private Opera. During its performing history it was also known under the title Женщина из Руана [Ženščina iz Ruana) = The Woman from Rouen]. The opera was widely performed in Imperial Russia and had special significance during World War I, largely because of its patriotic connotations in the struggle against Germany. Despite this success and an adaptation produced during World War II, this opera seems not to have remained in the standard operatic repertoire afterwards in Russia and not to have been performed in the West.

In the music for the opera Cui borrows some French and German tunes, including the tune of the refrain from "Die Wacht am Rhein" for the German soldiers.

== Characters and setting ==
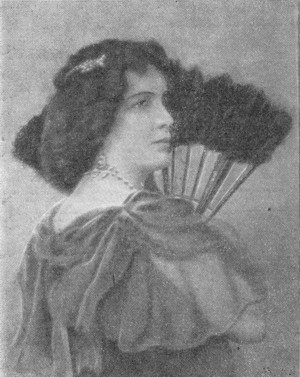
Tsvetkova in the role of Rachel

- Major Farlsberg: bass
- Captain Kelweingstein: baritone
- Lieutenant Otto Grossling: bass
- Lieutenant Fritz Scheunaubourg: tenor
- 2nd Lieutenant von Eyrik (Mademoiselle Fifi): tenor
- Pflicht, a factotum: baritone
- Curé Chantavoine: baritone
- Sexton: tenor
- Rachel: soprano
- Eva: soprano
- Blondine: mezzo-soprano
- Pamela: alto
- Amanda: mezzo-soprano
- (Also needed: Soldiers, servants)

Setting: 1871. The Château d'Uville, near Rouen.

== Synopsis ==
On a rainy day during the Franco-Prussian War, German soldiers occupying a château in France send for some "ladies" from the nearby town. When they arrive, the men and women are paired up, and all sit down to dinner. Von Eyrik ("Fifi") taunts Rachel, his assigned companion. Some light German and French songs are sung as entertainment. Then Rachel sings a patriotic song, provoking Fifi to boast that Germany will conquer not only France, but also her women. Rachel stabs him and escapes. Fifi dies, and prayers are said for him as the nearby church bells toll.

== Notable musical excerpts ==
These were separately issued by the publisher (P. Jurgenson):

- The Abbé's Arioso
- The Captain's Little Song
- Quartet [based on a song by Marschner]
- Amanda's Song [based on a folksong from the Metz region of France]
- Rachel's song

== Bibliography ==
Bernandt, G.B. Словарь опер впервые поставленных или изданных в дореволюционной России и в СССР, 1736-1959 [Dictionary of Operas First Performed or Published in Pre-Revolutionary Russia and in the USSR, 1836-1959]. Москва: Советский композитор, 1962, pp. 170–171.

Cui, César. Мадмуазель Фифи: опера в одном действии [Mademoiselle Fifi: opera in one act]. Pour chant et piano Moscou: Jurgenson, 1903.

Nazarov, A.F. Цезарь Антонович Кюи [Cesar Antonovich Cui]. Moskva: Muzyka, 1989.
