= A Feast in Time of Plague =

Play by Alexander Pushkin

A Feast in Time of Plague (Russian: «Пир во время чумы», romanized: Pir vo vremya chumy) is an 1830 play by Alexander Pushkin. The plot concerns a banquet in which the central figure taunts death with a toast "And so, O Plague, we hail thy reign!". The story is based on 4th scene of Act 1 of John Wilson's play The City of Plague (1816).

The play was written in 1830 and published in 1832 as one of four Little Tragedies (Malenkie tragedii, Russian: Маленькие трагедии) together with The Stone Guest (Kamenny gost', Russian: Каменный гость); Mozart and Salieri (Motsart i Salyeri, Russian: Моцарт и Сальери) and The Miserly Knight (Skupoy rytsar, Russian: Скупой рыцарь). All four of these plays were set as one act operas by Russian composers; Dargomyzhsky, Rimsky-Korsakov, Rachmaninov, and for the Feast, César Cui.

== See also ==
- "The Masque of the Red Death"
