= Puss in Boots (opera) =

1915 opera by César Cui

- by César Cui
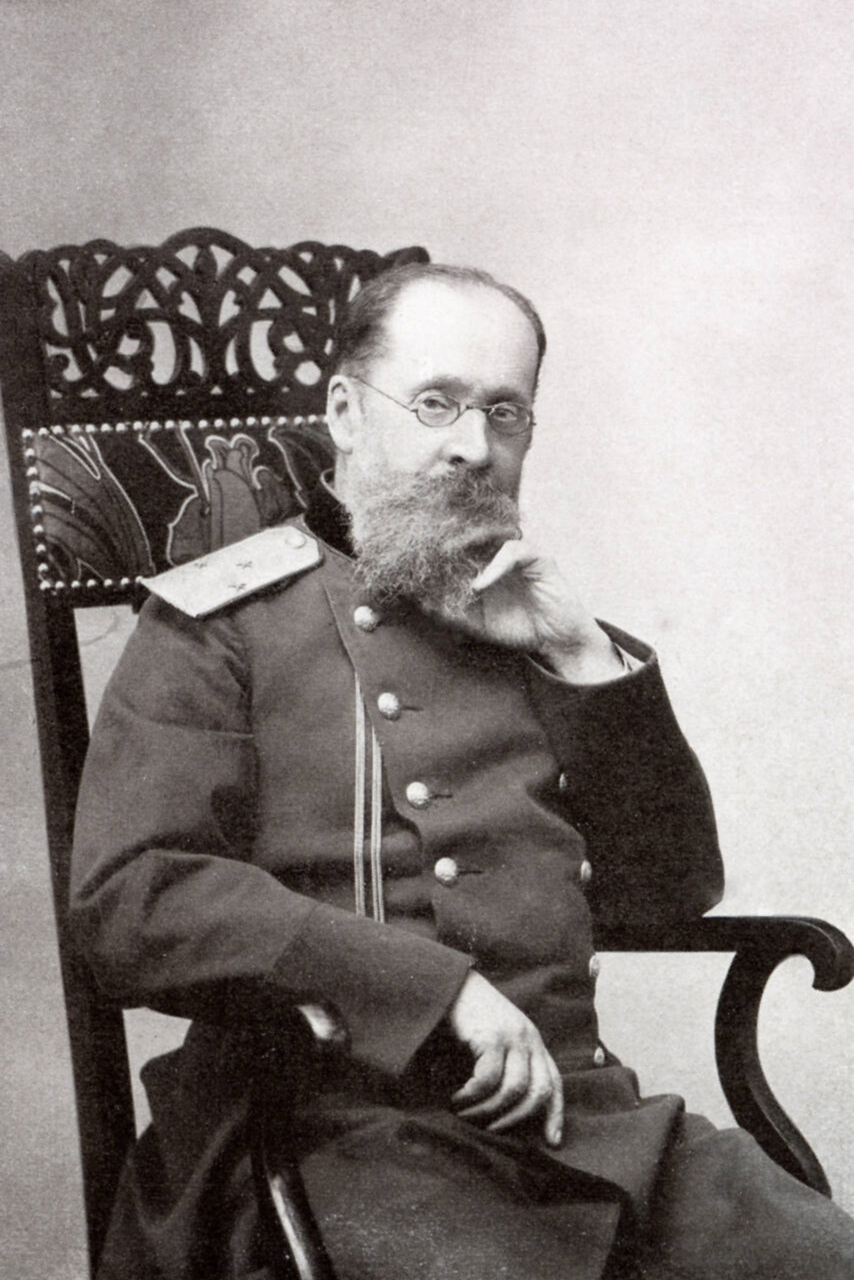
- Composer César Cui
- Native title: Il gatto con gli stivali
- Librettist: Marina Stanislavovna Pol'
- Language: Italian
- Premiere: 1915; Teatro dei Piccoli, Rome

Puss in Boots (Russian: Кот в сапогах, romanized: Kot v sapogakh) is a short fairytale opera for children in three acts, four tableaux, composed by César Cui in 1913. The libretto was written by Marina Stanislavovna Pol'. It was premiered in Rome at the Teatro dei Piccoli in 1915 under the title Il gatto con gli stivali and ran for fifty performances. A Soviet edition of the opera, with a revised libretto, was published in 1961. In 1978 the opera was staged in Potsdam, then East Germany, as Der gestiefelte Kater. The first production in West Germany was in the early 1989s in Nuremberg. It was performed in the 1997/98 season at the Staatsoper Stuttgart, directed by Klaus Zehelein and Ulrich Lenz, and recorded on CD in 1999 in a version with spoken dialogue designed for radio.

== Characters ==
- The Cat
- Jean, youngest son of the miller; he becomes the Marquis de Carabas
- Middle Son of the miller
- Oldest Son of the miller
- King
- Princess, daughter of the King
- The Ogre
- The Princess' girlfriends, courtiers, reapers, hay-makers, ogre's servants (chorus)

== Plot ==
The plot follows very closely the fairy-tale by Charles Perrault, with an instrumental introduction and inserted dances.

== Discography ==
- Puss in Boots: Opera Fairy-tale by César Cui in a performance from the All-Union Radio in 1948 – Puss: Pavel Pontryagin (singing)/Nikolai Litvinov (spoken); Jean: Georgy Vinogradov; The middle son of the miller: Alexei Usmanov; The eldest son of the miller: Daniil Demyanov; The King: Georgy Abramov; The Princess: Zoya Muratova; The Cannibal: Konstantin Polyaev; conducted by Leonid Pyatigorsky / Published by Aquarius Classic 2018
- Der gestiefelte Kater: Märchenoper von César Cui in der Hörspielfassung von Linde von Keyserlingk. Fassung für Kammerorchester: Andreas Breitscheid. Koproduction: Junge Oper der Staatsoper Stuttgart / Südwestrundfunk / Patmos Verlag, Düsseldorf, 1999. Patmos CD, 3-491-88764-X.
