= The Mandarin's Son =

Opera by César Cui

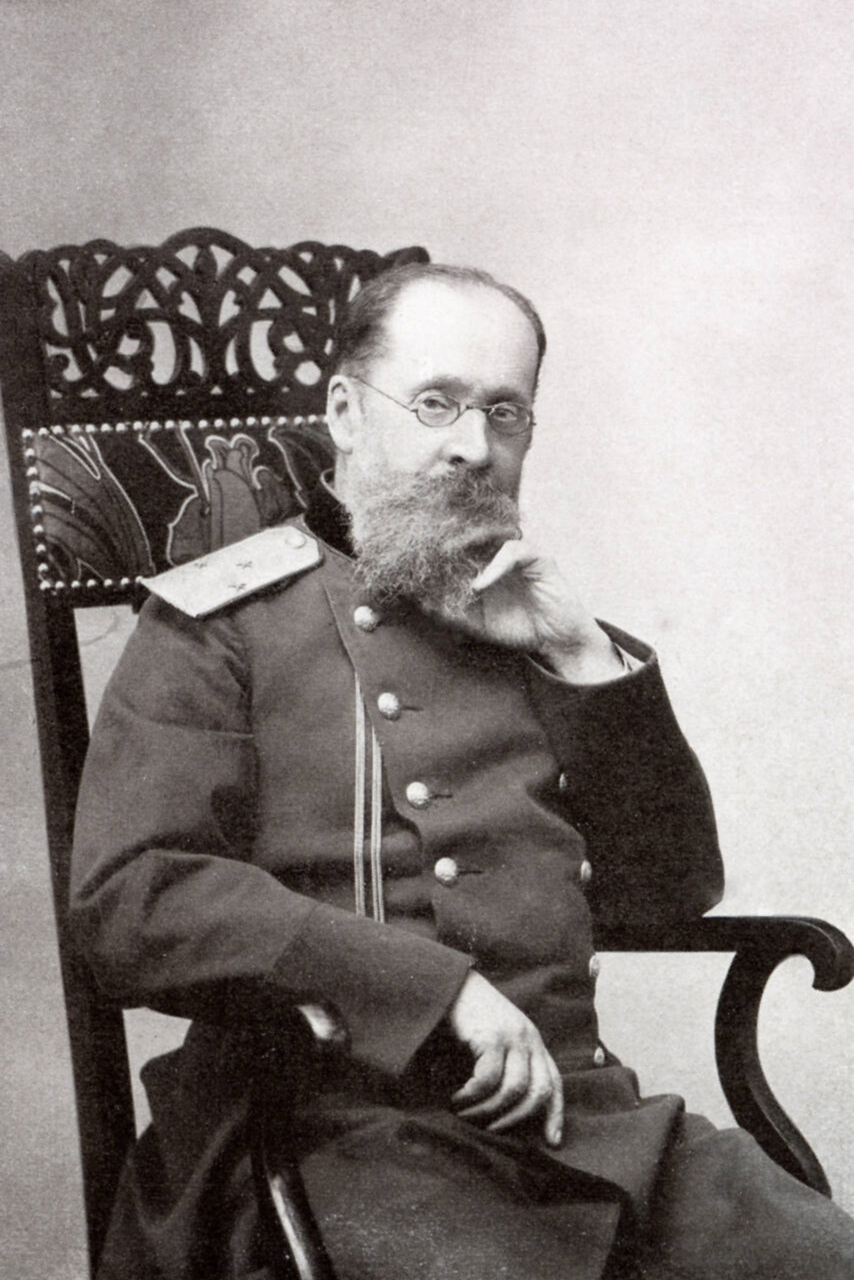
Composer César Cui

The Mandarin's Son (Сын мандарина in Cyrillic; Syn mandarina in transliteration) is comic opera in one act by César Cui, composed in 1859. The libretto, which includes spoken dialogue, was written by Viktor Krylov.

No small influence for this work came from the French composer Daniel Auber, particularly his Le cheval de bronze, which had a similar setting, and was being performed in Saint Petersburg at the time.

Cui dedicated this opera to his bride, Mal'vina Bamberg. (They had married the previous year.) The orchestration is credited to Mily Balakirev.

== Performance history ==
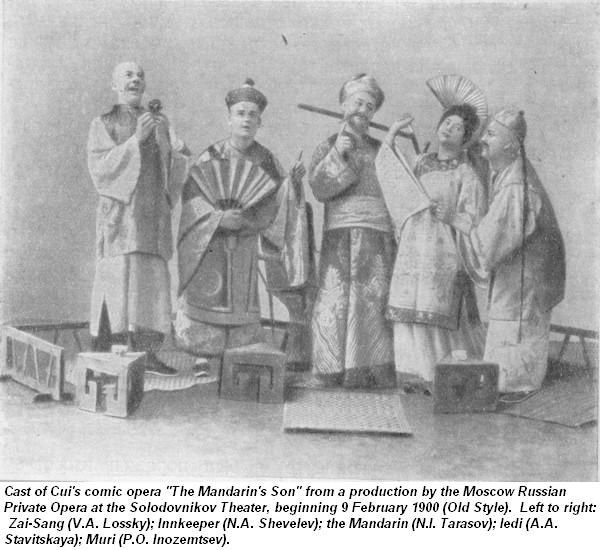
The cast of a production of The Mandarin's Son from 1900

The first performance of The Mandarin's Son was "domestic," so to speak. It occurred on 22 February 1859 at the apartment of Cui's in-laws in Saint Petersburg, with piano accompaniment. The cast for this performance included Mussorgsky in the role of the Mandarin and Mal'vina as the Innkeeper's daughter.

The first public performance was given on 7 December 1878 in St. Petersburg, by the Клуб художников [Artists' Club]. Thereafter it proved to be one of the few operas by Cui that was popular in Imperial Russia. Soon after the composer's death, however, the opera seemed to have disappeared from the repertory in Russia. It was revived, however, in 1998 by the Pokrovsky Chamber Music Theater in Moscow in a modified production.

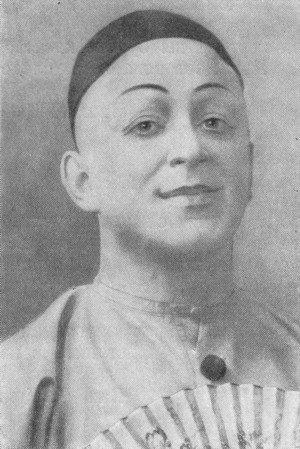
Sobinov as Muri, probably 1901-1902

== Roles ==
Role	Voice type	Premiere Cast, 22 February 1859 (piano accompaniment performed by Cui and Balakirev)
Kau-Tsing, the mandarin	bass	Modest Musorgsky
Zinzingu, the Innkeeper	baritone	P. I. Gumbin
Iedi, his daughter	soprano	Malʹvina Rafailovna Cui
Muri, his servant	tenor	Ia. I. Chernyavsky
Zai-Sang, his other servant	bass	N. N. Velʹyaminov

== Synopsis ==
Place: At an inn in China

The innkeeper discovers that his daughter, Iedi, is interested in his servant Muri, whereupon he tells Muri to leave. In the meantime, the Mandarin has arrived, searching for his long-lost son, who turns out to be Muri.

== Bibliography ==
- Bernandt, G.B. Словарь опер впервые поставленных или изданных в дореволюционной России и в СССР, 1736-1959 [Dictionary of Operas First Performed or Published in Pre-Revolutionary Russia and in the USSR, 1836-1959]. Москва: Советский композитор, 1962, p. 288.
- Cui, César. Сын мандарина: комическая опера в одном действии [The Mandarin's Son: comic opera in one act]. Ст.-Петербург: А. Битнер, 1859.
- _______. Le fils du mandarin: opéra comique en un acte. Réduction pour chant et piano. Leipzig: Rahter, 1888.
- Krylov, V.A. "Композитор Ц.А. Кюи (отрывок из воспоминание)," Прозаические сочинения в двух томах, т. 2 ["The Composer C.A. Cui (Fragment from Reminiscences)," Prose Works in Two Volumes, v. 2]. С. Петербург, 1908, pp. 289-300.
- Nazarov, A.F. Цезарь Антонович Кюи [Cezar' Antonovič Kjui]. Moskva: Muzyka, 1989.
