= César Cui =

Russian composer and army officer (1835–1918)

- Цезарь Кюи
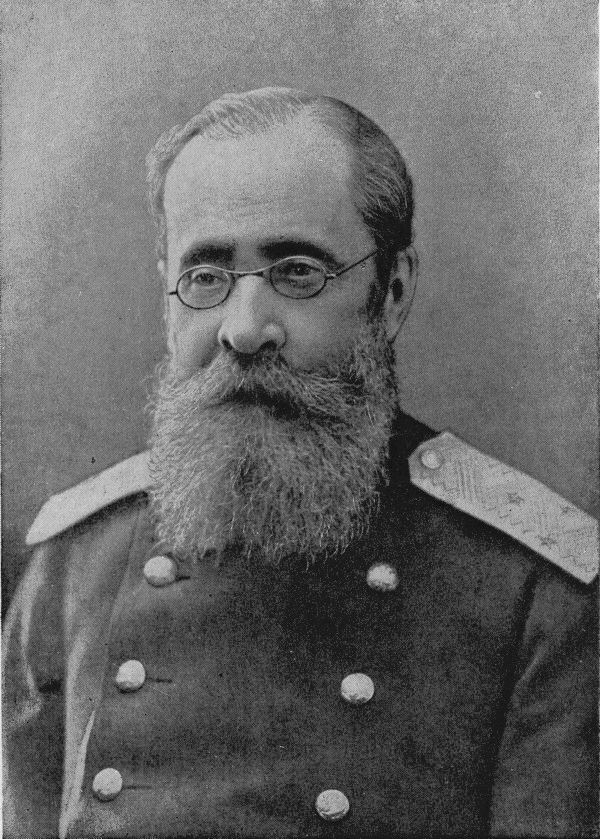
- Cui in 1910
- Born: Cesarius-Benjaminus Cui; 18 January 1835; Vilna, Russian Empire
- Died: 26 March 1918 (aged 83); Petrograd, Russian SFSR
- Burial place: Tikhvin Cemetery, Saint Petersburg
- Notable work: List of compositions; List of literary works
- Military career
- Branch: Imperial Russian Army
- Rank: Engineer-general
- Conflicts: Russo-Turkish War (1877–1878)

César Antonovich Cui (Russian: Цезарь Антонович Кюи, romanized: Tsezar Antonovich Kyui; (Note: The BGN/PCGN transliteration of Russian is used for his name here. ALA-LC system: T͡sezarʹ Antonovich Ki͡ui, ISO 9 system: Cezarʹ Antonovič Kûi. Latin: Caesar Antonii filius Cui.) IPA: [ˈt͡sjezərʲ ɐnˈtonəvʲɪt͡ɕ kʲʊˈi]; French: Cesarius Benjaminus Cui; 18 January [O.S. 6 January] 1835 – 26 March 1918) was a Russian composer and music critic, member of the Belyayev circle and The Five – a group of composers gathered by the idea of creating a specifically Russian type of music. As an officer of the Imperial Russian Army, he rose to the rank of engineer-general (equivalent to full general), taught fortifications in Russian military academies and wrote a number of monographs on the subject.

== Biography ==
=== Upbringing and career ===
Cesarius-Benjaminus Cui was born in Vilna in the Russian Empire (present-day Vilnius, Lithuania) into a Catholic family of French and Polish–Lithuanian descent, the youngest of five children. The original French spelling of his surname was "Queuille." His French father, Antoine (Anton Leonardovich) Cui, entered Russia with Napoleon's army; in 1812, he was injured during the battle near Smolensk and (following the defeat) would settle in Vilna. He married local noblewoman Julia Gucewicz; some sources indicate that her father was the Lithuanian architect Laurynas Gucevičius.

The young César grew up learning French, Polish, Russian and Lithuanian. As a secondary school (gymnasium) student in Vilan, he took music lessons with Stanisław Moniuszko in 1850. Later that year, before completing his gymnasium education, Cui was sent to Saint Petersburg to prepare to enter the Chief Engineering School, which he did the following year at age 16. In 1855, he graduated from the academy; following advanced studies at the Nikolaevsky Engineering Academy (now Military Engineering-Technical University), he began his military career in 1857 as an instructor in fortifications. His students over the decades included several members of the Imperial family, most notably Nicholas II. Cui eventually ended up teaching at three of the military academies in Saint Petersburg. Cui's study of fortifications gained from a frontline assignment during the Russo-Turkish War of 1877–1878 proved important to his career. As an expert on military fortifications, Cui eventually attained the academic rank of professor in 1880 and the military rank of general in 1906. His writings on fortifications included textbooks that were widely used, in several successive editions (see bibliography below).

=== A vocational life in music ===
Despite his achievements as a professional military academic, Cui is best known in the West for his 'other' life in music. As a boy in Vilna, he received piano lessons, studied Chopin's works, and began composing little pieces at fourteen years of age. In the few months before he was sent to Petersburg, he managed to have some lessons in music theory with the Polish composer Stanisław Moniuszko, who was residing in Vilna at the time. Cui's musical direction changed in 1856, when he met Mily Balakirev and began to be more seriously involved with music.

Even though he was composing music and writing music criticism in his spare time, Cui turned out to be an extremely prolific composer and feuilletonist. His public "debut" as a composer occurred in 1859 with the performance of his orchestral Scherzo, Op. 1, under the baton of Anton Rubinstein and the auspices of the Russian Musical Society. In 1869, the first public performance of an opera by Cui took place, William Ratcliff (based on the tragedy by Heinrich Heine); it did not ultimately have success, partially because of the harshness of his own writings in the music press. All but one of his operas were composed to Russian texts; the one exception, Le flibustier (based on a play by Jean Richepin), premiered in 1894 at the Opéra-Comique in Paris (twenty-five years after Ratcliff), but it did not succeed either. Cui's more successful stage works during his lifetime were the one-act comic opera The Mandarin's Son (premiered publicly in 1878), the three-act The Prisoner of the Caucasus (1883) (based on Pushkin), and the one-act Mademoiselle Fifi (1903) (based on Guy de Maupassant). Besides Flibustier, the only other operas by Cui performed in his lifetime outside of the Russian Empire were The Prisoner of the Caucasus (in Liège, 1886; the first time any opera by The Five was performed outside Russia, but this was also its sole performance outside Russia) and the children's opera Puss in Boots (in Rome, 1915).

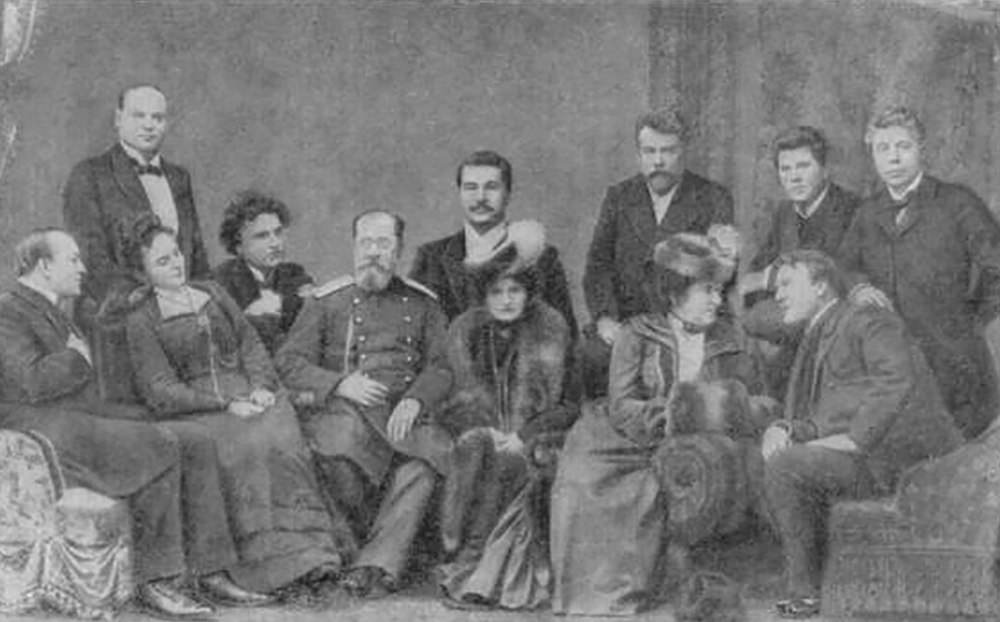
Cui among artists of the Moscow Bolshoi Theatre, 1902

Cui's activities in musical life also included membership on the opera selection committee at the Mariinsky Theatre; this stint ended in 1883, when both he and Rimsky-Korsakov left the committee in protest of its rejection of Mussorgsky's Khovanshchina. From 1896 to 1904, he was director of the Petersburg branch of the Russian Musical Society.

Among the many musicians Cui knew in his life, Franz Liszt looms large. His book, La musique en Russie, and his Suite pour piano, Op. 21, are dedicated to the elder composer. Cui's Tarantelle for orchestra, Op. 12, formed the basis for Liszt's last piano transcription. In addition, Liszt valued the music of Russian composers quite highly; for Cui's opera William Ratcliff, he expressed some of the highest praise.

Two personalities of direct significance for Cui were women who were specially devoted to his music. In Belgium, the Comtesse de Mercy-Argenteau (1837–1890) was most influential in making possible the staging of The Prisoner of the Caucasus there in 1885. In Moscow, Mariya Kerzina, with her husband Arkadiy Kerzin, formed a performance society in 1896 called the Circle of Russian Music Lovers, which began in 1898 to give special place to works by Cui (among those of other Russian composers) in its concerts.

Throughout his rather long and active musical life, Cui won many accolades. In the late 1880s and early 1890s, several foreign musical societies honored Cui with memberships. Shortly after the staging of Le flibustier in Paris, Cui was elected as a correspondent member of the Académie Française and was awarded the cross of the Légion d'honneur. In 1896, he was made a member of the Belgian Royal Academy of Literature and Art. In 1909 and 1910, events were held in honor of Cui's 50th anniversary as a composer.

=== Family ===
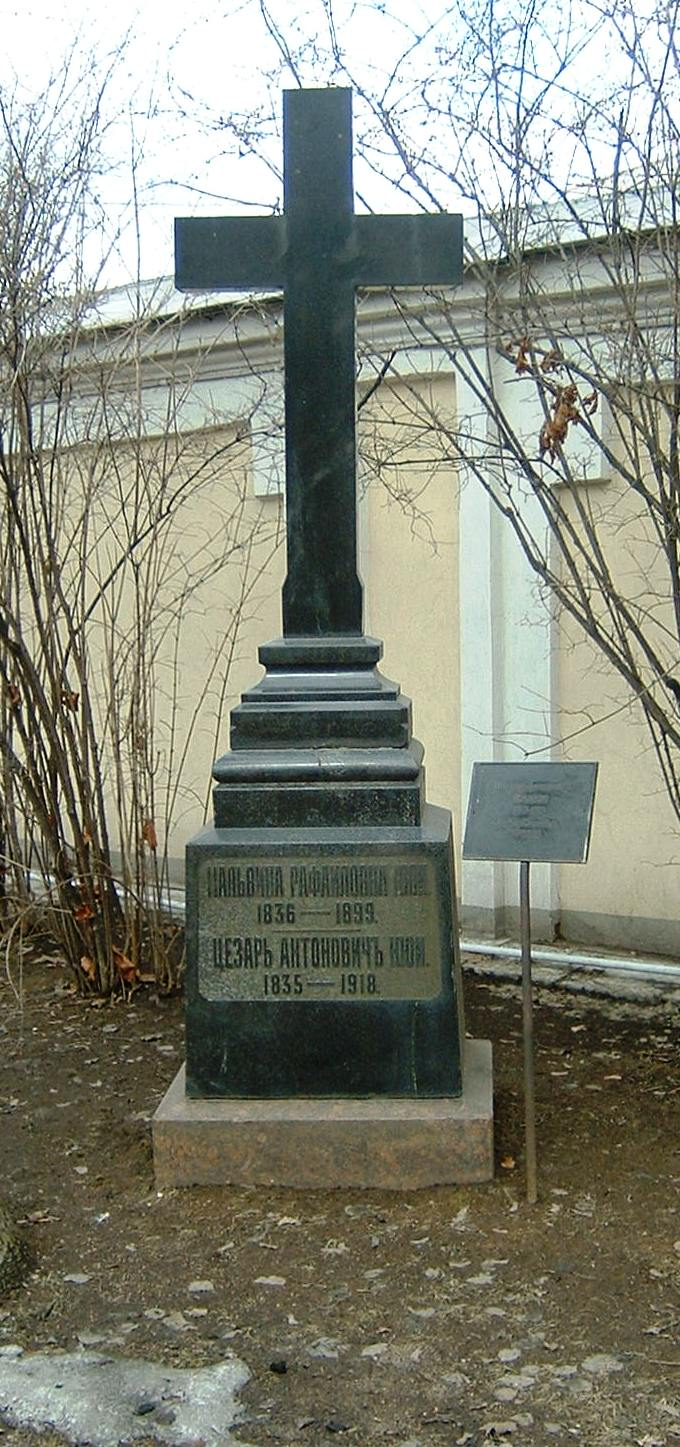
Grave of Malvina and César Cui, Tikhvin Cemetery, Saint Petersburg

Cui married Malvina Rafailovna Bamberg (Russian: Мальвина Рафаиловна Бамберг pronounced [mɐlʲˈvʲinə rəfɐˈiɫəvnə ˈbam⁽ʲ⁾bʲɪrk]) in 1858. He had met her at the home of Alexander Dargomyzhsky, from whom she was taking singing lessons. Among the musical works Cui dedicated to her is the early Scherzo, Op. 1 (1857), which uses themes based on her maiden name (BAmBErG) and his own initials (C. C.), and the comic opera The Mandarin's Son. César and Malvina had two children, Lidiya and Aleksandr. Lidiya, an amateur singer, married and had a son named Yuri Borisovich Amoretti; in the period before the October Revolution, Aleksandr was a member of the Russian Senate.

=== Last years and death ===
In 1916, Cui went blind, although he was still able to compose small pieces by means of dictation. He died on 26 March 1918 from cerebral apoplexy and was buried next to his wife Mal'vina (who had died in 1899) at the Smolensky Lutheran Cemetery in Petrograd (now Saint Petersburg). He was the longest lived member of the five and had been the group's last living member since Balakirev's death in 1910. In 1939, his body was reinterred in Tikhvin Cemetery at the Alexander Nevsky Monastery, to lie beside the other members of The Five.

== Cui as a music critic ==
As a writer on music, Cui contributed almost 800 articles to various newspapers and other publications in Russia and Europe between 1864 and 1918 (he "retired" from regular music criticism in 1900). His wide coverage included concerts, recitals, musical life, new publications of music, and personalities. A significant number of his articles (ca. 300) dealt with opera. Several of his themed sets of articles were reissued as monographs; these covered topics as varied as the original 1876 production of Wagner's Der Ring des Nibelungen in Bayreuth, the development of the Russian romance art song, music in Russia, and Anton Rubinstein's seminal lectures on the history of piano music of 1888–1889 (see list of writings below). In addition, as indicated above as part of his profession, Cui also published many books and articles about military fortifications.

Because of rules related to his status in the Russian military, in the early years his musico-critical articles had to be published under a pseudonym, which consisted of three asterisks (***); in Petersburg musical circles, however, it became clear who was writing the articles. His musical reviews began in the St. Petersburg Vedomosti, expressing disdain for music before Beethoven (such as Mozart) and his advocacy of originality in music. Sarcasm was a regular feature of his feuilletons.

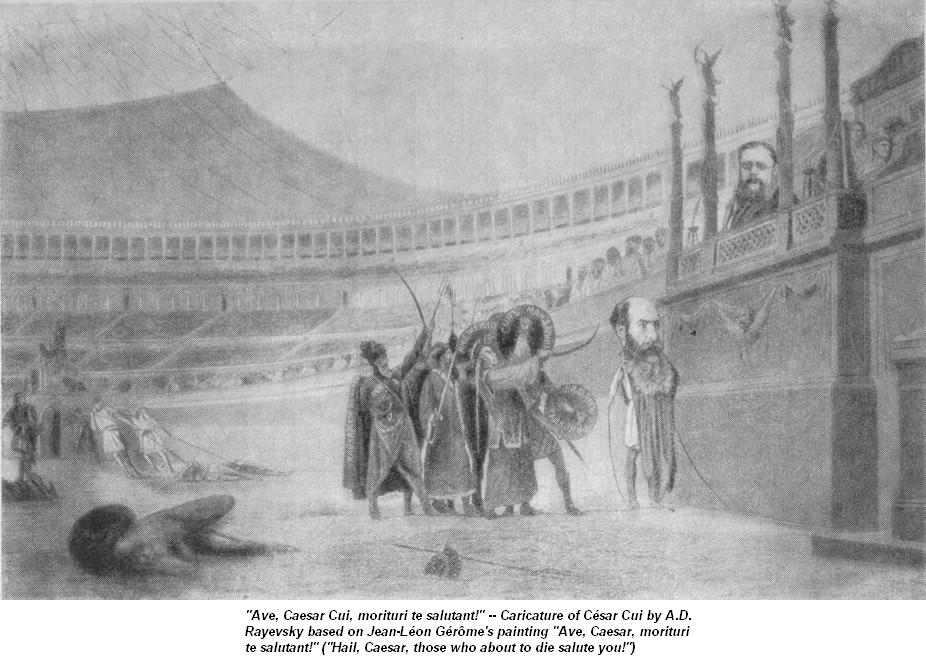
Caricature of Cui by Rayevsky, based on a painting by Jean-Léon Gérôme. The gladiators in the center bear shields inscribed with the titles of Cui's operas William Ratcliff, The Mandarin's Son, and Angelo.

Cui's primary goal as a critic was to promote the music of contemporary Russian composers, especially the works of his now better-known co-members of The Five. Even they, however, were not spared negative reactions from him here and there, especially in his blistering review of the first production of Mussorgsky's Boris Godunov in 1874. Later in life, Cui championed the music of this late colleague of his to the point of making the first completion of Mussorgsky's unfinished opera The Fair at Sorochyntsi.

Russian composers outside of The Five, however, were often more likely to produce a negative reaction. This derived at least partly from distrust of the Western-style conservatory system in favor of the autodidactic approach that The Five had practiced. For instance, Cui lambasted Tchaikovsky's second performed opera, The Oprichnik, and his stinging remarks about Rachmaninoff's Symphony No.1 are often cited; fortunately, both works have survived their unfavorable premieres for posterity.

Of Western composers, Cui favored Berlioz and Liszt as progressives. He admired Wagner's aspirations concerning music drama, but did not agree with that composer's methods to achieve them (such as the leitmotif system and the predominance of the orchestra).

Late in life, Cui's presumed progressiveness (as espoused in the 1860s and '70s) faded, and he showed firm hostility towards the younger "modernists" such as Richard Strauss and Vincent d'Indy. Cui's last published articles (from 1917) constituted merciless parodies, including the little song "Hymn to Futurism" and "Concise Directions on How to Become a Modern Composer of Genius without Being a Musician".

== Cui as a composer ==
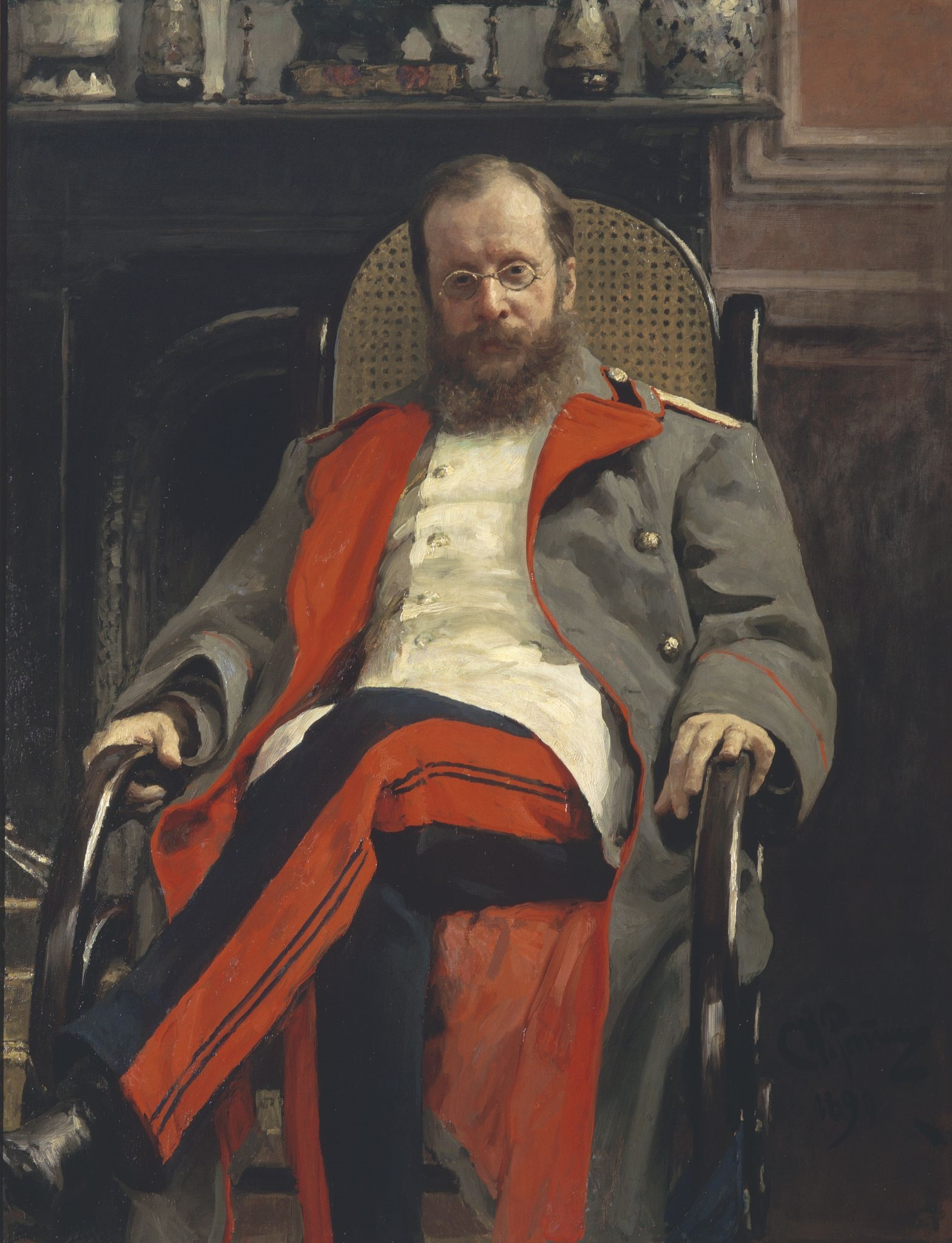
Portrait of César Cui by Ilya Repin, 1890, (Tretyakov Gallery)

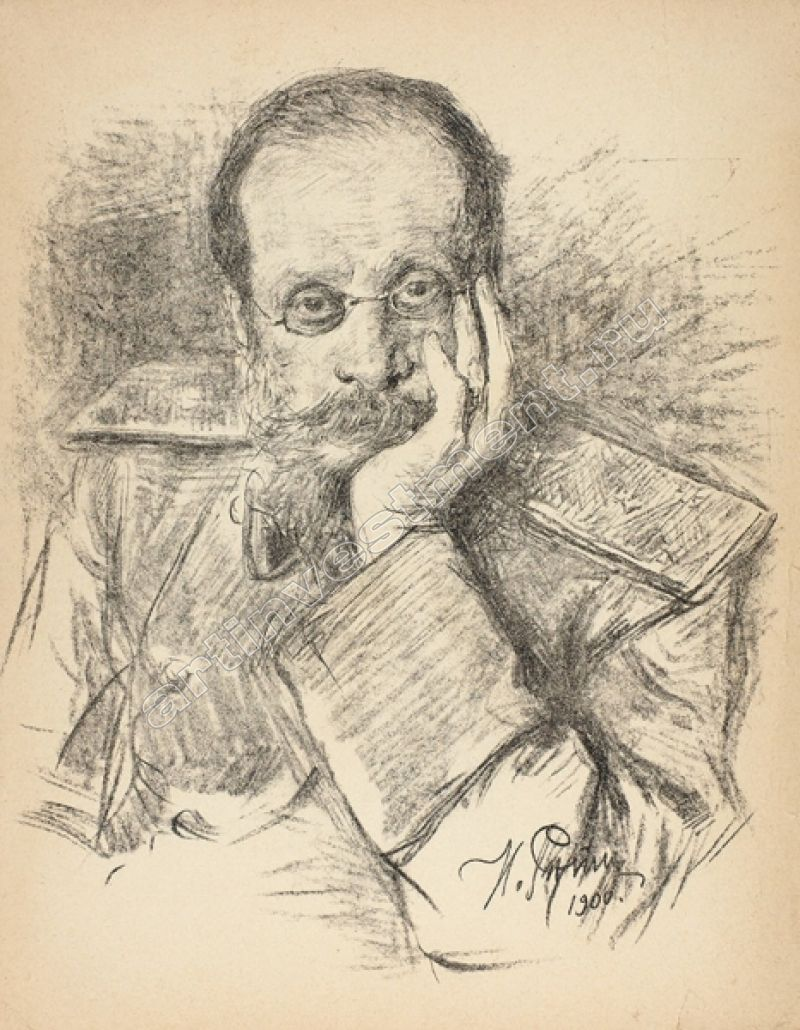
Portrait of Cesar Cui by Ilya Repin (sketch), 1900

Cui composed in almost all genres of his time, with the distinct exceptions of the symphony, symphonic poem and the solo concerto (unlike his compatriots Balakirev, Borodin, Mussorgsky and Rimsky-Korsakov). Art songs, including many children's songs and some vocal duets, have a prominent place in Cui's catalogue. Several of his songs are available also in versions with orchestral accompaniment, including his Bolero, Op. 17, which was dedicated to the singer Marcella Sembrich. Some of his most famous art songs include "The Statue at Tsarskoye Selo" ("Царскосельская статyя") and "The Burnt Letter," ("Сожжённое письмо"), both based on poems by Cui's most valued poet, Alexander Pushkin.

In addition, Cui wrote many works for piano and for chamber groups (including three string quartets), numerous choruses, and several orchestral works, but his most significant efforts are reflected in the operas, of which he composed fifteen of varying proportions. Besides children's music (which includes four fairytale operas as well as the aforementioned songs), three other special categories of compositions stand out among his works: pieces inspired by and dedicated to the Comtesse de Mercy-Argenteau (whom the composer knew from 1885 to her death in 1890), works associated with the Circle of Russian Music Lovers (the "Kerzin Circle"), and pieces inspired by the Russo-Japanese War and World War I.

In the last few decades, Puss in Boots (from Perrault), one of the four children's operas he composed, has gained wide appeal in Germany. Nevertheless, despite the fact that more of Cui's music has been made available in recent years, both in recordings and in new printed editions, his status in today's repertoire is considerably limited, based (in the West) primarily on some of his piano and chamber music (such as the violin and piano piece Orientale (op. 50, No. 9)) and a number of solo songs. His abilities as an orchestrator have been disparaged, notably by his compatriot Rimsky-Korsakov. The received wisdom is that he is not a particularly talented composer, at least for large forms; his strongest talent is said to lie in the crystallization of mood at an instant as captured in his art songs and instrumental miniatures.

Cui's works are not so nationalistic as those of the other members of The Five; with the exception of Pushkin, his operas do not display a strong attraction to Russian sources. In the area of art song, however, the vast majority of Cui's vocal music is based on Russian texts. Overt attempts at Russian "folk" musical style can be detected in passages from his first act of the collaborative Mlada (1872), The Captain's Daughter, a couple of his children's operas, and a few songs; many other passages in his music reflect the stylistic curiosities associated with Russian art music of the 19th century, such as whole-tone scales and certain harmonic devices. Nevertheless, his style is more often compared to Robert Schumann and to French composers such as Gounod than to Mikhail Glinka or to Cui's Russian contemporaries.
