= List of operas by title =

The following is a list of operas and operettas with entries in Wikipedia. The entries are sorted alphabetically by title, with the name of the composer and the year of the first performance also given.

For a list of operas sorted by name of composer, see List of operas by composer.

== Alphabetical listing ==
=== 0–9 ===
- 1000 Airplanes on the Roof, Philip Glass, 1988
- 1492 epopea lirica d'America, Antonio Braga, 1992
- 1984, Lorin Maazel, 2005
- Le 66, Jacques Offenbach, 1856

=== A ===
- L'abandon d'Ariane, Darius Milhaud, 1928
- Abu Hassan, Carl Maria von Weber, 1811
- Acante et Céphise, Jean-Philippe Rameau, 1751
- Achille et Polyxène, Jean-Baptiste Lully, Pascal Collasse, 1687
- Acis and Galatea, George Frideric Handel, 1718
- Acis et Galatée, Jean-Baptiste Lully, 1686
- Actéon, Marc-Antoine Charpentier, 1683–1685
- Adelaide, Antonio Sartorio, 1672
- Adelaide di Borgogna, Gioachino Rossini, 1817
- Adelia, Gaetano Donizetti, 1841
- Adelson e Salvini, Vincenzo Bellini, 1825
- Admeto, Handel, 1727
- Adriana Lecouvreur, Francesco Cilea, 1902
- Adriana Mater, Kaija Saariaho, 2008
- The Adventures of Pinocchio, Jonathan Dove, 2007
- L'Africaine, Giacomo Meyerbeer, 1865
- After All!, Alfred Cellier, 1878
- Ages Ago, Frederic Clay, 1869
- Agrippina, Handel, 1709
- Die ägyptische Helena, Richard Strauss, 1928
- Aida, Giuseppe Verdi, 1871
- Ainadamar, Osvaldo Golijov, 2003
- Akhnaten, Philip Glass, 1984
- Alahor in Granata, Gaetano Donizetti, 1826
- Albert Herring, Britten, 1947
- Alceste, Gluck, 1767
- Alceste, Handel, 1750
- Alceste, Lully, 1674
- Alcina, Handel, 1735
- Alessandro, Handel, 1726
- Alessandro nelle Indie, Pacini, 1824
- Alexander Twice, Martinů, 1964
- Alzira, Verdi, 1845
- Amadis, Lully, 1684
- Amadis, Massenet, 1922
- Amahl and the Night Visitors, Menotti, 1951
- An American Tragedy, Picker, 2005
- Amelia, Hagen, 2010
- L'amico Fritz, Pietro Mascagni, 1891
- L'Amour de loin, Kaija Saariaho, 2000
- Andrea Chénier, Giordano, 1896
- L'Ange de Nisida, Donizetti, 1839
- Angelo, Cui, 1876
- Aniara, Blomdahl, 1959
- Anna Bolena, Donizetti, 1830
- Anna Nicole, Mark-Anthony Turnage, 2011
- Antigonae, Orff, 1949
- Apollo et Hyacinthus, Wolfgang Amadeus Mozart, 1767
- Aquarius, Karel Goeyvaerts, 2009
- Arabella, Richard Strauss, 1933
- Ariadne auf Naxos, R. Strauss, 1912
- Ariodante, Handel, 1734
- Arizona Lady, Emmerich Kálmán, 1954
- L'arlesiana, Cilea, 1897
- Armida, Dvořák, 1904
- Armida, Rossini, 1817
- Armide, Gluck, 1777
- Armide, Lully, 1686
- Aroldo, Verdi, 1857
- Artamene, Tomaso Albinoni, 1741
- Les arts florissants, Charpentier, 1685
- Ascanio in Alba, Mozart, 1771
- Assassinio nella cattedrale, Pizzetti, 1958
- Atmen gibt das Leben, Stockhausen, 1977
- Attila, Verdi, 1846
- Atys, Lully, 1676
- Aufstieg und Fall der Stadt Mahagonny, Weill, 1930
- Azara, Paine, 1903

=== B ===
- Babes in Toyland, Herbert, 1903
- Babylon, Widmann, 2012
- Die Bajadere, Kálmán, 1921
- Un ballo in maschera, Verdi, 1859
- Bandanna, Hagen, 1998
- Bang!, Rutter, 1975
- Der Barbier von Bagdad, Cornelius, 1858
- Il barbiere di Siviglia, Rossini, 1816
- The Baron Kinkvervankotsdorsprakingatchdern, Arnold, 1781
- The Bartered Bride, Smetana, 1866
- Beatrix Cenci, Ginastera, 1971
- Béatrice et Bénédict, Berlioz, 1862
- The Beggar's Opera, Gay, 1728
- Belisario, Donizetti, 1836
- La belle au bois dormant, Carafa, 1825
- La belle au bois dormant, Lecocq, 1900
- La belle Hélène, Offenbach, 1864
- Il Bellerofonte, Mysliveček, 1767
- Benvenuto Cellini, Berlioz, 1838
- Bertha, Rorem, 1973
- Betrothal in a Monastery, Prokofiev, 1946
- Billy Budd, Britten, 1951
- Bitter Sweet, Coward, 1929
- Blue, Tesori, 2019
- Blue Monday/135th Street, Gershwin, 1929
- Bluebeard's Castle, Bartók, 1918
- La bohème, Puccini, 1896
- La bohème, Leoncavallo, 1897
- Bomarzo, Ginastera, 1967
- Les Boréades, Rameau, 1770
- Boris Godunov, Mussorgsky, 1874
- The Brandenburgers in Bohemia, Smetana, 1866
- The Bravest Hussar, Jacobi, 1905
- Brundibár, Krása, 1943

=== C ===
- Ça Ira, Waters, 2005
- Candide, Bernstein, 1956
- La canterina, Haydn, 1766
- Capriccio, Richard Strauss, 1942
- The Captain's Daughter, Cui, 1911
- Cardillac, Paul Hindemith, 1926
- Carmen, Bizet, 1875
- Casanova's Homecoming, Argento, 1985
- Cavalleria rusticana, Mascagni, 1890
- The Cave, Reich, 1994
- Cendrillon, Massenet, 1899
- La Cenerentola, Rossini, 1817
- La Cenicienta, Hen, 1966
- Champion, Terence Blanchard, 2013
- Charles VI, Halévy, 1843
- Charlotte Corday, Lorenzo Ferrero, 1989
- Chopin, Giacomo Orefice, 1901
- Le Cid, Massenet, 1885
- Clementina, Boccherini, 1787
- La clemenza di Tito, Mozart, 1791
- Cold Mountain, Jennifer Higdon, 2015
- Comedy on the Bridge, Martinů, 1937
- Le comte Ory, Rossini, 1828
- La Conquista, Ferrero, 2005
- Les contes d'Hoffmann, Offenbach, 1881
- Der Corregidor, Wolf, 1896
- Così fan tutte, Mozart, 1790
- Confessions of a Justified Sinner, Thomas Wilson, 1976 Scottish Opera
- The Countess, Moniuszko, 1860
- The Crucible, Ward, 1961
- Die Csárdásfürstin, Kálmán, 1915
- The Cunning Little Vixen, Janáček, 1924
- La Curandera, Robert Xavier Rodriguez, 2006
- Curlew River, Britten, 1964
- Cyrano de Bergerac, Alfano, 1936

=== D ===
- Dafne, Peri, 1597
- Dalibor, Smetana, 1868
- La damnation de Faust, Berlioz, 1893
- The Dangerous Liaisons, Susa, 1994
- Dantons Tod, Einem, 1947
- Daphne, Strauss, 1938
- Dardanus, Rameau, 1739
- Dardanus, Sacchini, 1784
- Dead Man Walking, Heggie, 2000
- Death in Venice, Britten, 1973
- The Death of Klinghoffer, Adams, 1991
- The Desert Song, Romberg, 1926
- Destiny, Leoš Janáček, 1934
- The Devil and Kate, Dvořák, 1899
- The Devil Take Her, Benjamin, 1931
- Dialogues des Carmélites, Poulenc, 1957
- Dido and Aeneas, Purcell, 1689
- Dienstag aus Licht, Stockhausen, 1993
- Djamileh, Bizet, 1872
- Doctor Atomic, John Adams, 2005
- Dolores Claiborne, Picker, 2013
- Don Carlos, Verdi, 1867
- Don Giovanni, Mozart, 1787
- Don Pasquale, Donizetti, 1843
- Don Rodrigo, Ginastera, 1964
- Don Sanche, ou le Château d'Amour, Liszt, 1825
- La donna del lago, Rossini, 1819
- Le donne curiose, Wolf-Ferrari, 1903
- Donnerstag aus Licht, Stockhausen, 1981
- Dr. Sun Yat-sen, Huang Ruo, 2014
- I due Foscari, Verdi, 1844

=== E ===
- Edgar, Puccini, 1899
- The Eighth Wonder, John, 1995
- Einstein on the Beach, Glass, 1976
- Elektra, R. Strauss, 1909
- L'elisir d'amore, Donizetti, 1832
- Emmeline, Picker, 1996
- L'enfant et les sortilèges, Ravel, 1925
- The English Cat, Henze, 1983
- Die Entführung aus dem Serail, Mozart, 1782
- Ernani, Verdi, 1844
- Ero s onoga svijeta, Gotovac, 1935
- Ercole amante, Bembo, 1707
- Esclarmonde, Massenet, 1888
- L'étoile, Chabrier, 1877
- Eugene Onegin, Tchaikovsky, 1879
- Eurydice (Aucoin), Matthew Aucoin, 2020
- Euridice, Peri, 1600
- Euryanthe, Weber, 1823
- Evangeline, Luening, 1986
- Everest, Talbot, 2015
- The Excursions of Mr. Broucek, Janáček, 1920

=== F ===
- Facing Goya, Nyman, 2000
- The Fair at Sorochyntsi, Mussorgsky, 1913
- Falstaff, Verdi, 1893
- La fanciulla del West, Puccini, 1910
- Fantastic Mr. Fox, Picker, 1998
- Die Faschingsfee, Kálmán, 1917
- Faust, Gounod, 1859
- La favorite, Donizetti, 1840
- A Feast in Time of Plague, Cui, 1901
- A Feast in the Time of Plague, Alex Woolf, 2020
- Fedora, Giordano, 1898
- Die Feen, Wagner, 1833
- Feuersnot, Richard Strauss, 1901
- Fidelio, Beethoven, 1805
- The Fiery Angel, Prokofiev, 1955
- La figlia del mago, Ferrero, 1981
- La fille du régiment, Donizetti, 1840
- The Finnish Prisoner, Orlando Gough, 2007
- Fire Shut Up in My Bones, Terence Blanchard, 2019
- Die Fledermaus, J. Strauss, 1874
- Le Flibustier, Cui, 1894
- Der fliegende Holländer, Wagner, 1843
- Florencia en el Amazonas, Catán, 1996
- La forza del destino, Verdi, 1862
- Four Saints in Three Acts, Thomson, 1934
- Francesca da Rimini, Zandonai, 1914
- Francesca da Rimini, Rachmaninoff, 1906
- Der Freischütz, Weber, 1821
- Freitag aus Licht, Stockhausen, 1996
- From the House of the Dead, Janáček, 1930

=== G ===
- Galileo Galilei, Glass, 2002
- The Gambler Prokofiev, 1929
- The Garden of Mystery, Cadman, 1925
- La gazza ladra Rossini, 1817
- Geneviève de Brabant, Offenbach, 1859
- Genoveva Schumann, 1850
- Das Gesicht im Spiegel, Widmann, 2003
- The Ghosts of Versailles, Corigliano, 1991
- Gianni Schicchi, Puccini, 1918
- Gilgamesh, Brucci, 1986
- La Gioconda, Ponchielli, 1876
- Un giorno di regno, Verdi, 1840
- Giovanna d'Arco, Verdi, 1845
- Giulio Cesare, Handel, 1724
- Gloriana, Britten, 1953
- The Golden Cockerel, Rimsky-Korsakov, 1907
- The Gondoliers, Gilbert and Sullivan, 1889
- Götterdämmerung, Wagner, 1876
- Goyescas, Granados, 1916
- The Grand Duke, Gilbert and Sullivan, 1896
- Le Grand Macabre, Ligeti, 1978
- The Greater Good, or the Passion of Boule de Suif, Hartke, 2006
- The Great Friendship, Muradeli, 1947
- The Greek Passion, Martinů, 1961
- Grounded, Tesori, 2023
- Il Guarany, Carlos Gomes, 1870
- A Guest of Honor, Joplin, 1903
- Guillaume Tell, Rossini, 1829

=== H ===
- Hagith, Karol Szymanowski, 1922
- Halka, Moniuszko, 1854
- The Handmaid's Tale, Poul Ruders, 2000
- Hänsel und Gretel, Humperdinck, 1893
- Háry János, Kodály, 1926
- The Haughty Princess, Jacobi, 1904
- The Haunted Manor, Moniuszko, 1865
- Die heilige Ente, Gál, 1923
- Helvellyn, Macfarren, 1864
- Die Herzogin von Chicago, Kálmán, 1928
- L'heure espagnole, Ravel, 1911
- HMS Pinafore, Gilbert and Sullivan, 1878
- Die Hochzeit, Wagner, not performed
- The Hours (opera), Kevin Puts, 2022
- Hugh the Drover, Vaughan Williams, 1924
- Les Huguenots, Meyerbeer, 1836
- Hippolyte et Aricie, Rameau, 1733

=== I ===
- The Ice Break, Tippett, 1977
- Idomeneo, Mozart, 1781
- L'incoronazione di Poppea, Monteverdi, 1642
- Les Indes galantes, Rameau, 1735
- Iolanta, Tchaikovsky, 1892
- Iolanthe, Gilbert and Sullivan, 1882
- Iphigénie en Tauride, Gluck, 1779
- Iris, Mascagni, 1899
- The Island of Tulipatan, Offenbach, 1868
- L'italiana in Algeri, Rossini, 1813
- Ivan the Fool, Cui (first performance undetermined)

=== J ===
- The Jacobin, Dvořák, 1889
- Jenůfa, Janáček, 1904
- Jérusalem, Giuseppe Verdi, 1847
- The Jewels of the Madonna, Wolf-Ferrari, 1911
- Judith, Serov, 1863
- Juha, Aarre Merikanto, 1922/63
- La Juive, Halévy, 1835
- Julie, Boesmans, 2005
- The Jumping Frog of Calaveras County, Foss, 1950

=== K ===
- Der Kaiser von Atlantis, Ullmann, 1975
- Kaiserin Josephine, Kálmán, 1936
- Die Kalewainen in Pochjola, K. Müller-Berghaus, 1890/2017
- Káťa Kabanová, Janáček, 1921
- The Khovansky Affair, Modest Mussorgsky, 1886
- King Roger, Karol Szymanowski, 1926
- King Priam, Michael Tippett, 1962
- Koanga, Frederick Delius, 1935
- Die Königin von Saba, Karl Goldmark, 1875
- The Knot Garden, Michael Tippett, 1970
- Krútňava, Eugen Suchoň, 1949

=== L ===
- Lady Macbeth of the Mtsensk District, Shostakovich, 1934
- Lakmé, Delibes, 1883
- Das Land des Lächelns, Lehár, 1929
- The Legend of the Invisible City of Kitezh, Rimsky-Korsakov, 1912
- Leo, the Royal Cadet, Oscar Ferdinand Telgmann, George Frederick Cameron, 1889
- The Letter, Paul Moravec, 2009
- La liberazione di Ruggiero, Caccini, 1625
- Das Liebesverbot, Wagner, 1836
- Life is a Dream, Lewis Spratlan, 2010
- The Little Prince, Portman, 2003
- Little Red Riding Hood, Cui, (1921?)
- Little Women (opera), Mark Adamo, 1999
- Lohengrin, Wagner, 1850
- I Lombardi alla prima crociata, Verdi, 1843
- Lord Byron, Thomson, 1972
- Die Loreley, Bruch, 1863
- Loreley, Catalani, 1890
- Louise, Charpentier, 1900
- Louis Riel, Somers, 1967
- The Love for Three Oranges, Prokofiev, 1921
- Le loup-garou, Bertin, 1827
- Lucia di Lammermoor, Donizetti, 1835
- Lucio Silla, Mozart, 1772
- Lucrezia Borgia, Donizetti, 1834
- Luisa Miller, Verdi, 1849
- Lulu, Berg, 1937
- Die lustige Witwe, Lehár, 1905
- Die lustigen Weiber von Windsor, Nicolai, 1849

=== M ===
- Macbeth, Verdi, 1844
- Madama Butterfly, Puccini, 1904
- Mademoiselle Fifi, Cui, 1903
- The Maid of Orleans, Tchaikovsky, 1881
- The Makropulos Affair, Janáček, 1926
- Les mamelles de Tirésias Poulenc, 1947
- The Man and Men, Joshua Goodman, 2010
- The Man Who Mistook His Wife for a Hat, Nyman, 1986
- The Mandarin's Son Cui, 1878
- Manon, Massenet, 1884
- Manon Lescaut, Puccini, 1893
- Maometto II, Gioachino Rossini, 1820
- Mare nostro, Lorenzo Ferrero, 1985
- Margaret Garner, Danielpour, 2005
- María de Buenos Aires, Piazzolla, 1968
- Maria Golovin, Menotti, 1958
- Maria Stuarda Donizetti, 1835
- Marilyn, Ferrero, 1980
- The Marriage Market, Jacobi, 1911
- Martha, Flotow, 1847
- Les martyrs, Donizetti, 1840
- The Mask of Orpheus, Birtwistle, 1968
- I masnadieri, Verdi, 1847
- Masquerade, Nielsen, 1906
- Mateo Falcone, Cui, 1907
- Mathis der Maler, Hindemith, 1938
- Il matrimonio segreto, Cimarosa, 1792
- Mavra, Stravinsky, 1922
- May Night, Rimsky-Korsakov, 1880
- Mazepa (or Mazeppa), Tchaikovsky, 1884
- Médée, Cherubini, 1797
- Médée, Charpentier, 1693
- The Medium, Menotti, 1946
- Mefistofele, Boito, 1868
- Die Meistersinger von Nürnberg, Wagner, 1868
- The Merchant Kalashnikov, Anton Rubinstein, 1880
- La Merope, Giacomelli, 1734
- The Midsummer Marriage, Michael Tippett, 1955
- A Midsummer Night's Dream, Britten, 1960
- Mignon, Thomas, 1866
- The Mikado, Gilbert and Sullivan, 1885
- The Mines of Sulphur, Bennett, 1963
- The Miserly Knight, Rachmaninoff, 1906
- Miss Julie, Rorem, 1965
- Mittwoch aus Licht, Stockhausen, 2012
- Mlada, Cui, Borodin, Mussorgsky, and Rimsky-Korsakov, (collaborative work of 1872, never staged)
- Mlada, Rimsky-Korsakov, 1890
- Montag aus Licht, Stockhausen, 1988
- Moses und Aron, Schoenberg, 1957
- The Most Important Man, Menotti, 1957
- Motezuma, Vivaldi, 1733
- Mozart and Salieri, Rimsky-Korsakov, 1898

=== N ===
- Nabucco, Verdi, 1842
- Eine Nacht in Venedig, J. Strauss, 1883
- Nędza uszczęśliwiona, Maciej Kamieński, 1778
- The New Moon, Romberg, 1928
- Nicholas and Alexandra, Drattell, 2003
- The Nightingale, Stravinsky, 1914
- Nina, Paisiello, 1789
- El Niño, John Adams, 2000
- Nixon in China, Adams, 1987
- Norma, Bellini, 1831
- The Nose, Shostakovich, 1930
- Le nozze di Figaro, Mozart, 1786

=== O ===
- Oberto, conte di San Bonifacio, Verdi, 1839
- L'oca del Cairo, Mozart, 1783
- An Occurrence at Owl Creek Bridge, Musgrave, 1981
- Oédipe, George Enescu, 1936
- Oedipus Rex, Igor Stravinsky, 1927
- The Old Maid and the Thief, Menotti, 1939
- Operation Orfeo, Bo Holten, 1993
- Das Opfer, Winfried Zillig, 1937
- L'Oracolo, Franco Leoni, 1905
- Oresteia, Taneyev, 1895
- L'Orfeo, Monteverdi, 1607
- Orfeo ed Euridice, Gluck, 1762
- Orlando furioso, Vivaldi, 1727
- Orphée aux enfers, Offenbach, 1858
- Orphée et Eurydice, Gluck, 1774
- Oscar, Theodore Morrison, 2013
- Otello, Verdi, 1887
- Otello, Rossini, 1816
- Owen Wingrave, Britten, 1971

=== P ===
- Pagliacci, Leoncavallo, 1892
- Paradise Lost, Penderecki, 1978
- Parsifal, Wagner, 1882
- Patience, Gilbert and Sullivan, 1881
- Le Pays, Ropartz, 1912
- Les pêcheurs de perles, Bizet, 1863
- Pelléas et Mélisande, Debussy, 1902
- Peter Grimes, Britten, 1945
- Le piccole storie, Ferrero, 2007
- The Pirates of Penzance, Gilbert and Sullivan, 1879
- Polyphème, Cras, 1945
- Porgy and Bess, Gershwin, 1935
- Porin, Lisinski, 1851
- Powder Her Face, Thomas Adès, 1995
- The Power of the Fiend, Serov, 1871
- Prince Igor, Borodin, 1890
- Princess Ida, Gilbert and Sullivan, 1884
- La Principessa Liana, Schipa, 1929
- Prisoner of the Caucasus, Cui, 1883
- I puritani, Bellini, 1835
- Puss in Boots, Cui, 1915

=== Q ===
- I quattro rusteghi, Wolf-Ferrari, 1906
- The Queen of Spades, Tchaikovsky, 1890
- A Quiet Place, Bernstein, 1983

=== R ===
- Radamisto, Handel, 1720
- The Rake's Progress, Stravinsky, 1951
- The Rape of Lucretia, Britten, 1946
- Rappacini's Daughter, Garwood, 1980
- Il rè pastore, Mozart, 1775
- El retablo de Maese Pedro, de Falla, 1923
- Das Rheingold, Wagner, 1869
- Rienzi, Wagner, 1842
- Rigoletto, Verdi, 1851
- Rinaldo, Handel, 1711
- Der Ring des Nibelungen, Wagner, 1876
- Río de Sangre, Don Davis, 2010
- Risorgimento!, Lorenzo Ferrero, 2011
- Il ritorno d'Ulisse in patria, Monteverdi, 1640
- Roberto Devereux, Donizetti, 1837
- Rodelinda, Handel, 1725
- Rogneda, Serov, 1865
- Le Roi Arthus, Ernest Chausson, 1903
- Le roi de Lahore, Massenet, 1877
- Roméo et Juliette, Gounod, 1867
- La rondine, Puccini, 1917
- Der Rosenkavalier, R. Strauss, 1911
- The Rose of Castille, Michael Balfe, 1857
- Ruddigore, Gilbert and Sullivan, 1887
- Rusalka, Dargomyzhsky, 1856
- Rusalka, Dvořák, 1901
- Ruslan and Lyudmila, Glinka, 1842

=== S ===
- Sadko, Rimsky-Korsakov, 1898
- Saint-François d'Assise, Messiaen, 1983
- The Saint of Bleecker Street, Menotti, 1954
- Salammbô, Reyer, 1890
- Salome, R. Strauss, 1905
- Salvatore Giuliano, Lorenzo Ferrero, 1986
- Samson, Handel, 1743
- Samstag aus Licht, Stockhausen, 1984
- Samson et Dalila, Saint-Saëns, 1877
- Il Sant'Alessio, Landi, 1632
- The Saracen, Cui, 1899
- Šárka, Janáček, 1925
- Satyagraha, Glass, 1980
- The Scarecrow, Turrin, 2006
- The Scarlet Letter, Laitman, 2008, rev. 2016
- Der Schauspieldirektor, Mozart, 1786
- Der Schmied von Gent, Schreker, 1932
- Die Schuldigkeit des ersten Gebots, Mozart, 1767
- Schwanda the Bagpiper, Weinberger, 1927
- La secchia rapita, Salieri, 1772
- Semele, Eccles, written 1707
- Semele, Handel, 1744
- Semiramide, Rossini, 1823
- Serse, Handel, 1738
- Shell Shock, Nicholas Lens, 2014
- Le siège de Corinthe, Rossini, 1826
- Siren Song, Jonathan Dove, 1994
- Shining Brow, Hagen, 1992
- The Sho-Gun, Ade and Luders, 1904
- Siegfried, Wagner, 1876
- Simon Boccanegra, Verdi, 1857
- Simplicius, J. Strauss, 1887
- The Skating Rink, Sawer, 2018
- Slow Man, Nicholas Lens, 2012
- The Snow Bogatyr, Cui, 1906
- The Snow Maiden, Rimsky-Korsakov, 1882
- Il sogno di Scipione, Mozart, 1772
- La sonnambula, Bellini, 1831
- Sonntag aus Licht, Stockhausen, 2011
- The Sorcerer, Gilbert and Sullivan, 1877
- Sorochintsy Fair — see The Fair at Sorochyntsi
- Lo sposo deluso, Mozart, 1783
- Stiffelio, Giuseppe Verdi, 1850
- The Stone Guest, Dargomyzhsky, 1872
- Street Scene, Weill, 1947
- The Summer King, Daniel Sonenberg, 2017
- Suor Angelica, Puccini, 1918
- Susannah, Floyd, 1955
- Svätopluk, Suchoň, 1960
- Szibill, Jacobi, 1914

=== T ===
- Il tabarro, Puccini, 1918
- The Tale of Tsar Saltan, Rimsky-Korsakov, 1900
- Tancredi, Rossini, 1813
- Tannhäuser und der Sängerkrieg auf Wartburg, Wagner, 1845
- Tartuffe, Mechem, 1980
- Tea: A Mirror of Soul, Tan Dun, 2007
- De temporum fine comoedia, Orff, 1973
- The Tempest, Thomas Adès, 2004
- The Tender Land, Copland, 1954
- Thérèse Raquin, Picker, 2001
- The Three Feathers, Laitman, 2014
- Thaïs (opera), Massenet, 1894
- The Threepenny Opera, Weill, 1928
- Three Tales, Reich, 2002
- Tiefland, Eugen d'Albert, 1911
- Tosca, Puccini, 1900
- Die tote Stadt, Korngold, 1920
- La traviata, Verdi, 1853
- Treemonisha, Joplin, 1911
- Trial by Jury, Gilbert and Sullivan, 1875
- Triple-Sec, Blitzstein, 1929
- Tristan und Isolde, Wagner, 1865
- Trouble in Tahiti, Bernstein, 1952
- Il trovatore, Verdi, 1853
- Troy, Bujor Hoinic, 2018
- Les Troyens, Berlioz, 1863
- The Tsar's Bride, Rimsky-Korsakov, 1899
- Turandot, Puccini, 1926
- Il turco in Italia, Rossini, 1814
- The Turn of the Screw, Britten, 1954

=== U ===
- ’u’, Eef van Breen, 2010
- El último sueño de Frida y Diego, Gabriela Lena Frank, 2022
- Utopia Limited, Gilbert and Sullivan, 1893

=== V ===
- Vanessa, Barber, 1958
- Veinticinco de agosto, 1983, Solare, 1992
- Verbum nobile, Moniuszko, 1861
- La vestale, Spontini, 1807
- Il viaggio a Reims, Rossini, 1825
- La vida breve, de Falla, 1913
- Le Villi, Puccini, 1884
- Violanta, Korngold, 1916
- Violet, Roger Scruton, 2005
- Volo di notte, Dallapiccola, 1940
- Les vêpres siciliennes, Verdi, 1855
- Venus and Adonis, Blow, c.1683
- Vera of Las Vegas, Hagen, 1996

=== W ===
- Die Walküre, Wagner, 1870
- La Wally, Catalani, 1892
- War and Peace, Prokofiev, 1946
- A Wedding, Bolcom, 2004
- Weiße Rose by Udo Zimmermann; 1st version 1967; 2nd version 1986
- Werther, Massenet, 1892
- What Men Live By, Martinů, 1953
- Written on Skin, George Benjamin, 2012
- William Ratcliff, Cui, 1869
- Wozzeck, Berg, 1925
- Wuthering Heights, Floyd, 1958
- Wuthering Heights, Herrmann, 1982

=== X ===
- X, The Life and Times of Malcolm X, Davis, 1986

=== Y ===
- The Yeomen of the Guard, Gilbert and Sullivan, 1888
- Yerma, Villa-Lobos, 1971

=== Z ===
- Zaide, Mozart, 1866 (written 1780)
- Die Zauberflöte, Mozart, 1791

== See also ==
- List of important operas
- List of operas by composer
