= 1866 in music =

| List of years in music | (table) |
- … 1856; 1857; 1858; 1859; 1860; 1861; 1862; 1863; 1864; 1865; 1866; 1867; 1868; 1869; 1870; 1871; 1872; 1873; 1874; 1875; 1876 …
- Art; Archaeology; Architecture; Literature; Music; Philosophy; Science; +...

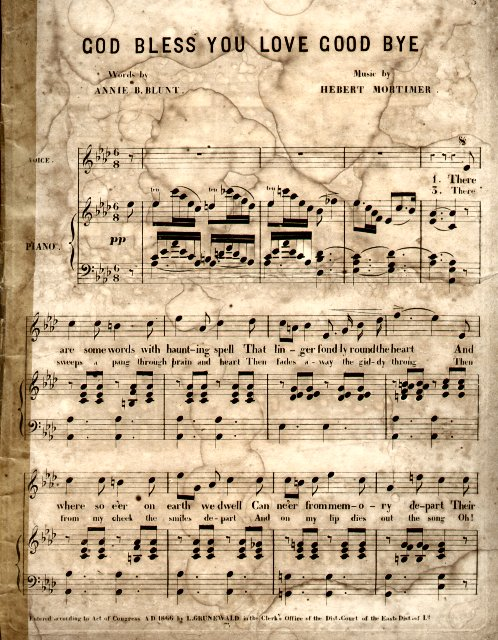

== Events ==
- January – Gabriel Fauré becomes organist at the Church of Saint-Sauveur, at Rennes in Brittany.
- March–December – Pyotr Ilyich Tchaikovsky writes his Symphony No. 1, Winter Daydreams.
- May 30 – Bedřich Smetana's opera The Bartered Bride (Prodana Nevesta) debuts at the Provisional Theatre (Prague).
- August – Sir William Sterndale Bennett becomes Principal of the Royal Academy of Music in London.
- August 4 – First performance of Gabriel Fauré's Cantique de Jean Racine.
- August 9 – Marie Trautmann marries fellow musician Alfred Jaëll.
- October 21 – Jacques Offenbach's operetta La Vie parisienne debuts in Paris at the Théâtre du Palais Royale.
- November 17 – Ambroise Thomas's opera Mignon debuts in Paris at the Opéra-Comique.
- Theodore Thomas conducts the New York Philharmonic in the American premiere of the Prelude to Act 1 of Wagner's Tristan und Isolde.
- Mily Balakirev publishes his Collection of Russian Folksongs, including "The Song of the Volga Boatmen".
- Georges Bizet completes the opera La jolie fille de Perth; it is premiered the following year.
- Brahms completes all but the fifth movement of the A German Requiem

== Published popular music ==
- "Beautiful River"
- "Come Back To Erin" w.m. Claribel
- "Father's a Drunkard and Mother Is Dead" w. Stella m. Mrs. E. A. Parkhurst
- "We Parted By The River" w.m. William Shakespeare Hays
- "When You and I Were Young, Maggie" by James A. Butterfield & George Washington Johnson
- "Write Me A Letter Home" w.m. Will S. Hays
- "You Naughty, Naughty Men" (in The Black Crook) w. T. Kennick m. G. Bickwell

== Classical music ==
- Felix Draeseke – Fantasie on Themes from Boieldieus "Weisse Dame"
- Johann Gottfried Piefke – Königgrätzer Marsch
- Amilcare Ponchielli – Concerto for Trumpet in F major
- Arthur Sullivan – Irish Symphony
- Franz von Suppé - Light Cavalry Overture
- Pyotr Ilyich Tchaikovsky - Symphony No. 1 "Winter Dreams"

== Opera ==
- Karel Miry
  - Maria van Boergondië (opera in 4 acts, libretto by N. Destanberg, premiered on August 28 in Ghent)
  - De Keizer bij de Boeren (opera in 1 act, libretto by N. Destanberg, premiered on October 29 in Ghent)
  - De occasie maakt den dief (opera in 1 act, libretto by N. Destanberg, premiered on December 24 in Ghent)
- Bedřich Smetana- The Bartered Bride
- Franz von Suppé – Leichte Kavallerie

== Musical theater ==
- La Belle Hélène (Lyrics: Henri Meilhac & Ludovic Halévy Music: Jacques Offenbach) London production opened at the Adelphi Theatre on June 30
- The Black Crook – the first "book musical". Broadway production opened at Niblo's Garden on September 12 and ran for 474 performances

== Births ==
- January 13 – Vasily Kalinnikov, composer (d. 1901)
- March 10 – Amanda Aldridge, opera singer, teacher and composer (d. 1956)
- April 1 – Ferruccio Busoni, pianist, composer (d. 1924)
- April 13 – Carl Valentin Wunderle, violinist (d. 1944)
- May 17 – Erik Satie, composer (d. 1925)
- June 15 – Charles Wood, composer (d. 1926)
- June 29 – George Frederick Boyle, composer (d. 1948)
- July 13 – La Goulue, can-can dancer (d. 1929)
- July 23 – Francesco Cilea, composer (d. 1950)
- September 26 – George H. Clutsam, pianist, composer and writer (d. 1951)
- November 7 – Paul Lincke, composer (d. 1946)
- date unknown
  - Annibale Fagnola, violin maker (d. 1939)
  - Dorothea Ruggles-Brise, née Stewart-Murray, collector of traditional Scottish music (d. 1937)

== Deaths ==
- January 25 – Minna Wagner, estranged wife of Richard Wagner, 56 (heart attack)
- February 6 – Anna Liszt, pianist and mother of Franz Liszt, 77
- March 20 – Rikard Nordraak, composer, 21 (tuberculosis)
- July 25 – Aloys Schmitt, composer, pianist and music teacher, 77
- October 2 – Adam Darr, guitarist, singer and composer, 55 (suicide by drowning)
- November 26 – Adrien-Francois Servais, cellist, 59
- November 29 – Sophie Löwe, operatic soprano, 51
- December 1 – Jules Demersseman, flautist and composer, 33 (tuberculosis)
- December 3 – Jan Kalivoda, violinist, conductor and composer, 65
