= 1868 in music =

List of years in music	(table)
- … 1858; 1859; 1860; 1861; 1862; 1863; 1864; 1865; 1866; 1867; 1868; 1869; 1870; 1871; 1872; 1873; 1874; 1875; 1876; 1877; 1878 …
- Art; Archaeology; Architecture; Literature; Music; Philosophy; Science; +...

== Events ==
- January 5 – Max Bruch's Violin Concerto no. 1 in G minor is first performed in its revised version by Joseph Joachim in Bremen with Karl Martin Rheinthaler conducting.
- February 3 – Pyotr Ilyich Tchaikovsky's Symphony No. 1 ("Winter Daydreams") is first performed in Moscow at a Russian Musical Society concert (having been premièred in Saint Petersburg).
- April 10 (Good Friday) – The six movement version of Brahms' A German Requiem (Ein deutsches Requiem) is premièred in Bremen Cathedral with Brahms conducting and Julius Stockhausen as the baritone soloist.
- June 21 – Richard Wagner's opera Die Meistersinger von Nürnberg debuts at the Königliches Hof- und National-Theater, Munich with Hans von Bülow conducting.
- August 15 – Teatro Giuseppe Verdi opens in Busseto, Italy.
- October – Modest Mussorgsky begins work on his opera Boris Godunov, which is completed six years later.
- December 21 – The newly rebuilt Gaiety Theatre, London (in the West End) reopens with operatic parodies, including the burlesque Robert the Devil, or The Nun, the Dun, and the Son of a Gun, setting new lyrics by W. S. Gilbert to popular continental opera tunes.
- Aristide Cavaillé-Coll's organ at Notre-Dame de Paris is dedicated.
- Edvard Grieg writes his Piano Concerto while staying on Zealand.

== Published popular music ==
- "Captain Jinks"
- "Come Back To Erin" by Claribel
- "Crown Him with Many Crowns" w. Matthew Bridges (1851) m. George Job Elvey (1868)
- "Her Bright Smile Haunts Me Still" w. J.E. Carpenter m. W.T. Wrighton
- "I Cannot Sing The Old Songs" w.m. Claribel
- "Little Footsteps" w. Michael Bennett Leavitt m. James A. Barney
- "The Man on the Flying Trapeze" by George Leybourne, Gaston Lyle, & Alfred Lee (first published the previous year)
- "The Sweet By and By" w. S. Fillmore m. Joseph P. Webster
- "Walking In The Zoo" w. Hugh Willoughby Sweny m. Alfred Lee
- "What a Friend We Have in Jesus" w. Joseph M. Scriven (1855) m. Charles C. Converse (1868)
- "The Whispering Hope" by Septimus Winner
- "The Widow In The Cottage By The Sea" w.m. Charles A. White
- "Yield Not To Temptation" w.m. Horatio R. Palmer

== Classical music ==
- Jean-Baptiste Accolay – Concerto for Violin No. 1 in A minor
- Georges Bizet – Variations chromatiques de concert for piano
- Ignaz Brüll – Piano Concerto No. 2 in C, op. 24
- Johannes Brahms
  - Ein deutsches Requiem, op. 45
  - 5 Lieder, op. 49
- Anton Bruckner - Symphony No. 1
- Camille Saint-Saëns – Piano Concerto No. 2
- Johann Strauss II – Tales from the Vienna Woods
- Peter Tchaikovsky
  - Songs Without Words
  - Fatum

== Opera ==
"Morgenlich leuchtend im rosigen Schein"
1910 Edison Records recording of Walther's Prize Song from Richard Wagner's Die Meistersinger von Nürnberg by Leo Slezak.

- Arrigo Boito – Mefistofele
- Gaetano Braga – Ruy Blas
- John Thomas Douglass – Virginia's Ball performed (once) at the Stuyvesant Institute on Broadway in New York City, generally regarded as the first opera written by a black composer
- Gialdino Gialdini – Rosmunda premiered March 5 at the Teatro Pergola, Florence
- Jacques Offenbach – The Island of Tulipatan
- Richard Wagner – Die Meistersinger von Nürnberg, premièred in the Königliches Hof- und National-Theater, Munich

== Musical theatre ==
- La Belle Hélène (Music by Jacques Offenbach Libretto by Henri Meilhac and Ludovic Halévy) New York production opened at Pike's Opera House on November 2 and ran for 14 performances
- Ixion Broadway production opened at Wood's Museum and Metropolitan on September 28 and ran for 120 performances. Starring Lydia Thompson.
- The White Fawn Broadway production opened at Niblo's Garden on January 17 and ran for 176 performances

== Births ==
- January 6 – Vittorio Monti, Italian violinist, composer and conductor (d. 1922)
- January 24 – Frank Peabody Atherton, composer, educator (d. 1911)
- January 26 – Juventino Rosas, composer, band leader (d. 1894)
- April 13 – John Blackwood McEwen, composer, educator (d. 1948)
- April 19 – Max von Schillings, composer, conductor (d. 1933)
- April 22 – José Vianna da Motta, composer, pianist (d. 1948)
- July 19 – Florence Foster Jenkins, soprano (d. 1944)
- August 7 – Granville Bantock, composer (d. 1946)
- August 21 – Vess Ossman, ragtime banjo player (d. 1923)
- September 8 – Seth Weeks, African American jazz mandolinist, composer, arranger and bandleader (d. 1953)
- September 12 – Jan Brandts Buys, composer (d. 1933)
- November 30 – Ernest Newman, critic (d. 1959)
- Early? (or November 24?) – Scott Joplin, African American ragtime composer, pianist (d. 1917)

== Deaths ==
- January 3 – Moritz Hauptmann, composer (b. 1792)
- February 25 – Sophie Schröder, actress and singer (b. 1781)
- March 2 – Carl Eberwein, composer (b. 1786)
- April 3 – Franz Berwald, composer (b. 1796)
- April 26 – Karel Strakatý, singer (b. 1804)
- June 5 – Anselm Hüttenbrenner, composer (b. 1794)
- July 6 – Samuel Lover, songwriter (b. 1797)
- August 11 – Halfdan Kjerulf, composer (b. 1815)
- November 13 – Gioacchino Rossini, composer (b. 1792)
- November 25 – Franz Brendel, music critic (b. 1811)
- December 23 – Karl Ferdinand Adam, composer and cantor (b. 1806)
- date unknown
  - Berl Broder, singer and troubadour (b. 1815)
  - Erik Jonsson Helland, Hardanger fiddle maker (b. 1816)
