= 1874 in music =

List of years in music	(table)
- … 1864; 1865; 1866; 1867; 1868; 1869; 1870; 1871; 1872; 1873; 1874; 1875; 1876; 1877; 1878; 1879; 1880; 1881; 1882; 1883; 1884 …
- Art; Archaeology; Architecture; Literature; Music; Philosophy; Science; +...

This article is about music-related events in 1874.

== Events ==
- January 27 – Modest Mussorgsky's opera Boris Godunov premiers in Mariinsky Theatre in St.Petersburg
- February–March – A memorial exhibition of drawings and watercolors by Viktor Hartmann is held at the Imperial Academy of Arts in Saint Petersburg and inspires his friend Modest Mussorgsky to compose the piano suite Pictures at an Exhibition.
- October – Bedřich Smetana completely loses his hearing, after being deaf in one ear for some time.
- Richard Wagner moves into Wahnfried, the villa built for him at Bayreuth and completes Götterdämmerung.
- Franz Xaver Haberl founds a school for church musicians at Regensburg.

== Published popular music ==
- "Christ Arose" w. m. Robert Lowry
- "Crimson Roses In the Heather" by Caroline Dana Howe & William Howard Doane
- "Laughing Eyes Of Blue" w. J. Cheever Goodwin, m. Edward E. Rice. Performed by Eliza Weathersby in the Victorian burlesque musical Evangeline
- "Oh! Dat Watermelon!" by Luke Schoolcraft
- "Ninety and Nine" w. Elizabeth Clephane (1868), m. Ira Sankey (1874)
- "We met by chance, sweet Jenny," words by Samuel N. Mitchell, music by William A. Huntley
- "Won't You Buy My Pretty Flowers?" w. Arthur W. French, m. George W. Wesley

== Classical music ==
- Max Bruch – Romance in A minor, Op. 42
- Anton Bruckner – Symphony No. 4
- Albert Dietrich – Violin Concerto
- Antonín Dvořák – String Quartet No. 7 opus 16 in A minor
- Friedrich Kiel – Christus (oratorio)
- Edouard Lalo – Symphonie Espagnole Op. 21, in D minor
- Modest Petrovich Mussorgsky – Pictures at an Exhibition (for piano)
- Camille Saint-Saëns
  - Allegro appassionato in C♯ minor for piano.
  - Danse macabre, Op. 40
- Giuseppe Verdi – Requiem

== Opera ==
- Alfred Cellier – The Sultan of Mocha (premiered at Manchester)
- Gialdino Gialdini – L'Idolo cinese (premiered at the Teatro delle Logge, in Florence)
- Karel Miry – Het arme kind (opera in 1 act, libretto by J. Story, premiered in Ghent)
- Modest Mussorgsky - Boris Godunov premiers in Mariinsky Theatre in St.Petersburg on January 27
- Emile Pessard – Don Quichotte (premiered on February 13 at the Salle Érard, in Paris)
- Johann Strauss II – Die Fledermaus

== Musical theater ==
- Evangeline, a US burlesque musical based upon a poem by Henry Wadsworth Longfellow, opened at Niblo's Gardens on July 27 and ran for only 16 performances before moving to Boston.
- Whittington, London production

== Births ==
- January 4 – Josef Suk – Czech composer and violinist (d. 1935)
- February 6 – David Evans, composer (d. 1948)
- February 20 – Mary Garden, operatic soprano d. 1967)
- March 31 – Henri Marteau, French composer and violinist (d. 1934)
- July 5 – Anna Lang, Swedish harpist
- July 26 – Serge Koussevitzky, Russian-born conductor and double-bassist (d. 1951)
- August 9
  - Reynaldo Hahn, French composer and conductor (d. 1947)
  - Lee Orean Smith, American composer, arranger, music editor, publisher, music teacher, multi-instrumentalist, and conductor (d. 1942)
- September 13 – Arnold Schoenberg, composer (d. 1951)
- September 21 – Gustav Holst, English composer (d. 1934)
- October 20 – Charles Ives, American composer (d. 1954)
- November 12 – Bert Williams, entertainer (d. 1922)
- November 15 – Alberto Zelman, conductor (d. 1927)
- December 13 – Josef Lhévinne, Russian pianist (d. 1944)
- December 21 – Adele Ritchie, American singer (d. 1930)
- December 22 – Franz Schmidt, Austrian composer (d. 1939)
- December 25 – Lina Cavalieri, glamorous opera singer (d. 1944)
- December 31 – Ernest Austin, English composer (d. 1947)

== Deaths ==
- February 13 – Johann Friedrich Franz Burgmüller, pianist and composer (b. 1806)
- March 20 – Hans Christian Lumbye, Denmark composer and conductor (b. 1810)
- May 1 – Vilém Blodek, flautist, pianist and composer (b. 1834)
- June 30 – Blanche d'Antigny, singer and actress (b. 1840) (typhoid)
- July 3 – Franz Bendel, composer (b. 1832)
- October 6 – Thomas Tellefsen, pianist and composer (b. 1823)
- October 26 – Peter Cornelius, German composer (b. 1824)
- November 24 – Friedrich Wilhelm Grund, German composer (b. 1791)
- December 19 – Josef Vorel, composer (b. 1801)
- December 22 – Johann Peter Pixis, German pianist and composer (b. 1788)
- date unknown
  - Salvatore Agnelli, composer (b. 1817)
  - Sandford C. Faulkner, fiddler and composer (b. 1806)
  - Dominique Peccatte, luthier (b. 1810)
