= 1876 in music =

List of years in music	(table)
- … 1866; 1867; 1868; 1869; 1870; 1871; 1872; 1873; 1874; 1875; 1876; 1877; 1878; 1879; 1880; 1881; 1882; 1883; 1884; 1885; 1886 …
- Art; Archaeology; Architecture; Literature; Music; Philosophy; Science; +...

This article is about music-related events in 1876.

== Events ==
- February – Baritone Lithgow James joins the English Opera Company, where he begins a partnership with his future wife Florence St. John.
- April - Tchaikovsky completes Swan Lake
- February 24 – Incidental music composed by Edvard Grieg for Henrik Ibsen's Peer Gynt premieres.
- May 17 – Antonín Dvořák begins composing his Moravian Duets.
- August 16 – Richard Wagner's Siegfried debuts in the new Bayreuth Festspielhaus.
- August 17 – Richard Wagner's Götterdämmerung debuts in the new Bayreuth Festspielhaus.
- Soprano Rosa Hasselbeck marries the conductor and composer Josef Sucher.

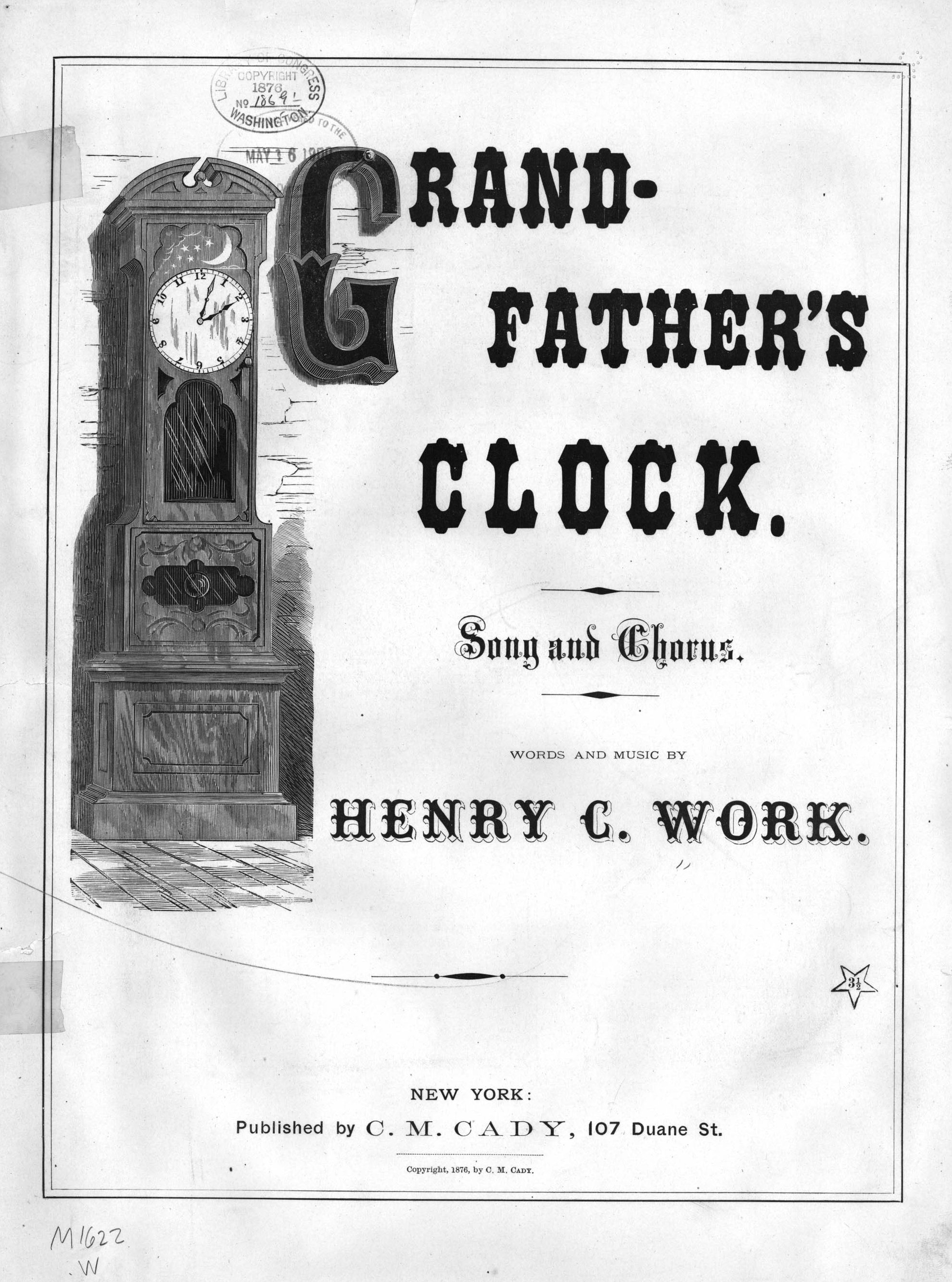

== Published popular music ==
- "Grandfather's Clock" by Henry Clay Work
- "The Bonnie Banks o' Loch Lomond" by Andrew Lang
- "Gay As A Lark" by Septimus Winner
- "When The Great Red Dawn is Shining" (anon)
- "Old Aunt Jemima" by Billy Kersands
- "Molly Malone"
- "Rose of Killarney" by George Cooper & John Rogers Thomas

== Classical music ==
- Johannes Brahms – Symphony No. 1
- Pietro Abbà Cornaglia – Requiem
- Felix Draeseke – Six Fugues for piano; Dämmerungsräume: five piano pieces, Op. 14
- Antonín Dvořák – Piano Concerto in G minor, Op. 33
- Gabriel Fauré – Violin Sonata No. 1 in A major, Op. 13
- César Franck – Les Éolides
- Benjamin Godard – Concerto Romantique
- Edvard Grieg – Ballade in the Form of Variations on a Norwegian Folk Song (for piano), Op. 24
- Édouard Lalo – Cello Concerto
- Gustav Mahler – Piano Quartet movement in A
- Bedřich Smetana – String Quartet No. 1 in E minor, From My Life
- Pyotr Ilyich Tchaikovsky – The Seasons (for piano), Op. 37a
- Charles-Marie Widor – Organ Symphonies Nos. 1–3, Op. 13

== Opera ==
- Arrigo Boito – Mefistofele
- Luigi Denza – Wallenstein
- Amilcare Ponchielli – La Gioconda
- Bedřich Smetana – The Kiss
- Richard Wagner
  - Siegfried
  - Götterdämmerung
- Ivan Zajc – Nikola Šubić Zrinski

== Musical theater ==
- Richard Genée – Der Seekadette
- Robert Planquette – Les cloches de Corneville

== Births ==
- January 12
  - Annie Krull, operatic soprano (died 1947)
  - Ermanno Wolf-Ferrari, composer (died 1948)
- January 19 – Rosina Storchio, Italian lyric soprano (died 1945)
- January 29
  - Havergal Brian, composer (died 1972)
  - Ludolf Nielsen, composer (died 1939)
- February 2 – Giovanni Zenatello, tenor (died 1949)
- February 28 – John Alden Carpenter, composer
- March 11 – Carl Ruggles, composer (died 1971)
- May 17 – Carrie Tubb, soprano (died 1976)
- May 19 – Jan Ingenhoven, Dutch composer and conductor
- June 2 – Hakon Børresen, Danish composer (died 1954)
- June 5 – Tony Jackson, jazz musician (died 1920)
- August 14 – Florrie Forde, Australian-born English music hall singer (died 1940)
- August 16 – Karl Hoschna, Bohemian-born US composer
- September 15 – Bruno Walter, conductor (died 1962)
- November 23 – Manuel de Falla, composer (died 1946)
- December 11 – Mieczysław Karłowicz, composer (died 1909)
- December 29
  - Pablo Casals, cellist (died 1973)
  - Lionel Tertis, violist (died 1975)

== Deaths ==
- February 28 – Raimondo Boucheron, composer, 75
- March 5
  - Francesco Maria Piave, librettist and friend of Giuseppe Verdi, 65
  - Marie d'Agoult, lover of Franz Liszt and mother of Cosima Wagner, 70
- March 28 – Joseph Böhm, violinist, 80
- April 19 – Samuel Sebastian Wesley, organist and composer, 65
- June 28 – August Wilhelm Ambros, composer and music historian, 69
- August 29 – Félicien-César David, composer, 66
- September 9 – Mary Shaw, operatic contralto, 62
- September 30 – Henri Bertini, pianist and composer, 77
- October 1 – James Lick, American carpenter and piano builder, 80
- November 8 – Antonio Tamburini, operatic baritone, 76
- November 9 – Édouard Batiste, organist and composer, 56
- November 18 – Nicolas Bosret, blind organist and composer, 77
- December 3 – Hermann Goetz, composer, 35 (tuberculosis)
- December 14 – George Frederick Anderson, violinist, 83
