= 1840 in music =

List of years in music	(table)
- … 1830; 1831; 1832; 1833; 1834; 1835; 1836; 1837; 1838; 1839; 1840; 1841; 1842; 1843; 1844; 1845; 1846; 1847; 1848; 1849; 1850 …
- Art; Archaeology; Architecture; Literature; Music; Philosophy; Science; +...

This article is about music-related events in 1840.

== Events ==
- February 11 – Gaetano Donizetti's opera La Fille du Regiment premieres in Paris.
- April 2 – Première of Ferdinand Hiller's oratorio, Die Zerstörung Jerusalems, at the Leipzig Gewandhaus; Robert Schumann is in the audience.
- June 9 – Franz Liszt gives the first piano recital, in London's Hanover Square Rooms.
- c. June - Felix Mendelssohn releases his score for String Quartet No. 3 in D Major.
- August 6 – First major public performance since the death of Johann Sebastian Bach of the Toccata and Fugue in D minor, BWV 565 for organ attributed to him, given by Felix Mendelssohn in Leipzig; Robert Schumann is in the audience.
- c. October – Richard Wagner is committed to debtors' prison in France while completing his opera Rienzi.
- Robert Schumann's "year of song", in which he writes the two Liederkreis, Frauenliebe und -leben and Dichterliebe. He also marries Clara Wieck.
- The first harmonium is built.
- Anton Schindler's biography of Ludwig van Beethoven is published.
- Michele Carafa becomes Professor of Counterpoint at the Paris Conservatoire.
- Édouard Batiste and François Bazin share the Prix de Rome.

== Popular music ==
- Henry Russell (music) & Eliza Cook (lyrics) – "The Old Arm Chair"
- Robert Lucas de Pearsall – "Lay a garland"

== Classical music ==
- Hector Berlioz - Grande symphonie funebre et triomphale 26 July
- Johannes Bernards van Bree - String Quartet No. 2
- Johanna Kinkel - Don Ramiro, Op. 13
- Felix Mendelssohn – Lobgesang (Symphony No. 2 in B-flat Major)
- Giacomo Meyerbeer - Nella
- Robert Schumann
  - Liederkreis, Op. 24
  - Myrthen, Op. 25
  - Lieder und Gesänge volume, Op. 27
  - 3 Gedichte, Op. 29
  - 3 Gedichte, Op. 30
  - 3 Gesänge, Op. 31
  - 6 Lieder, Op. 33
  - 4 Duets, Op. 34
  - 12 Gedichte, Op. 35
  - 6 Gedichte, Op. 36
  - Liederkreis, Op. 39
  - 5 Lieder, Op. 40
  - Frauenliebe und -leben, Op. 42
  - 3 Duets, Op. 43
  - Romanzen & Balladen volume I, Op. 45
  - Dichterliebe, Op. 48
  - Romanzen & Balladen volume II, Op. 49
  - Romanzen & Balladen volume III, Op. 53
  - Belsatzar, ballad, Op. 57
- Louis Spohr – Symphony no 6 in G major, Op. 116 "Historical"

== Opera ==
- Gaetano Donizetti – "La Favorite" and La Fille du Régiment (The Daughter of the Regiment)
- Albert Lortzing – Hans Sachs
- Temistocle Solera – Ildegonda
- Giuseppe Verdi – Un giorno di regno

== Births ==
- January 18 – Ernst Rudorff, composer and music teacher (d. 1918)
- February 2 – Louis-Albert Bourgault-Ducoudray, pianist and composer (d. 1910)
- February 12 – Philippe Decker, conductor and composer (d. 1881)
- February 22 - Samuel de Lange, composer and educator (d. 1911)
- February 24 – Auguste Götze, German classical singer and vocal pedagogue (d. 1908)
- March 8 – Franco Faccio, conductor and composer (d. 1891)
- April 12 – Franz Xaver Haberl, musicologist (d. 1910)
- May 7 – Pyotr Ilyich Tchaikovsky, composer (d. 1893)
- May 9 – Blanche d'Antigny, singer and actress (d. 1874)
- August 1 – Franz Simandl, double-bassist and teacher (d. 1912)
- August 28 – Ira D. Sankey, gospel singer and composer (d. 1908)
- September 14 – George Whiting, composer (d. 1923)
- September 30 – Johan Svendsen, violinist, conductor and composer (d. 1911)
- October 18 – Roberto Stagno, operatic tenor (d. 1897)
- December 7 – Hermann Goetz, composer (d. 1876)
- December 17 – C. F. E. Horneman, composer (d. 1906)

== Deaths ==
- March 20 – Anton Friedrich Justus Thibaut, lawyer and musician, 68
- May 1 – Giuditta Grisi, operatic mezzo-soprano, 34
- May 10 – Catterino Cavos, organist, conductor and composer, 64
- May 25 – Nikolai Lavrov, operatic baritone, 37
- May 27 – Niccolò Paganini, violinist and composer, 57
- June 5 – William Dance, pianist and violinist, 84
- June 16 – Joseph Kreutzer, violinist, conductor and composer, 49
- September 15 - Franz Pecháček, violinist and composer, 47
- November 19 – Johann Michael Vogl, baritone and composer, 72
