= 1831 in music =

| List of years in music | (table) |
- … 1821; 1822; 1823; 1824; 1825; 1826; 1827; 1828; 1829; 1830; 1831; 1832; 1833; 1834; 1835; 1836; 1837; 1838; 1839; 1840; 1841 …
- Art; Archaeology; Architecture; Literature; Music; Philosophy; Science; +...

This article is about music-related events in 1831.

== Events ==
- Frédéric Chopin arrives in Paris.
- The first opera, Deux mots by Nicolas Dalayrac in performed in Oslo directed by August Schrumpf with Augusta Smith in the main part. Emilie da Fonseca is employed at Christiania Theatre.

== Popular music ==
- William Crosswell – "Lord, Lead the Way the Saviour Went" (hymn)
- "America (My Country, 'Tis of Thee)", words by Samuel Francis Smith (1831), air: "God Save the King"

== Classical music ==
- Hector Berlioz
  - Overture 'King Lear', H 53
  - Intrata di Rob-Roy MacGregor, H 54
  - Méditation religieuse, H 56
  - La captive, H 60
- Frédéric Chopin – Arrangement of "Casta Diva"
- Carl Czerny – Piano Sonata No.10, Op. 268
- Johann Wenzel Kalliwoda – Divertissement in F major, Op.28
- Franz Lachner – Fragen
- Felix Mendelssohn
  - Piano Concerto No. 1, Opus 25 (premièred October 17 in Munich)
  - Die erste Walpurgisnacht, secular cantata, Opus 60 (first version)
- George Onslow – Symphony No. 2 in D Minor, Opus 42
- Gioachino Rossini – Stabat Mater (composition begins, premiere in 1842)
- Robert Schumann
  - Papillons
  - Allegro, Op.8
- Johann Strauss Sr
  - Einzugs-Galopp, Op.35
  - Souvenir de Baden, Op.38
  - Sperl-Galopp, Op.42
  - Der Raub der Sabinerinnen, Op.43
  - Tivoli-Freudenfest-Tänze, Op.45
  - Vive la Danse!, Op.47
  - Das Leben ein Tanz, Op.49
- Richard Wagner
  - 7 Kompositionen zu Goethe's Faust, WWV 15
  - Concert Overture No.1 in D minor, WWV 20
  - Piano Sonata in B-flat major, WWV 21
  - Fantasia in F-sharp minor, WWV 22
  - Polonaise in D major, WWV 23
  - Incidental Music to 'König Enzio', WWV 24
  - Piano Sonata in A major, WWV 26

== Opera ==
- Vincenzo Bellini
  - Norma
  - La Sonnambula
- Carlo Coccia – Edoardo in Iscozia
- Louis Joseph Ferdinand Herold – Zampa
- Giacomo Meyerbeer – Robert le diable

== Births ==
- January 15 – Albert Niemann, operatic tenor (d. 1917)
- February 21
  - Henri Meilhac, opera librettist (d. 1897)
  - Eduard Rappoldi, composer (died 1903)
- February 26 – Filippo Marchetti, opera composer (d. 1902)
- February 28 – Carl Kölling, composer for piano (d. 1914)
- May 24 – Richard Hoffman, composer and pianist (d. 1909)
- June 10 – Silverio Franconetti, flamenco singer (d. 1889)
- June 26 – Julius Rodenberg, lyricist (died 1914)
- June 28 – Joseph Joachim, violinist (d. 1907)
- July 7 – Eugène Ketterer, pianist and composer (d. 1870)
- July 16 – Pyotr Veinberg, lyricist (died 1908)
- August 1 – Antonio Cotogni, operatic baritone (d. 1901)
- August 13 – Salomon Jadassohn, composer, teacher and theorist (d. 1902)
- August 28 – Ludvig Norman, Swedish composer (d. 1885)
- September 4 – Daniel Godfrey, bandleader and composer (died 1903)
- September 5 – Victorien Sardou, librettist (died 1908)
- December 10 – Philippe Gille, opera librettist (d. 1901)
- December 25 – Johann von Herbeck, composer and musician (died 1877)
- date unknown
  - Julius Gerber, composer (died 1883)

== Deaths ==
- January 6 – Rodolphe Kreutzer, violinist, conductor and composer (b. 1766)
- January 8 – Franz Krommer, composer (b. 1759)
- January 21 – Achim von Arnim, publisher and lyricist (born 1781)
- March 4 – Georg Michael Telemann, theologian and composer (b. 1748)
- March 12 – Friedrich von Matthisson, dedicatee and lyricist (born 1761)
- April 13 – Ferdinand Kauer, pianist and composer (b. 1751)
- June 23 – Mateo Albéniz, composer (b. 1755)
- July 25 – Maria Agata Szymanowska, composer (b. 1789)
- August 5 – Sébastien Érard, maker of pianos and harps (b. 1752)
- September 8 – John Aitken, music publisher (b. c. 1745)
- September 15 – Andrea Leone Tottola, Italian librettist
- September 18 – Peter Hänsel, German composer (born 1770)
- November 14 – Ignaz Pleyel, piano-maker and pupil of Joseph Haydn (b. 1757)
- November 30 – Catharine Frydendahl, opera singer (b. 1760)
- date unknown
  - Domenico Gilardoni, composer and librettist (born 1798)
  - Peter Anton Kreusser, composer (b. 1765)
  - Guillaume Lasceux, composer and organist (born 1740)
  - Benedicto Sáenz the elder, cathedral organist of Guatemala
