= 1849 in music =

List of years in music	(table)
- … 1839; 1840; 1841; 1842; 1843; 1844; 1845; 1846; 1847; 1848; 1849; 1850; 1851; 1852; 1853; 1854; 1855; 1856; 1857; 1858; 1859 …
- Art; Archaeology; Architecture; Literature; Music; Philosophy; Science; +...

== Events ==
- April 16 – Giacomo Meyerbeer's grand opera Le prophète is premièred (after a decade in preparation) by the Paris Opera at the Salle Le Peletier with Pauline Viardot (who has collaborated extensively in the production) in the mezzo-soprano role, her first with the Opera. Stage effects include electric light, ballet on roller skates and the use of saxhorns. The audience includes Napoleon III (new Emperor of France), Berlioz, the terminally ill Chopin, and Turgenev. Its world tour begins on July 24 in London.
- May 3–9 – Richard Wagner is an active participant in the May Uprising in Dresden, suppressed by the Kingdom of Saxony, and is forced to flee to Zürich.
- September 22 – Johann Strauss I fails to turn up to a banquet in honour of Field Marshal Joseph Radetzky von Radetz, where he is expected to perform a new work. His absence is explained by the fact that he had contracted scarlet fever from one of his illegitimate children while working on the new composition; he dies a few days later in Vienna aged 45.
- October 30 – Funeral of Frédéric Chopin (who has died aged 39, probably of pericarditis aggravated by tuberculosis) at La Madeleine, Paris, followed by burial of his body at Père Lachaise Cemetery.
- November – Hungarian pianist and composer Stephen Heller makes his first visit to London on a concert tour.
- The autograph manuscript of Bach's Brandenburg Concertos is rediscovered in the archives of Brandenburg by Siegfried Wilhelm Dehn.

== Classical music ==
- Hector Berlioz – Te Deum
- Frederic Chopin - Mazurka in F minor, WN 65 (last composition)
- Jakob Dont – 24 Etudes or Caprices, Op. 35
- Stephen Heller – 25 Etudes, Op. 47
- Karol Lipinski – Fantaisie sur des airs napolitains nationaux, Op. 31
- Franz Liszt
  - Dante Sonata
  - Tasso
  - Totentanz
  - Funérailles
  - Three Concert Études
  - Deuxième année: Italie
- Hans Christian Lumbye
  - Amalia Vals
  - Caroline Polka Mazurka
- Ludvig Norman – Piano Trio No. 1 in D major, Op. 4
- Franz Schubert (died 1828) – Symphony No. 9 in C major (completed 1826 – first published)
- Robert Schumann
  - Fantasiestücke, Op. 73
  - Manfred Op. 115, overture and Incidental music
  - 3 Romances for Oboe and Piano
- Johann Strauss, Jr.
  - Annika-Quadrille, Op. 53
  - Burschen-Lieder Walzer, Op. 55
  - Einheits-Klänge Walzer, Op. 62
  - Fantasiebilder Walzer, Op. 64
  - D'Woaldbuama, Op. 66

== Opera ==
- Giacomo Meyerbeer – Le prophète
- Otto Nicolai – The Merry Wives of Windsor
- Lauro Rossi – Il domino nero
- Ambrose Thomas – Le caïd
- Giuseppe Verdi – La battaglia di Legnano

== Popular music ==
- "Dolcy Jones" by Stephen Foster
- "Nelly Was a Lady" by Stephen Foster
- "Once in Royal David's City", words: Cecil Frances Alexander, music: Henry Gauntlett. The words were written as a poem by Mrs Alexander in 1848.
- "Santa Lucia" (first published version)

== Births ==
- May 25 – Thomas "Blind Tom" Wiggins, composer and pianist (d. 1908)
- May 26 – Hubert von Herkomer, artist and composer (d. 1914)
- July 4 – Antonina Miliukova, wife of Pyotr Ilyich Tchaikovsky (d. 1917)
- July 18 – Anna Judic, entertainer (d. 1911)
- July 22 – Géza Zichy, disabled pianist (d. 1924)
- August 18 – Benjamin Godard, violinist and composer (d. 1895)
- August 20 – Selina Dolaro, actress and singer (d. 1889)
- September 22 – Olena Falkman, concert vocalist (d. 1928)
- December 4 – Ernesto Köhler, flautist and composer (d. 1907)
- December 14 – François Cellier, conductor and composer (d. 1914)

== Deaths ==
- February 8 – François Antoine Habeneck, violinist and conductor (b. 1781)
- May 11 – Otto Nicolai, composer (b. 1810)
- June 3 – François de Fossa, guitarist and composer (b. 1775)
- June 10 – Friedrich Kalkbrenner, pianist and composer (b. 1785)
- September 25 – Johann Strauss I, composer (b. 1804)
- October 17 – Frédéric Chopin, pianist and composer (b. 1810)
- December 14 – Conradin Kreutzer, conductor and composer (b. 1780)
- December 29 – Dionisio Aguado, guitarist and composer (b. 1784)
- Unknown day – Júlia Gusztinyi, soprano

·
