= Philippe Decker =

Luxembourgish composer and conductor

Philippe Decker (12 February 1840 – 9 February 1881) was a Luxembourgish composer and conductor. In 1872, he became a music teacher at the Athenaeum, before becoming a military bandmaster in 1879.

He composed an extensive amount of music for wind orchestra and other ensembles.
