= 1841 in music =

== Events ==
- April 13 – The first Dresden opera house in Germany opens with the performance of a work by Carl Maria von Weber.
- December 27 – Franz Liszt gives a piano recital at the Sing-Akademie zu Berlin to an enthusiastic audience, retrospectively marked as the beginning of Lisztomania, which will accompany his tours across Europe during the decade.
- Robert Schumann writes two symphonies: Symphony No. 1 in B-flat major, opus 38 (also called the "Spring" symphony), and Symphony No. 4 in D minor, opus 120. (The D-minor symphony is edited extensively by Schumann in 1851, and thus is given a much later opus number and subsequently referred to as No. 4, although it is actually his second.)
- Tenor Domenico Donzelli retires from the stage.
- Nikolay Afanas'yev resigns as concertmaster of the Bolshoi Theatre Orchestra in order to conduct the serf orchestra of a wealthy landowner at Vïksa, near St Petersburg.

== Popular music ==
- August Heinrich Hoffmann – "Deutschlandlied" (to music written in 1797 by Joseph Haydn)

== Classical music ==
- Adolphe Adam – Giselle (ballet)
- Hector Berlioz
  - Rêverie et Caprice, H 88
  - Les nuits d'été
- Frederic Chopin
  - Ballade No. 3
  - Fantaisie in F minor
- Theodor Kullak – Cavatine de Robert le Diable
- Friedrich August Kummer – 2 Concert Duos for Violin and Cello, Op. 67
- Joseph Lanner – Abend-Sterne Walzer, Op.180
- Henry Lemoine – Études enfantines, Op. 37
- Jans Christian Lumbye – Döbler's Zauber Galop
- Felix Mendelssohn
  - Variations sérieuses
  - Antigone, Op. 55
  - Allegro brillant, Op.92
- Clara Schumann
  - Die gute Nacht, die ich dir sage
  - Lieder, Op. 12
- Robert Schumann
  - Symphony No.1, Op. 38
  - Overture, Scherzo and Finale, Op. 52
  - Symphony No.4, Op. 120
- Fernando Sor
  - Le calme, Op. 50
  - Divertissement for 2 Guitars, Op. 62
- Johann Strauss Sr
  - Amors-Pfeile, Op. 123
  - Elektrische Funken, Op. 125
- Johannes Verhulst – Symphony in E minor

== Opera ==
- Daniel Auber – Les diamants de la couronne
- Michael William Balfe – Keolanthe
- Gaetano Donizetti – Adelia
- Fromental Halévy
  - Charles VI
  - La reine de Chypre
- Franz Lachner – Caterina Cornaro
- Giovanni Pacini – L'uomo del mistero

== Births ==
- January 15 – Thorvald Lammers, singer, conductor and composer (died 1922)
- January 18 – Emmanuel Chabrier, composer (died 1894)
- January 23 – Sigismund Bachrich, violinist and composer (died 1913)
- January 28 – Viktor Nessler, composer (died 1890)
- January 31 – Michael Maybrick, composer and singer, better known as "Stephen Adams" (died 1913)
- February 10 – Sir Walter Parratt, organist and composer (died 1924)
- February 19
  - Elfrida Andrée, organist, conductor and composer (died 1929)
  - Felipe Pedrell, composer (died 1922)
- March 1 – Romualdo Marenco, composer for ballet (died 1907)
- March 13 – Julius Prott (also known as Guilio Perotti), German operatic tenor (died 1901)
- May 15 – Giovanni Bolzoni, violinist and composer (died 1919)
- May 21 – Joseph Parry, composer (died 1903)
- May 28 – Giovanni Sgambati, Italian composer, pianist, and conductor
- June 16 – David Popper, cellist (died 1913)
- July 9 – Carl Christian Lumbye, Danish composer, son of Hans Christian Lumbye
- July 11 – Daniël de Lange, composer (died 1918)
- July 18 – Hedvig Willman, Swedish opera singer (died 1887)
- September 8 – Antonín Dvořák, composer (died 1904)
- September 26 – Signor Brocolini, opera singer (died 1906)
- October 11 – Friedrich Hegar, violinist, conductor and composer (died 1927)
- November 4 – Karl Tausig, pianist and composer (died 1871)
- November 29 – Joe Wilson, singer and songwriter (died 1875)
- December 14 – Louise Héritte-Viardot, singer (died 1918)
- date unknown – Apollon Hussakovskyi, composer (died 1875)

== Deaths ==
- January 25 – Maria Anna Thekla Mozart, "Marianne", cousin and correspondent of Wolfgang Amadeus Mozart (born 1758)
- February 14 – Antun Sorkočević, diplomat, writer and composer (born 1775)
- February 17 – Ferdinando Carulli, composer for guitar (born 1770)
- May 18 – John Thomson, composer (born 1805)
- June 12 – Konstantinos Nikolopoulos, archaeologist and composer (born 1786)
- July 3 – Rosemond Mountain, actress and singer (born 1780s?)
- August 13 – Bernhard Romberg, cellist and composer (born 1767)
- August 24
  - Friedrich Curschmann, songwriter and singer (born 1805)
  - Theodore Hook, writer and composer (born 1788)
- August 27 – Ignaz von Seyfried, conductor and composer (born 1776)
- September 15 – Alessandro Rolla, violinist, composer and music teacher (born 1757)
- September 16 – Thomas John Dibdin, songwriter (born 1771)
- October 16 – Domenico Barbaia, impresario (born 1778)
- October 28 – Francesco Morlacchi, composer (born 1784)
- December 22 – Daniil Kashin, pianist, conductor and composer (born 1769)
- date unknown – Justina Casagli, opera singer (born 1794) (suicide)
