= 1825 in music =

This article is about music-related events in 1825.

== Events ==
- March 21 – British première of Ludwig van Beethoven's Symphony No. 9 (1824) is presented by the Philharmonic Society of London.
- May – Chopin performs for Tsar Alexander I in Warsaw.
- Singer Maria Malibran (as Maria García) makes her operatic debut as Rosina in The Barber of Seville at the King's Theatre in London.
- September – In Vienna:
  - Joseph Lanner and Johann Strauss I quarrel, and Strauss leaves Lanner's orchestra.
  - Danish composer and pianist Friedrich Kuhlau, on an extended visit to the city, meets Beethoven.
- November 29 – A touring opera company led by Manuel García performs Rossini's The Barber of Seville in New York City, the first opera to be sung in Italian in the Americas. The troupe includes his daughters Maria, who meets and hastily marries banker Francois Eugene Malibran, and Pauline.
- December 10 – François-Adrien Boieldieu's opéra comique La dame blanche is premièred by the Opéra-Comique at the Théâtre Feydeau in Paris.

== Classical music ==
- Juan Crisóstomo Arriaga – Symphony in D major
- Ludwig van Beethoven
  - String Quartet No. 12 in E-flat major
  - String Quartet No. 13 in B-flat major
  - String Quartet No. 15 in A Minor
- Johann Baptist Cramer - Piano Concerto No. 8, Op. 70
- Jean-François Lesueur – Te Deum (for the coronation of King Charles X of France)
- Felix Mendelssohn – Octet for Strings
- Franz Schubert
  - Ellens Gesang III
  - Piano Sonata in A minor

== Opera ==
- Vincenzo Bellini – Adelson e Salvini
- Gaetano Donizetti – Alahor in Granata
- Franz Grillparzer - König Ottokars Glück und Ende (written 1923, premiered February 19, 1825 in Vienna's Burgtheater].
- Franz Liszt – Don Sanche ou le Chateau d'Amour (Don Sanche or the Castle of Love)
- Giovanni Pacini – L'ultimo giorno di Pompei
- Nicola Vaccai – Giulietta e Romeo

== Popular music ==
- "Cherry Ripe" – w. Robert Herrick m. Charles Edward Horn
- "Ich hatt' einen Kameraden" w. Ludwig Uhland (1809) m. Friedrich Silcher (1825)
- "The Minstrel's Return'd From The War" – John Hill Hewitt

== Births ==
- January 23 – Louis Ehlert, composer and music critic (d. 1884)
- February 28 – Jean-Baptiste Arban, cornet virtuoso and conductor (d. 1889)
- March 12 – August Manns, conductor (d. 1907)
- June 24 – Jovan Sundečić, poet and lyricist (d. 1900)
- June 30 – Hervé, singer, conductor and composer of operettas (d. 1892)
- August 9 – Gaetano Antoniazzi, violin-maker (d. 1897)
- August 21 – Kate Loder, pianist and composer (d. 1904)
- August 22 – Julius Schulhoff, pianist and composer (d. 1898)
- August 24 – Charles Wels, pianist, organist, composer and music teacher (d. 1906)
- September 25 – Johann Strauss II, conductor and composer (d. 1899)
- December 19 – George Frederick Bristow, composer (d. 1898)
- date unknown – Balbina Steffenone, operatic soprano (d. 1896)

== Deaths ==
- February 5 – Pierre Gaveaux, operatic tenor and composer (b. 1761)
- March 24 – Giovanni Domenico Perotti, composer (b. 1761)
- May 6 – Lady Anne Barnard, balladeer (b. 1750)
- May 7 – Antonio Salieri, composer (b. 1750)
- May 12 – Elias Mann (b. 1750)
- July 10 – Ludwig Fischer, operatic bass (b. 1745)
- July 29 – Micah Hawkins, composer and writer (b. 1777)
- August 3 – Ambrogio Minoja, composer (b. 1752)
- August 17 – Rayner Taylor, composer (b. 1747)
- August 23 – Amos Bull, composer (b. 1744)
- September 13 – Luigi Bassi, operatic baritone (b. 1766)
- November 1 – Rodrigo Ferreira da Costa, composer
- November 12 – Joseph Reinagle, string and horn player, trumpeter and composer (b. 1762)
- November 19 – Jan Václav Voříšek, pianist, organist and composer (b. 1791)
- December 29 – Giuseppe Maria Gioacchino Cambini, composer
- December 30 – Peter Gronland, composer
- probable – Giuseppe Cambini, violinist and composer (b. 1746)
