= 1770 in music =

== Events ==
- January 20 – The new Théâtre du Palais-Royal (rue Saint-Honoré), the first purpose-built opera house in Paris, designed by Pierre-Louis Moreau-Desproux, is inaugurated with a performance of Rameau's Zoroastre.
- May 16 – The new Opéra royal de Versailles, designed by Ange-Jacques Gabriel, is inaugurated.
- Ballet is performed in Oslo for the first time, by Madame Stuart.
- Musikalisches Vielerley is published; a collection of pieces from various composers, edited by Carl Philipp Emanuel Bach (Hamburg: Michael Christian Bock).

== Classical music ==
- Carl Philipp Emanuel Bach – Fantasia in D minor, H.224
- Johann Christian Bach
  - 6 Keyboard Concertos, Op. 7
  - 6 Quartets, Op. 8
- Luigi Boccherini – Cello Concerto in D major, G.479
- Joseph Haydn – Baryton Trio in A major, Hob.XI:2
- Gabriele Leone – Six sonatas for mandolin and bass marked with signs according to the new method, Op. 2
- Wolfgang Amadeus Mozart – Symphony 11
- Pietro Nardini – Sonatas for 2 Flutes/Violins and Basso Continuo

== Methods and theory writings ==
- Johann Caspar Heck – The Art of Playing the Harpsichord
- John Holden – An Essay Towards a Rational System of Music

== Operas ==
- Christoph Willibald Gluck – Paride ed Elena, Wq.39
- André Grétry – Les deux avares

== Published popular music ==
- William Billings – The New England Psalm Singer, featuring the song Chester.

== Births ==
- February 18 – Christian Heinrich Rinck, composer (died 1846)
- February 20 – Ferdinando Carulli, composer (died 1841)
- February 22 – Jan Matyas Nepomuk August Vitasek, composer (died 1839)
- February 26 – Antoine Reicha, composer (died 1836)
- May 19 – Antoine-Charles Glachant, violinist and composer (died 1851)
- June 4 – James Hewitt, composer (died 1827)
- November 8 – Friedrich Witt, composer (died 1836)
- November 29 – Peter Hänsel, composer
- December 13 – John Clarke-Whitfeld, composer (died 1836)
- December 15 or December 16 (baptized on December 17) – Ludwig van Beethoven, composer and pianist (died 1827)
- December 17 – Johann Friedrich Schubert, composer

== Deaths ==
- February 26 – Giuseppe Tartini, violinist and composer, 77
- April 19 – Esprit Antoine Blanchard, composer, 74
- May 9 – Charles Avison, composer, 61
- October 1 – Louis-Gabriel Guillemain, composer, 64
- December 9 – Gottlieb Muffat, organist and composer, 80
- December 13 – Johann Heinrich Hartmann Bätz, organ-builder, 61
