= The Man and Men =

British opera

The Man and Men is a one-act opera by British composer Joshua Goodman. The libretto is by Tom Riley.

== Production ==
Goodman wrote the opera as his final graduation piece for his studies at Huddersfield University. The work was premiered at the Edinburgh Festival Fringe in August 2010 by North of England Concert Theatre, an interdisciplinary music-theatre company based in Huddersfield, UK. The opera has no plot but focuses on issues of masculine sexual identity and human loss. It is orchestrated for soprano, saxophone, piano, percussion, cello and double bass.

== Critical response ==
The reviewer from the Independent was "reasonably impressed", appreciating flashes of lyricism behind the modishness, adding "It's not every day you get to see a soprano bend a percussionist backwards over an upturned bucket and use his arms as beaters." The Stage was more critical, praising soprano Ema Walton's three and a half octave range, while criticising its lyrical incoherence and moments of pretentiousness.
