= 1686 in music =

This is a list of notable events in music that took place in the year 1686.

== Classical music ==
- Michel Richard Delalande – Ecce nunc benedicte, S.8
- Henry Du Mont – Benedic anima mea
- Johann Caspar Kerll
  - Modulatio organica
  - Toccata cromatica con durezze e ligature
- Marin Mariais – Pièces de viole, Livre 1
- Johann Christoph Pezel – Opus musicum sonatarum praestantissimarum (The "Alphabet Sonatas")
- Henry Purcell
  - Ye Tuneful Muses
  - (attrib.) – "Lillibullero"
- Vasily Titov – Psaltïr' rifmovannaya (Псалтырь рифмованная or Псалтырь римфотворная), vocal polyphonic setting of the Russian psalter
- Giuseppe Torelli – 10 Sonate a 3, with basso continuo, Op. 1
- Robert de Visée – Livre de pièces pour la guitare

== Opera ==
- Jean-Baptiste Lully
  - Acis et Galatée, LWV 73
  - Armide, LWV 71
- Giacomo Antonio Perti– L'incoronazione di Dario
- Alessandro Scarlatti – Olimpia vendicata

== Births ==
- July 31 (or August 1) – Benedetto Marcello, composer (died 1739)
- August 17 – Nicola Porpora, composer (died 1768)
- September – Charles Young, organist and composer (died 1758)
- October 31 – Senesino, castrato singer (died 1758)
- December 15 – Jean-Joseph Fiocco, composer (died 1746)
- December 25 – Giovanni Battista Somis, violinist and composer (died 1763)

== Deaths ==
- c. November – John Playford, music publisher (born 1623)
- probable – Augustin Pfleger, composer (born 1635)
