= Amos Bull =

American composer

Amos Bull (1744–1825) was one of the first American composers. In 1795 he compiled The Responsary, which included British psalm tunes along with 37 hymns and 12 anthems by Bull himself, for use in New England churches of the time.
