= 1894 in music =

Events in the year 1894 in music.

== Specific locations ==
- 1894 in Norwegian music

== Events ==
- March 14 – Johan Svendsen conducts the world premiere of Carl Nielsen's Symphony No. 1 in Copenhagen.
- April 19 – Jules Massenet's opera "Werther" is staged in New York City.
- September 22 – Opening of the Teatro Lirico Internazionale in Milan.
- December 22 – Claude Debussy's Prélude à l'après-midi d'un faune is premiered in Paris

== Published popular music ==
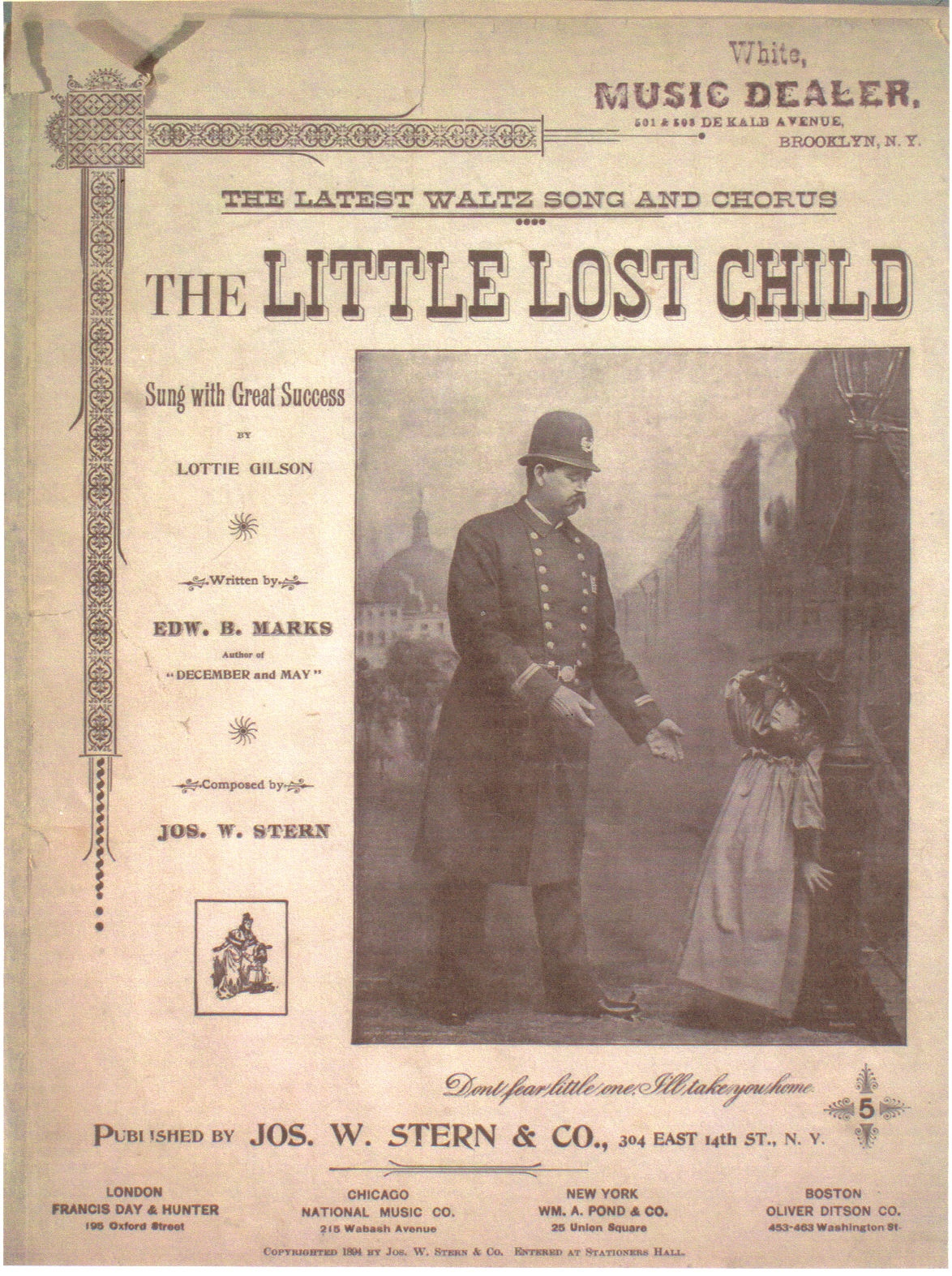
The Little Lost Child sheet music cover

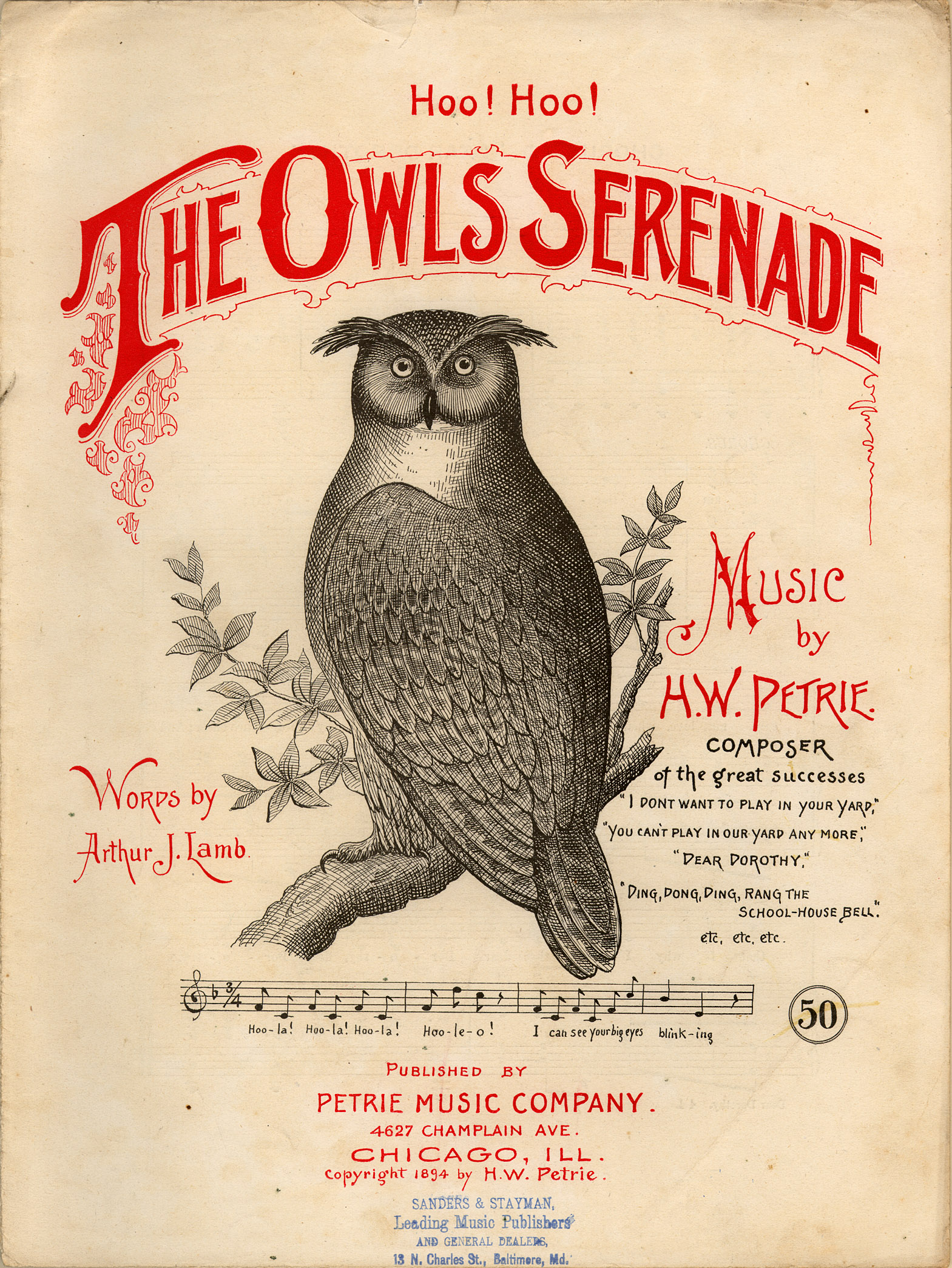
Owls' Serenade sheet music cover

- "Airy, Fairy Lillian" w. Tony Raymond m. Maurice Levi
- "And Her Golden Hair Was Hanging Down Her Back" w. Monroe H. Rosenfeld m. Felix McGlennon
- "At Trinity Church I Met My Doom" w.m. Fred Gilbert
- "Don't Be Cross" by Karl Zeller from the operetta Der Obersteiger
- "Forgotten" w. Flora Wulschner m. Eugene Cowles
- "He's Got To Keep A-Movin'" w.m. T. W. Connor
- "His Last Thoughts Were Of You" w. Edward B. Marks m. Joseph W. Stern
- "The Honeymoon March" m. George Rosey
- "I Don't Want To Play In Your Yard" w. Philip Wingate m. Henry W. Petrie
- "If It Wasn't For The 'Ouses In Between" w. Edgar Bateman m. George Le Brunn
- "I'll Be True To My Honey Boy" w.m. George Evans
- "I've Been Working on the Railroad" w.m. trad (first copyright 1894)
- "I Can't Change It!" w.m. T.W. Connor
- "Kathleen" w.m. Helene Mora
- "Little Kinkies" w.m. M. Tobias
- "The Little Lost Child" w. Edward B. Marks m. Joseph W. Stern
- "Long Ago In Alcala" w. Frederick Edward Weatherley & Adrian Ross m. André Messager
- "My Friend The Major" w.m. E. W. Rogers
- "My Pearl Is A Bowery Girl" w. William Jerome m. Andrew Mack
- "Oh! That Gorgonzola Cheese" w. Fred W. Leigh m. Harry Champion
- "The Owls Serenade" w. Arthur J. Lamb, m. H.W. Petrie
- "She Is More To Be Pitied Than Censured" w.m. William B. Gray
- "She May Have Seen Better Days" w.m. James Thornton
- "Sweet Bunch of Daisies" w.m. Anita Owen
- "The Sidewalks of New York" w.m. Charles B. Lawlor & James W. Blake
- "Why Did Nellie Leave Home?" by George M. Cohan
- "Yale Society Two-Step" by Chas. L. Van Baar
- "You've Been A Good Old Wagon But You've Done Broke Down" by Ben Harney

== Recorded popular music ==
Daisy Bell sung by Edward M. Favor
1894 Edison Phonograph Company brown wax cylinder recording of "Daisy Bell", composed by Harry Dacre.

- "And Her Golden Hair was Hanging Down Her Back" – Dan W. Quinn (Berliner Records)
- "Daisy Bell" – Edward M. Favor (Edison Records)
- "Keep Movin'" – Standard Quartette (Columbia Records)
- "The Liberty Bell (march)" – United States Marine Band (Columbia Records)
- ”Marc Anthony's Curse” - David C. Bangs (Berliner Records)
- "My Pearl is a Bowery Girl" – Dan W. Quinn (Berliner Records)
- "The Black Knights Templar" – George J. Gaskin (Berliner Records)
- ”The Sword of Bunker Hill” – Samuel Ross (Berliner Records)
- ”The Village Blacksmith” – David C. Bangs (Berliner Records)
- "Yankee Doodle" – Vess Ossman (Edison Records)

== Classical music ==
- Anton Arensky – Piano Trio No. 1 in D minor, Op. 32
- Agathe Backer-Grøndahl
  - Norske Folkeviser og Folkedanse, Op. 33
  - Norwegian Folk Songs, Op. 34
  - 3 Claverstykker, Op. 35
- Johannes Brahms – Two Clarinet Sonatas, Op. 120
- Claude Debussy
  - Prélude à l'après-midi d'un faune
  - Proses lyriques
- Antonín Dvořák
  - Biblical Songs, Op. 99
  - Humoresques (Dvořák) Op. 101 (B. 187) for piano
  - American Suite for piano (orchestrated a year later)
- Robert Fuchs – Serenade No. 5 in D, Op. 53
- Alexander Gretchaninov – String Quartet No. 1 in G major, Op. 2
- Edvard Grieg
  - 5 Songs of Norway, Op. 58
  - 5 Songs, Op. 60
- Victor Herbert – Concerto for Cello No. 2 in E minor
- Mikhail Ippolitov-Ivanov – Caucasian Sketches, Suite No. 1, Op. 10
- Joseph Jongen – Quartet for Strings No. 1 in C minor, Op. 3
- August Klughardt – String Quintet, Op. 62
- Alexander Kopylov – String Quartet No. 2 in F major, Op. 23
- Theodor Leschetizky – 2 Pieces, Op. 43
- Gustav Mahler – Symphony No. 2
- Carl Nielsen
  - Symphony No. 1 in G minor
  - Snefrid, CNW 4
  - Symphonisk Suite, Op. 8
- Josef Rheinberger – Horn Sonata in E-flat major, Op. 178
- Nikolai Rimsky-Korsakov – 2 Piano Pieces, Op. 38
- Adolphe Samuel – Symphony No. 7, Op. 48
- Alexander Scriabin – 12 Études, Op. 8
- Charles Villiers Stanford – 6 Elizabethan Pastorals, Op. 53
- Wilhelm Stenhammar
  - Piano Concerto No. 1, Op. 1, premiered March 17 in Stockholm
  - String Quartet No. 1 in C major, Op. 2
- Sigismond Stojowski – 2 Orientales, Op. 10
- Louis Vierne – String Quartet in D minor, Op. 12

== Opera ==
- Granville Bantock – The Pearl of Iran
- Julius Bechgaard – Frau Inge
- Herman Bemberg – Cleopatra
- Frederick Delius – The Magic Fountain
- Charles-Édouard Lefebvre – Djelma premiered on May 25 at the Théâtre de l'Opéra in Paris
- Hamish MacCunn – Jeanie Deans
- Jules Massenet
  - La Navarraise
  - Le portrait de Manon
  - Thaïs (opera) 16 March at the Opéra Garnier
- Emile Pessard – Le muet
- Emil Nikolaus von Reznicek – Donna Diana
- Sergei Taneyev – Oresteia (completed 1894, premiered 1895)

== Musical theater ==
- A Gaiety Girl – Broadway production opened at Daly's Theatre on September 17 and ran for 81 performances
- The Mine Foreman – Austrian production opened at the Theater an der Wien on January 5
- The Passing Show – Broadway production opened at the Casino Theatre on May 5
- Rob Roy, premiered in Detroit on October 1; Broadway production opened at the Herald Square Theatre on October 29 and ran for 168 performances
- The Shop Girl – London production opened at the Gaiety Theatre on November 24 and ran for 546 performances
- A Trip To Chinatown – London production opened at Toole's Theatre on September 29 and ran for 125 performances

== Births ==
- January 3 – Benito Canónico, Venezuelan composer (d. 1971)
- January 31 – Isham Jones, American bandleader and composer (d. 1956)
- February 1 – James P. Johnson, American jazz pianist and composer.
- February 11 – Alfonso Leng, Chilean dentist and part-time classical composer (d. 1974)
- February 20 – Jimmy Yancey, American jazz pianist
- April 3 – Dooley Wilson, African American pianist and singer (d. 1953)
- April 15 – Bessie Smith, American blues singer (d. 1937)
- April 27 – Nicolas Slonimsky, Russian-born American conductor and composer (d. 1995)
- May 10 – Dimitri Tiomkin, Russian-born American film music composer, pianist and conductor (d. 1979)
- May 29 – Beatrice Lillie, Canadian actress and singer (d. 1989)
- June 1 – Percival Mackey, English pianist, film music composer and bandleader (d. 1950)
- June 4 – La Bolduc (Mary Travers), Québécois singer (d. 1941)
- June 10 – Punch Miller, American Dixieland jazz trumpeter (d. 1971)
- July 10 – Jimmy McHugh, American songwriter and pianist (d. 1969)
- August 15 – Harry Akst, American songwriter and pianist (d. 1963)
- August 26 – Arthur Loesser, pianist and musicologist (died 1969)
- September 3 – Marie Dubas, French music-hall singer (d. 1972)
- September 18 – Willard Robison, American songwriter and bandleader (d. 1968)
- September 25 – J. Mayo Williams, African American blues music producer (d. 1980)
- September 26 – Vaughn De Leath, American crooner, "The Original Radio Girl" (d. 1943)
- December 31 – Ernest John Moeran, British composer (d. 1950)

== Deaths ==
- January 13 – Nadezhda von Meck, patron of Tchaikovsky (b. 1831)
- January 21 – Guillaume Lekeu, composer (b. 1870) (typhoid)
- January 24 - Laura Schirmer Mapleson, American opera singer (b. 1862)
- January 30 – Giovanni Masutto, Italian musicologist and flautist (b. 1830)
- February 4
  - Louis Lewandowski, composer (b. 1821)
  - Adolphe Sax, Belgian instrument maker, inventor of the saxophone (b. 1814)
- February 11 – Emilio Arrieta, composer (b. 1823)
- February 12 – Hans von Bülow, pianist, conductor and composer (b. 1830)
- February 18 – Camillo Sivori, violinist and composer (b. 1815)
- March 21 – Jakob Rosenhain, pianist and composer (b. 1813)
- April 12 – Ludwig Pfau, lyricist and revolutionary (born 1821)
- April 13
  - Marie Carandini, opera singer (b. 1826)
  - Philipp Spitta, musicologist and biographer of Bach (b. 1841)
- June 5 – Marcelina Czartoryska, pianist and aristocrat (born 1817)
- June 9 – Juventino Rosas, violinist and composer (b. 1868)
- June 23 – Marietta Alboni, operatic contralto (b. 1826)
- July 17 – Leconte de Lisle, lyricist (born 1818)
- July 26 – Eduard Tauwitz, composer (b. 1812)
- September 13 – Emmanuel Chabrier, composer (b. 1841)
- September 21 – Emma Fursch-Madi, operatic soprano (b. 1847)
- October 16 – Johanna Jachmann-Wagner, opera singer, actress and music teacher (b. 1826)
- October 27 – Carl Ploug, Danish lyricist, song writer, editor, and politician (born 1813)
- October 28 – Rudolf Hildebrand, historian of the German folk song (b. 1824)
- November 4 – Eugène Oudin, composer (b. 1858)
- November 20 – Anton Rubinstein, pianist and composer (b. 1829)
