= 1890 in music =

Events in the year 1890 in music.

== Specific locations ==
- 1890 in Norwegian music

== Events ==
- January 15 – Pyotr Ilyich Tchaikovsky's The Sleeping Beauty (ballet) premieres at the Mariinsky Theatre in St. Petersburg.
- January–June period – George W. Johnson becomes the first African American to record phonograph cylinders, in New York.
- June 21 – Richard Strauss conducts the premiere of his symphonic poem Death and Transfiguration at the Eisenach Festival.
- September 3 – Carl Nielsen makes the first entry in his diary.
- September 9 – Edward Elgar's concert overture Froissart is premiered at the Three Choirs Festival in Worcester.
- December 6 – 7 – First full performance of Hector Berlioz's opera Les Troyens takes place at Karlsruhe, 21 years after the composer's death.
- Charles-Marie Widor succeeds César Franck as organ professor at the Paris Conservatoire.
- The New York Phonograph Company opens the first recording studio.

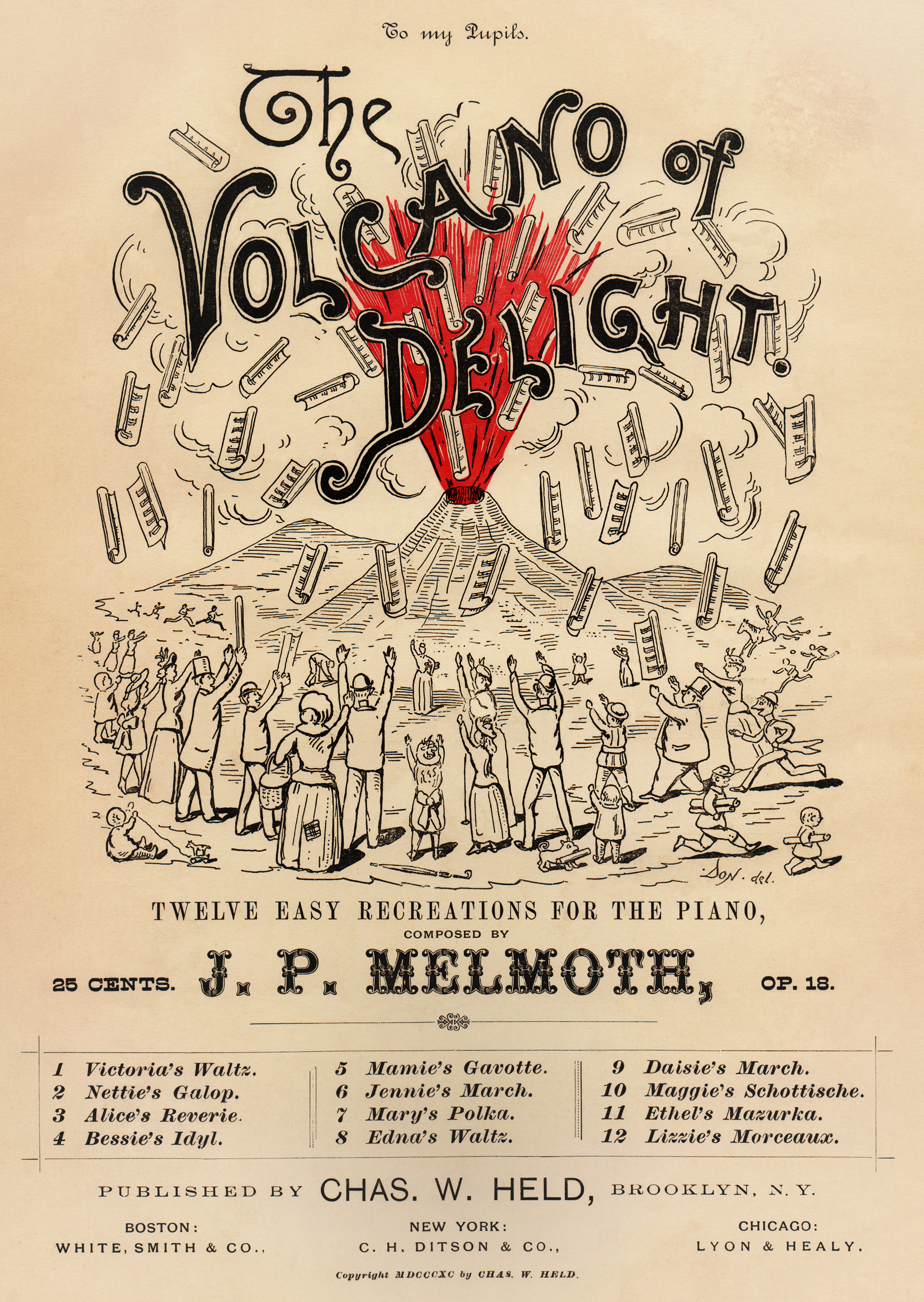
1890 sheet music cover

== Published popular music ==
- "The Commodore Song"
- "I was Dreaming" – August Juncker
- "Little Pig Went To Market" by J. Cheever Goodwin & Gustave Kerker
- "Maggie Murphy's Home" w. Edward Harrigan m. David Braham
- "Passing By" w. Robert Herrick m. Edward C. Purcell
- "Star of the East" w. George Cooper m. Amanda Kennedy
- "Throw Him Down McCloskey" w.m. John W. Kelly
- "You'll Miss Lots of Fun When You're Married" by John Philip Sousa & Edward M. Taber

== Recorded popular music ==
- "Banjo Duet" – Bohee Minstrels
- The Charge of the Light Brigade (bugle charge) – Trumpeter Martin Landfried
- "Down upon the Suwannee River" – Professor Baton's Brass and String Military Band
- "Everybody's Darling" – Duffy and Imgrund's Fifth Regiment Band
- "La Media Noche" – United States Marine Band
- "Semper Fidelis" – United States Marine Band
- "The Song That Reached My Heart" – Duffy & Imgrund's Fifth Regiment Band
- "The Thunderer" – United States Marine Band
- "The Washington Post" – United States Marine Band
- "The Whistling Coon" – George W. Johnson

== Classical music ==
- Ferruccio Busoni – Violin Sonata No. 1, Opus 29
- Ernest Chausson – Chansons de Shakespeare
- Antonín Dvořák –
  - Requiem
  - Symphony No. 8
- Edward Elgar – Froissart
- Alexander Glazunov – Symphony No. 3, Opus 33
- Armas Järnefelt – Ouverture Lyrique
- Carl Nielsen – String Quartet No. 2 in F minor
- Hans Pfitzner – Sonata in F-sharp minor for cello and piano
- Alexander Scriabin – Romance for Horn and Piano
- Jean Sibelius – Piano Quintet in G minor
- Johann Strauss II – Rathausball-Tänze
- Sergei Taneyev – String Quartet No. 1 Opus 4
- William Robert Knox – Gladys Gavotte

== Opera ==
- Cavalleria Rusticana by Pietro Mascagni
- Prince Igor begun by Alexander Borodin, completed by Alexander Glazunov and Nikolai Rimsky-Korsakov
- Queen of Spades by Pyotr Ilyich Tchaikovsky
- Thorgrim by Frederic H. Cowen with libretto by Joseph Bennett

== Musical theater ==
- The Gondoliers Broadway production
- Love And Law Broadway production
- Robin Hood Chicago production
- The Sentry London production
- Reilly And The 400 Broadway production

== Births ==
- February 25 – Myra Hess, pianist (d. 1965)
- February 27 – Freddie Keppard, jazz cornetist (d. 1933)
- March 12 – Evert Taube, writer, artist, composer and singer (d. 1976)
- March 17 – Harold Morris, pianist and composer (d. 1964)
- March 20
  - Beniamino Gigli, operatic tenor (d. 1957)
  - Lauritz Melchior, operatic tenor (d. 1973)
- March 28 – Paul Whiteman, bandleader (d. 1967)
- April 17 – Gussie Mueller, jazz clarinetist (d. 1965)
- May 21 – Harry Tierney, songwriter, composer of "Irene" and "Rio Rita" (d. 1965)
- June 6 – Ted Lewis, bandleader (d. 1971)
- June 26 – Jeanne Eagels, Broadway star (d. 1929)
- July 18 – Victor Dolidze, Soviet-Georgian composer (d. 1933)
- August 12 – Lillian Evanti, operatic soprano (d. 1967)
- August 15 – Jacques Ibert, composer (d. 1962)
- August 28 – Ivor Gurney, poet and composer (d. 1937)
- September 9 – Francis Bousquet, French composer of classical music (d. 1942)
- September 15 – Frank Martin, composer (d. 1974)
- September 26 – Papanasam Sivan, Carnatic music composer (d. 1973)
- October 1 – Stanley Holloway, English actor and singer (d. 1982)
- October 8 – Samuel Hoffenstein, screenwriter and composer (d. 1947)
- October 13 – Gösta Nystroem, composer (d. 1966)
- October 20 – Jelly Roll Morton, American pianist, bandleader and composer (d. 1941)
- November 10 – Mischa Bakaleinikoff, musical director (d. 1960)
- December 8 – Bohuslav Martinů, classical composer (d. 1959)

== Deaths ==
- January 8 – Giorgio Ronconi, operatic baritone (b. 1810)
- January 16 – Arthur Byron, operatic tenor (b. 1846)
- January 17 – Salomon Sulzer, cantor and composer (b. 1804)
- January 20 – Franz Lachner, conductor and composer (b. 1803)
- February 14 – Wilhelm Fitzenhagen, cellist and music teacher (b. 1848)
- March 13 – Henry Wylde, conductor, composer, music teacher and critic (b. 1822)
- April 16 – John Barnett, composer and music writer (b. 1802)
- May 6 – Hubert Léonard, violinist (b. 1819)
- May 28 – Viktor Nessler, composer (b. 1841)
- June 3 – Oskar Kolberg, folklorist and composer (b. 1814)
- June 30 – Samuel Parkman Tuckerman, composer (b. 1819)
- July 22 – Caterina Canzi, opera singer (b. 1805)
- October 7 – John Hill Hewitt, songwriter (b. 1801)
- October 17 – Prosper Sainton, violinist (b. 1813)
- October 28 – Alexander John Ellis, music theorist (b. 1814)
- November 8 – César Franck, composer (b. 1822)
- December 21 – Niels Gade, composer (b. 1817)
- date unknown – Ostap Veresai, minstrel and kobzar (b. 1803)
