= 1857 in music =

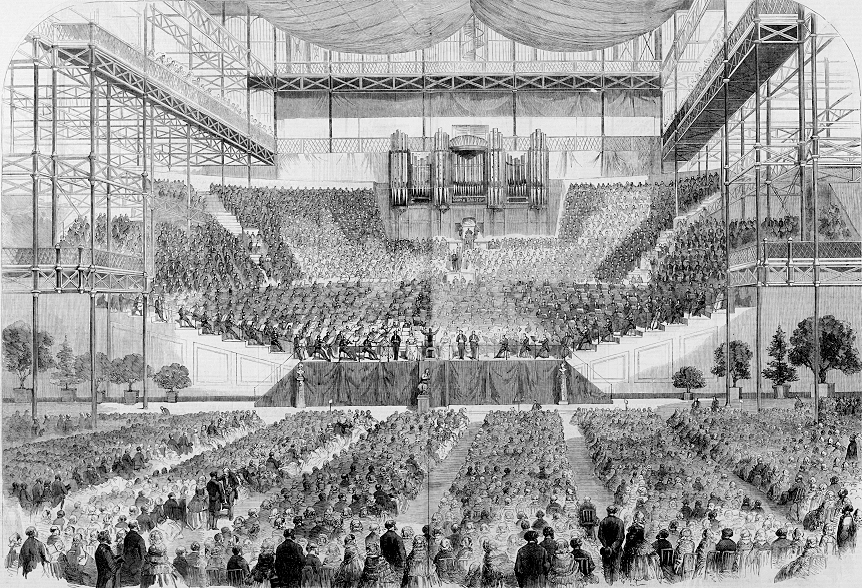
Interior of the Crystal Palace, London, for a music festival in 1857.

== Events ==
- January 7 – Franz Liszt's Piano Concerto No. 2 receives its first public performance. Hans von Bronsart is the pianist with Liszt conducting, in Weimar.
- January 21 – Giacomo Meyerbeer conducts a work by Mikhail Glinka, at a concert in Berlin attended by the composer. Glinka catches a cold and dies a few weeks later, aged 52; autopsy results are inconclusive.
- January 27 – Franz Liszt's Sonata in B minor (Liszt) is given its first public performance by Hans von Bülow in Berlin.
- February 7 – Louis Gottschalk leaves New York to begin a concert tour of Cuba.
- March 14 – Stephen Foster sells all his copyrights to his music publisher for $1,872.28.
- April 28 – Richard Wagner moves into Green Hill at Zürich, a villa owned by Otto Wesendonck.
- July 4 – Georges Bizet wins the Prix de Rome.
- August 27 – Joseph Joachim writes to Franz Liszt, ending their professional relationship.
- October 8 – Irish opera diva Catherine Hayes marries her manager, William Avery Bushnell, in San Francisco; he dies less than a year later.
- November 12 – 73-year-old Louis Spohr is forced into retirement from his post at the Hesse-Kassel court.
- Gioacchino Rossini begins Péchés de vieillesse.
- Hans von Bülow marries Cosima Liszt daughter of Franz Liszt. They had two daughters.

== Published popular music ==
- "Le beau Monde (Fashionable Society)" m. Johann Strauss II
- "Does He Love Me?" w. Annie Chambers Bradford m. F. W. Smith
- "Jingle Bells w.m. James Pierpont originally published as "One Horse Open Sleigh"
- "Lorena" w. Reverend Henry D. L. Webster m. Joseph Philbrick Webster
- "Annie Lisle" w.m. H. S. Thompson

== Classical music ==
- Charles-Valentin Alkan
  - Sonate de Concert in E, Op. 47 for cello and piano
  - Douze études dans tous les tons mineurs for piano
- Woldemar Bargiel – Ouvertüre zu einem Trauerspiel, Op.18
- Georges Bizet – Herminie (cantata)
- Adolphe Blanc
  - String Quintet No.3, Op.21
  - String Quintet No.4, Op.22
  - Trio in B♭ major for piano, violin (or clarinet) and cello, Op.23
- Johannes Brahms - Eleven Variations on an Original Theme, in D major Opus 21 No.1
- Hans von Bülow – 5 Lieder, Op.5
- Louise Farrenc – Trio no.4 for Flute, Cello, and Piano, Op.45
- Wilhelm Kalliwoda – Scherzo, Op.4
- Franz Liszt
  - Dante Symphony
  - Hunnenschlacht (premiered on 29 December)
  - Die Ideale (premiered on 5 September)
- Giacomo Meyerbeer – Près de toi
- Modest Mussorgsky – Souvenir d'Enfance
- Joachim Raff
  - Ode to Spring: Concert Piece in G major, Op. 76, for piano and orchestra
  - String Quartet No. 2 in A major; Op. 90
- Napoléon Henri Reber – Symphony No.4, Op.33
- Julius Reubke – The 94th Psalm
- Camille Saint-Saëns - Tarantelle in A minor for Flute, Clarinet and Orchestra
- Bedřich Smetana – Piano Trio in G minor, Op. 15 (revised version – original finished 1855)
- Johann Strauss Jr.
  - Strelna-Terrassen-Quadrille, Op.185
  - La Berceuse Quadrille, Op.194

== Opera ==
- François Bazin – Maître Pathelin
- Karel Miry – Karel V (opera in 5 acts, libretto by Hippoliet van Peene, premiered on January 29 in Ghent)
- Jacques Offenbach – Croquefer, premiered February 12 in Paris
- Ambroise Thomas – Le Carnaval de Venise
- Giuseppe Verdi
  - Simon Boccanegra, premiered March 12 in Venice
  - Aroldo, premiered August 16 in Rimini

== Births ==
- January 5 – David Bispham, opera singer (died 1921)
- January 17 – Wilhelm Kienzl, Austrian composer (died 1941)
- January 22 – Marie Krysińska, musician and composer (died 1908)
- February 28 – Gustave Kerker, German-born composer (died 1923)
- March 3 – Alfred Bruneau, French composer (died 1934)
- March 4
  - Gustav Kobbé, American music critic and author (died 1918)
  - Henry W. Petrie, American songwriter (died 1925)
- March 15 – Berta Bock, Romanian composer (died 1945)
- April 21 – Paul Dresser, American composer (died 1906)
- April 23 – Ruggiero Leoncavallo, Italian opera composer (died 1919)
- April 29 – František Ondříček, Czech violinist and composer (died 1922)
- May 2 – Frederic Cliffe, English composer (died 1931)
- May 9 – Luigi Illica, Italian librettist for Puccini, Catalani, Giordano and others (died 1919)
- May 12 – Lillian Nordica, American opera singer (died 1914)
- June 2 – Edward Elgar, English composer (died 1934)
- June 5 – Árpád Doppler, Hungarian-German composer (died 1927)
- June 12 – Achille Simonetti, violinist (died 1928)
- July 8 – Rudolf Dellinger, composer (died 1910)
- July 16 – Bolesław Domaniewski, pianist (died 1925)
- August 8 – Cécile Chaminade, French composer (died 1944)
- August 18 – Eusebius Mandyczewski, publisher and musician (died 1929)
- September 8 – Olga Björkegren, Swedish opera singer (died 1950)
- October 12 – Paul Lange, German musician, teacher, orchestra and choir leader (died 1919)
- October 17 – Frank T. Southwick, American composer and organist (died 1948)
- November 5 – Joseph Tabrar, English music hall songwriter (d. 1931)
- November 12 – Genevra Johnstone-Bishop, American soprano and voice teacher (died 1923)
- November 14 – Rosalind Ellicott, English composer (died 1924)
- December 14 – Frederic Lillebridge, pianist (died 1934)
- December 18 – Rosa Newmarch, née Jeaffreson, English musicologist (died 1940)
- December 27 – Charles Manners, né Southcote Mansergh, English operatic bass and opera company manager (died 1935)
- December 30 – Sylvio Lazzari, Italian composer and conductor (died 1944)
- date unknown – Thomas Adams, organist (died 1918)

== Deaths ==
- January 19 – Franz Limmer, conductor and composer (b. 1808)
- February 3 – Johann Gottlieb Kotte, musician (born 1797)
- February 14 – Johannes Bernardus van Bree, violinist, conductor and composer (born 1801)
- February 15 – Mikhail Glinka, composer (b. 1804)
- March 1 – Benjamin Cross, organist, singer, conductor and composer (b. 1786)
- April – Alessandro Curmi, pianist and composer (b. 1801)
- June 28 – Joseph Fischhof, pianist, composer and music teacher (born 1804)
- July 3 – Anton Schmid, music historian, librarian, and musician (born 1787)
- July 15 – Carl Czerny, pianist and composer (b. 1791)
- July 16 – Pierre-Jean de Béranger, songwriter (b. 1780)
- August 1 – Emilie Zumsteeg, pianist and songwriter (b. 1796)
- September 18 – Karol Kurpiński, composer (born 1785)
- October 20 – John Diamond, dancer (born 1823)
- October 21 – Ananias Davisson, singing teacher and printer of shape note books (b. 1780)
- November 7 – Charles Zeuner, organist (born 1795)
- December 11 – Castil-Blaze, music critic, musicologist and composer (b. 1784)
- probable – Ferdinand Prévôt, operatic baritone (born c.1800)
