= 1865 in music =

This article is about music-related events in 1865.

== Events ==
- January 1 – Hector Berlioz completes his Memoirs.
- April 20 – Crosby's Opera House (Chicago, Illinois) opens
- April 28 – Giacomo Meyerbeer's opera L'Africaine is premiered in Paris at the Grand Opéra, after the composer's death.
- June 10 – Richard Wagner's opera Tristan und Isolde debuts in Munich at the Königliches Hof- und Nationaltheater.
- September 9 – Franz von Suppé's operetta Die schöne Galathee debuts in Vienna's Carl-Theater.
- September 11 – Johann Strauss II conducts a performance of 'Characteristic Dances' by Peter Tchaikovsky at Pavlovsk Park. It is the first public performance of Tchaikovsky's music. The piece would later become the 'Dances of the Hay Maidens', in The Voyevoda.
- December 17 – Franz Schubert's Unfinished Symphony debuts in Vienna, 43 years after of its composition.
- Philipp Scharwenka relocates to Berlin.
- Joseph Parry is admitted to the Gorsedd of bards at the National Eisteddfod of Wales.

== Published popular songs ==
- "Follow the Flag" m. John Rogers Thomas
- "Jeff in Pettycoats" by Henry Tucker
- "Marching Through Georgia" w.m. Henry Clay Work
- "Roll, Jordan, Roll" traditional spiritual
- "The Ship That Never Returned" w.m. Henry Clay Work

== Classical music ==
- Elfrida Andrée – Piano Quintet in E minor
- Antonio Bazzini – String Quartet in F major
- Johannes Brahms
  - Piano Quintet, Op.34
  - String Sextet No. 2 Op. 36
  - Cello Sonata No. 1 Op. 38
  - Sixteen Waltzes, Op. 39
  - Trio for violin, horn and piano Op. 40
- Anton Bruckner
  - Military March in E-flat major, WAB 116
  - Trauungschor ("Wedding chorus")
- Hans von Bulow – 3 Valses caractéristiques, Op.18
- Felix Draeseke – Lacrimosa
- Antonín Dvořák
  - Cello concerto No. 1 in A major (later reconstructed by Günter Raphael,
  - Symphony No. 1 (The Bells of Zlonice) (Note: in a version published ca. 1929; see OCLC 9637942.) and later (Note: in a version published in 1977 – see OCLC 13531595) by Jarmil Burghauser)
  - Symphony No. 2
- Gabriel Fauré – Cantique de Jean Racine
- César Franck – Quare fremuerunt gentes
- Herman Goetz – Sonata for Piano (Four Hands), Op.17
- Carl Goldmark – Sakuntala, Op.13
- Edvard Grieg
  - Piano sonata Op. 7 in E minor
  - Violin sonata No. 1 Op. 8
- Franz Liszt – Missa Choralis
- Jules Massenet – Suite No.1, Op.13
- Modest Mussorgsky
  - Prayer, Op.5
  - Cradle Song, Op.16
  - Memories of Childhood
- Nikolai Rimsky-Korsakov – Symphony No. 1
- Camille Saint-Saëns – Serenade in E flat major, Op. 15
- Pablo de Sarasate – Souvenirs de Faust
- Johan Svendsen
  - String Quartet, Op. 1
  - 2 Songs (Male Chorus), Op. 2
- Pyotr Ilyich Tchaikovsky
  - Overture in F major
  - Piano Sonata in C-sharp minor
  - Quartet Movement in B-flat major
- Henri Wieniawski – Fantasia on Themes from 'Faust', Op.20

== Opera ==
- François Bazin – Le voyage en Chine
- Giacomo Meyerbeer – L'Africaine
- Stanislaw Moniuszko – The Haunted Manor
- Camille Saint-Saëns – Le timbre d'argent
- Richard Wagner – Tristan und Isolde

== Musical theater ==
- Die schöne Galathée
- Orpheus In The Underworld, London production opened at Her Majesty's Theatre on December 26 and ran for 76 performances

== Births ==
- January 7 – Olga Islar, German soprano (d. 1944)
- February 18 – Marie Jahn, Austrian soprano (d. 1934)
- May 9 – August de Boeck, Belgium Composer (d. 1937)
- June 9
  - Carl Nielsen, composer (d. 1931)
  - Albéric Magnard, composer (d. 1914)
- June 13 – William Butler Yeats, lyricist (died 1939)
- June 14 – Auguste Sérieyx, composer (died 1949)
- July 8 – Rita Strohl, composer (died 1941)
- July 21 – Robert Kahn, composer (d. 1951)
- August 10 – Alexander Glazunov, composer (d. 1936)
- October 1 – Paul Dukas, composer (d. 1935)
- October 13 – Jón Laxdal, Icelandic composer (d. 1928)
- October 15 – Charles W. Clark, American baritone (d. 1925)
- November 2 – Marie Goetze, German contralto (d. 1922)
- December 3 – Gustav Jenner, composer (d. 1920)
- December 8 – Jean Sibelius, composer (d. 1957)
- December 25 – Fay Templeton, US singer and actress

== Deaths ==
- January 23 – Josef Leopold Zvonař, composer and music critic (b. 1824)
- January 27 – Giuseppe Rocca, violin maker (b. 1807)
- January 28 – Felice Romani, librettist for Donizetti and Bellini (b. 1788)
- February 20 – Pierre-Louis Dietsch, French composer and conductor (b. 1808)
- April 1 – Giuditta Pasta, operatic soprano (b. 1797)
- April 2 – John Cassell, music publisher (born 1817)
- August 1 – François Xavier Bazin, bow-maker (b. 1824) (cholera)
- September 10 – George Linley, poet and composer (b. 1798)
- October 8 – Heinrich Wilhelm Ernst, violinist and composer (b. 1814)
- October 12 – William Vincent Wallace, composer (b. 1812)
- December 6 – Sebastián Iradier, composer (b. 1809)
- December 18 – Francisco Manuel da Silva, songwriter and music professor (b. 1795)
