= 1878 in music =

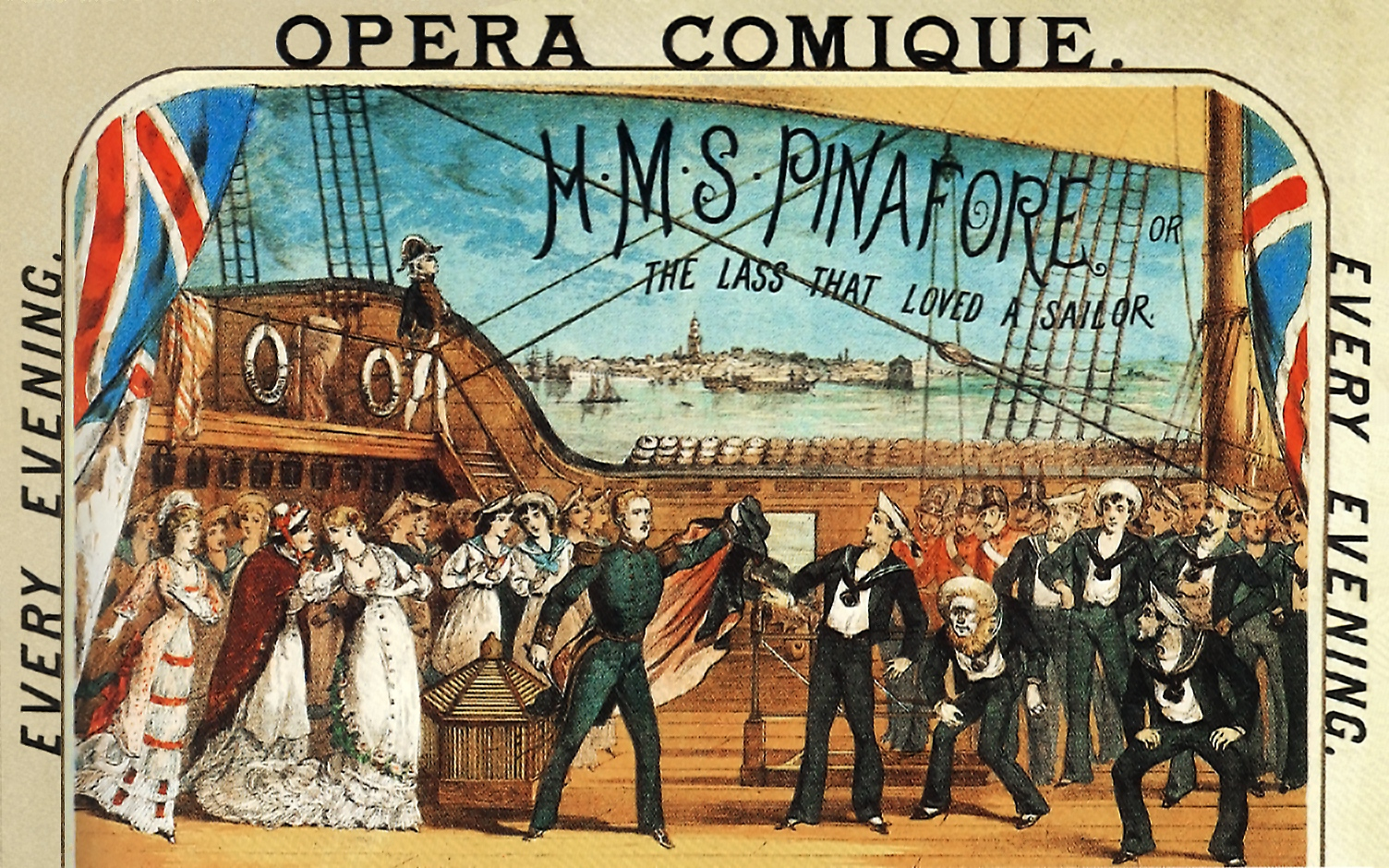
An illustration of a scene from H.M.S. Pinafore from the original theatre poster and playbill created for the original production in 1878 at the Opera Comique in London.

This article is about music-related events in 1878.

== Events ==
- April 9? – Franz Berwald's Symphony No. 4 receives its premiere performance, conducted by Ludvig Norman.
- May 25 – Gilbert and Sullivan's comic opera H.M.S. Pinafore debuts in London at the Opera Comique with a first run of 571 performances.
- November 18 – Soprano Marie Selika Williams becomes the first African American artist to perform at the White House.
- A Dictionary of Music and Musicians edited by George Grove begins publication in the U.K.

== Published popular music ==
- "Aloha ʻOe" w.m. Queen Liliuokalani of Hawaii
- "Carry Me Back To Old Virginny" w.m. James A. Bland
- "De Gospel Raft" by Frank Dumont
- "Emmet's Lullaby" Joseph K. Emmet
- From H.M.S. Pinafore: (words by W. S. Gilbert, music by Arthur Sullivan)
  - "I Am the Captain of the Pinafore"
  - "I Am the Ruler of the Queen's Navee"
  - "I'm Called Little Buttercup"
  - "Kind Captain"
  - "Never Mind the Why and Wherefore"
  - "When I Was a Lad"
- "In The Evening By the Moonlight" w.m. James A. Bland
- "Keep In De Middle Ob De Road" w.m. Will Hays
- "Ten Little Injuns" w. & m. Septimus Winner
- "When the birds have gone to sleep," words by Arthur W. French, music by William A. Huntley
- "The Whistling Coon" an American coon song written in 1878 by the minstrel performer Sam Devere, which became an early hit recording by George W. Johnson, an early African American recording star.

== Classical music ==
- Johannes Brahms
  - Motets Op. 74
  - Eight Pieces (for piano) Op. 76
  - Violin Concerto in D major, Op. 77
- Anton Bruckner
  - Symphony No. 4 – 2nd version
  - Symphony No. 5
- Ferruccio Busoni – Piano Concerto in D, op. 17, for piano and string orchestra
- George Whitefield Chadwick – String Quartet No. 1
- Felix Otto Dessoff – String Quartet in F, Op. 7
- Antonín Dvořák
  - Serenade for Wind Instruments (Dvořák) (op. 44/B. 77)
  - Three Slavonic Rhapsodies (op. 45/B. 86)
  - Slavonic Dances, Set 1 (op. 46/B. 83)
  - Bagatelles, Op.47
  - String Sextet (Dvořák), (op. 48/B. 80)
- Gabriel Fauré – Chanson Après un rêve (Op. 7 No. 1)
- Zdeněk Fibich
  - String Quartet No.2, Op.8
  - Věčnost (Eternity), Concert Melodrama for Narrator and Piano, Op.14
- Niels Gade – Capriccio for violin and orchestra in A minor
- Edvard Grieg
  - String Quartet No. 1 in G minor, Op. 27
  - Improvisations on 2 Norwegian Folk Songs, Op.29
  - Albumblad, EG 109
- Hans Huber – Piano Concerto No. 1 in C minor, Op. 36
- Vincent d'Indy – La forêt enchantée
- Joseph Joachim – Elegiac Overture 'In Memoriam Heinrich von Kleist', Op.13
- Cyrill Kistler – 4 Lieder, Op.20 (including "Am Waldessaume")
- Édouard Lalo
  - Cello Concerto in D minor
  - Fantaisie norvégienne
- Giuseppe Martucci
  - Piano Concerto No. 1 in D minor
  - Piano Quintet in C major, Op. 45
- Siegfried Ochs – 'S kommt ein Vogel geflogen
- Ole Olsen – Asgårdsreien, Op. 10 (symphonic poems)
- Robert Radecke – Symphony in F major, Op. 50
- Joachim Raff
  - Aus Thüringen, WoO. 45
  - Symphony No. 9 Im Sommer, Op. 208
- Josef Rheinberger
  - Cantus Missae, Mass in E-flat major for double choir, Op. 109
  - Ouvertüre zu Schiller's Demetrius, Op. 110
  - Organ Sonata No. 5 in F-sharp minor, Op. 111
  - Piano Trio No. 2 in A major, Op. 112
  - Piano Quintet, Op. 114
- Nicolai Rimsky-Korsakov – 6 Variations on the Theme B-A-C-H, Op.10
- Pablo de Sarasate – Spanish Dances for violin and piano, Book I
- Bernhard Scholz – String Quintet Op. 47
- Richard Strauss – Alphorn, TrV 64
- Sergei Taneyev – Symphony no 2 in B flat minor
- Pyotr Ilyich Tchaikovsky
  - Symphony No. 4 in F minor, op. 36
  - Violin Concerto in D major
  - Piano Sonata in G major, Op. 37.
  - 6 Romances, Op.38
- Anton Urspruch – Variationen über ein eigenes Thema, Op.10

== Opera ==
- Alfred Cellier – After All!
- Charles Gounod – Polyeucte (opera)
- Charles Edouard Lefebvre – Lucrèce
- Miguel Marqués – El anillo de hierro (libretto by Marcos Zapata, premiered in Madrid)
- Joseph Parry – Blodwen
- Emile Pessard
  - Le char premiered on January 18 at the Théâtre de l'Opéra-Comique, Paris
  - Le Capitaine Fracasse premiered on July 2 at the Théâtre Lyrique, Paris
- Joachim Raff – Benedetto Marcello

== Musical theater ==
- Gilbert and Sullivan – H.M.S. Pinafore, London production
- Jacques Offenbach – Madame Favart, Paris production

== Births ==
- January 4 – Rosa Grünberg, Swedish actress and soprano (d. 1960)
- January 6 – Carl Sandburg, American poet and lyricist (died 1967)
- January 22 – Ben Deeley, American actor and lyricist (died 1924)
- January 23 – Rutland Boughton, English composer (d. 1960)
- January 26 – Rudolf Alexander Schröder, lyricist (died 1962)
- January 28 – Walter Kollo, Singspiele composer (died 1940)
- February 16 – Selim Palmgren, Finnish composer (d. 1951)
- February 26 – Emmy Destinn, Czech soprano (d. 1930)
- February 28 – Artur Kapp, Estonian composer (d. 1952)
- March 4 – Egbert Van Alstyne, American songwriter (d. 1951)
- March 23 – Franz Schreker, Austrian composer, conductor and teacher (d. 1934)
- March 29 – Albert Von Tilzer, American songwriter (d. 1956)
- May 24 – Louis Fleury, French flautist (d. 1926)
- May 25 – Bill Robinson, American tap dancer, singer, actor (d. 1949)
- July 3 – George M. Cohan, American songwriter, entertainer (d. 1942)
- July 5 – Joseph Holbrooke, English composer (d. 1958)
- July 9 – Eduard Sõrmus, Estonian violinist (d. 1940)
- July 12
  - Bert Grant, composer (died 1951)
  - Percy Hilder Miles, English composer, violinist and teacher (d. 1922)
- July 22 – Ernest Ball, American singer-songwriter (d. 1927)
- July 25 – Heinrich Gebhard, German-born composer (d. 1963)
- August 18 – Fritz Brun, Swiss composer and conductor (d. 1959)
- August 22 – Edward Johnson, Canadian operatic tenor (d. 1959)
- August 28 – Laura de Turczynowicz (née Laura Christine Blackwell), Canadian-born opera singer (d. 1953)
- September 7 – Adolphe Piriou, French composer and musician (died 1964)
- September 17 – Vincenzo Tommasini, Italian composer (d. 1950)
- October 18 – Blind Uncle Gaspard, American Cajun vocalist and guitarist (d. 1937)
- October 19
  - Hermann Claudius, lyricist (died 1980)
  - Alphonse Picou, American jazz clarinettist (d. 1961)
- November 4 – Jean Schwartz, Hungarian-born songwriter (d. 1956)
- November 23 – André Caplet, French composer and conductor (d. 1925)
- December 23 – Wilfred Sanderson, composer (died 1935)
- Undated – Ustad Qasim, Afghan musician (d. 1957)

== Deaths ==
- January 15 – Carlo Blasis, dancer and choreographer (b. 1797)
- February 2 – Josif Runjanin, composer (b. 1821)
- April 8 – Henriette "Jetty" Treffz, singer, first wife and business manager of Johann Strauss II (b. 1818)
- April 21 – Temistocle Solera, librettist and composer (b. 1815)
- May 6 – François Benoist, organist and composer (b. 1794)
- May 24 – Franz Espagne, musicologist (born 1828)
- July 2 – François Bazin, opera composer (b. 1816)
- August 23 – Adolf Fredrik Lindblad, composer (b. 1801)
- October 13-October 25 – Ludwig Wilhelm Maurer, violinist, conductor and composer (b. 1789)
- November – Marco Aurelio Zani de Ferranti, guitarist and composer (b. 1801)
- November 13 – Carl Heissler, violinist (b. 1826)
- December 18 – Heinrich Proch, composer (b. 1809)
- December 28 – José Bernardo Alcedo, composer of the Peruvian national anthem (b. 1788)
- date unknown – Robert Heller, pianist and magician (b. 1826)
