= 1867 in music =

This article is about music-related events in 1867.

== Events ==
"The Blue Danube"
A mid-20th century US rendition of Johann Strauss II's waltz "The Blue Danube", which was composed in 1866 and performed publicly for the first time in February 1867.

- January 2 – The Royal Danish Academy of Music opens in Copenhagen under the direction of Niels Gade.
- February 15 – First performance of Johann Strauss II's waltz "The Blue Danube" (An der schönen blauen Donau, composed 1866) at a concert of the Vienna Men's Choral Association (Wiener Männergesang-Verein). Strauss adapts it into its popular purely orchestral version for the International Exposition in Paris later this year.
- April 4 Introduction and Rondo Capriccioso by Saint-Saens is given its first performance at the Champs-Élysées, with Pablo de Sarasate playing the solo part and the composer conducting.
- April 22 – The Hyers Sisters make their professional debut at Sacramento's Metropolitan Theater.
- April 27 – Charles Gounod's opera Roméo et Juliette premiers in Théâtre Lyrique, Paris
- May 11 – The first comic opera with a score by Arthur Sullivan to be publicly performed, the one-act Cox and Box with libretto by F. C. Burnand, opens at the Adelphi Theatre in London and runs for 300 performances. It is followed by the two-act The Contrabandista, or The Law of the Ladrones by the same partnership which opens on December 18 at St. George's Hall, London.
- June 11 – Soprano Nina Grieg marries her cousin, composer Edvard Grieg, in Copenhagen.
- September – Premiere of the opera O ypopsifios (The Parliamentary Candidate) (music: Spyridon Xyndas, libretto: Ioannis Rinopoulos), the first full-scale opera in Greek.
- October - Richard Wagner completes Die Meistersinger von Nürnberg.
- December 1 – Johann von Herbeck conducts the first three movements of Brahms' A German Requiem in Vienna.
- Copyright restrictions in the new North German Confederation are lifted for composers dead for more than 30 years, leading to the introduction of popular editions of scores by Leipzig publishers Breitkopf & Härtel and Edition Peters.
- "The Maple Leaf Forever" is written in Canada by Alexander Muir.

== Published popular music ==
- "The Blue Danube" (waltz) m. Johann Strauss II w. Joseph Weyl
- "Champagne Charlie" by Alfred Lee & H. J. Whymark
- "Croquet" w. C.H. Webb m. John Rogers Thomas
- "Johnny I Hardly Knew Ye" by Joseph B. Geoghegan
- "The Lambton Worm" by Clarence M. Leumane
- "The Man on the Flying Trapeze" by George Leybourne, Gaston Lyle & Alfred Lee
- "Not For Joseph" w.m. Arthur Lloyd
- "The Moon Is Out To Night, Love" w.m. Will S. Hays
- "Waiting" w. Ellen H. Flagg m. Harrison Millard

== Classical music ==
- Sir William Sterndale Bennett – The Woman of Samaria (cantata)
- Felix Draeseke
  - Zwei Konzertwalzer, Op, 4: No. 1 in E-flat; No. 2 in D-flat
  - Ballade for Cello and Piano in B
- Henri Duparc – Sonata for Cello and Piano
- Hermann Goetz – Concerto for Piano no 2 in B-flat major
- Edvard Grieg – Book 1 (Op. 12) of the Lyric Pieces for piano.
- Modest Mussorgsky – Night on Bald Mountain
- Joachim Raff
  - String Quartet No. 4 in A minor, Op. 137
  - String Quartet No. 5 in G major, Op. 138
  - Festival March, Op. 139, for orchestra
- Nikolai Rimsky-Korsakov – Sadko
- Johann Strauss II - The Blue Danube
- Pyotr Ilyich Tchaikovsky
  - Souvenir de Hapsal, suite of three pieces for piano.
  - Scherzo à la russe, first of Two Pieces for Piano, Op. 1.
- Franz Liszt – Marche funèbre, En mémoire de Maximilian I, Empereur du Mexique

== Opera ==
- Georges Bizet – La jolie fille de Perth (26 December 26, Théâtre Lyrique, Paris)
- Charles Gounod – Roméo et Juliette (27 April, Théâtre Lyrique, Paris)
- Jacques Offenbach – La Grande-Duchesse de Gérolstein (12 April, Théâtre des Variétés, Paris)
- Giuseppe Verdi – Don Carlos (11 March, Paris Opéra's Salle Le Peletier)
- Édouard Lalo – Fiesque
- Jules Massenet – La Grand'Tante
- Karel Miry
  - Frans Ackermann (opera in 4 acts, libretto by N. Destanberg, premièred on October 13, in Brussels)
  - Brutus en Cesar (opera in 1 act, libretto by P. Geiregat, premièred on October 14, in Ghent)
  - Le Mariage de Marguerite (opera in 1 act, libretto by M. de Wille, premièred on November 27, in Ghent)

== Musical theater ==
- Arthur Sullivan (libretti by F. C. Burnand)
  - The Contrabandista
  - Cox and Box

== Births ==
- January 28 – Eugène Goossens, fils, violinist and conductor (d. 1958)
- March 24
  - Guido Menasci, librettist (d. 1925)
  - Martinus Sieveking, pianist and composer (d. 1950)
- March 25 – Arturo Toscanini, noted conductor (d. 1957)
- May 6 – Nora Clench, violinist (d. 1938)
- June 3 – Béla Szabados, composer (d. 1936)
- June 27 – Ewald Straesser, composer (d. 1933)
- July 10 – Jules Mouquet, composer (d. 1946)
- July 27 – Enrique Granados, composer (d. 1916)
- August 28 – Umberto Giordano, opera composer (d. 1948)
- September 5 – Amy Beach, composer (d. 1944)
- September 7 – Evan Williams, operatic tenor (d. 1918)
- October 12 – Herbert L. Clarke, cornet virtuoso and composer (d. 1945)
- November 24 – Scott Joplin, ragtime composer (d. 1917)
- November 27
  - Charles Koechlin, composer, teacher and writer on music (d. 1950)
  - Margaret Ruthven Lang, composer (d. 1972)
- December 27 – Henri Christiné, composer (d. 1941)

== Deaths ==
- February 23 – Sir George Thomas Smart, multi-instrumentalist and conductor (b. 1776)
- March 16 – Benjamin Hanby, songwriter (b. 1833)
- March 24 – Alfred Mellon, violinist, conductor and composer (b. 1820)
- May 3 – Fanny Tacchinardi Persiani, operatic soprano (b. 1812)
- May 6 – Johann Caspar Aiblinger, composer (b. 1779)
- September 7 – Henriette Méric-Lalande, operatic soprano (b. 1798)
- September 10 – Simon Sechter, organist, conductor and composer (b. 1788)
- September 27 – Louis Desiré Veron, opera manager (b. 1798)
- October 3 – Hedda Hjortsberg, ballerina (b. 1777)
- October 5 – Thomas Täglichsbeck, violinist and composer (b. 1799)
- October 9 – Ignacy Feliks Dobrzyński, pianist and composer (b. 1807)
- December 2 – Nadezhda Repina, singer and actress (b. 1809)
- December 6 – Giovanni Pacini, composer (b. 1796)
- date unknown – Charles Frederick Hempel, organist and composer (b. 1811)
