= 1875 in music =

This article is about music-related events in 1875.

== Events ==
- January 5 – Palais Garnier, home of the Paris Opera, designed by Charles Garnier, opens.
- January 24 - Camille Saint-Saëns' orchestral Danse Macabre receives its première.
- March 3 – Georges Bizet's opera Carmen debuts, at the Opéra-Comique in Paris.
- May – The score for the ballet Swan Lake is commissioned from Tchaikovsky (premiered in 1877).
- May 6 – Richard Wagner conducts portions of Götterdämmerung in concert in Vienna (the complete opera is premiered in 1876).
- August 23 – Composer Zdeněk Fibich marries operatic contralto Betty Hanušová, sister of his first wife Růžena Hanušová.
- October 25 – The first performance of Tchaikovsky's Piano Concerto No. 1 is given in Boston, Massachusetts, with Hans von Bülow as soloist.
- Robert Volkmann becomes professor of harmony and counterpoint at the National Academy of Music in Budapest, under Franz Liszt.
- T. B. Harms is established as a pioneering popular music publisher in New York City.

== Published popular music ==
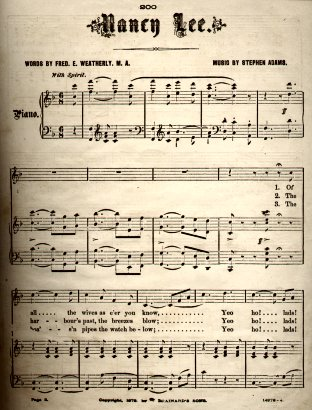
- "All the Way My Savior Leads Me" w. Fanny Crosby m. Robert Lowry
- "Angels, Meet Me At the Cross Road" w.m. Will Hays
- "Carve Dat Possum" by Sam Lucas & Herbert Hershy
- "Draw Me Nearer" w. Fanny Crosby m. William H. Doane
- "Dreaming Forever of Thee" w.m. John Hill Hewitt
- "I'll Take You Home Again, Kathleen" w.m. Thomas P. Westendorf
- "Myfanwy" w.m. Joseph Parry
- "Nancy Lee" w. Frederic Edward Weatherly, m. Stephen Adams (pseudonym of Michael Maybrick)
- "The Spelling Bee" w.m. Septimus Winner
- "Take me back to home and mother," w. by Arthur W. French, m. by William A. Huntley
- "To God Be the Glory" w. Fanny Crosby m. William H. Doane
- "A Warrior Bold" w. Edwin Thomas m. Stephen Adams (pseudonym of Michael Maybrick)
- "The Witches Flight (Galop Caprice)" by Henry M. Russell

== Classical music ==
- Johannes Brahms
  - Fifteen Liebeslieder for piano duet
  - String Quartet No. 3
- Antonín Dvořák
  - Moravian duets (for voices and piano)
  - Piano Quartet No. 1
  - Piano Trio No. 1
  - Serenade for Strings
  - String Quintet (with double bass) (orig Op. 18)
  - Symphony No. 5
- Gabriel Fauré
  - Allegro Symphonique (for orchestra)
  - Suite for Orchestra
  - Les Djinns (for chorus and orchestra)
- Edvard Grieg – incidental music to Ibsen's Peer Gynt
- Édouard Lalo – Allegro Symphonique
- Alexandre Luigini – Ballet égyptien
- Jules Massenet – oratorio Eve
- Modest Mussorgsky – Pesni i plyaski smerti (Songs and Dances of Death), song cycle for bass voice and piano
- Amilcare Ponchielli – cantata A Gaetano Donizetti
- Nikolai Rimsky-Korsakov – String Quartet No. 1 in F Major, Op.12
- Camille Saint-Saëns
  - Piano Quartet, Op. 41
  - Piano Concerto No. 4, Op. 44
- Bedřich Smetana – Má vlast (My Country) – Six symphonic poems
- Tchaikovsky
  - Piano Concerto No. 1
  - Symphony No. 3
  - Swan Lake (ballet, composition begun)

== Opera ==
- Carmen first performed in Paris. Music by Georges Bizet and libretto by Henri Meilhac and Ludovic Halévy.
- Die Königin von Saba, music by Karl Goldmark and libretto by Salomon Mosenthal (at the Hofoper (now the State Opera) in Vienna, on 10 March 1875)
- Angelo, music by César Cui

== Musical theater ==
- Gilbert & Sullivan – Trial By Jury
  - London production opens at the Royalty Theatre on March 25
  - Philadelphia production opens at the Arch Street Theatre on October 22
- The Zoo, Lyrics and Book: Bolton Rowe Music: Arthur Sullivan, London production opened at St. James Theatre on June 5

== Births ==
- February 2 – Fritz Kreisler, Austrian violinist and composer (d. 1962)
- February 8 – Georgette Leblanc, operatic soprano (d. 1941)
- February 26 – Richard Wetz, German composer
- February 28 – Viliam Figuš-Bystrý, Slovak composer
- March 7 – Maurice Ravel, French composer
- April 4 – Pierre Monteux, French conductor (d. 1964)
- April 5 – Mistinguett, actress and singer (d. 1956)
- May – Paul Sarebresole, ragtime composer (d. 1911)
- July 17 – Donald Tovey, composer and musicologist (d. 1940)
- August 9 – Albert Ketèlbey, composer (d. 1959)
- August 18 – Samuel Coleridge-Taylor, composer (d. 1912)

== Deaths ==
- January 18 – Joseph Philbrick Webster, composer (b. 1819)
- January 25 – Leopold Jansa, violinist, composer and music teacher (b. 1795)
- February 1 – William Sterndale Bennett, composer (b. 1816)
- February 23 – Louise Michaëli, opera singer (b. 1830)
- March 3 – Adolf Reubke, organ builder (b. 1805)
- March 9 – Apollon Hussakovskyi, composer (b. 1841)
- March 15 – Christian Julius Hansen, composer (b. 1814)
- March 17 – Ferdinand Laub, violinist (b. 1832)
- March 19 – Jean-Baptiste Vuillaume, violin maker (b. 1798)
- May 2 – Matthias Durst, violinist and composer (b. 1815)
- June 3 – Georges Bizet, composer (b. 1838) (heart attack)
- September 15 – Louise Farrenc, pianist and composer (b. 1804)
- September 24 – William Walker, songwriter (b. 1809)
