= List of compositions by Giovanni Bottesini =

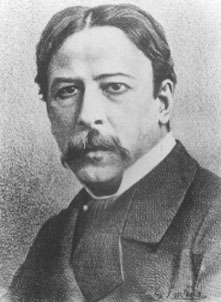
Giovanni Bottesini

The following is a list of compositions by Giovanni Bottesini (1821–1889). A new comprehensive catalogue, created by Stephen Street can now be found on the Bottesini Urtext website bottesiniurtext.com/bottesini-s-catalogue

== Operas ==
- Colón en Cuba (Cristoforo Colombo) – Opera in one act. Spanish libretto by Ramón de Palma and Rafael María de Mendive. Tacón Theatre, Havana January 31, 1848. No known score remains.
- L'assedio di Firenze (1856)
- Il diavolo della notte (1858)
- Marion Delorme (1862)
- Vinciguerra (il bandito) - Opéra-bouffe en un acte (1870)
- Alì Babà (1871)
- Ero e Leandro (1879)
- La regina del Nepal (1880)
- Nerina (1882)
- Azaële o La figlia dell'angelo (never performed)
- Cedar (never performed)
- Babele (never performed)

== Orchestral works ==
- Symphony in D major (1836)
- Arabian Nights (1878)
- Alba sul Bosforo (1881 al Teatro San Carlo di Napoli)
- Promenade des ombres
- Sinfonia Caratteristica
- Fantasia funebre "alla memoria del colonnello Nullo"
- Graziella
- Marcia Funebre
- Marcia Orientale
- Margherita
- Ouverture
- Divertimento per corno da caccia (bugle) and orchestra
- Andante sostenuto, for string orchestra
- Ero e Leandro, Prelude
- Il diavolo della notte, Sinfonia
- Ali Baba, Overture

== Works for double bass ==
=== with piano ===
- Adagio melanconico appassionato (Elegie par Ernst)
- Gran Allegro di Concerto "à la Mendelssohn"
- Allegretto-Capriccio in F♯ minor ("à la Chopin")
- Capriccio di bravura
- Elegy No. 1 in D major (1870)
- Elegy No. 2 in E minor, "Romanza drammatica"
- Elegy No. 3 in E minor, "Romanza patetica" (Melodia)
- Rêverie (1870)
- Tarantella in A minor
- Fantasia Cerrito
- Fantasia on Bellini's "Norma"
- Fantasia on Bellini's "Beatrice di Tenda"
- Fantasia on Bellini's "I Puritani" (adapted from duo with cello)
- Fantasia on Bellini's "La Straniera"
- Fantasia on Bellini's "La Sonnambula"
- Gran Fantasia on Donizetti's "Lucia di Lammermoor"
- Fantasia on Verdi's "Il Trovatore"
- Introduzione e Gavotta in A major
- Introduction et Variations sur Le Carnaval de Venise
- Variations on Nel cor più non mi sento from Paisiello's La "Molinara"
- Introduzione e Bolero
- Introduzione e Fuga
- Meditazione: Aria on G string from Suite BWV 1068 by J.S.Bach
- Melodia No. 1
- Melodia No. 2
- Melodia No. 3
- Melodia No. 4: Auld Robin Gray, Introduction and Variations on a Scottish Song
- Serenata from Rossini's "Barber of Seville"
- Aria from Verdi's "Il trovatore"
- Una furtiva lacrima, Romanza on Donizetti's "L'Elisir d'amore"
- Finale of Bellini's "La sonnambula"
- Contrabass-Polka
- Nocturne

=== with orchestra ===
- Concerto No. 1 "Concerto di bravura" in A major for double bass (1840)
- Concerto No. 2 in B minor for double bass (1853) (I. Allego moderato; II. Andante; III. Finale. Allegro quasi una polacca)
- Concerto No. 3 in F♯ minor for double bass (1871) (I. Allego moderato; II. Andante; III. Finale. Allegro con fuoco)
- Concertino in C minor for double bass (I. Moderato: II. Andante; III. Finale) (version of Concerto No. 2, for double bass and strings)
- Concerto a Due Contrabbassi No. 1 (Gran Duo Concertante) for 2 double basses and orchestra/piano (original version, 1844)
- Gran Duo Concertante for violin, double bass and orchestra/piano (1846) (arranged by Bottesini for Violin + Double bass and later updated for its publication)
- Gran Duo Concertante for clarinet in A, double bass and orchestra/piano
- Concerto a Due Contrabbassi No. 2 Passione Amorosa (I. Allegro deciso; II. Andante-Allegro; III. Allegretto), for double bass (or cello), 2nd double bass and orchestra/piano
- Duo Concertant on Themes of Bellini's "I Puritani" for cello, double bass and orchestra (original version of Puritani Fantasy)
- Duet for clarinet and double bass
- Concerto in G major, for cello and double bass

=== duets ===
- 3 Grandi Duetti, for 2 double basses:
  1. No. 1 (I. Allegro; II. Andante; III. Polacca. Molto allegro)
  2. No. 2 (I. Allegro; II. Andante; III. Rondò. Allegretto)
  3. No. 3 (I. Andantino; II. Presto)
- Duo in D major, for cello and double bass (I. Allegro; II. Andante molto; III. Allegro)
- Capriccio, for 2 double basses and piano
- 3 Fantasie on Rossini's Canzonette, for 2 double basses and piano:
  1. La danza: Allegro non troppo
  2. La serenata: Andante
  3. I marinai: Allegro moderato

== Chamber music ==
- String Quartet No. 1 in B minor
- String Quartet No. 2 in B♭ major, Op.2
- String Quartet No. 3 in F♯ minor
- String Quartet No. 4 in D major
- String Quartet No. 5 in E♭ major
- String Quartet No. 6 in E minor
- Quintet No. 1 in C minor "Gran Quintetto"
- Quintet No. 2 in E minor
- Quintet No. 3 in A major
- Quintet No. 4 in F major
- Morceaux, for viola and piano
- Rêverie, for viola and piano
- Capriccio, for cello and piano
- 3 Melodies, for cello and piano
- Rêverie, for cello and piano

== Piano solo ==
- Preludio
- Fugue in A minor
- 3 Polke:
  1. Arlecchino
  2. Brighella
  3. La Tremblante

== Vocal ==
- Il lamento della Ghisa (Le chagrin de Jeanne) in D major, for soprano and piano (1870)
- Melodia: Giovinetto innamorato, for soprano and piano
- Ci divide l'ocean, for soprano and piano
- Romanza: Dove fuggiste mai, for soprano and piano
- Romanza: Une bouche aimeé, for soprano, double bass and piano
- Terzetto: Tutto che il mondo serra (transcription of Etude No. 19 in C♯ minor, Op.25/7 by Chopin) for soprano, double bass and piano

== Sacred works ==
- Messa da Requiem (1877/80)
- Il Giardino degli Ulivi (Garden of Olivet), Oratorio for soprano, contralto, tenor, bass + mixed chorus (SATB), organ (1887)

== Instrumental music not including the solo double bass ==
- Morceaux – Viola and piano; autograph score, Naples
- Rêverie – Viola and piano; autograph score, Naples
- Capriccio – Cello and piano; autograph score, Milan August 25, 1863
- Three melodies – Cello and piano; autograph score, Milan
- Rêverie – Cello and piano; autograph score, Naples
- Various string quartets
- Various string quintets
