= 1877 in music =

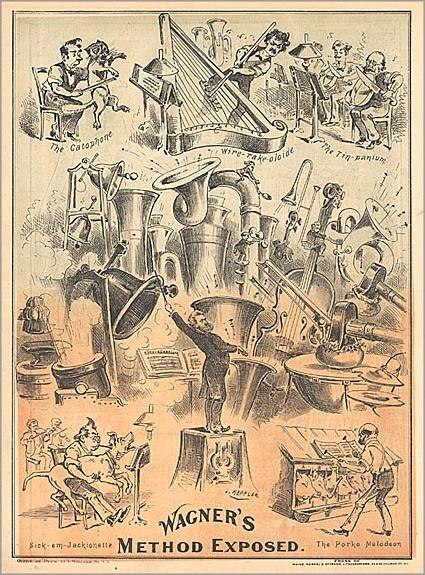
1877 caricature of Richard Wagner

This article is about music-related events in 1877.

== Events ==
- March 4 (February 20 O.S.) – The premiere of the ballet Swan Lake («Лебединое озеро», Lebedinoye ozero) with score by Peter Ilyich Tchaikovsky is given at the Bolshoi Theatre in Moscow. It is not well received at this performance although remains in the repertory.
- April 27 - Jules Massenet's opera Le Roi de Lahore premieres at the Palais Garnier in Paris, becoming popular across Europe.
- April 30 – French poet Charles Cros describes a method of recording sound, the Paleophone.
- May 7–29 – Wagner Festival at the Royal Albert Hall in London. Richard Wagner conducts some of his own works and Hans Richter makes his British conducting debut.
- July 18 (July 6 O.S.) – Peter Ilyich Tchaikovsky marries Antonina Milyukova in Moscow. After 6 weeks, the couple separate permanently.
- Summer – Richard Strauss and Ludwig Thuille meet as students at Innsbruck. They become lifelong friends.
- November 21 – Thomas Edison announces his invention of the phonograph in the United States.
- December 16 – The premiere of Bruckner's Symphony No. 3 in D minor (in a revised version) is given by the Vienna Philharmonic under the composer's baton. Many of the audience walk out.
- December 30 – The premiere of Brahms' Symphony No. 2 in D major, Op. 73 (composed this summer at Pörtschach am Wörthersee) is given by the Vienna Philharmonic under the baton of Hans Richter.

== Published popular music ==
- "Abdul Abulbul Amir" w.m. Percy French
- "Captain Cuff" w.m. G. W. Hunt
- "Chopsticks" (waltz) m. Arthur de Lulli (Euphemia Allan)
- "Dear Old Pals" w.m. G. W. Hunt
- "Early In De Mornin'" w.m. Will Hays
- "In The Gloaming" w. Meta Orred (1874) m. Annie Fortescue Harrison
- "Little Daisy's Request" by Arabella M. Root
- "The Lost Chord" w. Adelaide Anne Procter (1858) m. Arthur Sullivan
- "My Name Is John Wellington Wells" w. W. S. Gilbert m. Arthur Sullivan
- "Out of Work" by Septimus Winner
- "Phelim O'Toole" by Harry Banks
- "Time Was When Love And I Were Well Acquainted" w. W. S. Gilbert m. Arthur Sullivan

== Classical music ==
- Giovanni Botteisni – Messa da Requiem
- Johannes Brahms – Symphony No. 2 in D, Op. 73
- Anton Bruckner – Symphony No. 3 in D minor, WAB 103 (Novak edition)
- Felix Draeseke – Fata Morgana, Op. 13
- Antonín Dvořák – String Quartet No. 9, Op. 34 in D minor
- Robert Fuchs – Violin Sonata No. 1, Op. 20 in F♯ minor
- Karl Goldmark – Violin Concerto No. 1, Op. 28 in A minor
- Theodor Kirchner – 4 Notturnos, Op.28
- Ignaz Lachner – 3 Charakterstücke, Op.83
- Franz Liszt – Les Jeux d'eaux à la Villa d'Este for piano.
- Giuseppe Martucci – Piano Quintet, Op.45
- Jules Massenet – Aubade
- Leon Minkus – La Bayadère (ballet)
- Joachim Raff – Violin Concerto No. 2, Op. 206 in A minor
- Josef Rheinberger – Violin Sonata No. 2, Op. 105 in E minor
- Camille Saint-Saëns
  - Piano Concerto No.4, Op.44
  - La Jeunesse d'Hercule, Op.50
  - Six Études for piano (including 'En forme de valse')
  - Vogue, vogue la galère
- John Philip Sousa
  - Myrrha Gavotte, Op.30
  - Across the Danube, Op.36
- Richard Strauss – Piano Sonata No.1 in E major
- Sergey Taneyev – Venice at Night
- Pyotr Ilyich Tchaikovsky
  - Francesca da Rimini, premiered March 9 in Moscow
  - Swan Lake (ballet)
- Francis Thomé – Simple aveu, Op.25
- Anton Urspruch – Deutsche Tänze, Op.7
- Charles-Marie Widor – 6 Mélodies, Op.22

== Opera ==
- Emmanuel Chabrier – L'étoile
- Charles Gounod – Cinq-Mars, CG 10, premiered April 5 in Paris
- Peter Heise – Monarch and Constable
- Jules Massenet – Le roi de Lahore
- Camille Saint-Saëns – Samson et Dalila
- Charles Villiers Stanford – The Veiled Prophet of Khorossan

== Musical theater ==
- The Chimes of Normandy, adapted from Les Cloches de Corneville, Broadway production opened at the Fifth Avenue Theatre on October 22 and ran for 16 performances
- Les Cloches de Corneville by Robert Planquette, Paris production opened at the Folies-Dramatique on April 19 and ran for 408 performances
- Le Grand Mogol, Marseilles production
- Orpheus in the Underworld by Jacques Offenbach, London revival
- The Sorcerer, Gilbert & Sullivan London production opened at the Opera Comique on November 17 and ran for 175 performances

== Births ==
- January 12 – Maude Nugent, songwriter (d. 1958)
- January 22 – Edward Moore, American music critic, music journalist, writer on music, composer, and songwriter (d. 1935)
- February 16 – Sergei Bortkiewicz, Russian composer and pianist (d. 1952)
- March 4 – Aleksandr Gedike, composer (died 1957)
- April 9 – Hughie Cannon, songwriter (died 1912)
- May 25 – Billy Murray, singer (d. 1954)
- June 3 – Theodor Szántó, composer (died 1934)
- June 8 – Thorvald Aagaard, Danish composer (d. 1937)
- June 11 – Renée Vivien, lyricist (died 1901)
- July 14 – Agnes Nicholls, operatic soprano (d. 1959)
- July 17 – Edward Madden, American lyricist (d. 1952)
- July 24 – Percy Scholes, English musicologist (d. 1958)
- July 27 – Ernő Dohnányi, Hungarian composer, conductor and pianist (d. 1960)
- August 22 – Lucien Garban, French composer (died 1959)
- September 6 – Buddy Bolden, ragtime musician (d. 1931)
- September 7 – Petar Stojanović, violinist and composer (d. 1957))
- September 15 – Daisy Wood, music hall singer (d. 1961)
- September 20 – Kato van der Hoeven, Dutch cellist (d. 1959)
- September 26 – Alfred Cortot, Franco-Swiss pianist (d. 1962)
- October 15 – Helen Ware, stage actress (died 1939)
- October 24 – Ernst Mielck, Finnish composer (d. 1899)
- November 21 – Sigfrid Karg-Elert, German composer (d. 1933)
- December 27 – Otto Gauß, organist (died 1970)

== Deaths ==
- January 1 – Julie Berwald, operatic soprano, member of the Royal Swedish Academy of Music.
- January 18 – George Tolhurst, composer (b. 1827)
- March 23 – Caroline Unger, operatic contralto (b. 1803)
- March 30 – Charles Neate, British pianist (born 1784)
- April 7 – Errico Petrella, opera composer (b. 1813)
- April 26 – Louise Bertin, composer and poet (b. 1805)
- June 3 – Ludwig Ritter von Köchel, cataloguer of the works of Mozart (b. 1800)
- June 13 – Cesare Ciardi, flautist and composer (b. 1818)
- June 24 – Emilie Edie von Kalchberg, lyricist (born 1796)
- June 29 – Clorinda Corradi, operatic contralto (b. 1804)
- August 5 – Luigi Legnani, guitarist and composer (b. 1790)
- September 12 – Julius Rietz, German cellist, composer and teacher, editor of an edition of Mendelssohn's complete works (b. 1812)
- October 3 – Thérèse Tietjens, operatic soprano (b. 1831)
- October 16 – Théodore Barrière, librettist (b. 1823)
- October 28 – Johann von Herbeck, conductor (b. 1831)
