= Camillo Sivori =

Italian violinist and composer (1817–1894)

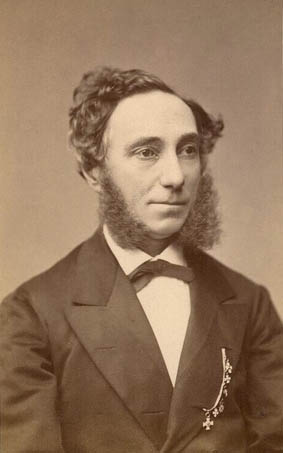
Camillo Sivori

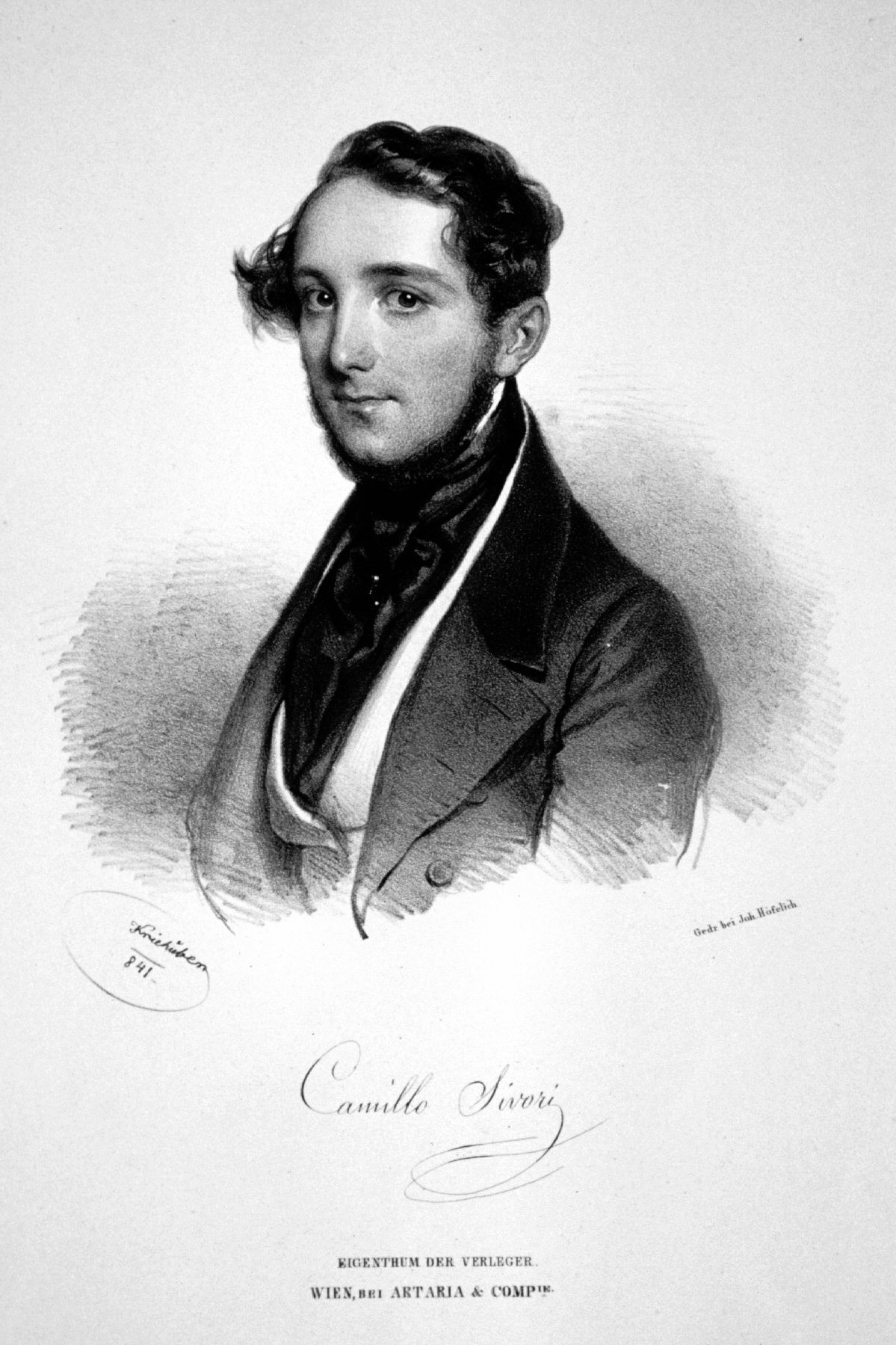
A portrait of a young Camillo Sivori, in 1841

Ernesto Camillo Sivori (June 6, 1817 – February 18, 1894) was an Italian virtuoso violinist and composer.

== Life ==
Early life

Born in Genoa, he was the only known pupil of Niccolò Paganini. He also studied with composer Antonio Restano (1790–1885), Paganini's teacher Giacomo Costa (1760s or 70s-~1836?) and Agostino Dellepiane.

In 1827, Sivori began the career of a travelling virtuoso which lasted almost without interruption until 1864. On November 18, 1846, he performed at the Howard Athenaeum in Boston, where he played La Campanella and The Carnival of Venice. He performed Mendelssohn's violin concerto for the first time in England in 1846, and was in England again in the seasons of 1851 and 1864. In 1864, he formed a permanent trio with cellist Alfredo Piatti and pianist Charlotte Tardieu.

Camillo Sivori also collaborated with Giuseppe Verdi. In 1893 Verdi heard Sivori's performance at his private music soirée and noted Sivori's impeccable technique, agility and musicianship. Sivori's performances ideas were directly influenced by opera characters. His violin techniques, in many instances were executed to impersonate human sounds. Sivori understood that he was the only violinist alive (in the late 1800s) who could immortalize Paganini's art of violin playing and unique operatic interpretations. The school of violin playing was rapidly changing and Paganini's art was rapidly being forgotten. He lived for many years in Paris, and died in Genoa on February 19, 1894.

Sivori's playing can be heard in a wax recording, originally attributed to August Wilhelmj. It was recorded when the violinist was close to death.

It is important not to misunderstand Sivori's interpretation of Le streghe in the wax recording. It may be assumed that the extremely wide vibrato used in the piece is in imitation of opera singing. However, this is not the case as Sivori never uses such a wide vibrato in the other pieces, and because opera singing at this time used a much narrower vibrato than that of the modern day. It is much more likely that Sivori used such an exaggerated vibrato as a special effect; it is a rather humorous and unsettling imitation of an old witch's singing. The fact that this wide vibrato resembles the wide vibrato in modern opera singing is merely a coincidence.

He collaborated with composers of his day, including Franz Liszt. He played the first performance of Luigi Cherubini's "Requiem" in E minor.

He owned many valuable instruments, including violins by Amati, Antonio Stradivari, Carlo Bergonzi, Gaetano Chiocchi, and Jean-Baptiste Vuillaume.

Sivori's favourite violin was the Vuillaume violin, which he received as a gift from Paganini. It was an impeccably close copy of Paganini's famous Cannone Guarnerius. This violin is owned by the Musei Di Genova and displayed in their Palazzo Tursi.

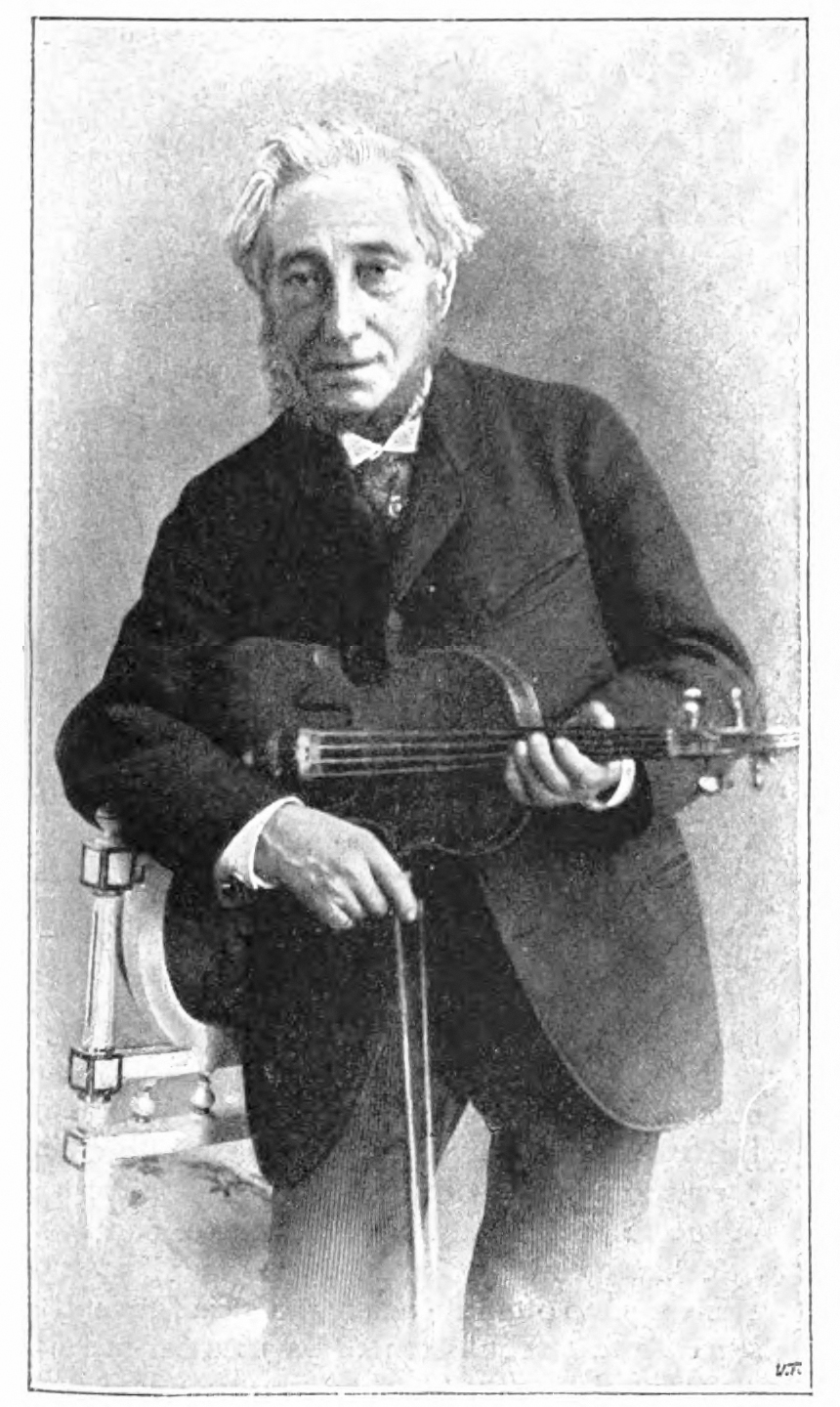
Camillo Sivori in 1894

Sivori was known to adapt many peculiar pieces such that he could play them, and many of these pieces, once thought absurd, have now become quite popular. However, Giovanni Bottesini's Gran Duo Concertante, which was a double concerto originally written for two double basses alternating the melody, was not one of these. Although Sivori played it many times as a duo with Bottesini, the version for violin and double bass, had been made much earlier.

== Personal life ==
Sivori married in 1855 the French comedic actress Hortense Damain (d.1881)

== See also ==
- List of violinists
- Luthiers
