= Willem Kes =

Dutch conductor, composer, violist and violinist

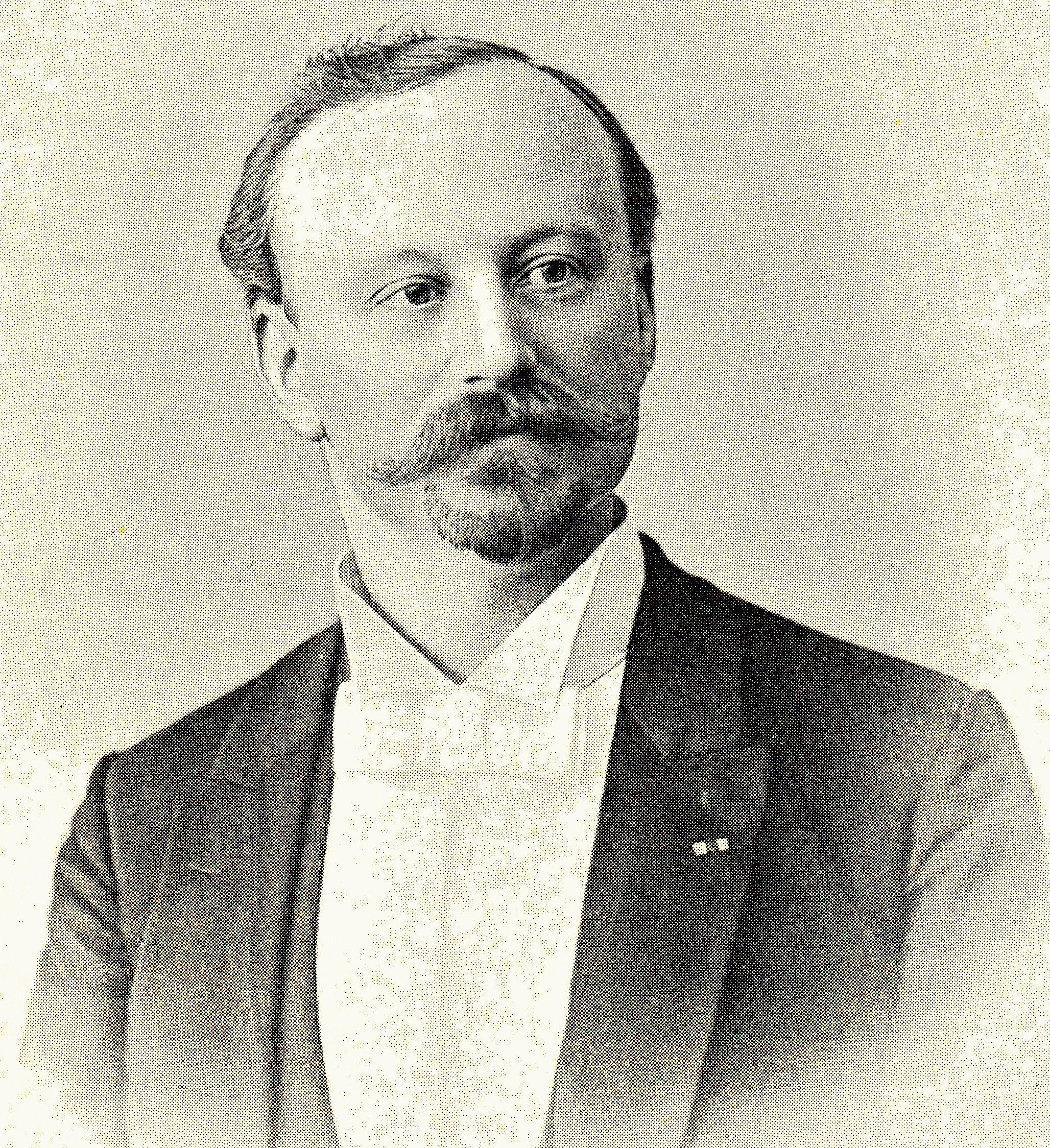

Background information
- Born: 16 February 1856; Dordrecht, Netherlands
- Died: 22 February 1934 (aged 78) Munich, Nazi Germany
- Genre: Classical
- Occupations: Conductor, pedagogue
- Formerly of: Concertgebouw Orchestra; Scottish Orchestra

Willem Kes (16 February 1856 – 22 February 1934) was a Dutch conductor, composer, violist and violinist. He was the first principal conductor of the Concertgebouw Orchestra of Amsterdam, holding that position from 1888 to 1895.

== Life ==
=== Early life and education ===
Willem Kes was born in Dordrecht on 16 February 1856. He was the son of the dairy trader Adrianus Stoffel Kes and Cornelia Maria Krekelenbrug. He received his initial training as a violist and composer in Dordrecht with Ferdinand Böhme (harmony), Theodorus Thijssens (violin) and Friedrich Wilhelm Nothdurft (piano). At the time, he also performed with the local orchestra.

Admitted to the Leipzig conservatory, Kes studied with the composers Ferdinand David and Carl Reinecke. During his stay in Leipzig, he married Bertha Auguste Elise Koch. He completed his studies at the Brussels Conservatory with violinist-composer Henryk Wieniawski and Louis Brassin, partly financing his studies partly by taking part in performances. Additional studies in composition and fugue followed in Berlin with Joseph Joachim, Friedrich Kiel and Wilhelm Taubert.

In 1877, he was appointed leader of the first Amsterdam Park Orchestra and the Amsterdamsche Orkest-Vereeniging. A year later, in 1878 he became director of the Dordrecht division of the Rotterdam Music Society (Maatschappij ter Bevordering der Toonkunst), followed by the conductorship of the newly formed Park Orchestra (Parkorkest) at the Parkschouwburg in the Amsterdam Plantage neighborhood in 1883.

=== Concertgebouw Orchestra ===
This made him the prime contender for the post of chief conductor when a new orchestra was created for the Concertgebouw in 1888. He was tasked to put together the entirely new Concertgebouworkest, according to his wishes, in order to stimulate the nascent musical scene in the Netherlands.

Kes put an end to the 19th-century habit of viewing a musical performance as primarily a social event. He put music first and instilled strict discipline in both his musicians and the audience. Orchestra members who were late for rehearsals were fined. Those who played badly had to stay after school and study their parts in the boardroom. Of the audience, he demanded silence during performances and forbade the consumption of refreshments during rehearsals and concerts, which was still common until that time.

Under Kes' direction and drill, the Concertgebouw Orchestra grew to international fame. He introduced symphonic poems by Richard Strauss to the Netherlands: Don Juan in 1891 and Macbeth a year later. Another innovation consisted in the establishment of theme concerts, the first one in 1893 with only modern French composers, attended by Vincent d'Indy and Ernest Chausson. The Dutch premiere of Antonín Dvořák's New World symphony took place under Kes in May 1895. Under his leadership as conductor, many international soloists played with the Concertgebouw Orchestra, including violinists Pablo de Sarasate, Eugène Ysaÿe, Joseph Joachim and Leopold Auer, pianists Eugen d'Albert and Teresa Carreño, and Portuguese baritone Francisco d'Andrade sang.

Kes was also active as a teacher of viola and cello. During his time in Amsterdam, his students included the young Dutch cellist, Kato van der Hoeven.

=== Career after the Concertgebouw ===
His salary at the Concertgebouw Orchestra consisted of 5,000 guilders a year, far below that of his foreign colleagues. The orchestra members also earned relatively little, between 500 and 1200 guilders a year. This was part of the reason why Kes went to Scotland to accept a better-paying post. When Kes retired in 1895 to join the Scottish Orchestra in Glasgow, his successor Willem Mengelberg played Franz Liszt's Piano Concerto in E flat major as soloist at the farewell concert. Thanks to Kes, Mengelberg (24) was put in charge of a very disciplined orchestra, which under his direction grew into one of the major orchestras of the world.

With his Scottish orchestra, he gave a number of concerts in the Netherlands in 1898. After his time in Scotland, Kes left that year for Moscow. He concluded his musical career in Koblenz, where he was director of the conservatory and conductor of the Musikverein from 1905 to 1926. He died in Munich at the age of 78. His body is interred at the Stahnsdorf South-Western Cemetery near Berlin.

== Honors and recognition ==
In 1894 Kes was made a knight in the Order of Orange-Nassau. About the same time, the Russian Empire also granted him Knighthood of the Order of St. Stanislaus. The Willem Kesstraat is a side street of Beethovenstraat, in the Amsterdam borough of Amsterdam-Zuid. Dordrecht has a Willem Kes Park, while other cities also have named public spaces after him.

== Compositions ==
Kes wrote works for orchestra (including a Symphony in E Major), chamber music (including a voluminous violin sonata and a Romance in g minor dedicated to Eugène Ysäye) and songs. The idiom used by Kes is mainly late romantic. In addition to his own compositions, a number of manuscripts have survived containing arrangements and transcriptions of works by other composers. His Violin Concerto No. 1 was performed with some regularity, sometimes with himself as the soloist.

=== Orchestral (selection) ===
- Concert Overture No. 1 (1874)
- Charakteristische Tanzweisen for violin & orchestra, Op. 3 (1876)
- Andante for cello and orchestra (1879 of 1882)
- Concert Overture No. 2 (1880)
- Violin Concerto No. 1 (<1883)
- Cello Concerto (1886)
- Symphony in E flat major (1894)
- Hymn of the Dutch and British Anthems (1895)
- Violin Concerto No. 2 in F sharp major (1904)
- Slovakian Rhapsody for violin and orchestra
- Serenade for Orchestra, Op. 8
- Im Nordfjord, Symphonic Poem

=== Chamber Music (selection) ===
- Violin Sonata No. 1 in F minor, Op. 4 (1869)
- Große Sonate for violin and piano No. 2 (1874)
- Serenade (1885)
- Bagatellen, Sechs kleine Stücke für Klavier, Op. 12
- Sonata for String Quartet, Op. 28
- Musik für 4 Streichinstrumenten
- Fraueninsel (1924)

=== Choral works (selection) ===
- Der Taucher, Cantata to a text by Friedrich Schiller, Op. 9. (1877)
- Kriegslied (1914)
- Wein her, from Lieder eines fahrenden Gesellen by Rudolph Baumbach.

=== Songs (selection) ===
- Winternacht, for baritone, to a text by Eichendorff, Op. 13
- Stimmen des Lebens
- Songs, Op. 11

=== Piano (selection) ===
- Ungarischer Tanz (1872)
- Mazurka No. 1 in D sharp (1876)
- Allegro (ma non troppo) vivace
- Fantasie-Stück No. 2
- Mazurka No. 2
- Tanzstückchen
