= Tacón Theatre =

Former theatre in Havana, Cuba

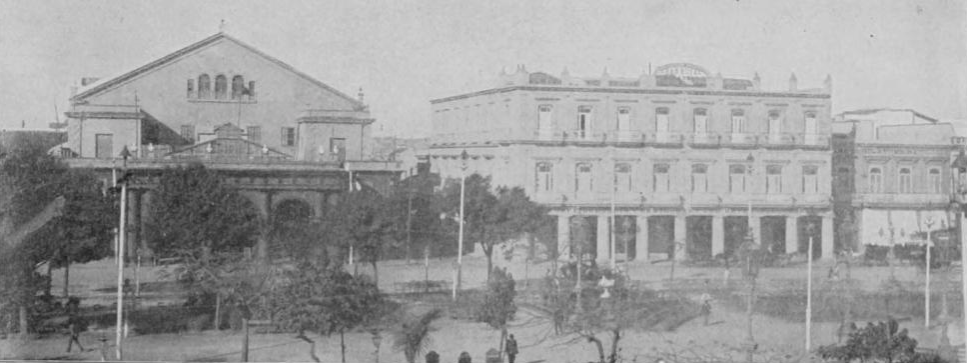
- Interactive map of the Tacón Theatre area

General information
- Coordinates: 23.137039°N 82.359289°W

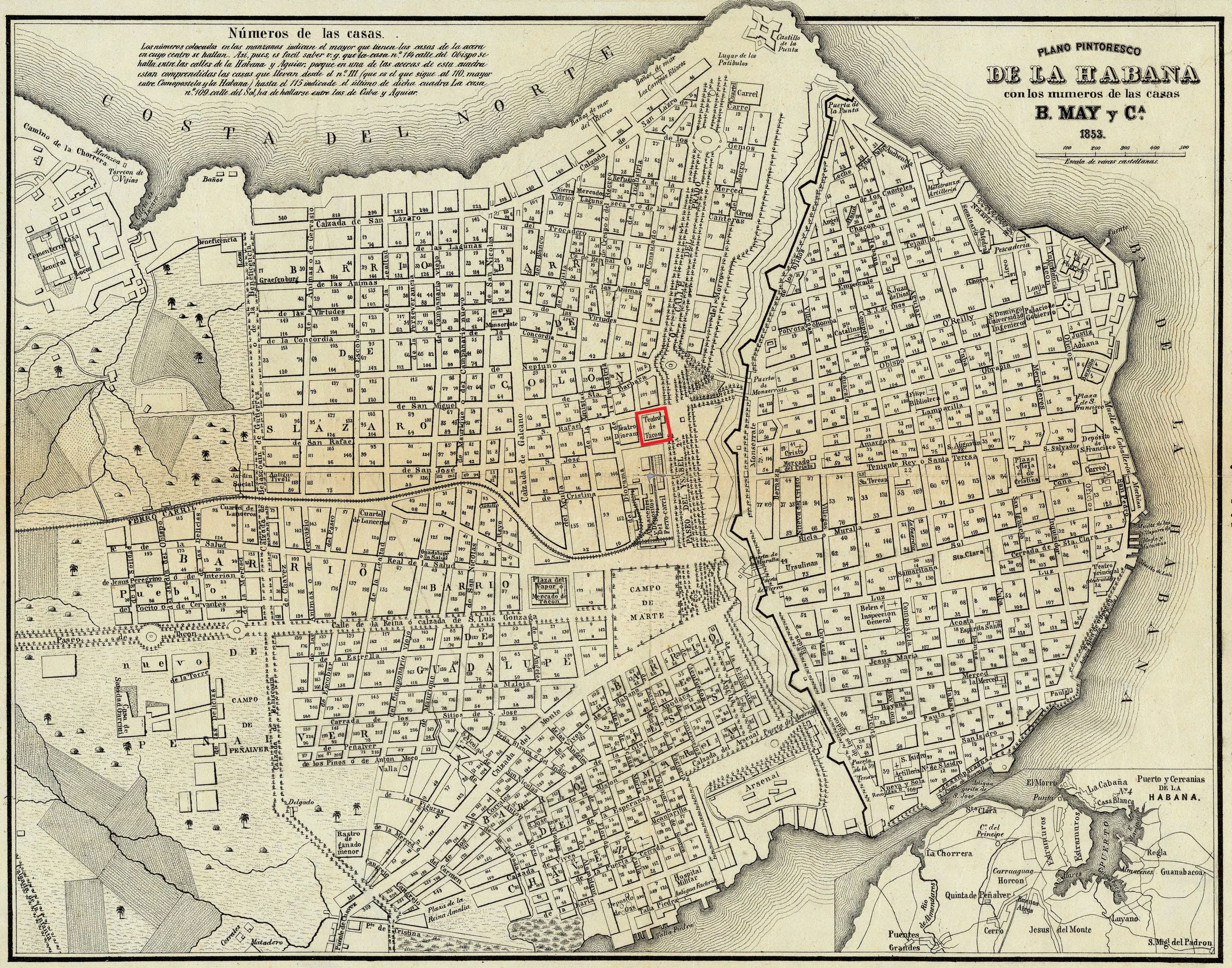
Teatro Tacón in 1853 Map of Havana.

The Teatro Tacón (Tacón Theatre) opened in 1838 in Havana, Cuba. Its auditorium contained 2,750 seats. It was built by Pancho Martí, a businessman from Barcelona who moved to Havana, and named after Miguel Tacón y Rosique, Governor of Cuba from 1834 to 1838. In 1847 Bottesini's opera Cristoforo Colombo premiered there. By 1855, so many people attended events that the city issued parking regulations for carriages on performance nights.

== Architecture ==
The Teatro Tacón had excellent acoustics, so much so that the Gran Teatro de La Habana was built around its old hall. Architect Paul Belau and U.S. firm Purdy and Henderson, Engineers kept the original structure and built the Centro Gallego (Galician Center), a European-styled addition and renovation for the purpose of enlarging its functions as well as serving as a means of introducing an elaborate system of circulation into an otherwise simple, and architecturally modest, preexisting box.

== Gallery ==
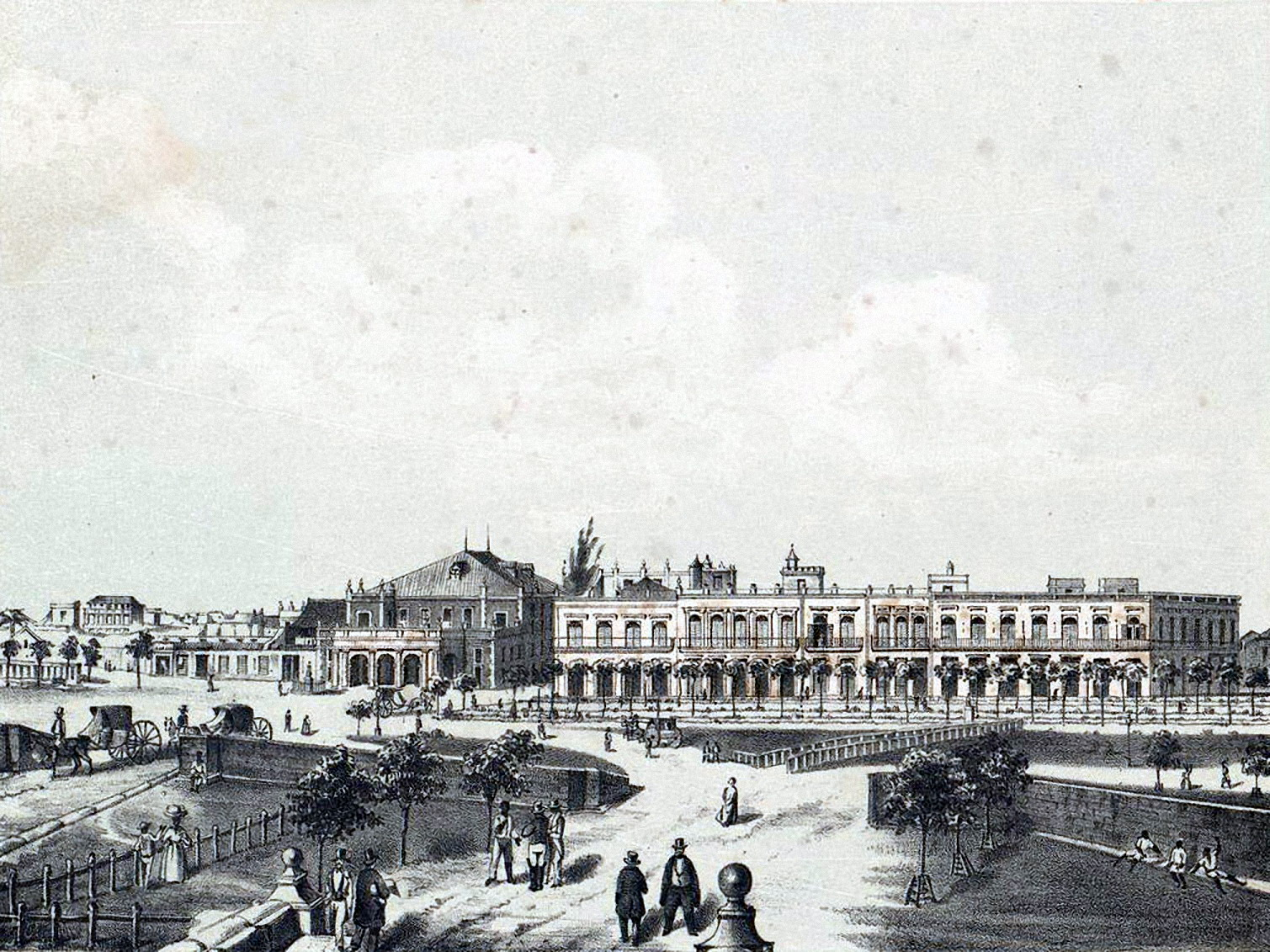

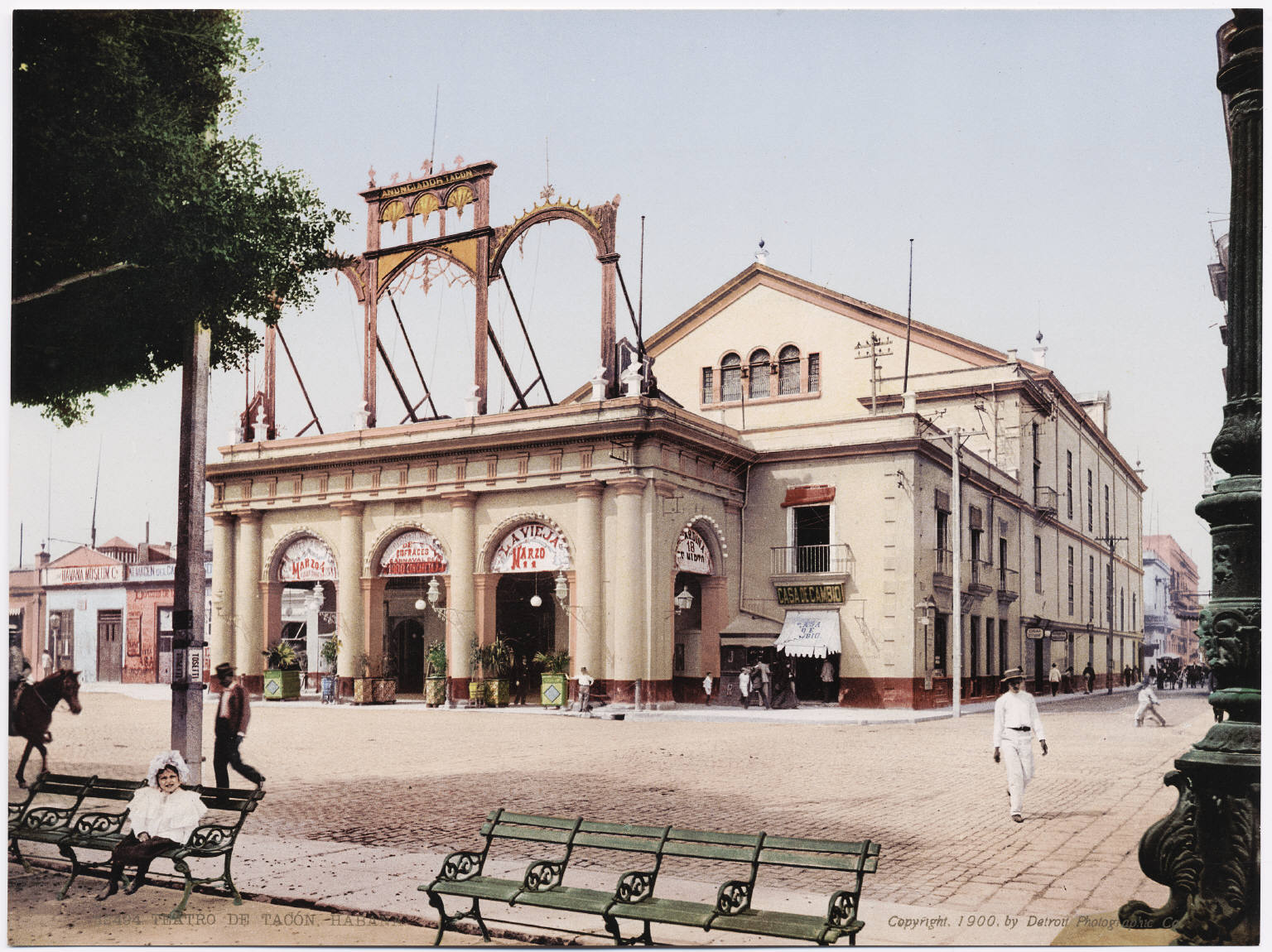
Teatro Tacón, Havana, 1900

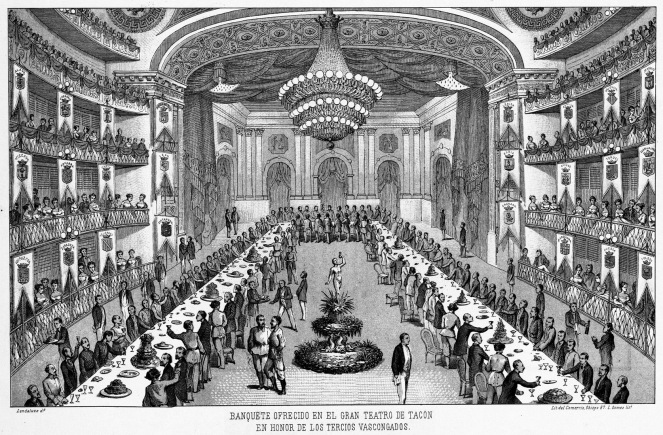
Teatro Tacón

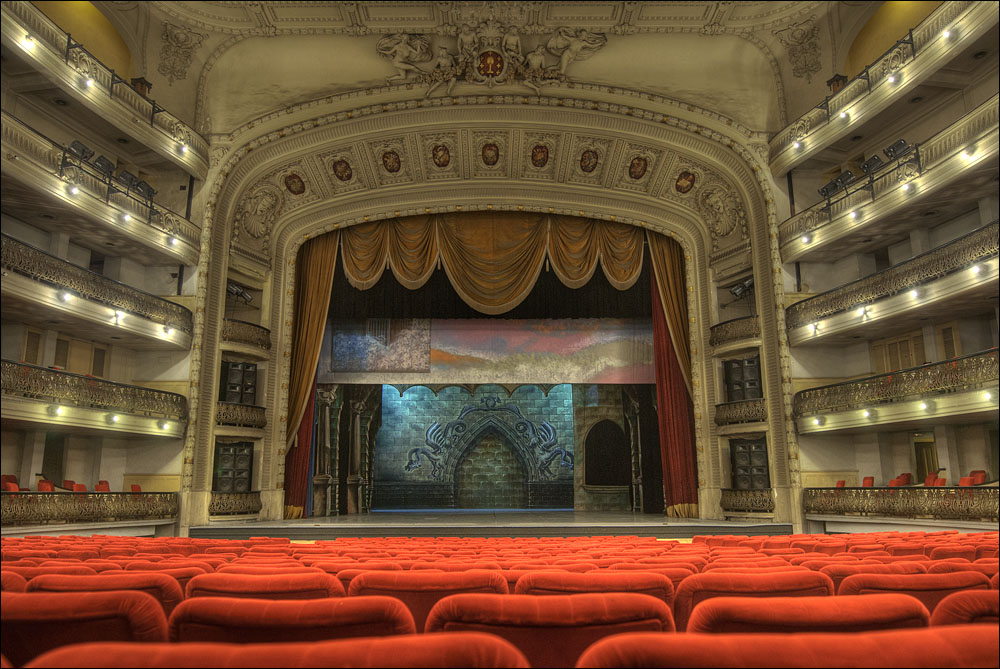
Gran Teatro de La Habana

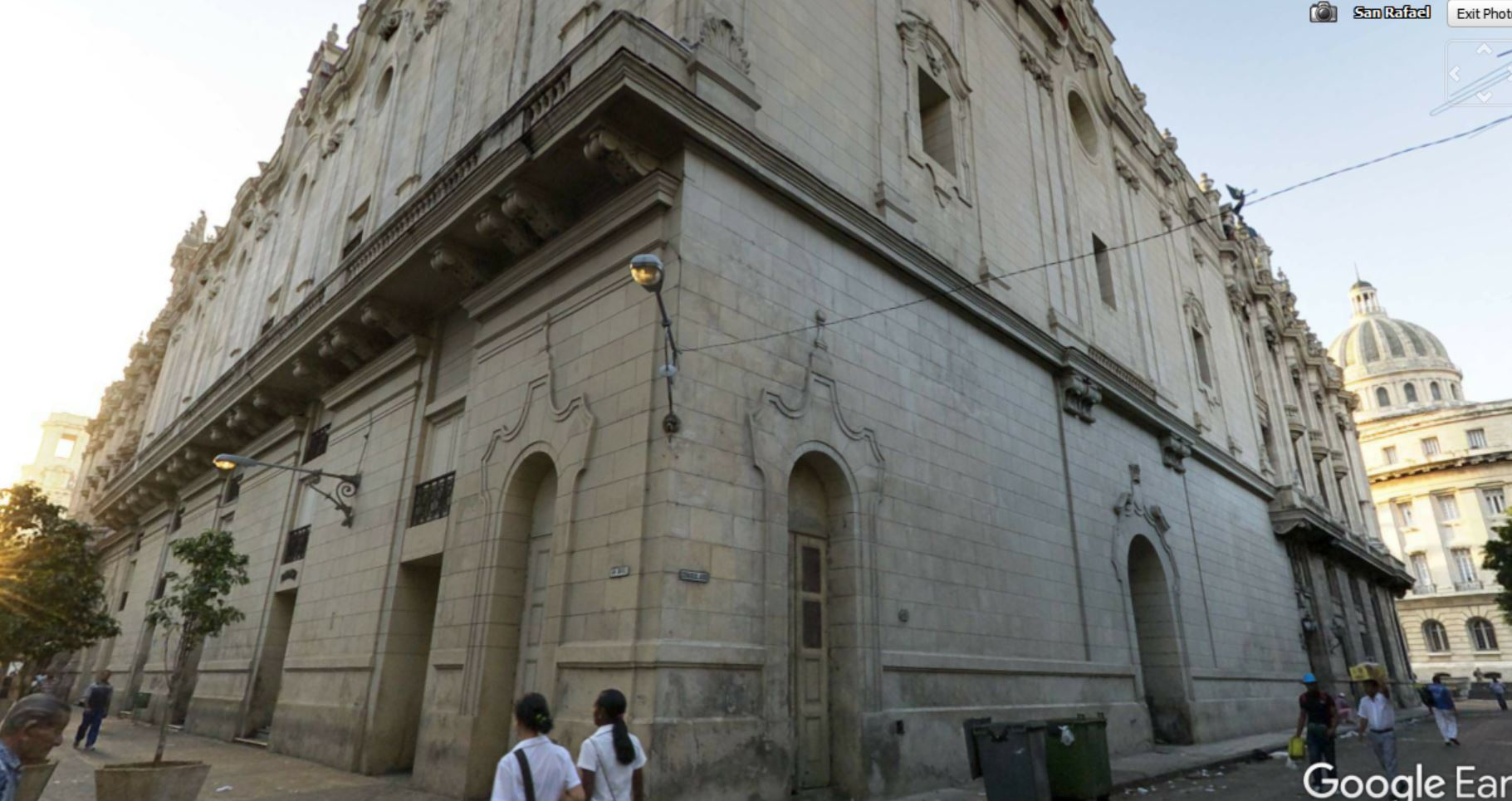
Back of the original theatre at Calles San Rafael and Consulado

== Bibliography ==
- Jacobo de la Pezuela (1863). "Habana: Edificios de Recreo: Teatro de Tacon". Diccionario geografico, estadístico, historico, de la isla de Cuba (in Spanish). Vol. 3. Madrid: Mellado.
- Serafín Ramírez (1891). "De 1830 a 1840". La Habana artística: Apuntes históricos (in Spanish). Havana: Imp. del E. M. de la Capitanía General. pp. 133+. (+ Theater programs, p. 657-660)

== See also ==
- Gran Teatro de La Habana
- Paseo del Prado, Havana
- Plaza del Vapor, Havana
