= Gran Teatro de La Habana =

Theater in Havana, Cuba

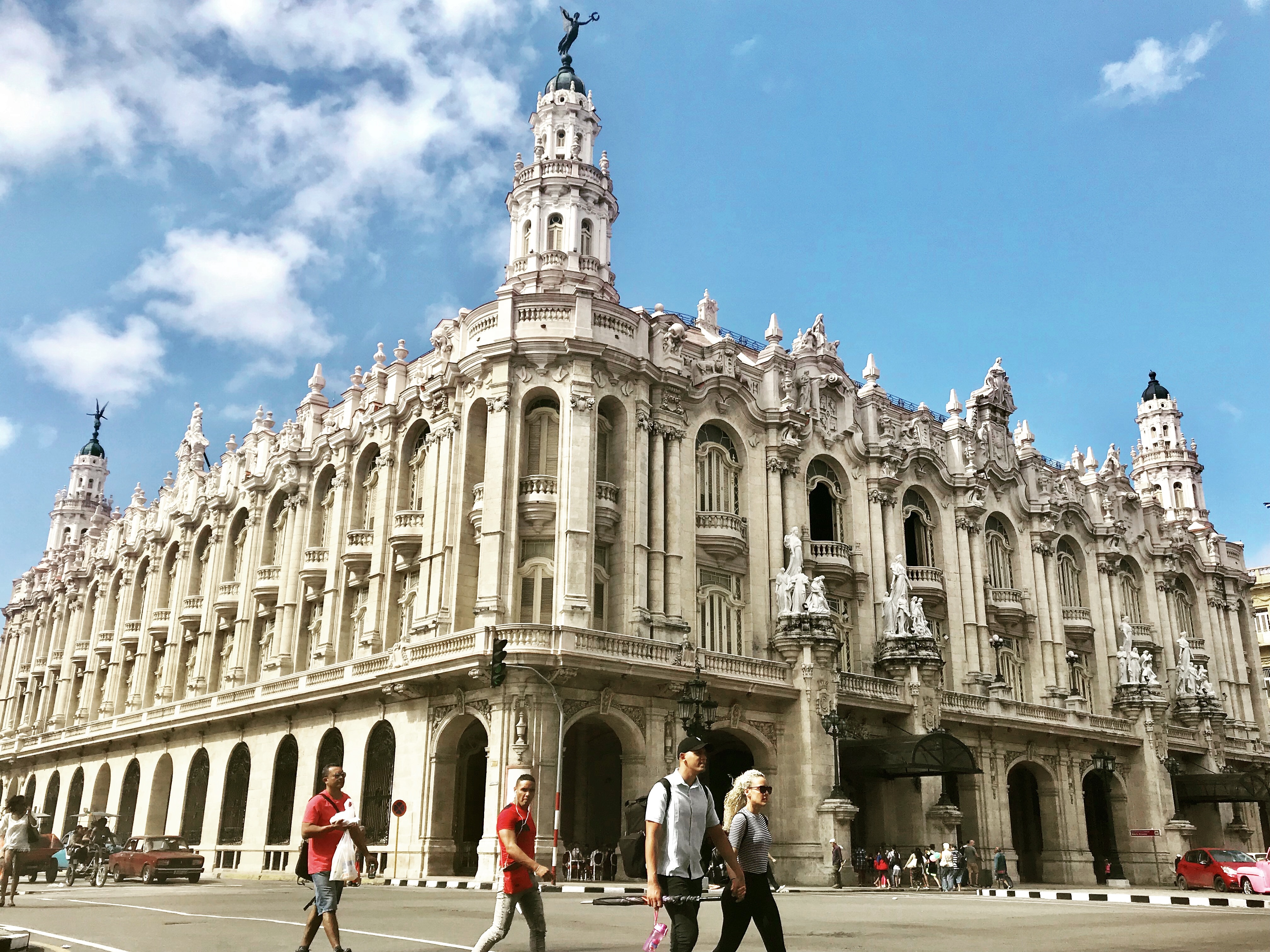
- Interactive map of Gran Teatro de La Habana
- Former names: Palacio del Centro Gallego; Gran Teatro - Centro Gallego (1902–1961); Teatro Federico García Lorca (1961–1977); Liceo de La Habana Vieja (1977–1985); Gran Teatro de La Habana (1985–2015)
- Location: Paseo del Prado, Havana, Cuba
- Coordinates: 23.1369°N 82.3594°W
- Owner: National Government
- Capacity: 1,500 (García Lorca Auditorium)
- Type: Opera house and performing arts center
- Events: Ballet, opera, flamenco

Construction
- Opened: 1915
- Renovated: 1914, 2004, 2015
- Architect: Paul Belau

Tenants
- National Ballet of Cuba (1950–present); International Ballet Festival of Havana (1960–present)

Gran Teatro de La Habana is a theater in Havana, Cuba, home to the Cuban National Ballet. It was designed by the Belgian architect Paul Belau and built by Purdy and Henderson, Engineers in 1914 at the site of the former Teatro Tacón. Its construction was paid for by the Galician immigrants of Havana to serve as a community-social center. Located in the Paseo del Prado, its facilities include theatres, a concert hall, conference rooms, a video screening room, as well as an art gallery, a choral center and several rehearsal halls for dance companies. It hosts the International Ballet Festival of Havana every two years since 1960.

In the 1910s, the other historic Tacón Theatre was partially demolished and the performance hall was incorporated into the current Great Theatre of Havana.

== History ==
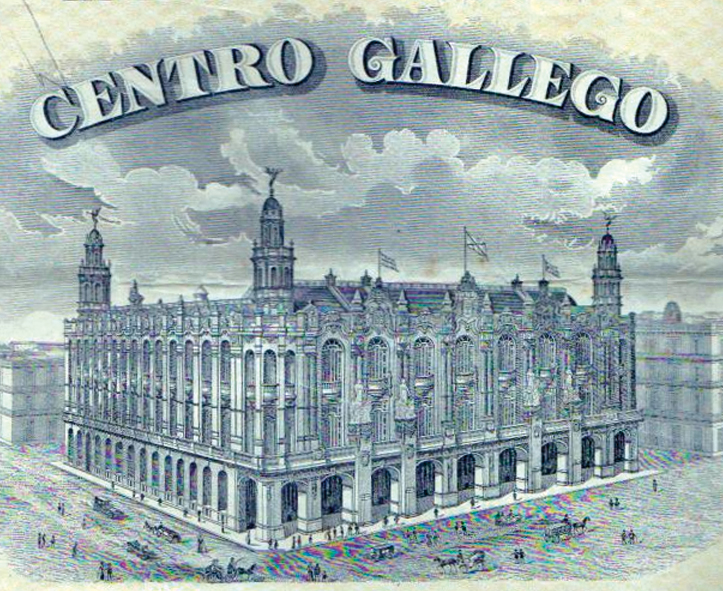
Gran Teatro de la Habana, 1915.

Since its inception in 1838, Teatro Tacón had occupied the north-western part of the site bounded by Paseo del Prado and Calle Consulado and Calles San Rafael and San José. Its auditorium hosted such European artists as Enrico Caruso and Sarah Bernhardt. During the first years of Cuban independence when thousands of immigrants arrived in Cuba from Spain, a new building addition was constructed around the concert hall of Teatro Tacón. Originally known as the Centro Gallego de La Habana, the building is decorated with sculptures by Giuseppe Moretti representing benevolence, education, music and theatre.

Currently, the principal venue is the García Lorca Auditorium, with seats for 1,500 persons, it provides a home for the Cuban National Ballet Company, and for other dance companies and musical performances. During the 19th and 20th century, performances that took place on its stage include: Ole Bull, Enrico Caruso, Fanny Elssler, Jenny Lind, Anna Pavlova, Antonia Mercé, Ruth Saint Denis, Ted Shawn, Teresa Carreño, Vicente Escudero, Maya Plisetskaya, Clorinda Corradi, Sarah Bernhardt, Carla Fracci and Alicia Alonso, as well as companies such as the American Ballet Theatre, the Royal Winnipeg Ballet, Antonio Gades ballet, the Ballet of the Colón Theatre of Buenos Aires, the Ballet Folclórico of Mexico, plus other ballet companies.

== Architecture ==
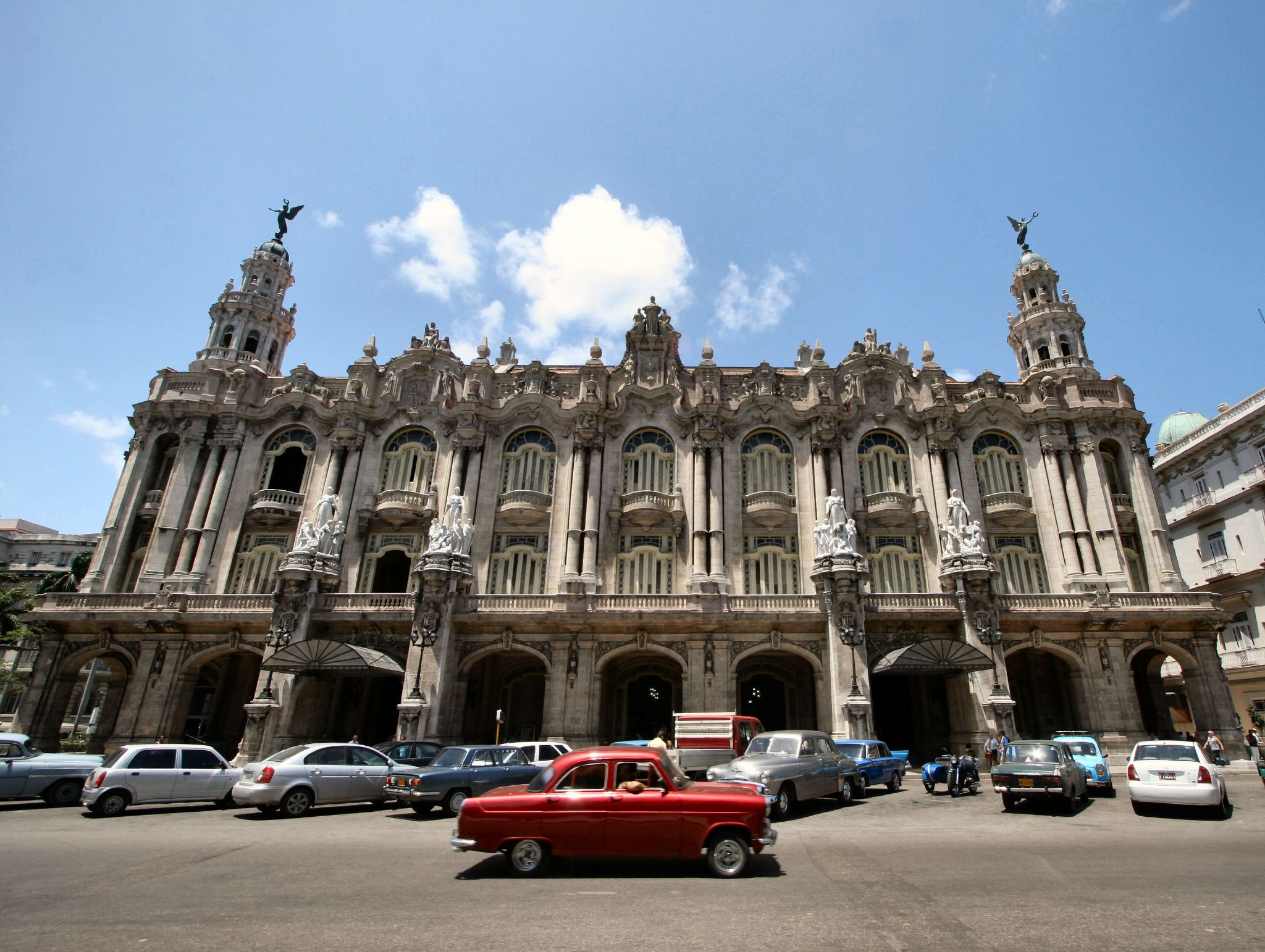
Detail showing the architectural connection of the Centro Gallego to the new stone facing of 1838 Teatro Tacon on Calle San Rafael.

The Centro Gallego a Baroque Revival building, (Note: "The Baroque Revival, also known as Neo-Baroque, was an architectural style of the late 19th century. The term is used to describe architecture and architectural sculptures which display important aspects of Baroque style, but are not of the original Baroque period. Elements of the Baroque architectural tradition were an essential part of the curriculum of the École des Beaux-Arts in Paris, the pre-eminent school of architecture in the second half of the 19th century, and are integral to the Beaux-Arts architecture it engendered both in France and abroad. An ebullient sense of European imperialism encouraged an official architecture to reflect it in Britain and France, and in Germany and Italy the Baroque revival expressed pride in the new power of the unified state." Source: Baroque Revival architecture) was built around the old concert hall of the Teatro Tacón located at the corner of Calles of San Rafael and Consulado. Architect Paul Belau, architect of the Presidential Palace, and the U.S. firm Purdy and Henderson, Engineers, kept the original theatre and built the Centro Gallego, a Baroque Revival style building addition that enlarged the support functions of the concert hall and introduced an elaborate system of circulation. The exterior of the original Teatro Tacón received a new stone facing to harmonize with the new exterior of the Centro Gallego.

== Sculpture ==
Allegories of Music and other figures

There is a group of four sculptures in white marble, part of a group of ninety-seven, by Giuseppe Moretti and Geneva Mercer (Note: "Circa 1911–14, Moretti and Geneva Mercer worked together on their greatest achievement, the completion of Moretti's ninety-seven sculptures for the Gran Teatro de La Habana." Wikipedia) representing charity, education, music and theater.

A bronze sculpture was revealed in 2018 by the Cuban sculptor José Villa Soberón, a sculpture of Alicia Alonso in the lobby of the Gran Teatro. The sculpture is named Giselle after the romantic ballet that brought the legendary dancer to world fame. Giselle premiered in 1841 at the Paris Opera and is one of the main titles within the repertoire of the National Ballet of Cuba. It is therefore no coincidence that the artist chose this classic to represent the figure.

== Performance ==
During the 19th and 20th century, performances that took place on its stage include: Ole Bull, Enrico Caruso, Fanny Elssler, Jenny Lind, Anna Pavlova, Antonia Mercé, Ruth Saint Denis, Ted Shawn, Teresa Carreño, Vicente Escudero, Maya Plisetskaya, Clorinda Corradi, Sarah Bernhardt, Carla Fracci and Alicia Alonso, as well as companies such as the American Ballet Theatre, the Royal Winnipeg Ballet, Antonio Gades ballet, the Ballet of the Colón Theatre of Buenos Aires, the Ballet Folclórico of Mexico, plus other ballet companies. The principal venue is the García Lorca Auditorium, with seats for 1,500 persons, provides a home for the Cuban National Ballet Company, and for other dance companies and musical venues.

== Gallery ==
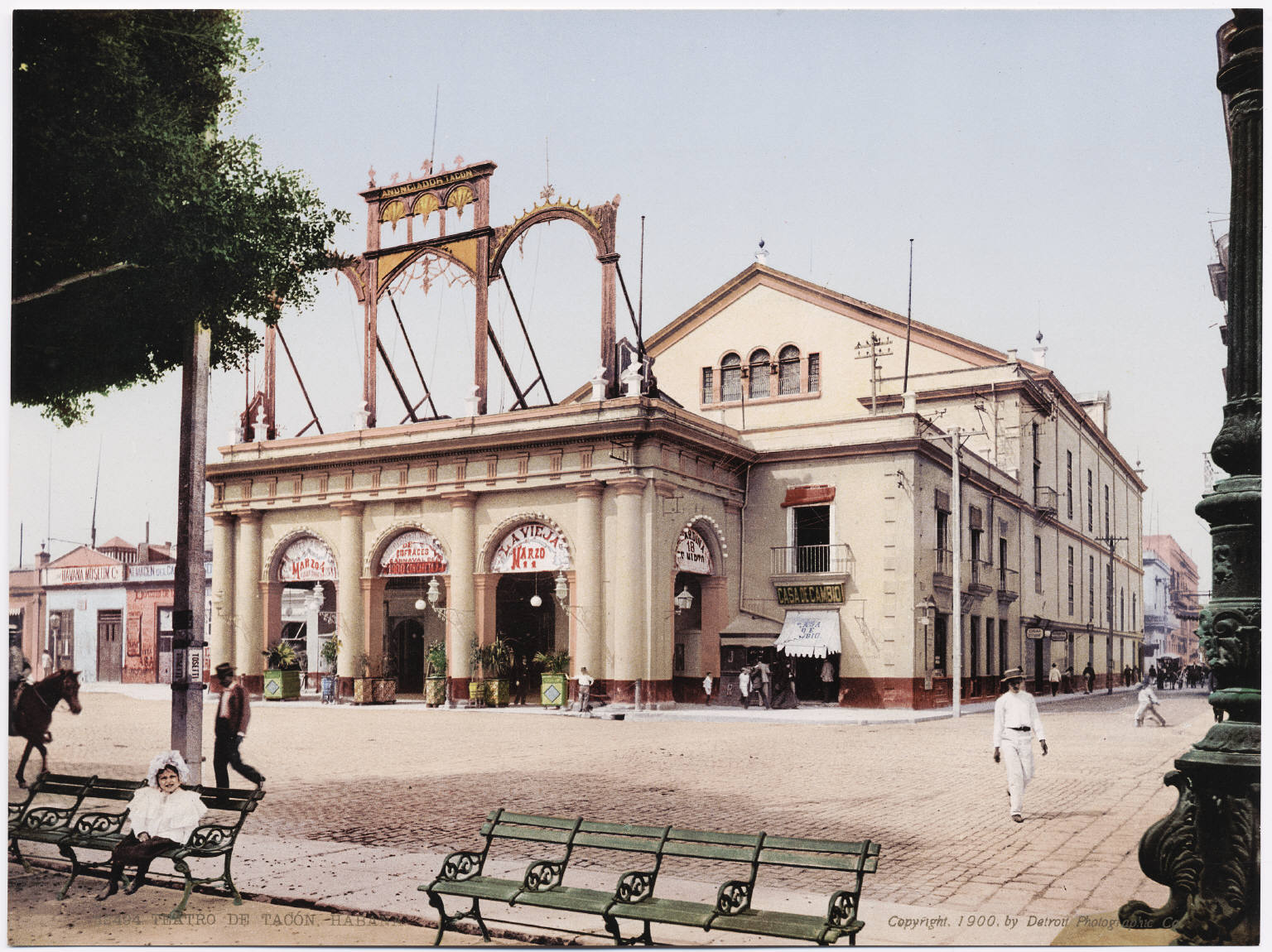
Teatro Tacón, Havana, 1900

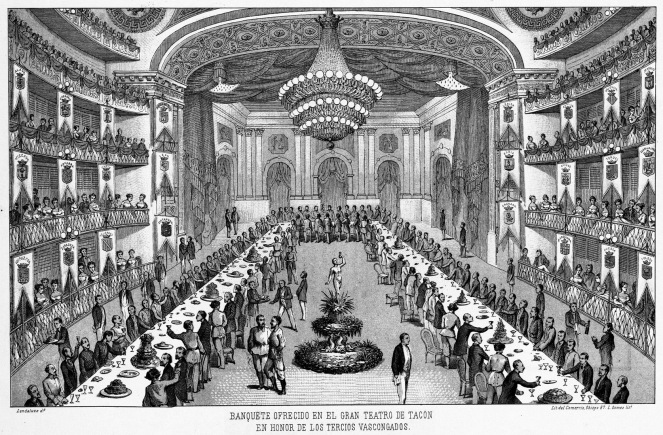
Illustration of a banquet held in the Teatro Tacón

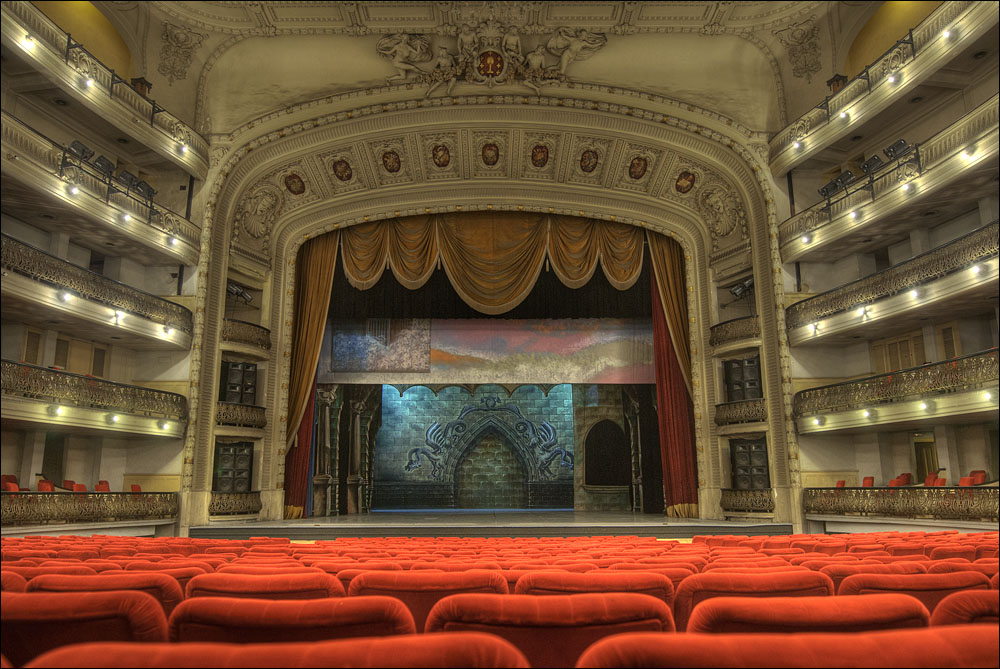
Gran Teatro de La Habana

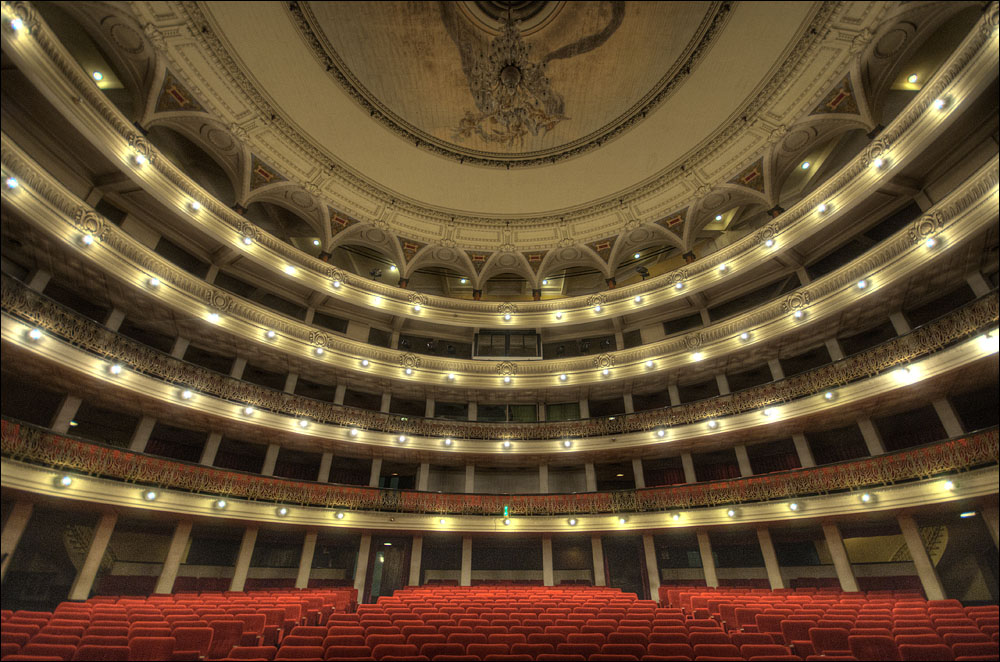
Concert hall of the Teatro Tacon renamed Sala García Lorca.

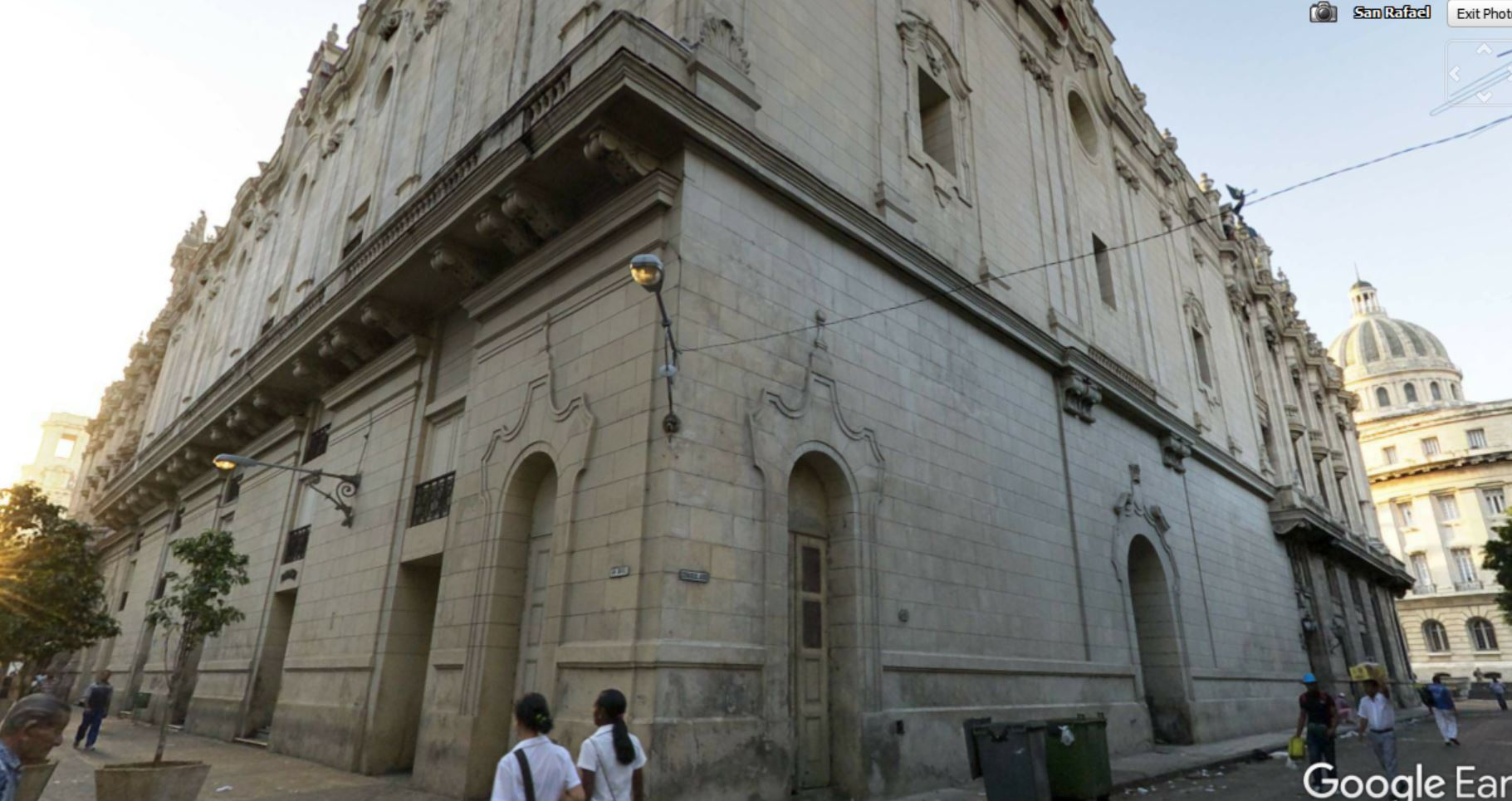
New stone facing over original Tacón Theatre. Calles of San Rafael and Consulado.

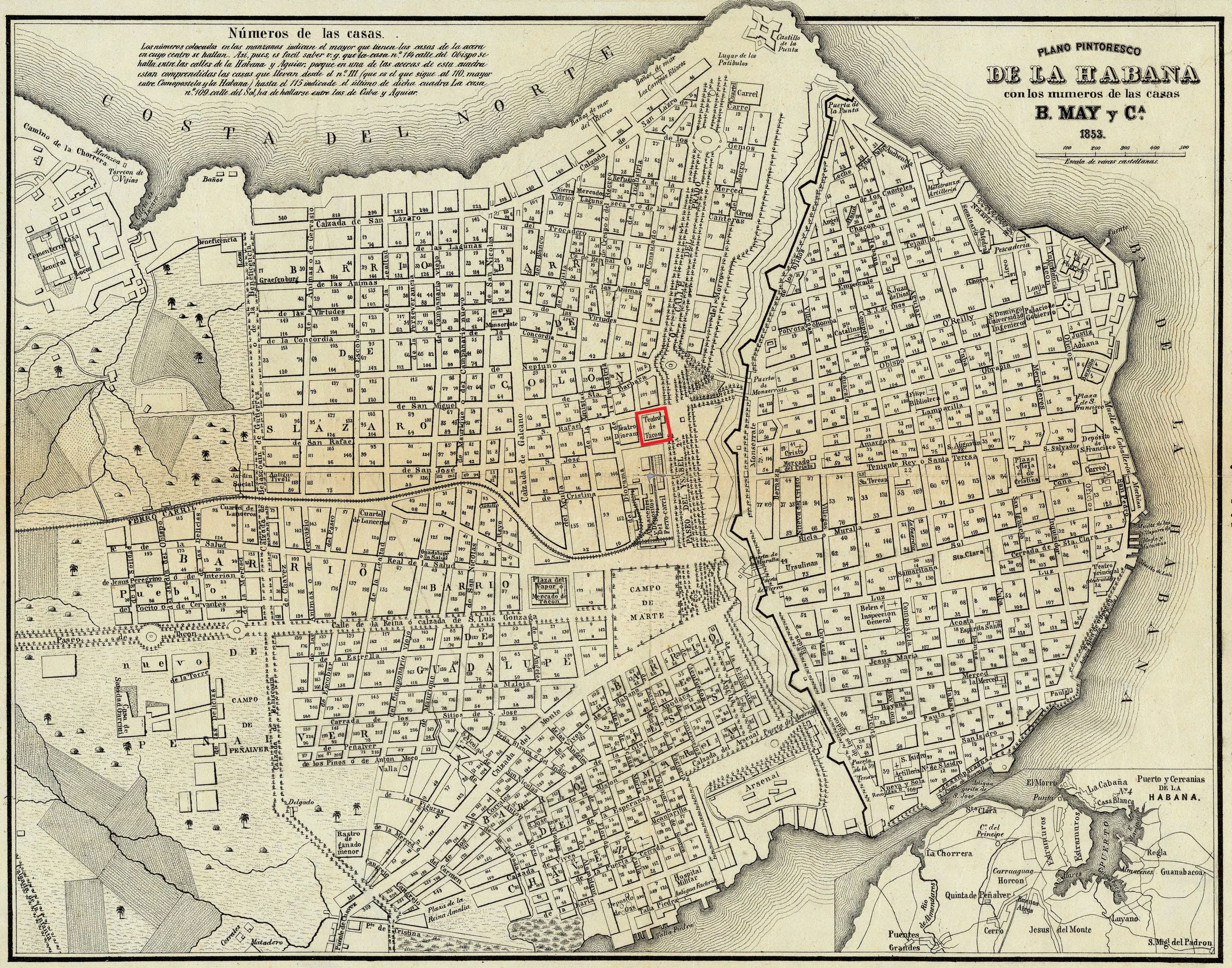

Palacio del Centro Gallego in about 1916

== See also ==
- List of buildings in Havana
- Purdy and Henderson, Engineers
- Teatro Tacón

== Bibliography ==
Jacobo de la Pezuela (1863). "Habana: Edificios de Recreo: Teatro de Tacon". Diccionario geografico, estadístico, historico, de la isla de Cuba (in Spanish). Vol. 3. Madrid: Mellado.
