= Kato van der Hoeven =

Dutch cellist

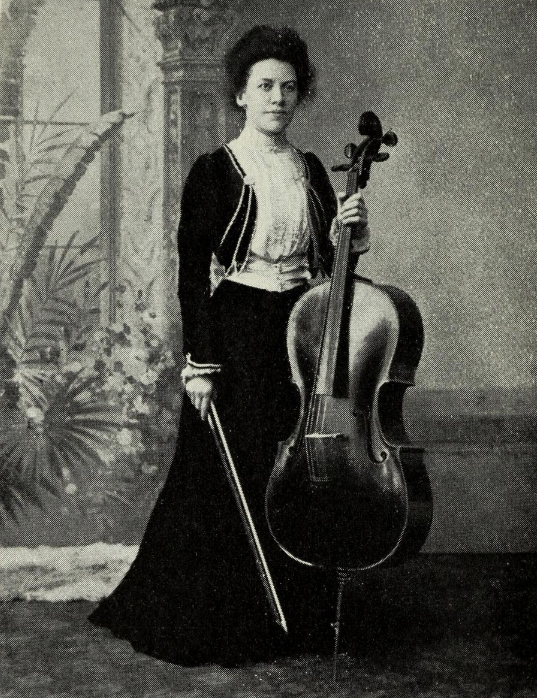
- The Dutch cellist Kato van der Hoeven
- Born: 20 September 1877; Amsterdam, Netherlands
- Died: 7 December 1959 (aged 82); The Hague, Netherlands
- Occupation: Cellist
- Parents: Gerrit van der Hoeven (father); Johanna Catharina Marx (mother)

Kato van der Hoeven (Amsterdam, 20 September 1877 – The Hague, 7 December 1959) was a Dutch cellist who was only the second woman cellist to join the Concertgebouw Orchestra in Amsterdam in 1897. She was also known for her performances with the all-female Amsterdam Trio that toured the Netherlands and England starting in 1906.

== Biography ==
Kato was the daughter of stable owner Gerrit van der Hoeven and Johanna Catharina Marx and she first learned the piano and violin as a child before switching to the cello. Her sister Dina van der Hoeven (1871–1940) also became a pianist who successfully toured the Netherlands and Germany.

She received her music training from Willem Kes and cello lessons from Isaac Mossel and "a finishing course" from Anton Hekking.

Orchestras at that time were only beginning to admit female musicians. The Concertgebouw Orchestra in Amsterdam hired its first woman in 1890, the cellist Valborg Lagervall and it wasn't until almost ten years later, on November 16, 1897, that van der Hoeven was invited to join her there. In addition to her orchestral services, van der Hoeven was active in chamber music. During this time she was also teaching at the Stern Conservatory, in Berlin.

During the winter season of 1901–1902, van der Hoeven made a guest appearance in the Berlin Holy Cross Church with a solo program and a review of the performance by "the piano teacher" was laudatory.

We are delighted to note that in Miss van der Hoeven we met a cellist of great skill. The lady played an Adagio by Bargiel, the cantilena from the A minor Concerto by Goltermann and the Air by Bach with a full, vocal tone; there is a primordial power in her bowing, a quality that many of her fellow artists lack.

=== Amsterdam Trio ===
From 1906–1913, van der Hoeven performed in the first Dutch female piano trio (sometimes called the Amsterdam Trio) joining violinist Nella Gunning and a pianist (first Nora Boas and then Fanny Gelbart), performing classical and romantic repertoire ranging from Joseph Haydn to Antonin Dvořák. The trio performed in many Dutch cities between 1908 and 1913 and in November 1908 they played in London with Johanna Heymann at the piano.

=== Later years ===
After 1917 Kato van der Hoeven retired from the orchestra and musical life. She lived for some time in Amsterdam before leaving for The Hague in 1946, where she died on 7 December 1959.
