= Double Bass Concerto No. 2 (Bottesini) =

Composition by Giovanni Bottesini

- by Giovanni Bottesini
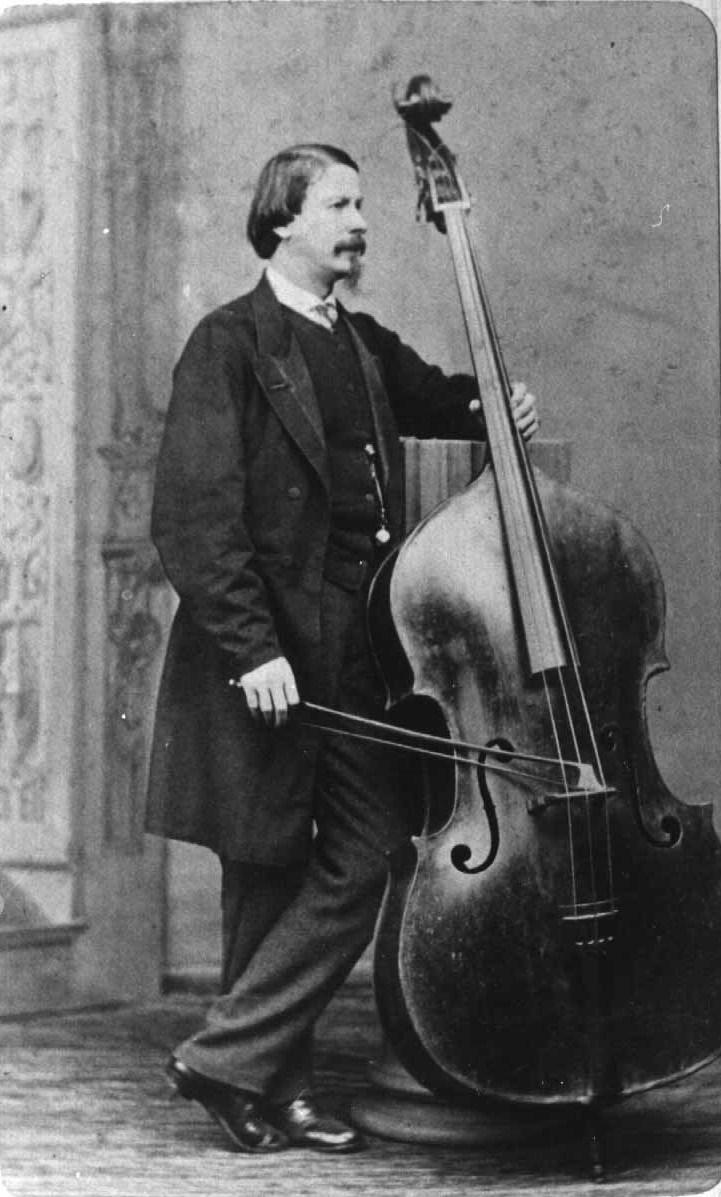
- Giovanni Bottesini in c. 1865 with his double bass
- Key: B minor
- Period: Romantic
- Composed: 1845
- Duration: 17 minutes
- Movements: 3
- Scoring: Double Bass and Orchestra

The Double Bass Concerto No. 2 in B minor is a composition for double bass and orchestra by Giovanni Bottesini. A typical performance lasts around 17 minutes. The concerto holds a central place in double bass repertoire, demonstrating a level of technical virtuosity that had not been seen before in the instrument.

== Background ==
The concerto was written in 1845 while Bottesini maintained a principal bass position at the Teatro San Benedetto in Venice. The original version of the piece was written while the composer was a student in the Milan Conservatory. In 1845, the composer expanded the orchestra to include woodwinds and brass while keeping the solo part. The concerto would see its first performance in 1851 by the composer himself. The work would not be published until 1925, well after the composer's death.

The concerto draws influences from multiple sources. Bottesini's career as an opera composer and conductor likely had a significant influence on his concerto, including its use of the bel canto and lament operatic styles. Additionally, the concerto displays characteristics of the romantic period in which it was composed.

After graduating from the Milan Conservatory, Bottesini acquired his Testore double bass, which he tuned two semi-tones higher than the conventional tuning of his time. This, in part, permitted him easier access to higher notes and chordal passages. His second concerto, like much of his other writing, encourages this tuning method.

== Form ==
As is typical of concertos, the work contains three movements:

=== I. Moderato ===
5–7 minutes

The first movement of the work opens in B minor. It has a short introduction, then takes on a lyrical bel canto style. As the work is written for a bass tuned up two semi-tones, the opening E sounds as an F♯. In the development section, measures 38-90, the solo and accompaniment parts are in dialogue. During these interactions, the double bass part demonstrates rapid string changes and a variety of articulations. After measure 90, the solo part prepares for the cadenza, creating tension with an F pedal point. Different cadenzas are commonly performed at the end of the first movements, with some soloists writing their own. Throughout the movement, the composer utilizes the entire range of the instrument, mimicking the human voice in both soprano and bass.

=== II. Andante ===
6–8 minutes

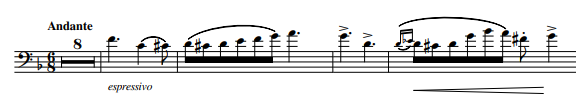

The second movement is lyrical and resembles an extended aria. The movement is characterized by dramatic, unexpected dynamic changes and the incorporation of operatic characteristics such as the Italian lament and bel canto styles.

=== III. Allegro ===
4-6 minutes

The third movement is a bravura dance with an excited temperament. It is marked in alla breve and uses a quarter note plus two eighth note rhythm It begins with a dramatic descending opening in the strings with a lively main theme, preparing for the double bass entrance. The movement utilizes large leaps and ends with a flourish from the soloist. The movement also has frequent interjections from the orchestra, giving an air of competition between the soloist and accompaniment.

== Instrumentation ==
The concerto is written for double bass solo and an orchestra consisting of flute, two oboes, two clarinets, two bassoons, two horns, two trumpets, and strings. A piano reduction of the orchestra parts was also written by the composer.

== Legacy ==
At the time of Bottesini's writing, the double bass was rarely used as a solo instrument. This likely contributed to the concerto's acclaim, displaying an underrepresented instrument. The concerto is now among the most performed works that feature the double bass, generating a growing interest in the instrument.

The concerto presents a distinct technical challenge for double bassists. It is the most difficult concerto learned by student bassists and is frequently performed in orchestral auditions, given the competitive nature of those positions. The work is also commonly required for advanced performance degrees and competitions, having been featured by well-known bass soloists.

== Recordings ==
- Rinat Ibragimov, Double Bass, January 12, 2012. Video on YouTube.
- Edgar Myer, Double Bass, March 10, 2018.Video on YouTube.
- Timothy Cobb, Double Bass, May 30, 2020 Video on YouTube
- Mikyung Sung, Double Bass, Nov 16, 2021. Video on YouTube
