= Messa da Requiem (Bottesini) =

Requiem by Giovanni Bottesini

- by Giovanni Bottesini
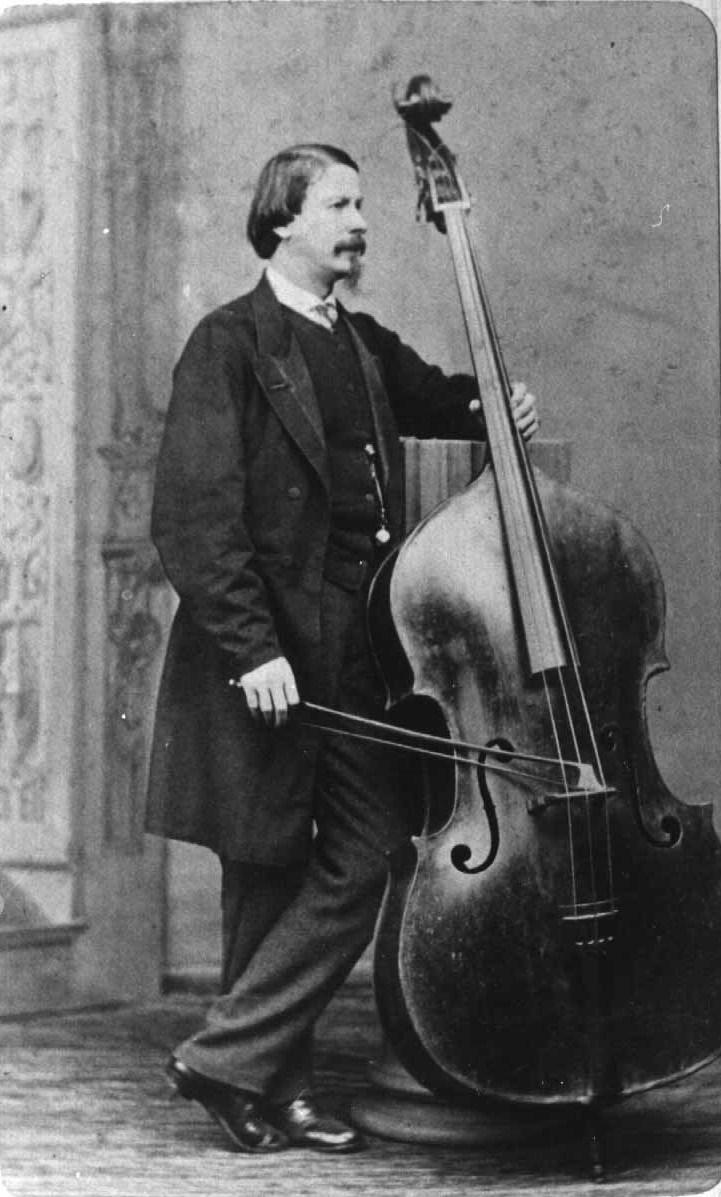
- Giovanni Bottesini in c. 1865 with his double bass
- Period: Romantic
- Composed: 1877
- Duration: 65 minutes
- Movements: 7
- Scoring: Chorus, vocal soloists, and orchestra

Messa da Requiem is a work for vocal soloists, choir, and orchestra by Giovanni Bottesini. The work runs sixty-five minutes.

== Background ==
In 1877, Giovanni Bottesini wrote the requiem was following the death of his brother, Luigi. The work was premiered in Capuchin chapel in Cairo where Bottesini was the conductor of the opera company. The first complete performance was on 24 March 1880 in the Teatro Regio in Turin.

== Form ==
The work contains seven movements:

1. Requiem aeternam - Adagio
2. Dies irae - Allegro
3. Offertorio: Domine Jesu - Andantino
4. Sanctus - Allegro
5. Benedictus - Andantino con moto
6. Agnus Dei - Andante
7. Libra me - Andante, allegro

== Instrumentation ==
The concerto is written for soprano, alto, tenor, and bass soloists in addition to a choir and orchestra consisting of piccolo, two flutes, two oboes, two clarinets, two bassoons, four horns, four trumpets, timpani, bass drum, cymbals, organ, and strings.
