= Clorinda Corradi =

Italian opera singer (1804–1877)

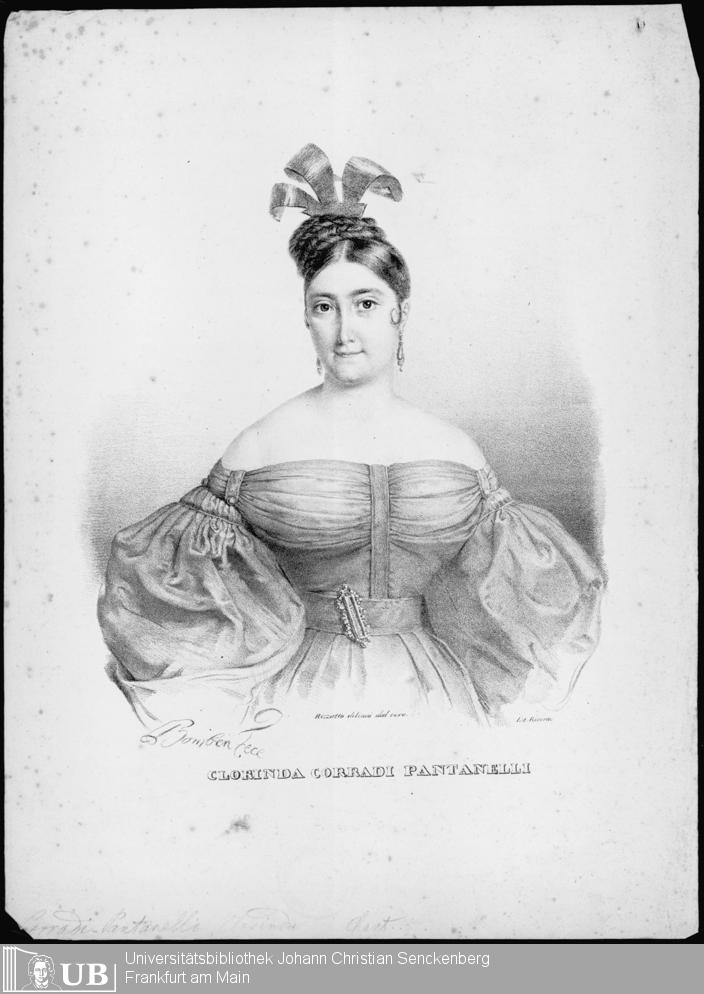
Clorinda Corradi

Clorinda Corradi (November 27, 1804 – June 29, 1877) was an Italian opera singer and one of the most famous contraltos in history.

== Life ==
Clorinda Corradi Pantanelli was born in Urbino, Italy. She was the daughter of a nobleman, Filippo Corradi, and countess Vittoria Peroli. Corradi received her musical education in Urbino. Initially, her father enrolled her at the Cappella Musicale di Urbino under the direction of music teacher and composer Filippo Celli. Clorinda was obliged to make a living by singing because of the family's economic situation. She began her career at the Recanati theatre in 1823 with the Rossini's operas L'Italiana in Algeri and La Cenerentola and was received well by audiences and critics. Between 1823 and 1835 she gave a series of performances in the most famous Italian theatres (La Scala, Milan; Teatro Comunale, Bologna; La Fenice, Venice; Teatro Comunale, Ravenna; La Pergola, Florence; Teatro San Carlo, Naples; etc.). In Europe, Corradi sang in Spain (Barcelona, Seville). Clorinda also sang the trouser role of Luigi at the premiere of Donizetti's Ugo, conte di Parigi at La Scala Theatre in Milan.

In 1823 Clorinda married Raffaele Pantanelli from Jesi in Italy. They had one daughter, Alaide, and one son, Romeo. Alaide became a dramatic actress. Both children moved to Chile between 1835 and 1847 with their parents. In 1831, Clorinda was elected as an honorary member of Accademia Veneziana. In October 1835, with the help of her agent and husband Raffaele Pantanelli, she went to La Habana, Cuba, with her brother Nestore Corradi and, on November 14, 1836 she made her debut in a new production of Francesco Morlacchi's Tebaldo ed Isolina. On November 20, 1839 Clorinda debuted in the Tacon Theatre (Great Theatre of Havana). She toured South America extensively, and frequently sang tenor leads.

In April–July 1837 and March–April 1842, Clorinda and members of the Lyrical Company went to New Orleans to give a series of performances at the Theatre d'Orleans and St. Charles Theatre.

On September 2, 1840, Clorinda debuted in Lima, Peru with Giulietta e Romeo and, together and the Lyrical Company she remained in Peru until 1843. The last performance in Lima was on September 2, 1843. In 1844, the Lyrical Company moved to Santiago, Chile. On April 2, 1844 they gave I Capuleti e i Montecchi at Santiago University Theatre. On December 16, 1844 Clorinda inaugurated the new famous Victory Theatre in Valparaíso with Nicola Vaccai's Giulietta e Romeo. She remained in Valparaíso until February 28, 1847 (last performance: Elisa e Claudio). Between 1847 and 1856, critical reviews of the Lyrical Company are limited to performances in Santiago except for some brief references to those in other provincial cities such as Valparaíso. For the most part, reviews deal with the Italian opera company managed by Rafael and Clorinda which included the soprano Teresa Rossi, the tenor Juan Ubaldi and the baritone Luis Cavedagni in operas by Donizetti, Verdi, Rossini and Mercadante.

In March 1861, Clorinda was named teacher of Santiago Conservatory. She retired on December 20, 1876 and died in 1877 in Santiago at age 72.

During her life Clorinda gave hundreds of performances of Vincenzo Bellini, Saverio Mercadante, Donizetti, Verdi, Carlo Coccia, Nicola Vaccai and Gioacchino Rossini.

== Cultural references ==
Clorinda Corradi was portrayed by Raymond Monvoisin in 1845 (Museo Historico National, Santiago) and in 1842 by Clara Filleul (Museo Nacional de Bellas Artes, Santiago).

== Sources ==
- P. Ciarlantini, Il percorso biografico-artistico di Clorinda Corradi Pantanelli, "musa" di Carlo Leopardi.
- Italiana in Algeri, A. Anelli, compositore G. Rossini. Teatro de' Condomini di Recanati, Carnevale 1823. Presso Biblioteca privata Leopardi, coll. Al. c. 120 n.12.
- G. Radiciotti - G. Spadoni, "Clorinda Corradi" in Dizionario dei musicisti marchigiani, RAD 1059 - 1066. Presso Biblioteca Comunale "Mozzi - Borgetti", Macerata.
- G. Natali, "Clorinda Corradi", in Dizionario dei marchigiani illustri. Biblioteca Comunale "Mozzi - Borgetti", Macerata, Ms 1204.
- L. Lianovosani, La Fenice (1792 - 1876), Milan, Italy, Ricordi 1876, pp. 22 – 23.
- G. Piergili, Lettere scritte a Giacomo Leopardi dai suoi parenti con giunta di cose inedite o rare, Florence, Italy, Le Monnier 1878, pp. 83 – 84.
- G. Radiciotti, Contributi alla storia del teatro e della musica in Urbino, Pesaro, Italy Tip. Nobili 1899, pp. 12–15.
- Teatro, musica e musicisti in Recanati, Recanati, Italy, Tip. Simboli 1904, pp. 51–55
- U. Manferrari, Dizionario Universale delle Opere Melodrammatiche, Florence, Sansoni Antiquariato 1954 -1955, 3 voll.: I, p. 73.
- P. Cambiasi, Rappresentazioni date nei reali teatri di Milano (1778 - 1872), Bologna, Italy, Forni 1969 (ristampa anastatica del 1872).
- I. Allodi, I teatri di Parma dal"Farnese" al "Regio", Milan, Nuove Edizioni Milano 1969.
- G. Tintori, Duecento anni di Teatro alla Scala (opere, balletti, concerti 1778 - 1977), Gorle, Gutenberg 1979, p. 25.
- M. De Angelis, Leopardi e la musica, Milan, Italy, Ricordi - Unicopli 1987, pp. 86 – 87, n. 35.
- P. Fabbri and R. Verti, Due secoli di teatro per musica a Reggio Emilia. Repertorio cronologico delle opere e dei balli 1645 - 1857, Reggio Emilia, Italy, Edizioni del Teatro Municipale Valli 1987, pp. 224 – 225.
- W. Ashbrook, Donizetti - La vita, Turin, E.D.T. 1986, pp. 64 – 65.
- Donizetti - Le opere, Turin, Italy, E.D.T. 1987, p. 103.
- P. Ciarlantini, "Il fondo musicale della Biblioteca Leopardi di Recanati", in Il Casanostra- Strenna Recanatese n.100 (1989–1990), pp. 91 – 103: p. 96.
- Biblioteca del Conservatorio di San Pietro a Majella di Napoli. Catalogo dei libretti per musica dell'Ottocento (1800- 1860), edited by F. Melisi, Lucca, Italy, Libreria Musicale Italiana, 1990, nn. 210, 237, 501, 531, 1243, 1244, 1525, 2151, 2246.
- P. Leopardi, Io voglio il biancospino. Lettere 1829 - 1869, edited by M. Ragghianti, Milan, Archinto 1990, pp. 50 – 51.
- E. Comuzio, Il Teatro Donizetti - Cronologia, Bergamo, Italy, Lucchetti 1990.
- U. Gironacci, M. Salvarani, Guida al Dizionario dei Musicisti Marchigiani di Giuseppe Radiciotti e Giovanni Spadoni, Ancona, Italy, Editori delle Marche 1993, p. 107.
- G. Fanan, Drammaturgia rossiniana. Bibliografia dei libretti d'opera, di oratori, cantate ecc. posti in musica da Gioachino Rossini, Rome, Italy, Istituto di Bibliografia Musicale 1997, nn. 32, 120, 264, 327, 444, 549, 561, 773, 1158, 1356, 1364–1366.
- G. Leopardi, Epistolario, edited by F. Brioschi and P. Landi, Turin, Bollati Boringhieri 1998, I, lettere nn. 471, 493, 501, 507, 514, 516.
- F. Gatti, "Cronologia degli spettacoli del Teatro Concordia (1798 - 1883)" in Le stagioni del Teatro Pergolesi 1798 / 1998, Iesi, Italy, Comune di Iesi 1998, II, pp. 88 – 93.
- Dizionario Enciclopedico Universale della Musica e dei Musicisti-I titoli e i personaggi, Turin, Italy, U.T.E.T. 1999, 3 vols.
- P. Ciarlantini, "Clorinda Corradi Pantanelli" in Microcosmi leopardiani: biografie, cultura e società, edited by Alfredo Luzi, Fossombrone, Italy, Metauro Edizioni 2000, pp. 299–311.
- G. Moroni, Teatro in musica a Senigallia, rome, Palombi 2001.
- P. Ciarlantini, "Compositori, impresari, primedonne: i protagonisti marchigiani del teatro musicale in epoca preverdiana", in Quei monti azzurri. Le Marche di Leopardi, edited by Ermanno Carini, Paola Magnarelli and Sergio Sconocchia, Venice, Italy, Marsilio 2002, pp. 711–730.
