= Gran Duo Concertante =

19th-century composition by Giovanni Bottesini

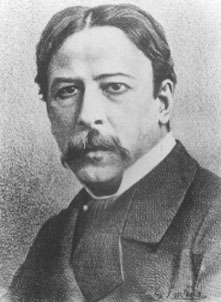
Giovanni Bottesini

The Gran Duo Concertante for two double basses and orchestra was composed by the Italian double bass virtuoso Giovanni Bottesini. The piece was premiered in Venice in 1844 by Bottesini and Giovanni Arpesani. Arpesani and Bottesini were both former students at the Milan Conservatory and at the time both were playing principal bass at Venetian opera houses, Bottesini at the Teatro San Benedetto and Arpesani at Teatro La Fenice.

The Gran Duo Concertante is in three main sections performed without a break and usually lasts around 15 minutes if played up to tempo, but this estimate can vary greatly due to the artists' interpretation of the music. Double concertos were generally composed for different instruments, and Bottesini soon adapted the piece as a duo with violin which he performed in Italy with the violinist Luigi Arditi in the mid-1840s. The pair then moved to Havana, Cuba and performed the Gran Duo many times in the Americas, sometimes using the titles “La Fiesta de los Gitanos” or “The Feast of the Bohemians”. In the 1850s Camillo Sivori, the disciple of Niccolò Paganini, performed the piece with Bottesini many times in London and other European cities and is sometimes wrongly credited with making the arrangement. A manuscript copy of the piece that is probably the version played by Sivori exists in the library of the Royal Academy of Music, but the version most commonly heard today is that printed by Richault in 1879 with a much more elaborate violin part edited by Henryk Wieniawski.

Bottesini performed the Grand Duo throughout his life with many of the world’s greatest violinists, including not only Arditi, Sivori and Wieniawski, but also Jean-Delphin Alard, Henri Vieuxtemps, Prosper Sainton, Émile Sauret, Antonio Bazzini, Achille Simonetti and many others.

Bottesini also wrote another concerto for two double basses entitled "Gran Duo Passione Amorosa" in a more traditional, three-movement format.
