= Giovanni Bottesini =

Italian composer

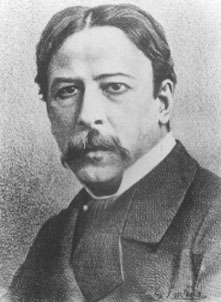
Giovanni Bottesini

Giovanni Bottesini (22 December 1821 – 7 July 1889) was an Italian Romantic composer, conductor, and a double bass virtuoso.

== Biography ==
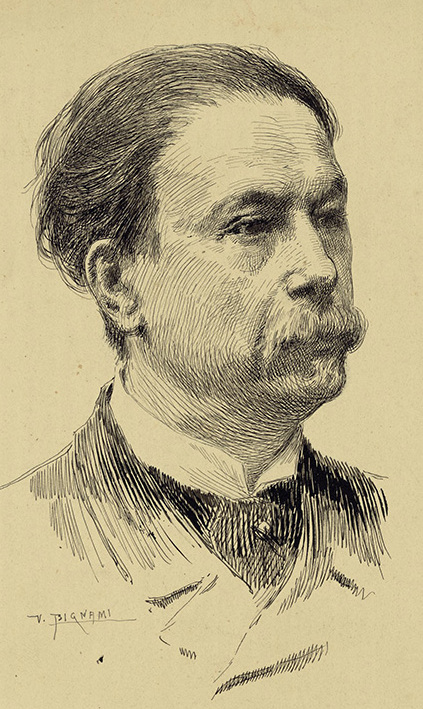
Portrait of Giovanni Bottesini by Vespasiano Bignami

Born in Crema, Lombardy, he was taught the rudiments of music by his father, an accomplished clarinetist and composer, at a young age and had played timpani in Crema with the Teatro Sociale before the age of eleven. He studied violin with Carlo Cogliati, and probably would have continued on this instrument except for a unique turn of events. His father sought a place for him in the Milan Conservatory in 1835, but due to the Bottesini family's lack of money, Bottesini needed a scholarship. Only two positions were available: double bass and bassoon. He prepared a successful audition for the double bass scholarship in a matter of weeks. Only four years later, a surprisingly short time by the standards of the day, he left with a prize of 300 francs for solo playing. This money financed the acquisition of an instrument of Carlo Giuseppe Testore, and a globe-trotting career as "the Paganini of the Double Bass" was launched.

On leaving Milan, he spent some time in America and also occupied the position of principal double-bass in the Italian opera at Havana, where he later became director. Here his first opera, Cristoforo Colombo, was produced in 1847. In 1849 he made his first appearance in England, playing double bass solos at one of the Musical Union concerts. After this he made frequent visits to England, and his extraordinary command of his unwieldy instrument gained him great popularity in London and the provinces.

Apart from his triumphs as a performer, Bottesini was a conductor of European reputation, and was conductor at the Théâtre des Italiens in Paris from 1855 to 1857 where his second opera, L'Assedio di Firenze, was produced in 1856. In 1861 and 1862 he conducted in Palermo, supervising the production of his opera Marion Delorme in 1862, and in 1863 in Barcelona. During these years he diversified the toils of conducting by repeated concert tours through Europe. In 1871 he conducted a season of Italian opera at the Lyceum theatre in London, during which his opera Ali Babà was produced, and he was chosen by Verdi to conduct the first performance of Aida, which took place at Cairo on 24 December 1871.

During this period it was common to programme concerts between the acts of operas. Bottesini would frequently perform solos and duos in these concerts and they were very popular. His fantasies on Lucia di Lammermoor, I puritani, Beatrice di Tenda and especially La sonnambula are virtuosic tours de force that are still popular with those who are highly accomplished on the instrument.

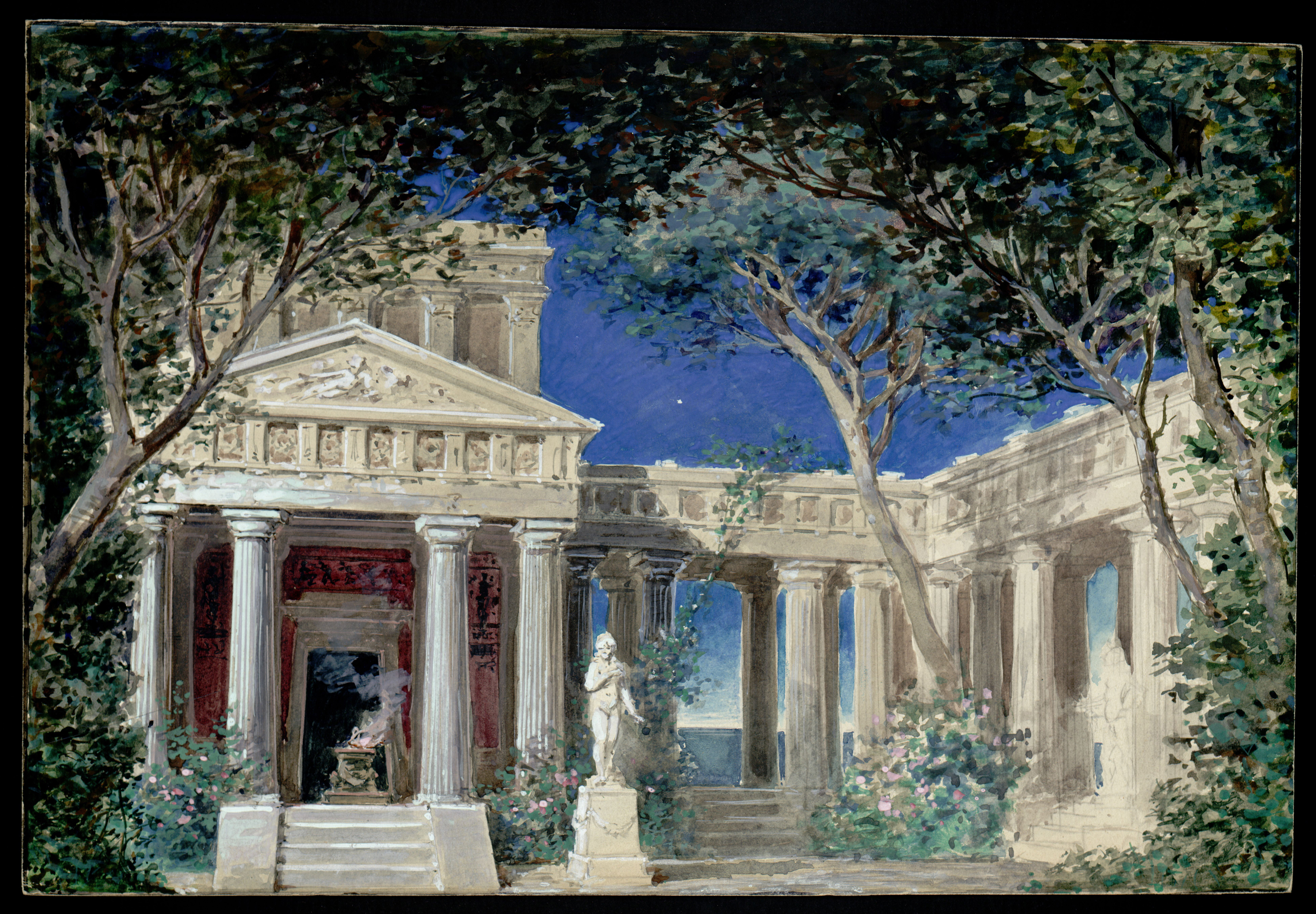
Venere's Temple, set design for Ero e Leandro act 1 (1879).

Bottesini wrote three operas besides those previously mentioned: Il Diavolo della Notte (Milan, 1859); Vinciguerra (Paris, 1870); and Ero e Leandro (Turin, 1880), the last named to a libretto by Arrigo Boito, which was subsequently set by Luigi Mancinelli. He also wrote The Garden of Olivet, a devotional oratorio (libretto by Joseph Bennett), which was produced at the Norwich festival in 1887, eleven string quartets, a quintet for string quartet and double bass, and many works for the double bass, including two concertos for solo double bass, the Gran Duo Concertante (originally) for two double basses, Passione Amorosa for two double basses, numerous pieces for double bass and piano, and an instructional book ("Complete Method for Double Bass").

Shortly before his death, in 1888 he was appointed director of Parma Conservatory on Verdi's recommendation. Bottesini died in Parma on 7 July 1889. His solo works remain standard repertoire for accomplished double bassists to this day. Bottesini was a freemason, initiated 20 June 1849, in the Bank of England Lodge No. 263, London.

== Personal life ==
Bottesini married twice. Firstly, on 23 August 1849 he married the Italian dancer Teresa Revelani at the Sardinian Chapel in London. Secondly, on 14 October 1878, after a 26 year long relationship, he married the Anglo-Spanish opera singer Claudina Fiorentini whose real name was Florentine Williams. Together they had one adopted daughter, Provvidenza.

== The Paganini of the double bass ==
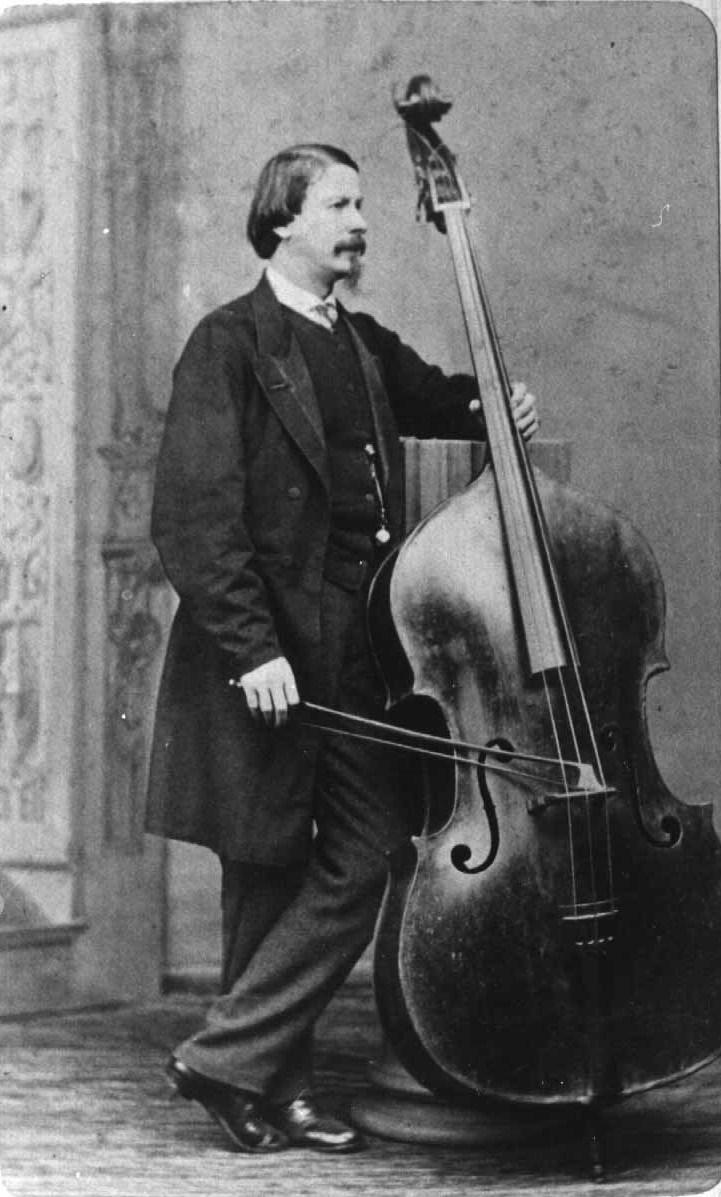
Bottesini with his Testore bass around 1865

Giovanni Bottesini was widely acclaimed, and his virtuosic skill on the double bass has often been compared to that of Niccolò Paganini on the violin. Owing to the contributions of Bottesini, as well as Johannes Matthias Sperger and Domenico Dragonetti, the double bass came to be increasingly regarded as a versatile and expressive instrument.

Bottesini's bass was said to be a unique instrument with a remarkable sound. It was built by Carlo Antonio Testore in 1716. The instrument was owned by several unknown bass players. It nearly met its end in the 1830s as it sat backstage in a marionette theater in Milan. Bottesini purchased the Testore in 1838 for 900 lire. The Testore bass was later converted back to a four-stringed instrument, and then to a three. Eventually, it was changed back to a four-string configuration and is now in the possession of a private collector in Japan.

== List of selected works ==
=== Selected works for solo double bass ===
- Adagio melanconico e appassionato
- Allegretto Capriccio "Alla Chopin"
- Allegro di Concerto "Alla Mendelssohn" (aka "Gran Allegro")
- Capriccio Di Bravura
- Concerto Di Bravura No.1 [Concerto No.1] (1840)
- Concerto/Concertino No. 2 in B minor for double bass and orchestra [Concerto No.2] (1853)
- Concerto in F♯ minor [Concerto No.3] (1871) for double bass and orchestra. Accidentally miscredited or published as concerto No.1 (also known as Concerto for Students in some publications/arrangements/lower transpositions, studienkonzert in German publications)
- Gran Duo Concertante
- Gran Duo for clarinet in A and bass and orchestra
- Duo for cello and double bass – Rossini
- Elegia in re no. 1
- Elegia No. 2, "Romanza Drammatica"
- Elegia No. 3, "Romanza Patetica"
- Fantasia sulla "Beatrice di Tenda" di Bellini
- Fantasia sulla "Cerrito"
- Fantasia sulla "La Sonnambula" di Bellini
- Fantasia sulla "Norma" di Bellini
- Fantasia sulla "Straniera" di Bellini
- Fantasia sulla "Lucia de Lammermoor" di Gaetano Donizetti
- Fantasia sulla "I Puritani" di Bellini
- Gran Duo Passione Amorosa per due contrabassi
- Introduzione e Bolero
- Introduzione e Fuge
- Introduzione e Gavotta
- Introduzione e Variazione di "Carnivale di Venezia" di Rossini
- Meditazione (Aria di Bach) (an arrangement of the Air from Bach's Orchestral Suite in D major)
- Melodia No. 1
- Melodia No. 2
- Rêverie (originally for violoncello and orchestra)
- Tarantella in la minore (frequently paired with Elegia No. 1 and referred to as Elegia e Tarantella. Numerous manuscripts by Bottesini himself show that these two pieces were clearly intended to be performed together)
- Tre gran due per contrabassi
- Variazione sulla "Nel cor più non mi sento" di Paisiello

=== Other chamber music ===
- Tutto il mondo serra – soprano, double bass and piano
- Un Bacio solo – soprano, double bass and piano
- Guardami ancor – soprano, double bass and piano
- È il pianto del mio cor – soprano, double bass and piano
- Canta Roberto! – soprano, double bass and piano
- Retourner a la paix des champs – soprano, double bass and piano
- Une bouche Aimée – soprano, double bass and piano
- Duetto – clarinet, double bass and piano
