= 1846 in music =

== Events ==
- June 28 – Adolphe Sax patents the saxophone.
- August 16 – Gioachino Rossini marries artist's model Olympe Pélissier.
- unknown date – Electric spotlighting is used to simulate sunrise in a production of Rossini's opera Moses at the Paris Opera.

== Published popular music ==
- "Lijepa naša domovino" Croatian national anthem m. Josip Runjanin w. Antun Mihanović (written in 1835)
- "The Indian's Prayer" w. Anonymous, m. I.B. Woodbury
- "There's a Good Time Coming" by Stephen Foster
- "Well-A-Day" by George Linley
- "When the Swallows Homeward Fly" w.m. Franz Abt

== Oratorio ==
- César Franck – Ruth
- Felix Mendelssohn – Elijah

== Classical music ==
- Hector Berlioz – La damnation de Faust
- Anton Bruckner
  - Tantum ergo, WAB 41, 42
  - "Ständchen", WAB 84.2
- Frederic Chopin
  - Polonaise-Fantaisie
  - Barcarolle
- Carl Czerny – Impromptu Fugué, Op.776
- Heinrich Wilhelm Ernst – Rondo Papageno, Op.20
- Henry Litolff – Concerto Symphonique No 3 in E-flat, Op. 45 (approximately 1846)
- Fanny Hensel
  - 4 Lieder for Piano, Op.2
  - Allegretto (C♯ minor), H-U 420 (Op.4, No.2)
- Felix Mendelssohn – Lauda Sion, Op. 73
- Jules Perrot – Catarina or La Fille du Bandit (ballet)
- František Škroup – Clarinet Trio, Op.27

== Opera ==
- Julius Benedict – The Crusaders
- Eduard James Loder – The Night Dancers
- Albert Lortzing – Der Waffenschmied
- Johan Peter Emilius Hartmann – Liden Kirsten, Op.44, premiered May 12 in Copenhagen
- Saverio Mercadante – Orazi e Curiazi
- Karel Miry – Wit en zwart (opera in 1 act, with libretto by Hippoliet van Peene, premièred on January 18 in Ghent)
- Franz von Suppé – Poet and Peasant (24 August, Theater an der Wien, Vienna)

== Births ==
- January 2 – Sándor Erkel, Hungarian composer, son of Ferenc Erkel
- February 24 – Luigi Denza, composer (d. 1922)
- February 26 – Amanda Forsberg, Swedish ballerina (date of death unknown)
- February 27 – Joaquín Valverde Durán, flautist, conductor and composer (d. 1910)
- March 7 – Peppino Turco, songwriter (d. 1907)
- March 11 – Constance Bache, composer (died 1903)
- March 29 – Louise Pyk, Swedish opera singer (d. 1929)
- April 2 – Albert Périlhou, organist, pianist and composer (d. 1936)
- April 5 – Arthur Byron, tenor (d. 1890)
- May 2 – Zygmunt Noskowski, conductor and composer (d. 1909)
- May 22 – Francis Hueffer, music critic (d. 1889)
- June 23 – Anton Svendsen, violinist (died 1930)
- July 2 – Rosina Brandram, opera singer and actress (d. 1907)
- July 3 – Achilles Alferaki, composer (died 1919)
- July 22 – Alfred Perceval Graves, lyricist (died 1931)
- July 29 – Sophie Menter, pianist and composer (d. 1918)
- August 17 – Marie Jaëll, composer (died 1925)
- August 24 – Paul Rougnon, pianist and composer (d. 1934)
- September 21
  - Catherine Chislova, ballerina (d. 1889)
  - Juliana Walanika, the "Hawaiian Nightingale", court singer (d. 1931)
- October 20 – Johan Amberg, composer (d. 1928)
- November 2 – Antonio Peña y Goñi, music critic
- November 7 – Ignaz Brüll, pianist and composer (d. 1907)
- November 23 – Ernst von Schuch, conductor (d. 1914)
- November 27 – Ángel Rubio y Laínez, composer (d. 1906)
- December 29 – Rosa Asmundsen, Norwegian singer (d. 1911)
- date unknown
  - José María de Arteaga y Pereira, composer (died 1913)
  - Valentina Serova, composer (d. 1924)

== Deaths ==
- February 3 – Joseph Weigl the younger, composer and conductor (b. 1766)
- February 13 – Johann Bernhard Logier, music teacher (b. 1777)
- February 18
  - William Hawes, choirmaster (b. 1785)
  - Gottlob Schuberth, musician (born 1778)
- February 22 – Carel Anton Fodor, Dutch pianist and conductor (b. 1768)
- April 6 – Domenico Dragonetti, double-bass player (b. 1763)
- April 24 – Girolamo Crescentini, castrato singer (b. 1766)
- July 23 – Christian Heinrich Rinck, organist and composer (b. 1770)
- August 10 – Johann Simon Hermstedt, clarinettist (b. 1778)
- August 27 – Gottfried Wilhelm Fink, music theorist (born 1783)
- September 14 – Carl Almenräder, bassoonist and composer (b. 1786)
- November 1 – Franz Anton Ries, violinist (b. 1755)
- November 30 – Maria Severa Onofriana, Portuguese singer and guitarist, considered the founder of fado (b. 1820)
- December 12 – Eliza Flower, musician and composer (b. 1803)
- December 25 – Swathi Thirunal Rama Varma, Maharajah of Travancore, musician, composer and patron of the arts (b. 1813)
- date unknown
  - Dede Efendi, composer (b. 1778)
  - Mykola Ovsianiko-Kulikovsky, subject of a famous musical hoax
  - Sophie Weber, singer (b. c. 1763)
