= Blenda (disambiguation) =

Blenda is the heroine of a Swedish legend (Blendasägnen) from Småland.

Blenda may also refer to:

- Blenda (name), list of people with the name
- Blenda (opera), 1876 Swedish opera by Per August Ölander
- Blenda, Podlaskie Voivodeship, a village in Poland
- Blenda, a Norwegian laundry product made by Lilleborg (company)
