= The Indian's Prayer =

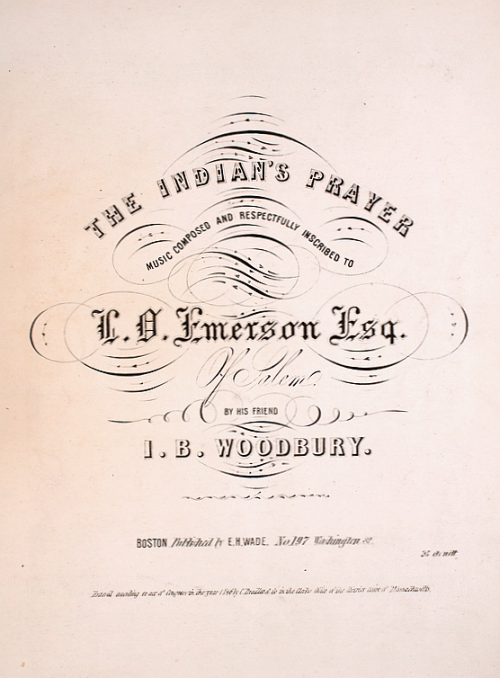
- Cover of sheet music, 1846.

Song
- Language: English
- Written: 1846
- Composer(s): I.B. Woodbury
- Lyricist(s): Anonymous

"The Indian's Prayer" is a popular song with music composed by I.B. Woodbury in 1846. The 1833 original lyric, used in altered form, was published as "The Indian's Entreaty" in a Universalist journal by Rev. John Perry, a Pennsylvania minister. The poem was claimed to reflect the likely thoughts of a boy described as having left (or escaped) "some years ago" from "one of many colleges" to return to his native tribe.

Woodbury, a composer of religious music, dedicated the song to his friend and student L.O. Emerson, Esq.

A setting of the text (similar to Woodbury's version) appears in William Walker's Southern Harmony and Christian Harmony, under the title "The Indian's Petition".

== Lyrics ==
Rev. Perry's original poem, in 11-syllable lines:

Let me go to my home in the far, far west,
To the scenes of my youth, which I love the best.
Where cedars are green, and the bright waters flow,
Where kindred will greet me—white man, let me go.

I long for the spot where the cataract plays,
Where I've sported so free in my infant days,
And the deep forest, too, where with quiver and bow,
I've chas'd the wild deer—Oh! there let me go.

Let me go to the hills and vallies so fair,
Let me breath in freedom my own mountain air;
And to my poor mother whose heart will o'erflow,
When she looks on her boy—to her let me go.

Let me go to my sire, by whose vet'ran side
I have march'd to the fight in my spirits pride;
With him I have conquer'd the insolent foe—
To that Chieftain-father, once more let me go.

And oh! let me go to my dark-eyed maid;
We've climbed o'er the hill-tops, repos'd in the glade,
As the fawn she's gentle, her heart, pure as snow,
And she loves the poor Indian—oh! let me go.

Then let me away to my own forest home,
And ne'er from it again, will I wish to roam—
Oh! there let my ashes in peace be laid low
To my home in the west, white man, let me go.

Disdaining their fetters, the Indians proud soul,
Could not bend in submission, or brook their control—
But free, as the wind, with morning's first dawn,
To his lov'd forest home, the red boy had gone!

The lyrics as they appear in Woodbury's original sheet music: have been altered from the original by an unknown hand, mainly to be in 12-syllable lines rather than 11. Several undated broadsides titled "Indian Hunter" offer variants on these words.

Let me go to my home in the far distant west,
To the scenes of my childhood in innocence blest;
Where the tall cedars wave and the bright waters flow,
Where my fathers repose. Let me go, let me go.
Where my fathers repose. Let me go, let me go.

Let me go to the spot where the cataract plays,
Where oft I have sported in boyhood’s bright days,
And greet my poor mother, whose heart will o’erflow
At the sight of the child. Let me go, let me go.
At the sight of the child. Let me go, let me go.

Let me go to my sire, by whose battlescar’d side,
I have sported so oft in the morn of my pride,
And exulted to conquer the insolent foe,
To my father, the chief, let me go, let me go.
To my father, the chief, let me go, let me go.

And oh! let me go to my flashing eyed maid,
Who taught me to love, ’neath the green willow’s shade,
Whose heart, like the fawn’s, leaps as pure as the snow,
To the bosom it loves. Let me go, let me go.
To the bosom it loves. Let me go, let me go.

And oh! let me go to my wild forest home—
No more from its life-cheering pleasures to roam.
’Neath the groves of the glen, let my ashes lie low—
To my home in the woods, let me go, let me go.
To my home in the woods, let me go, let me go.

== Bibliography ==
- Woodbury, I.B. (m.); Anonymous (w.). "The Indian's Prayer" (Sheet music). Boston: E.H. Wade (1846).
