= Blenda (name) =

Blenda is a unisex given name. It is used as a feminine given name in Sweden, and its origin is not clear. However, it seems to be derived from the Swedish verb blända meaning "to be blinded by the sun." Notable people with the name include:

== Female ==
=== First name ===
- Blenda Björck (1885–1978), Swedish politician
- Blenda Ljungberg (1907–1994), Swedish politician
- Blenda Wilson (born 1941), American university administrator

=== Middle name ===
- Ester Blenda Nordström (1891–1948), Swedish journalist, writer and explorer

== Male ==
- Blenda Gay (1950–1976), murdered American football player
