= Marianna Sankiewicz-Budzyńska =

Polish engineer and academic (1921–2018)

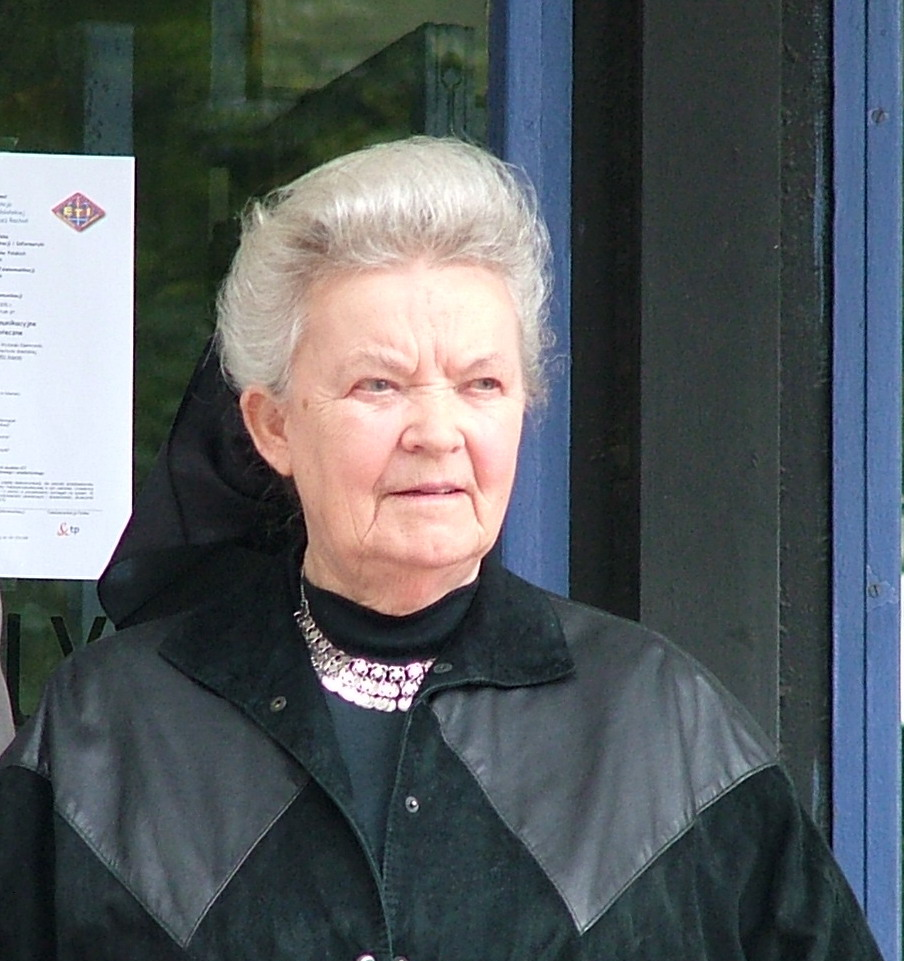
- Sankiewicz in 2005
- Born: Marianna Sankiewicz; 26 September 1921; Przerośl, Poland
- Died: 29 May 2018 (aged 96); Gdańsk, Poland
- Education: Politechnika Gdańska
- Spouse: Gustaw Budzyński

Marianna Sankiewicz-Budzyńska (26 September 1921 – 29 May 2018) was a Polish electronics engineer, academic lecturer, organiser of scientific activities and education.

== Early life ==
Marianna Sankiewicz was born on 26 September 1921 in Przerośl, the daughter of Marianna (née Piszczako) and Kazimierz Sankiewicz (d. 1936) who were managers of the Schroniska nad Wigramia hostel in Wigry National Park. From 1934, she studied at the Maria Konopnicka State High School and Middle School for Girls in Suwałki, where she passed her secondary school-leaving examination in 1939. She was a member of the Polish Scouting Association.

== Second World War ==
The German Invasion of Poland began in September 1939. From June to October 1939, Marianna Sankiewicz lived in Starogard Gdański, then in Vilnius in Lithuania where, from 1941, she worked in a cafe before becoming a soldier with the Home Army in the Vilnius District in 1942.

In June 1942, she was deported to Germany be part of the forced labour under German rule. Sankiewicz worked in Roderbeck (Rynica near Gryfino), Altenweddingen, Pritzwalk, Wanzleben and Szczecin.

During this period, she made contact with the Polish secret prisoner-of-war organisation in Stalag II B Hammerstein, and collected information about the V1 and V2 missile weapons center in Peenemünde. She was arrested in 1944, sent to a concentration camp and interrogated by the Gestapo in a prison in Szczecin but survived the experience.

In 1945, Sankiewicz moved to Gdańsk. From 20 February to August, she was employed at the Polskie Radio, and then at Radio Gdańsk from September 1945, after the end of the Second World War.

== Education and career ==
In October 1945, Marianna Sankiewicz began to study in the radio technology section of the Electric Department of the Politechnika Gdańska (Gdańsk University of Technology). In 1950 she graduated with a master's degree in electrical engineering, specialising in radio technology.

During her time as a university student, she belonged to the Students' Fraternal Aid Society, the Academic Scout Circle "Wodnik" and the Polish Sea Club.

Two years later she started working at the Department of Radio Research Equipment at the Faculty of Communications at Gdańsk University of Technology. She then lectured at the Department of Radiocommunication. In 1968, on the basis of her thesis Opór ujemny opornościowo-stabilny (stable negative resistance), Sankiewicz-Budzyńska was awarded a doctoral degree. Also in 1968, with her husband Gustaw Budzyński, she organised the Electrophonics Laboratory. Because of this work, in 1970 a nationally innovative specialisation in sound engineering was established at the faculty.

During her academic career, she continued to work with Polish Radio and for regional branches of Polish Television (Gdansk, Koszalin, Olsztyn, Szczecin), conducting the first training in sound and acoustics for specialists in the technical and programming departments.

From 1970 she worked as an associate professor. For more than a dozen years she was the deputy dean at the Faculties of Communications and Electronics. In 1981, she was elected vice-rector for education at Gdańsk University of Technology, the first woman at that level in the post-war history of the institution. In 1982 the Department of Sound Engineering at the Faculty of Electronics was created.

Marianna Sankiewicz-Budzyńska specialised in research into electronics and acoustical engineering. She was a member of the Acoustics Committee of the Polish Academy of Sciences. She was also active in the Polish Acoustic Society.

In 1991, she organised the Polish section of the Audio Engineering Society, (AES) of which she became the chairman. In 1995 she was elected vice-president of the society for Central Europe for a two-year term. She initiated the founding of several new AES sections in Belarus, Lithuania, Russia and Ukraine, as well as a new student section in Poland, and increased the activity of the existing Polish AES.

Marianna Sankiewicz-Budzyńska retired in 1992.

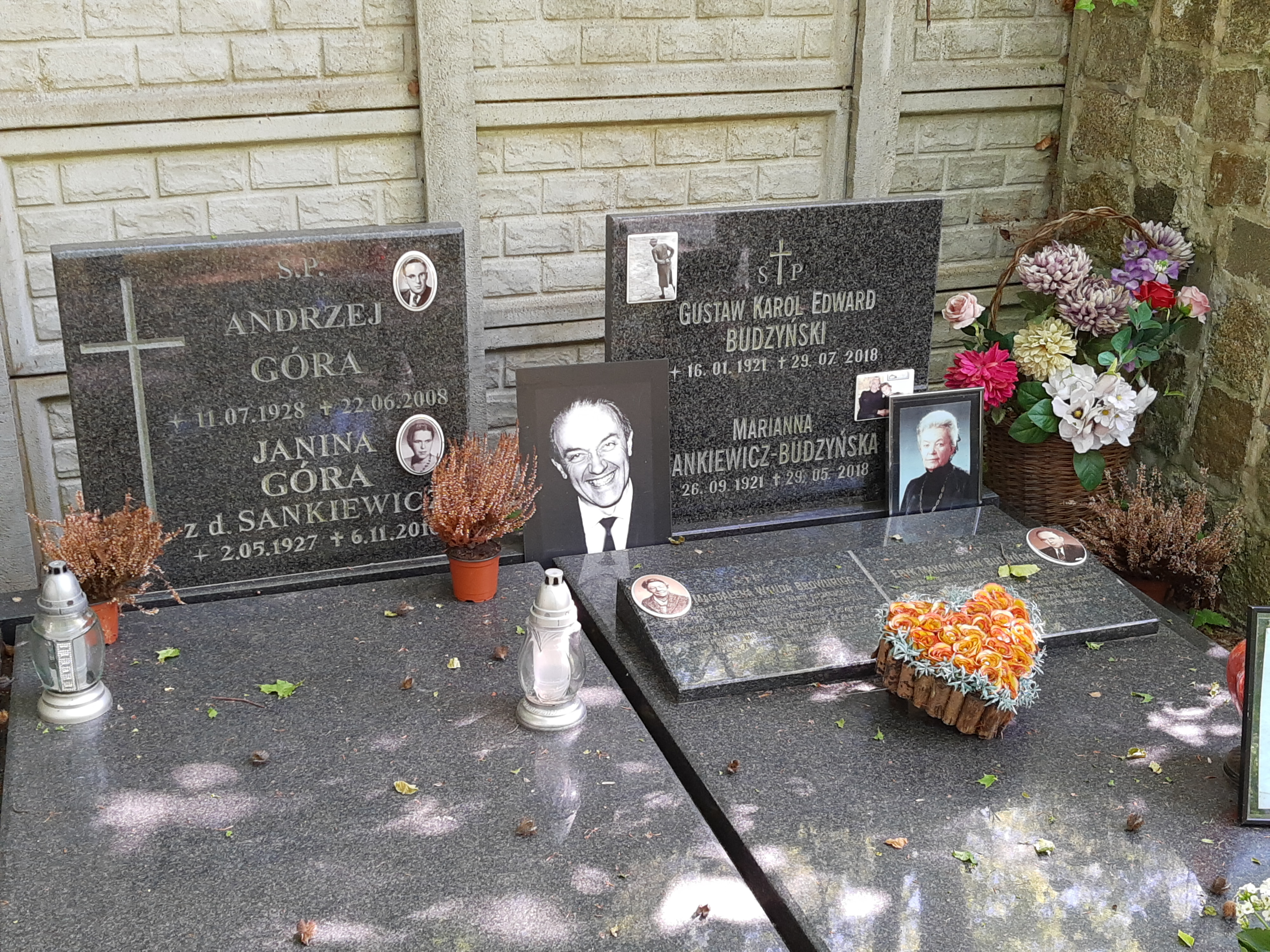
Marianna Sankiewicz-Budzyńska grave at the Srebrzysko Cemetery

== Recognition ==
She was admired and appreciated for her approach to the educational process by her students. During the period of Martial Law in Poland (1981 - 1983) she was involved in helping and supporting students associated with the opposition. In 2011, the memories of her pupils were published Marianna Sankiewicz: dała nam skrzydła..., (Marianna Sankiewicz: She gave us wings ...) which was published by the Gdańsk University of Technology Publishing House.

In 2011, the Polish President Bronisław Komorowski awarded her with the Orderu Odrodzenia Polski the Commander's Cross of the Order of Polonia Restituta.

== Death ==
Marianna Sankiewicz-Budzyńska died on 29 May 2018 in Gdańsk. She is buried with her husband Gustaw Budzyński (1921 - 2018) at the Srebrzysko cemetery in Gdańsk.
