= Hańcza, Podlaskie Voivodeship =

Hańcza
- Village
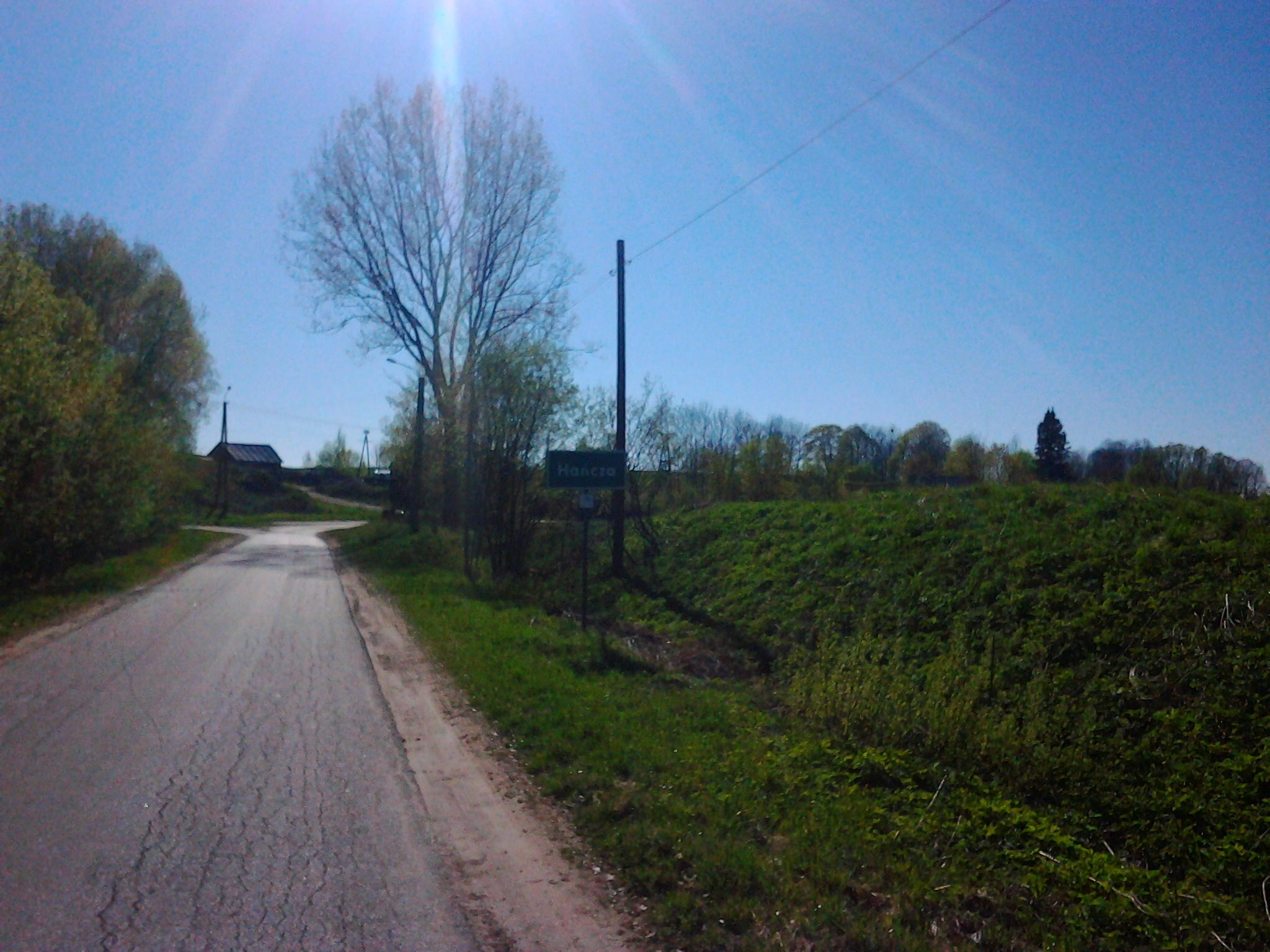

- Location within Poland
- Coordinates: 54°16′N 22°47′E
- Country: Poland
- Voivodeship: Podlaskie
- County: Suwałki
- Gmina: Przerośl

Hańcza [ˈxaɲt͡ʂa] is a village in the administrative district of Gmina Przerośl, within Suwałki County, Podlaskie Voivodeship, in north-eastern Poland.
