= Krzywólka, Gmina Przerośl =

Village in Gmina Przerośl, Poland

Krzywólka
- Village
- Location within Poland
- Coordinates: 54°13′51″N 22°38′37″E
- Country: Poland
- Voivodeship: Podlaskie
- County: Suwałki
- Gmina: Przerośl

Krzywólka [kʂɨˈvulka] is a village in the administrative district of Gmina Przerośl, within Suwałki County, Podlaskie Voivodeship, in north-eastern Poland.
