= Romanówka, Suwałki County =

Romanówka
- Village
- Location within Poland
- Coordinates: 54°13′04″N 22°38′51″E
- Country: Poland
- Voivodeship: Podlaskie
- County: Suwałki
- Gmina: Przerośl

Romanówka [rɔmaˈnufka] is a village in the administrative district of Gmina Przerośl, within Suwałki County, Podlaskie Voivodeship, in north-eastern Poland.
