= Per August Ölander =

Swedish composer

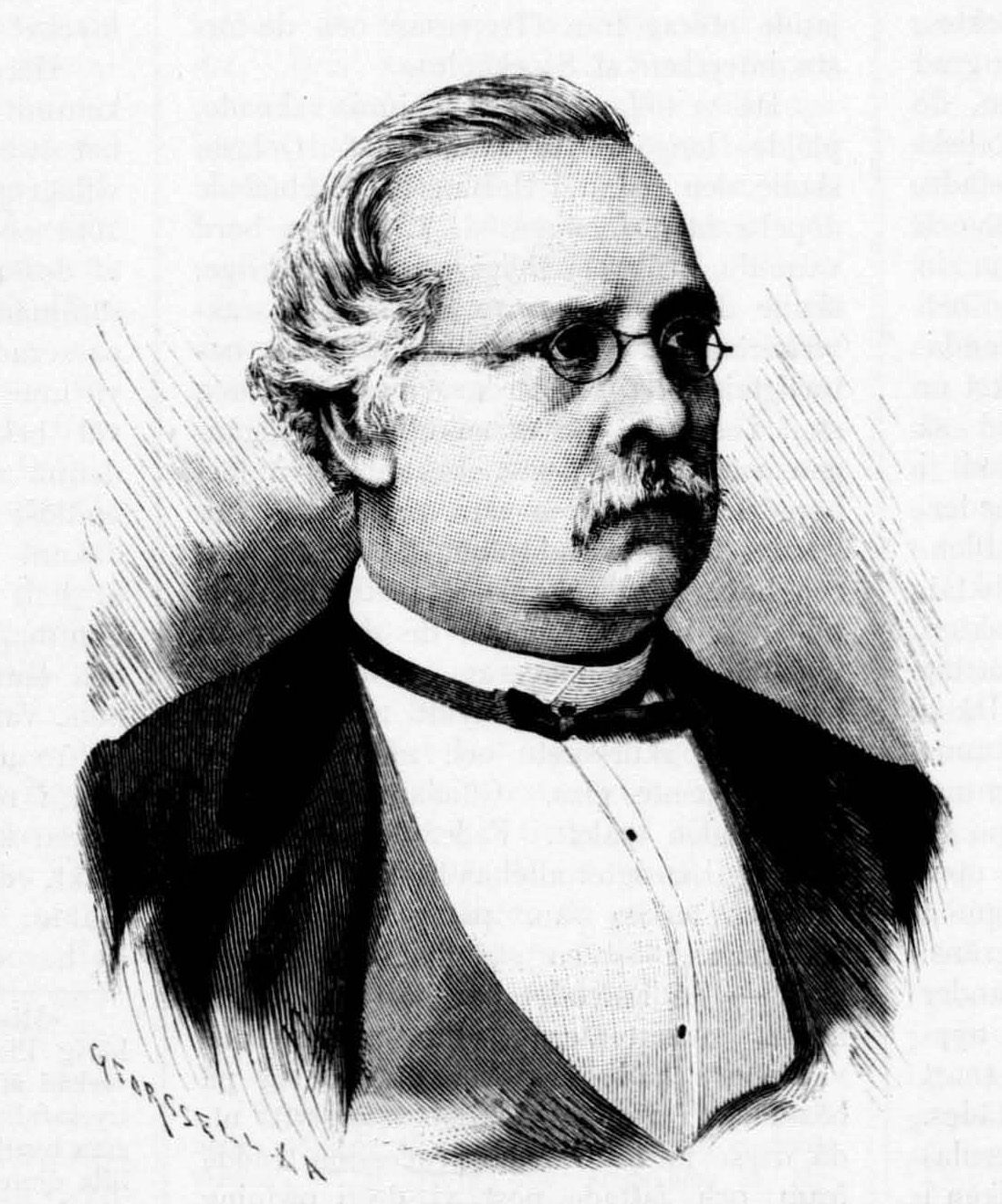
Per August Ölander (1886)

Per August Ölander (1824–1886) was a Swedish composer. He is mainly remembered for his opera Blenda.
