= Łanowicze Duże =

Village in Gmina Przerośl, Poland

- Village
- Location within Poland
- Coordinates: 54°12′38″N 22°43′38″E
- Country: Poland
- Voivodeship: Podlaskie
- County: Suwałki
- Gmina: Przerośl

Łanowicze Duże [wanɔˈvit͡ʂɛ ˈduʐɛ] is a village in the administrative district of Gmina Przerośl, within Suwałki County, Podlaskie Voivodeship, in north-eastern Poland.
