= Bućki =

- Village
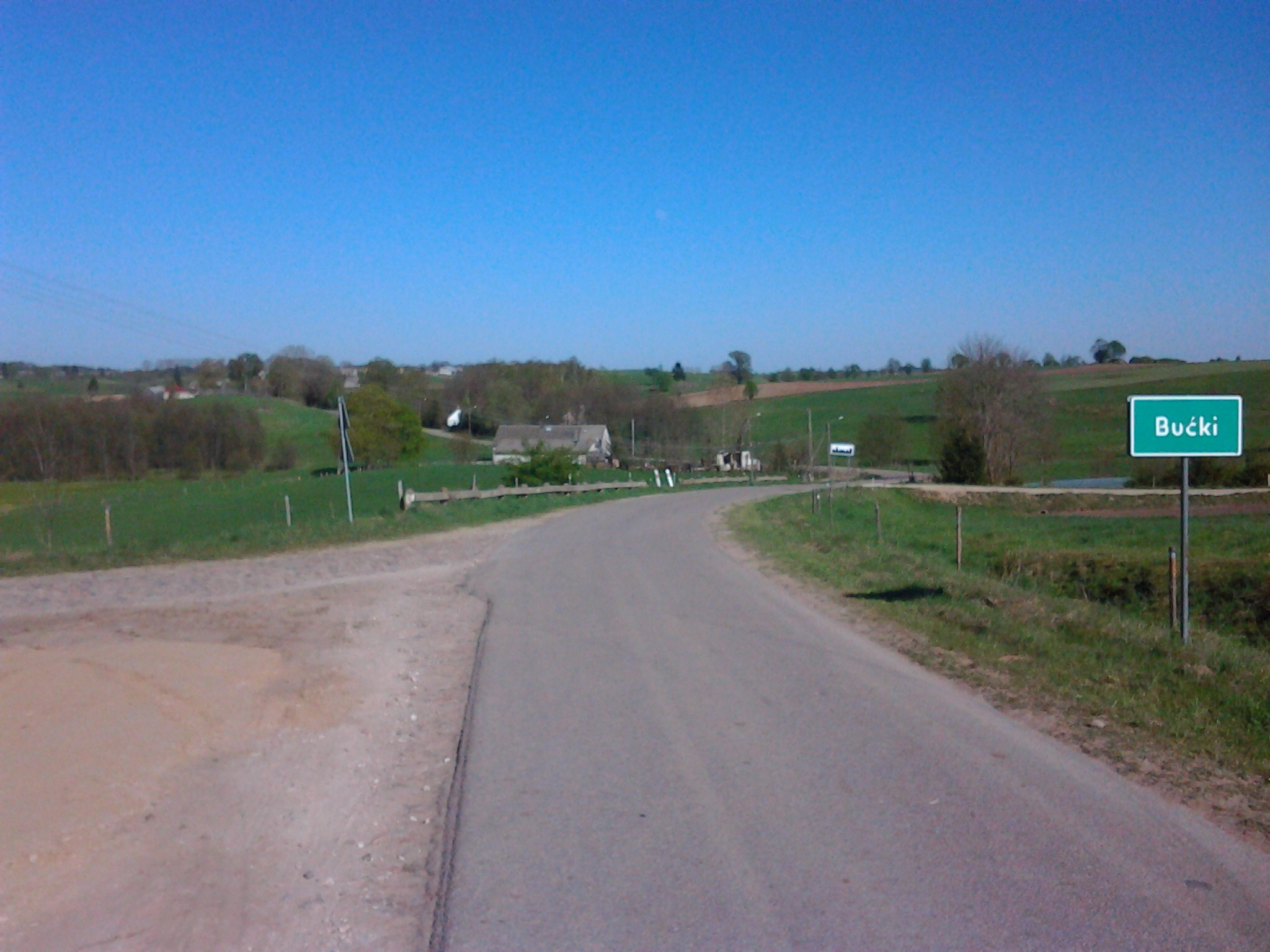

- Location within Poland
- Coordinates: 54°15′42″N 22°45′04″E
- Country: Poland
- Voivodeship: Podlaskie
- County: Suwałki
- Gmina: Przerośl

Bućki [ˈbut͡ɕki] is a village in the administrative district of Gmina Przerośl, within Suwałki County, Podlaskie Voivodeship, in north-eastern Poland.
