= Henry Russell (musician) =

English pianist, baritone singer and composer

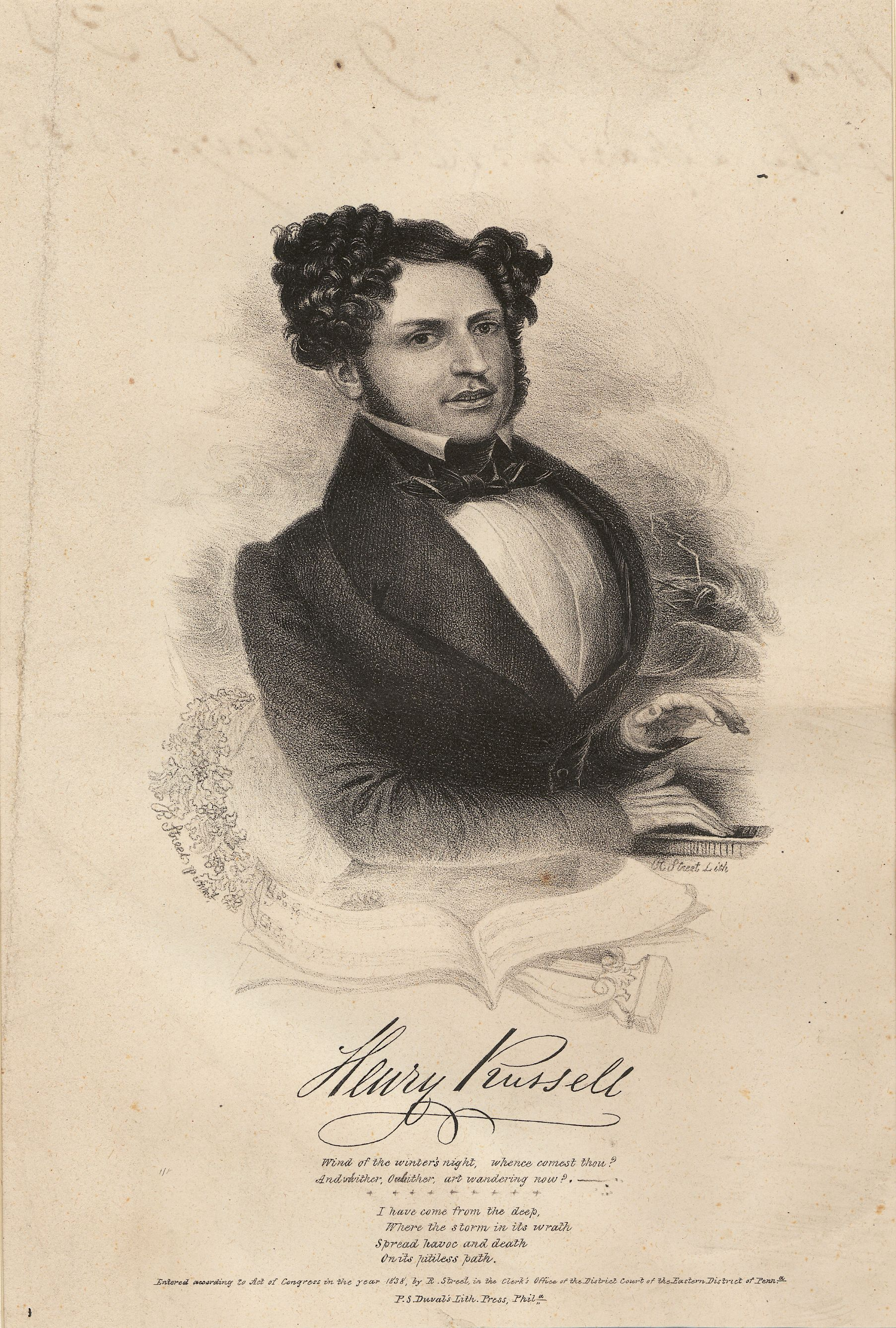
- Born: 24 December 1812; Sheerness
- Died: 8 December 1900 (aged 87); London
- Occupation: Composer

Henry Russell (24 December 1812 or 1813 – 8 December 1900) was an English pianist, baritone singer and composer, born into a distinguished Jewish family.

== Biography ==
Russell's career began in 1836, when at the age of 22 he traveled to the US and, in three seasons, earned no less a sum than £10,000. He subsequently lost this by investing in the United States Bank, which collapsed.

Russell wrote the song "A Life on the Ocean Wave" and the tune to George Pope Morris's poem "Woodman, Spare that Tree" while living in the US from 1836 to 1841, before settling in London to produce musical extravaganzas until he retired in 1857. Many of his songs championed social causes like abolition, temperance, and reform of mental asylums.

Russell was born in Sheerness, Kent, a great-nephew of the British Chief Rabbi Solomon Hirschel. He began his career as a child singer in Elliston's Children's Opera company. While playing the organ at the Presbyterian church in Rochester, New York he discovered that sacred music, played quickly, "makes the best kind of secular music". Old Hundredth, played very fast, became the music for "Get Out of de Way, Ol' Dan Tucker".

Russell's song "The Fine Old English Gentleman" 1831 was parodied ten years later by Charles Dickens in his identically titled song. The two men collaborated on a further two songs: "I Care Not For Spring on His Fickle Wing" from the Posthumous Papers of the Pickwick Club and the Christmas melody "The Ivy Green".

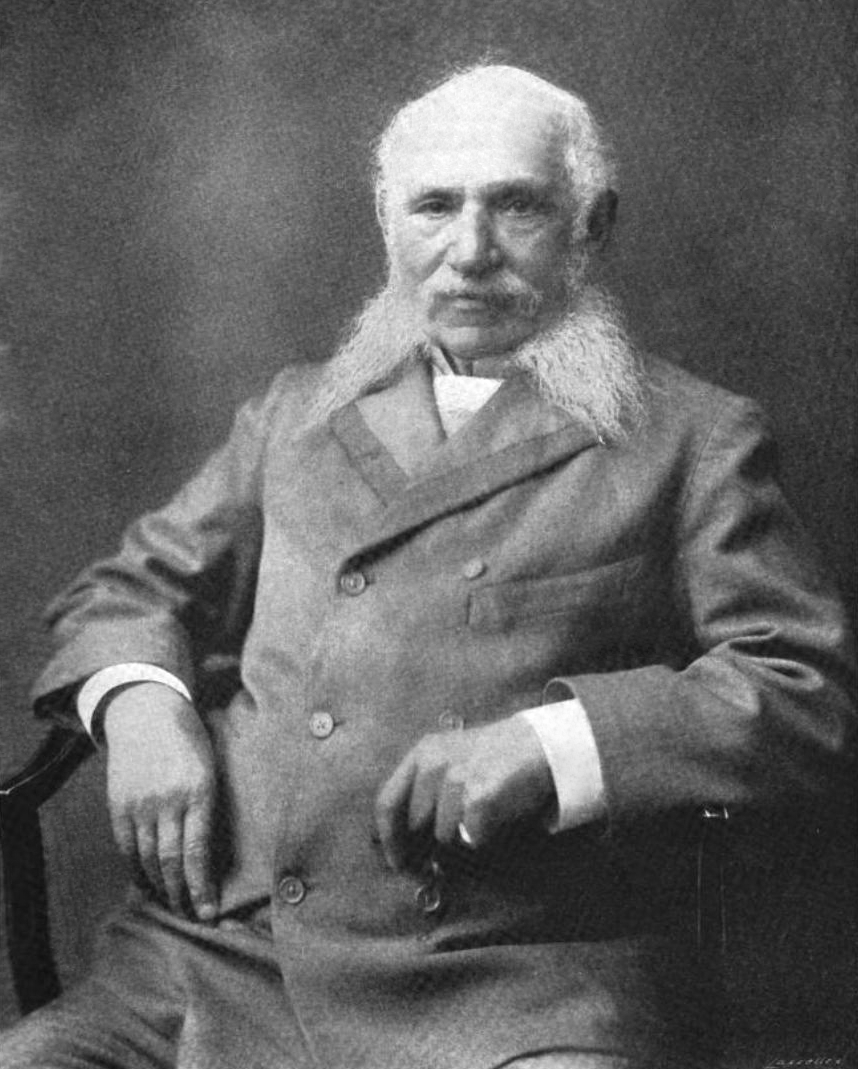
In later life

In 1841, he returned to England and performed at the Hanover Square Rooms in London with instant success. Many of his songs were written to lyrics by Charles Mackay, including "There's a Good Time Coming", "Cheer, Boys, Cheer", and "To the West". The Hutchinson Family Singers were fans of Russell's work and performed several of his tunes, including "The Maniac" and "The Ship on Fire."

After retirement, he lived partly in France, partly in England. His first wife was Christian; his second wife was Jewish and their family (including their sons, conductor Sir Landon Ronald and impresario Henry Russell) were raised in the Jewish religion.

His portrait was painted by the British painter Walter Goodman and displayed in London at the Institute of Oil Painters in 1889 and at the Grafton Galleries in 1897. The Jewish Chronicle of 21 May that year describes the painting as depicting Russell "hale and hearty with flowing beard". He died at 18 Howley Place, Maida Vale, on 8 December 1900, and his remains are interred in Kensal Green Cemetery.

A detailed biography, A Life on the Ocean Wave: The Story of Henry Russell by Andrew Lamb, was published by Fullers Wood Press in 2007.

== Media ==
Woodman! Spare that Tree!
