= Gmina Przerośl =

Gmina Przerośl Przerośl Commune
- Gmina
- Coat of arms

- Gmina Przerośl within the Suwałki County
- Coordinates (Przerośl): 54°15′7″N 22°39′22″E
- Country: Poland
- Voivodeship: Podlaskie
- County: Suwałki County
- Seat: Przerośl

Area
  - Total: 123.84 km^{2} (47.81 sq mi)

Population (2006)
  - Total: 3,095
  - Density: 24.99/km^{2} (64.73/sq mi)
- Website: http://www.przerosl.wojpodlaskie.pl/

Gmina Przerośl (lit. Prieraslio valsčius) is a rural gmina (administrative district) in Suwałki County, Podlaskie Voivodeship, in north-eastern Poland. Its seat is the village of Przerośl, which lies approximately 27 kilometres (17 mi) north-west of Suwałki and 131 km (81 mi) north of the regional capital Białystok.

The gmina covers an area of 123.84 square kilometres (47.8 sq mi), and as of 2006 its total population is 3,095.

The gmina contains part of the protected area called Suwałki Landscape Park.

== Villages ==
Gmina Przerośl contains the villages and settlements of Blenda, Bućki, Hańcza, Iwaniszki, Kolonia Przerośl, Kruszki, Krzywólka, Łanowicze Duże, Łanowicze Małe, Morgi, Nowa Pawłówka, Nowa Przerośl, Olszanka, Prawy Las, Przełomka, Przerośl, Przystajne, Rakówek, Romanówka, Śmieciuchówka, Stara Pawłówka, Wersele, Zarzecze and Zusienko.

== Neighbouring gminas ==
Gmina Przerośl is bordered by the gminas of Dubeninki, Filipów, Jeleniewo, Suwałki and Wiżajny.
