= To the West =

To The West, with words by Charles Mackay and music by Henry Russell, was one of the most popular songs of the mid-nineteenth century in England.

Of the song Russell boasted at the time that it created such a furore at the time of the mass emigrations of the 1840s that it "induced many thousands of people to turn attention to the promises held out by the New World."
