= Przystajne =

- Village
- Location within Poland
- Coordinates: 54°13′N 22°40′E
- Country: Poland
- Voivodeship: Podlaskie
- County: Suwałki
- Gmina: Przerośl

Przystajne [pʂɨsˈtai̯nɛ] is a village in the administrative district of Gmina Przerośl, within Suwałki County, Podlaskie Voivodeship, in north-eastern Poland.
