= Luther Orlando Emerson =

American musician and composer

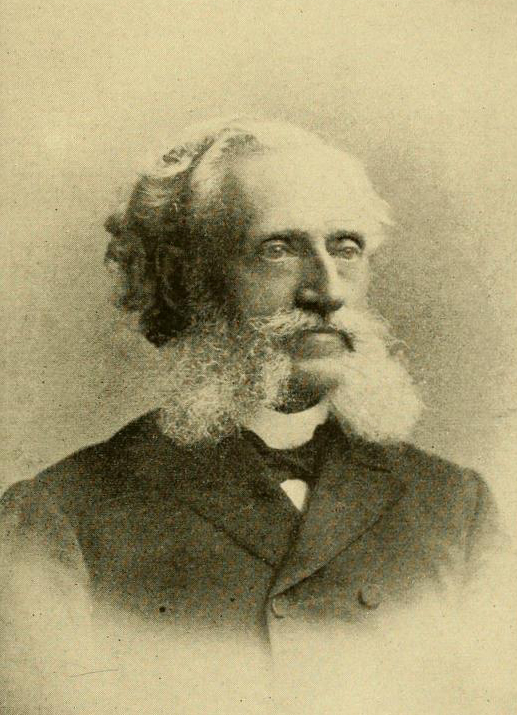
Luther Orlando Emerson

Luther Orlando Emerson (3 August 1820 - 29 September 1915) was an American musician, composer and music publisher.

== Biography ==
Emerson was born in Parsonsfield, Maine, on August 3, 1820, to Luther Emerson and Elizabeth Usher. He attended Parsonsfield Seminary and Effingham Academy, originally planning to be a doctor. Later he studied music under Isaac Woodbury. He taught for eight years in Salem, Massachusetts. He then served as organist and musical director in various churches in Massachusetts, and was the director of about 300 musical festivals and conventions.

Emerson died September 29, 1915, and is buried in the Mount Auburn Cemetery in Cambridge, Massachusetts.

== Works ==
Emerson compiled several collections of church music, including "The Romberg Collection" (1853); "The Golden Wreath" (1857); "The Golden Harp" (1858); "The Sabbath Harmony" (1860); "The Harp of Judah" (1863); "Merry Chimes" (1865); "Jubilate" (1866); "Choral Tribute" (1869); "Emerson's Vocal Melody" "The Voice of Worship" (1879); "Anthems of Praise (1886); and "Jehovah's Praise" (1887).

His "Choral Tribute" volume is credited as one of the books used by George Careless to rehearse the early Tabernacle Choir.
