= Kolonia Przerośl =

- Village
- Location within Poland
- Coordinates: 54°14′43″N 22°40′46″E
- Country: Poland
- Voivodeship: Podlaskie
- County: Suwałki
- Gmina: Przerośl

Kolonia Przerośl [kɔˈlɔɲa ˈpʂɛrɔɕl] is a village in the administrative district of Gmina Przerośl, within Suwałki County, Podlaskie Voivodeship, in north-eastern Poland.
