= Blenda (opera) =

Blenda is a Swedish opera in four acts by Per August Ölander to a libretto by Ernst Wallmark and Ludvig Josephson after the latter's play of the same name.

== History ==
Blenda as a historic character was created in 1691 by mill owner Petter Rudebeck at Huseby mill in Småland in order to preserve the Värendian right of inheritance for women when it was threatened by the state tax commission. According to the Blendasägnen, she gathered an army of women who defeated the Danes while their men were at war in Norway. The librettists Josephson and Wallmark were aware and approved of the relationship with the Virgin of Orleans.

As the story goes, Blenda sacrifices herself after throwing herself between the Danish army leader Nils Dotta and her husband Harald in a battle that concerned both her favor and the honor of the lands.

== People ==
Role	Voice	Premiere cast
Dazzle	Soprano	Louise Pyk
Harald, her betrothed	Tenor	Oscar Arnoldson
Johan, son of King Sverker	Tenor	Harald Torslow
Cardinal Nicolaus Albanensis	Base	Helmer Stromberg
King Sverker of Sweden	Baritone	Sven Lars Wilhelm Lundvik
Nils Dotta, Danish chieftain	Baritone	Robert Ohlsson
King Sven Grate of Denmark	Baritone	Per Janzon
Knight Karl, Danish chieftain	Tenor	Johan Malmsjö
The bishop	Bass	

== See also ==
- Blenda, heroine of a Swedish legend
