= Nowa Pawłówka =

- Village
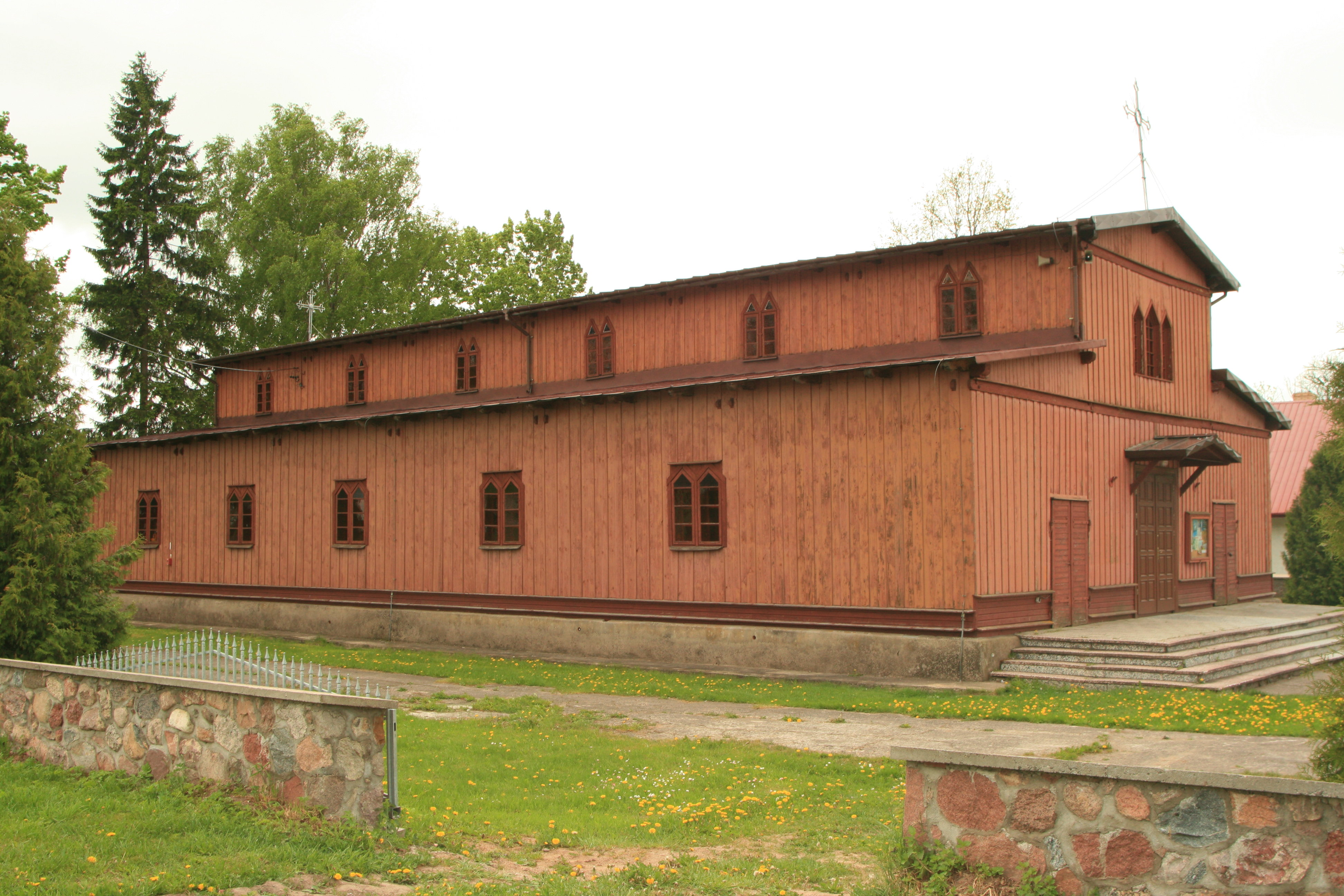
- Church in Nowa Pawłówka

- Location within Poland
- Coordinates: 54°12′37″N 22°46′10″E
- Country: Poland
- Voivodeship: Podlaskie
- County: Suwałki
- Gmina: Przerośl

Nowa Pawłówka [ˈnɔva paˈvwufka] is a village in the administrative district of Gmina Przerośl, within Suwałki County, Podlaskie Voivodeship, in north-eastern Poland.
