= Antonio Peña y Goñi =

Spanish musicologist

- Peña y Goñi, photograph published in the journal Ilustracion Musical Hispanoamericana in 1892
- Born: 2 September 1846; San Sebastián, Gipuzkoa, Spain
- Died: 13 November 1896 (aged 50); Madrid, Spain
- Education: Madrid Conservatory
- Occupations: Music critic; Composer; Musicologist; Academic teacher
- Organizations: La crítica; Madrid Conservatory
- Awards: Order of Isabella the Catholic; Order of Charles III; Cross of Naval Merit

Antonio Peña y Goñi (2 November 1846 – 13 November 1896), was a Spanish music critic, composer, and musicologist. Grove Music Online states that Peña y Goñi was "the founder of modern music criticism in Spain".

== Biography ==
Antonio Peña y Goñi was born in San Sebastián on 2 November 1846. He was initially educated in his native city, and at the at the age of 12 he relocated to France where he attended the Colegio de los Hermanos de María (now known in French as the Collège Sainte Marie) in Saint-Jean-de-Luz. He received his early musical training from the organist and choir master at the San Sebastián Cathedral, José Juan Santesteban, becoming an accomplished pianist. However, his intention was not to become a performer but a musicologist.

Peña y Goñi pursued further studies in music in Paris and Bordeaux, and ultimately at the Madrid Conservatory (then called the Escuela Nacional de Música y Declamación) where he studied harmony. He spent two years at the conservatory where he further developed his skills as a pianist and gained some skills at music composition. He began writing music criticism for El Imparcial in 1868, bringing a new level of expertise and insight into his reviews which substantially departed from previous critics in the Spanish language. He was the first Spanish critic to include in his reviews an assessment of the quality and aesthetics of the works and their interpretation. He is credited with substantially changing the music criticism landscape in his nation, and changing the way Spanish papers broadly covered music.

With Manuel de la Revilla, Peña y Goñi co-founded the periodical La crítica, a weekly literary, music, and culture magazine which published its first issue on 15 October 1874. At this time he was also an employee of Spain's Ministry of Development. After La crítica failed financially, he wrote criticism for a variety of publications, including El Globo, El tiempo, La Correspondencia musica, La Crónica de la Música, La Epoca, La Europa, La Ilustración Española y Americana, Madrid Cómico, and Revista Contemporánea. He also worked as a correspondent for the French publication Le Ménestrel.

In 1879 he was appointed a professor of music history and criticism at the Madrid Conservatory. In 1892 he was elected to the Royal Academy of Fine Arts of San Fernando, an honor he had earlier declined in 1873 feeling he was too young to accept. As a composer he created the symphonic poem Vasconia, the fantasy for orchestra Pan y Toros, and many works for solo piano. His popular patriotic Basque song’ "¡Viva Hernani!" for solo voice, chorus and orchestra premiered at the Teatro Real on 21 December 1875.

As a musicologist Peña y Goñi wrote many pamphlets on composers and their works, most often on operas and opera composers. He wrote a seminal work on zarzuela, La ópera española y la música dramática (1881). It was the first work to examine Spanish opera from the perspective of a musicologist. In general, he was a supporter of both Spanish opera and Richard Wagner, but was critical of the Italian school of opera.

Antonio Peña y Goñi died on 13 November 1896 in Madrid. Honors he was acknowledged with during his lifetime included being named a Commander of the Order of Isabella the Catholic and a Knight of the Order of Charles III. He was also the recipient of the Cross of Naval Merit, and was made an honorary member of the Madrid Concert Society.

== Partial list of works ==
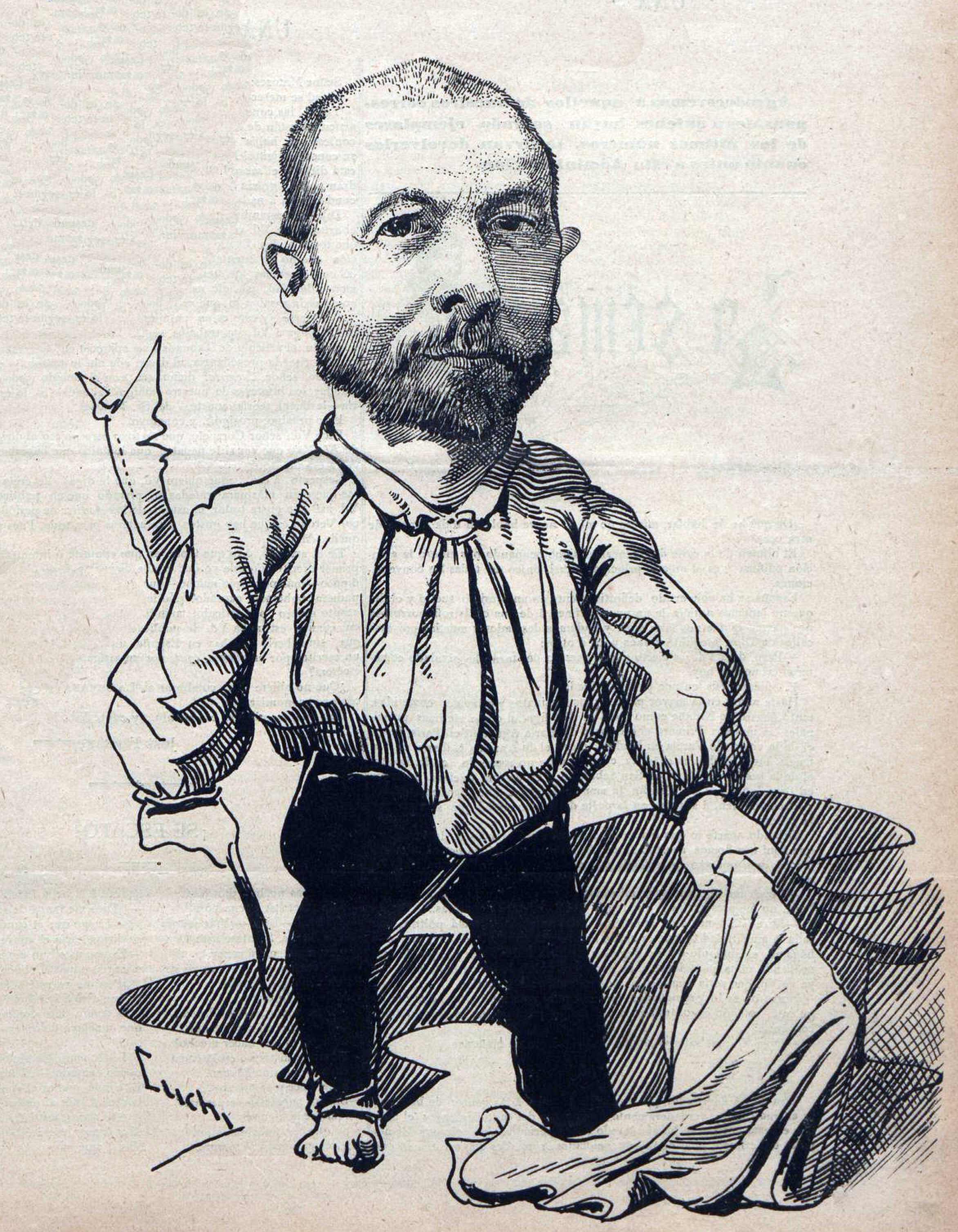
1888 caricature of Antonio Peña y Goñi

=== Writings ===
- La obra maestra de Verdi: Aida, ensayo crítico musical (1875, Madrid)
- Nuestros músicos: Barbieri (1875, Madrid)
- Rienzi (1875, Madrid)
- Impresiones musicales: colección de artículos de crítica y literatura musical (1878, Madrid)
- Impresiones y recuerdos: Carlos Gounod (1879, Madrid)
- "Miguel Marqués y la sinfonía en España". Revista contemporánea (26): 455. 1880.
- La ópera española y la música dramática en España en el siglo XIX (1881, Madrid)
- Arte y patriotismo: Gayarre y Masini (1882, Madrid)
- Cristina Nilsson: discurso biográfico leído en el gran salón teatro de la Escuela nacional de música y declamación en la función celebrada el 26 de diciembre de 1881 para solemnizar la adjudicación del primer premio Nilsson (1882, Madrid)
- "Luis Mancinelli y la Sociedad de conciertos de Madrid". Revista contemporánea (81): 597. 1891. Second part published in no.82 (1891), p. 32
- La ópera cómica española: desde 1838 hasta nuestros días (1892, Madrid)
- Los maestros cantores de Nuremberg de Richard Wagner (1893, Madrid)
- Cajón de sastre (1894, Madrid)
- Contra la ópera española (1885, Madrid)
- Lagartijo y Frascuelo (1887, Madrid)
- Telegramas (1888, Madrid)
- Luis Mancinelli y la Sociedad de Conciertos de Madrid (1891, published by J. M. Ducazcal)
- Los Gnomos de la Alhambra: Proceso de un Jurado (1891, Madrid)
- La pelota y los pelotaris (1892, published by M. G. Hernández)
- De buen humor (1892, Madrid)
- Discursos leídos ante la Real Academia de Bellas Artes de San Fernando en la recepción pública de D. Antonio Peña y Goñi... (1892, Madrid)
- Los Maestros Cantores de Nuremberg de Ricardo Wagner (1893, Madrid)
- Cajón de sastre (1894, Madrid)
- Guerrita (1894, Madrid)
- Cuatro cosas (1895, Madrid)
- Iparraguirre y el árbol de Guernica (1896, Madrid)

=== Music compositions ===
- El sueño de un ángel, romanza for voice and piano (1872)
- Hernani, zortzico (1875)
- ¡Viva Hernani!, zortzico (1875)
- San Sebastián, capricho vascongado (1875)
- Isabel, mazurca for piano (1876)
