= Rakówek, Podlaskie Voivodeship =

Village in Gmina Przerośl, Poland

Rakówek
- Village
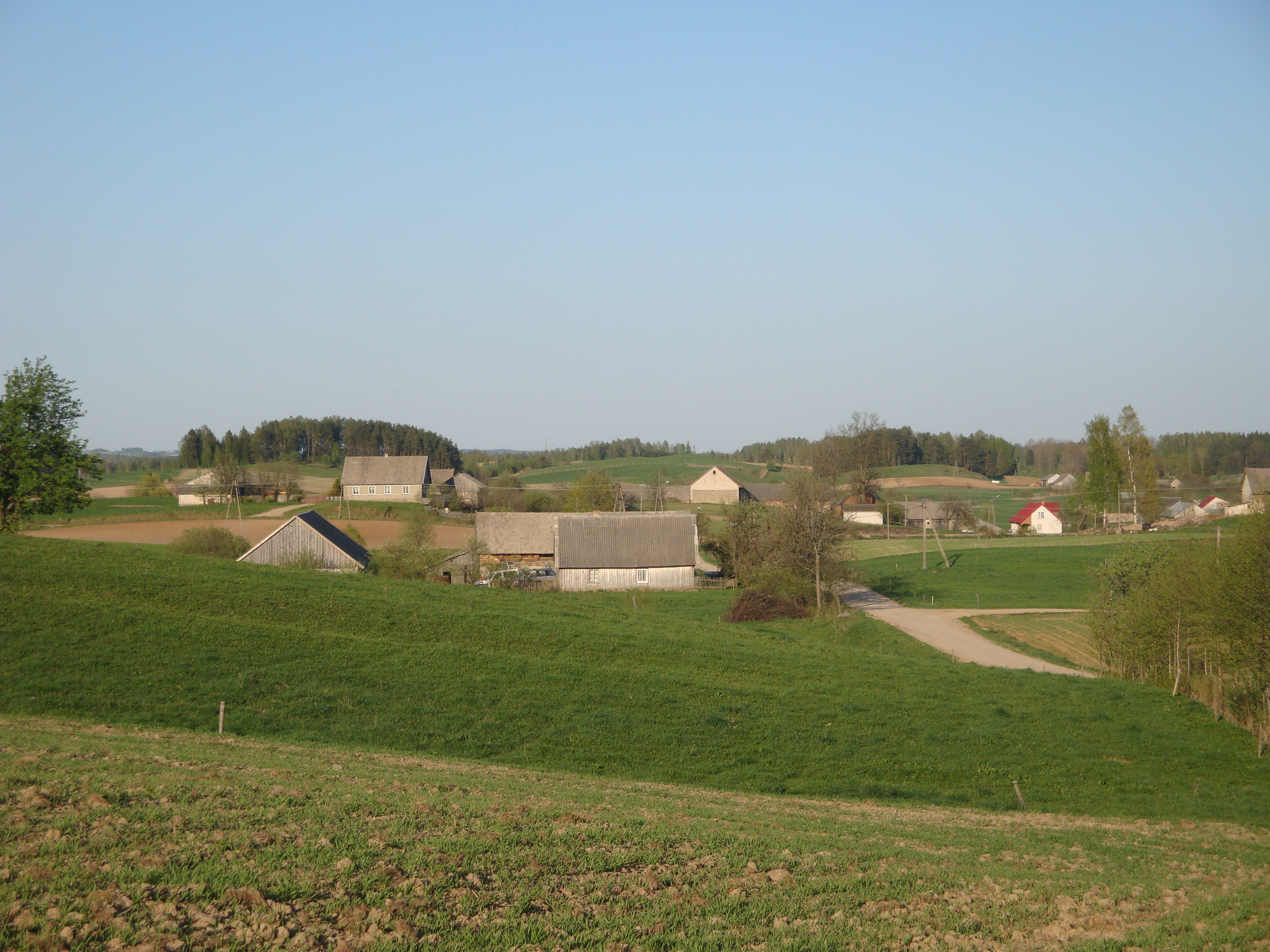

- Location within Poland
- Coordinates: 54°15′00″N 22°35′48″E
- Country: Poland
- Voivodeship: Podlaskie
- County: Suwałki
- Gmina: Przerośl

Rakówek [raˈkuvɛk] is a village in the administrative district of Gmina Przerośl, within Suwałki County, Podlaskie Voivodeship, in north-eastern Poland.
