= Łanowicze Małe =

- Village
- Location within Poland
- Coordinates: 54°13′40″N 22°43′22″E
- Country: Poland
- Voivodeship: Podlaskie
- County: Suwałki
- Gmina: Przerośl

Łanowicze Małe [wanɔˈvit͡ʂɛ ˈmawɛ] is a village in the administrative district of Gmina Przerośl, within Suwałki County, Podlaskie Voivodeship, in north-eastern Poland.
