= Olszanka, Gmina Przerośl =

Olszanka
- Village
- Location within Poland
- Coordinates: 54°13′57″N 22°44′01″E
- Country: Poland
- Voivodeship: Podlaskie
- County: Suwałki
- Gmina: Przerośl

Olszanka [ɔlˈʂaŋka] is a village in the administrative district of Gmina Przerośl, within Suwałki County, Podlaskie Voivodeship, in north-eastern Poland.
