= Blenda Björck =

Swedish politician (1885–1978)

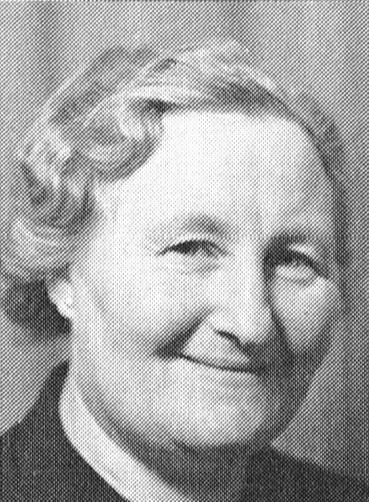
Blenda Björck 1885 SPA (cropped)

Blenda Björck (1885-1978) was a Swedish politician (Swedish Social Democratic Party).

Björck worked as a maidservant in 1899–1908 and in the clothing industry in 1909–1915, until she married a tailor.

Björck was president of the social democratic women's club in Tomelilla in 1919–1937.

Björck was an MP of the Second Chamber of the Parliament of Sweden in 1937–1948. During her tenure as MP, she focused on educational issues.
