= Blenda Ljungberg =

Swedish politician (1907–1994)

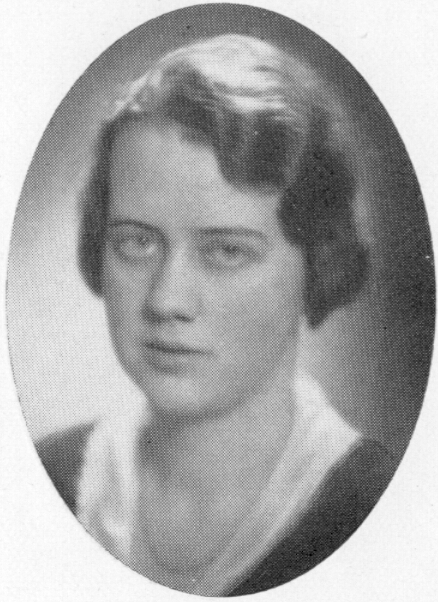
Blenda Ljungberg

Blenda Maria Ljungberg (7 December 1907 – 27 November 1994) was a Swedish politician (Moderate Party).

Ljungberg was born in Enköping. She was a teacher. She was a member of the Uppsala City Council in 1943, and also the first female chairperson of a Swedish city council from 1959 to 1963. She was a member of the Riksdag's Första kammare (Upper Chamber) from 1962 to 1964, the Andra kammare (Lower Chamber) from 1965 to 1970, and the new unicameral Riksdag from 1971 to 1973 for Uppsala. She died in Uppsala in 1994.
