= Revista Contemporánea =

Magazine published 1875–1907 in Spain

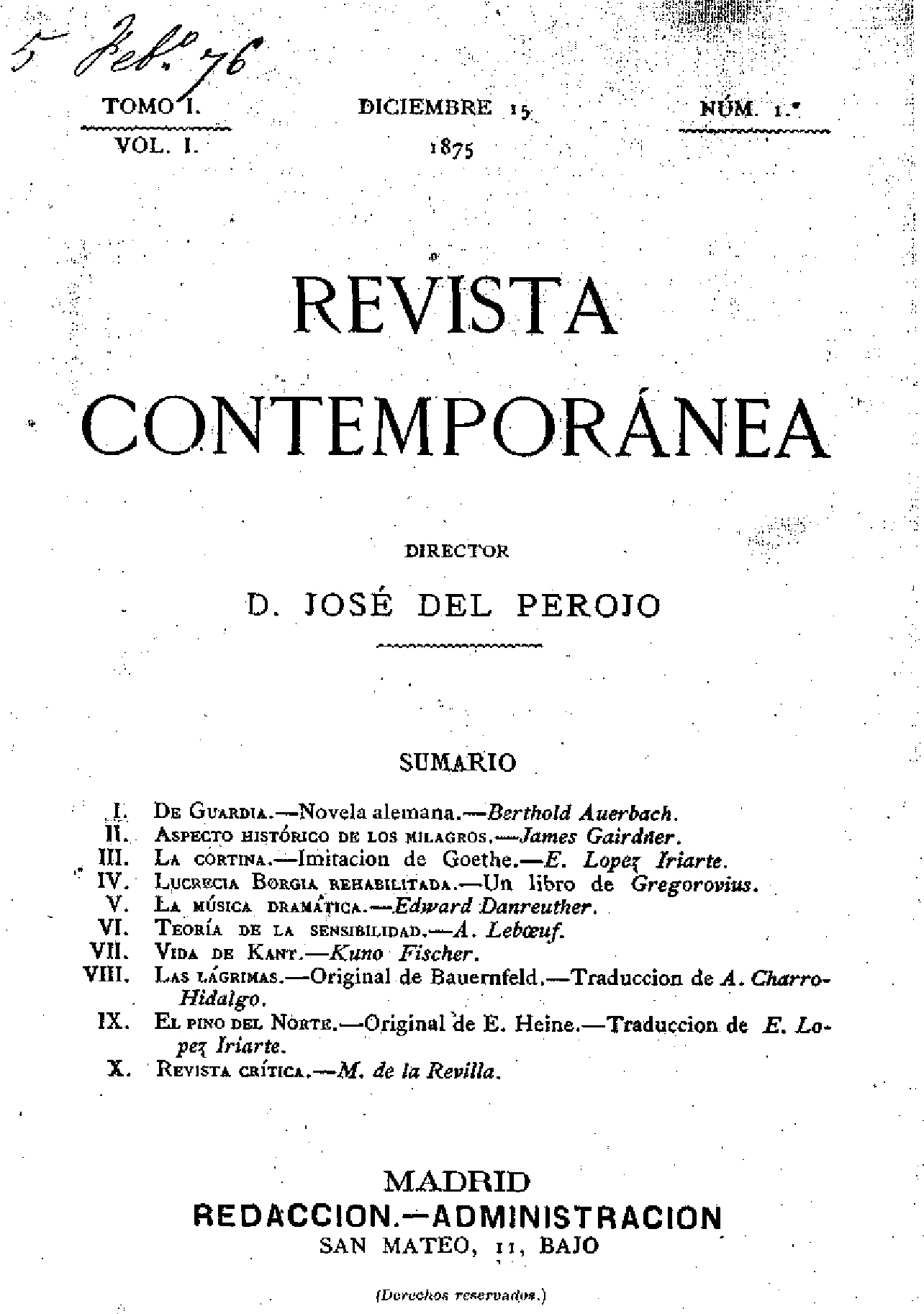
- Cover page of Revista Contemporánea, nº1
- Categories: Literary magazine; Culture magazine
- Founder: José del Perojo
- First issue: 15 December 1875
- Final issue: June 1907
- Country: Spain
- Based in: Madrid
- Language: Spanish

Revista Contemporánea was a literary and cultural magazine which was published in the period 1875–1907 in Madrid, Spain. The magazine was the first publication in Spain which introduced German and French thought.

== History and profile ==
The first issue of Revista Contemporánea appeared on 15 December 1875 in Madrid. The founder was José del Perojo who also edited the magazine in the early period. He was a Cuban-born philosopher and political thinker.

Revista Contemporánea featured literary articles in addition to those about humanistic and scientific fields. One of the regular contributors of the magazine was Pedro Estasén under the editorship of Perojo. In 1879 Perojo sold the publication to José de Cárdenas, and Francisco de Asís Pacheco replaced him as the editor of the magazine. Its ideological orientation was liberal until that event, and the magazine became a conservative publication. When it held a liberal view, the magazine frequently featured articles concerning the emancipation of women. From 1901 Juan Ortega y Rubio edited the magazine. The last issue of Revista Contemporánea was published in June 1907 when the owner of the magazine, José de Cárdenas, died.
