= There's a Good Time Coming =

Song
- Published: 1800s
- Composer: Henry Russell
- Lyricist: Charles Mackay

There's a Good Time Coming is a popular poem written by Charles Mackay and set to music by Henry Russell and was one of that composer of popular music's best-known works in the middle of the nineteenth century.

There's a good time coming, boys,

A good time coming;

We may not live to see the day,

But earth shall glisten in the ray

Of the good time coming.

Cannon balls may aid the truth,

But thought's a weapon stronger,

We'll win our battle by its aid.

Wait a little while longer.

CHORUS.

There's a good time coming, boys,

A good time coming;

There's a good time coming, boys,

Wait a little longer.

There's a good time coming, boys,

A good time coming;

War in all men's eyes shall be

A monster of iniquity,

In the good time coming.

Nations shall not quarrel then,

To prove which is the stronger,

Nor slaughter men for glory's sake;

Wait a little longer.

There's a good time, c

There's a good time coming, boys,

A good time coming;

Let us aid it all we can,

Every woman, every man,

The good time coming;

Smallest help, if rightly given,

Makes the impulse stronger;

It will be strong enough one day,

Wait a little longer.

There's a good time, c.

Independent testimony quoted by John Dodds indicates that the song was popular with new immigrants to the United States; it was recorded as being sung on the emigrant ships as they approached New York Harbor.
