= Przerośl =

- Village
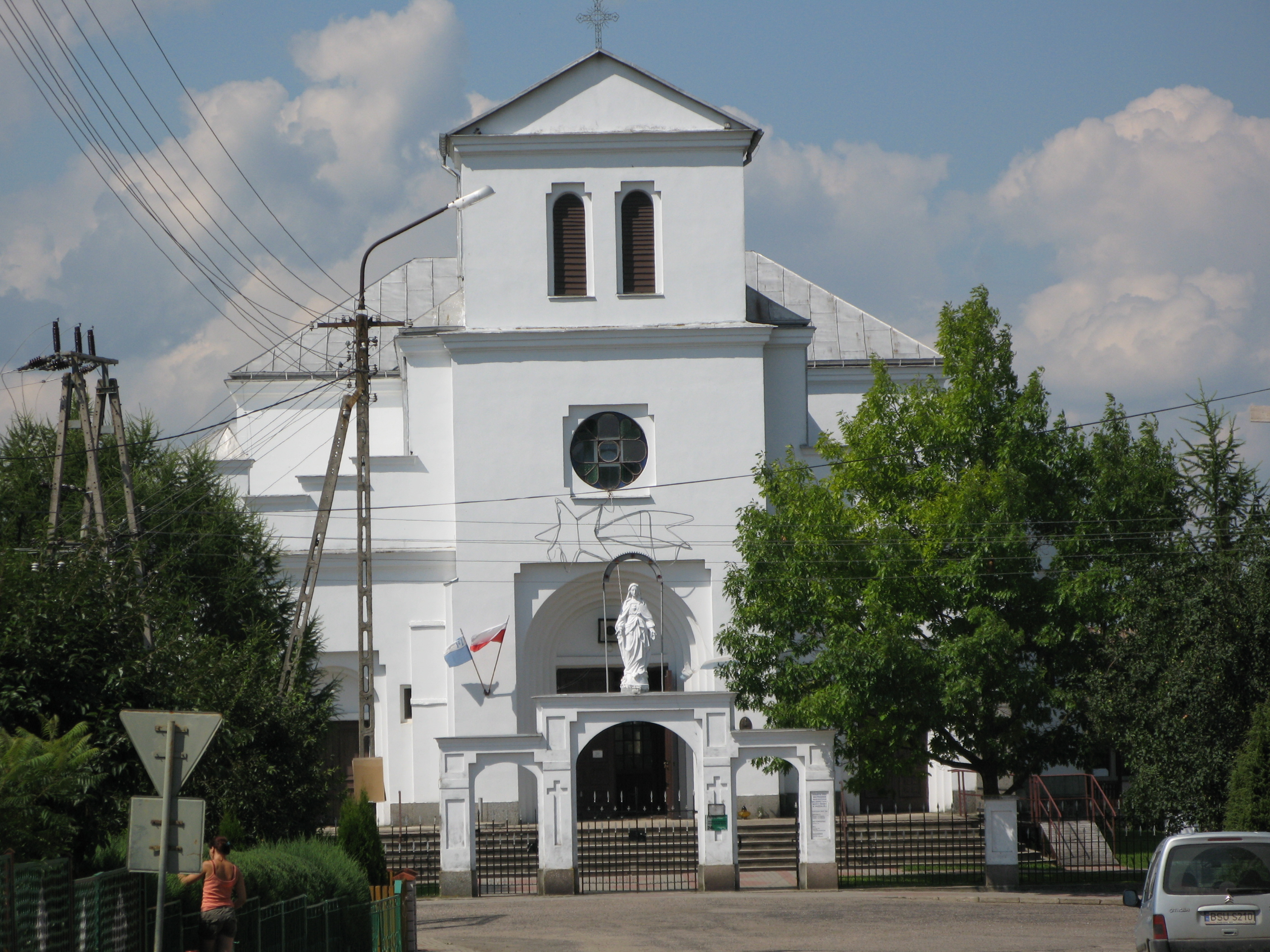
- Catholic church in Przerośl

- Location within Poland
- Coordinates: 54°15′7″N 22°39′22″E
- Country: Poland
- Voivodeship: Podlaskie
- County: Suwałki
- Gmina: Przerośl
- Population: 3,300

Przerośl pronounced [ˈpʂɛrɔɕl] (lit. Prieraslis) is a village in Suwałki County, Podlaskie Voivodeship, in north-eastern Poland. It is the seat of the gmina (administrative unit) called Gmina Przerośl.

== History ==
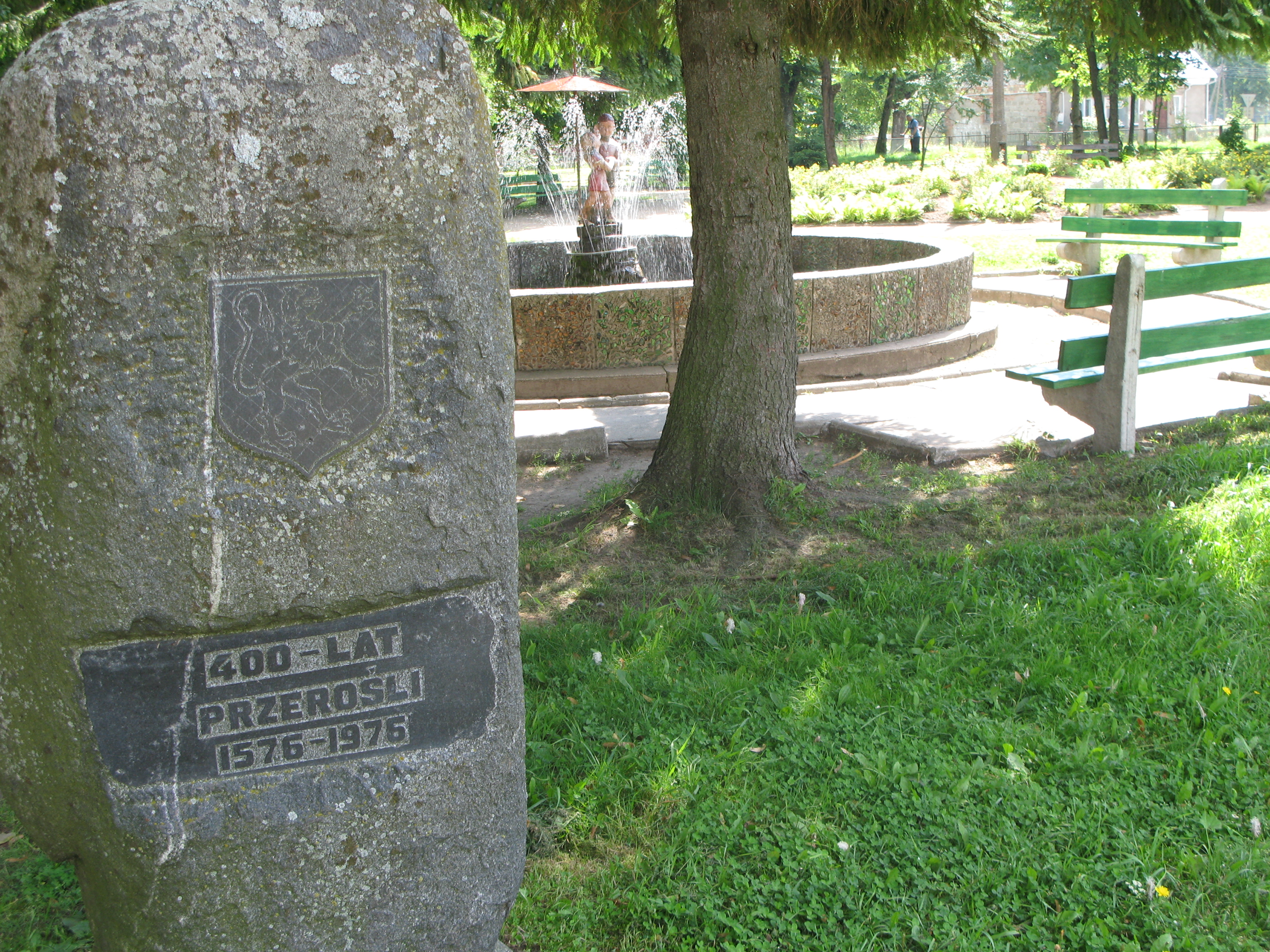
Monument commemorating the 400th anniversary of the town's founding

Settled in 1570, Przerośl received town privileges in 1576 from Stephen Báthory elected king of Poland in the same year, but lost them 1870 due to migration. Even though its population has decreased and administratively it is now only a village, its past is reflected in the urban pattern of its street layout, with a prominent town square. For much of its history the town had a significant Jewish community, which perished during the Holocaust in occupied Poland, and was not re-established afterwards.

== Jewish Cemetery ==
There is an old Jewish cemetery established in 1736 in the southeastern part of the city on the road to Zusienka. The 0.6 hectare cemetery was destroyed during WWII with only 20 or so gravestones and the remnants of a stone wall reamining today. There is an active restoration project lead by the town and descendants living abroad.

Information sign installed as part of the Jewish cemetery restoration project in Przerosl. Note the remnants of the cemetery rock wall in the background.
