= Louise Pyk =

Swedish opera singer

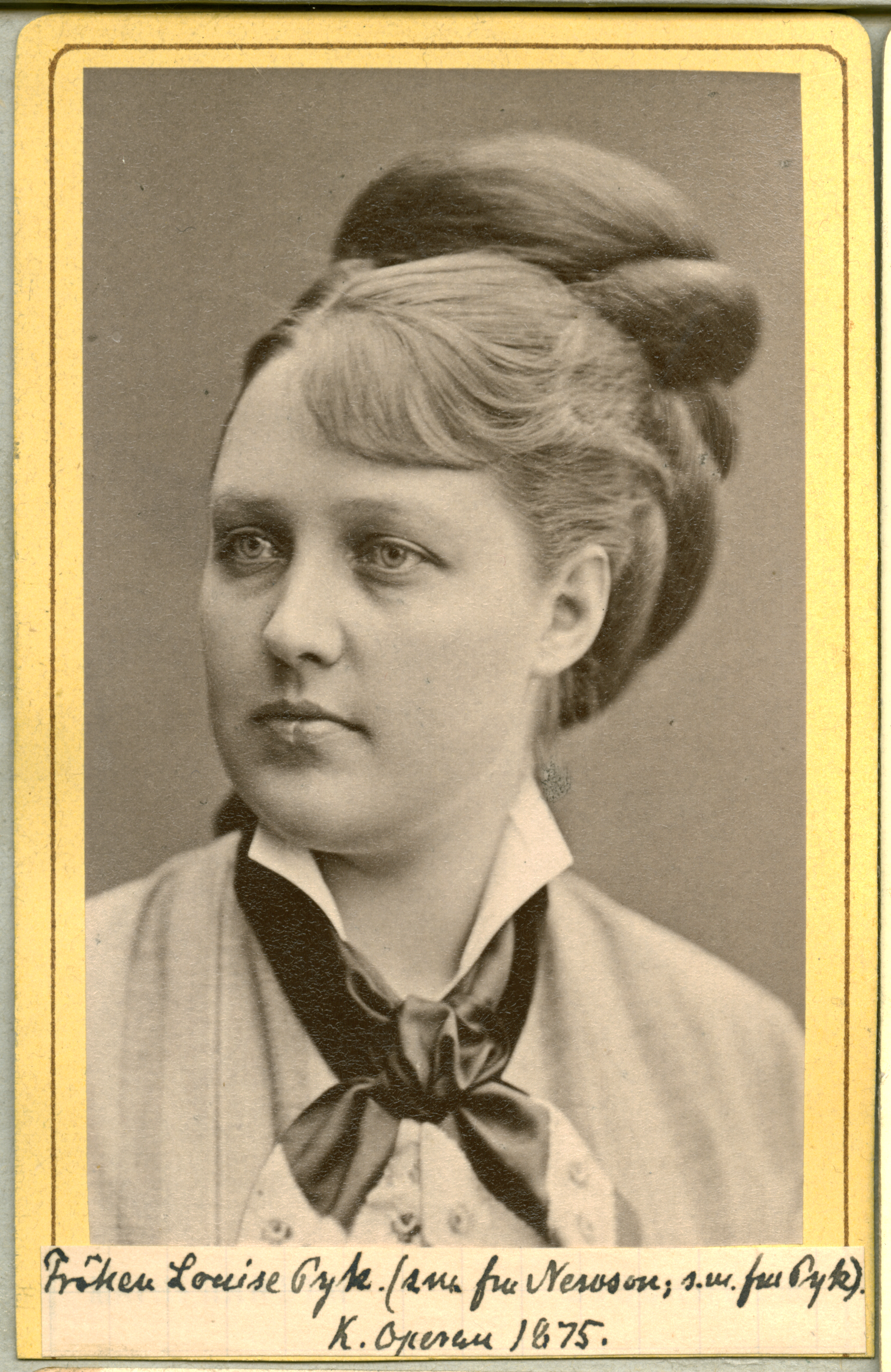
Louise Pyk

Louise Pyk (March 29, 1846 – March 8, 1929) was a Swedish opera singer.

== Biography ==
Louise Pyk was born in Kullaberg. She was the daughter of the sea captain Nils Pyk. She studied music in Helsingborg, at the Royal College of Music, Stockholm and as a student of opera singer (baritone) Georg Efraim Fritz Arlberg (1830-1896).

She made her debut at the Royal Swedish Opera in 1874. She was a student of Pauline Viardot in Paris during 1875, of Trevulsi in Milan during 1877 and of Julius Stockhausen in Frankfurt.

From 1878 to 1883, she was employed at the Covent Garden Theatre in London. She was also active at the Italian Opera in London, and toured in Great Britain during the winter. She performed in the Netherlands and at the Gewandhaus in Leipzig. She was recommended for her strong voice, posture and mimique.

== Personal life ==
She married William B. Newson, captain in the British army, in 1884. She died during 1929 in Ängelholm.

== Other sources ==
- Arvid Ahnfelt Europas konstnärer (1887)
