= Isaac B. Woodbury =

American composer

Isaac Baker Woodbury (October 23, 1819 – 1858) was a 19th-century composer and publisher of church music, most famous for publishing The Dulcimer: or the New York Collection of Sacred Music, one of the best-known collections of Christian hymns of the era. His best-known hymn tunes include Siloam and Esmonton. He also published the American Monthly Musical Review and the New York Musical Pioneer.

Born in Beverly, Massachusetts, Woodbury was the son of Isaac Woodbury and Nancy Baker, and studied music in London and Paris before embarking upon a career as a church organist, writer, editor, and teacher in Boston and New York. In total he published fifteen books of sacred music and fourteen books of school and secular music; he also founded the National Music Convention. Woodbury fell ill with tuberculosis and traveled south for his health, dying while visiting Charleston, South Carolina.

== Sources ==
- Chase, Gilbert (2000). America's Music: From the Pilgrims to the Present. University of Illinois Press. ISBN 0-252-00454-X.
- Metcalf, Frank J. (2007). American Writers and Compilers of Sacred Music. Read Books. ISBN 978-1-4067-5144-4.
- Wright, Henry Parks (1914). History of the Class of 1868: Yale College, 1864-1914. Yale University Class of 1868. Tuttle, Morehouse & Taylor Press.
