= Cultural references to Pierrot =

Cultural references to Pierrot have been made since the inception of the character in the 17th century. His character in contemporary popular culture — in poetry, fiction, and the visual arts, as well as works for the stage, screen, and concert hall — is that of the sad clown, often pining for love of Columbine, who usually breaks his heart and leaves him for Harlequin. Many cultural movements found him amenable to their respective causes: Decadents turned him into a disillusioned foe of idealism; Symbolists saw him as a lonely fellow-sufferer; Modernists converted him into a Whistlerian subject for canvases devoted to form and color and line.

This page lists the extensive use of Pierrot's stock character (whiteface with a tear, white shirt, cap, etc.) chronologically arranged according to country and artistic medium (e.g. music, film, literature). The vast geographical range from Europe to Asia and beyond shows how widespread interest in Pierrot is, as does the variation in the artistic styles, from traditional ballet to rap-songs and music videos.

== Seventeenth century ==
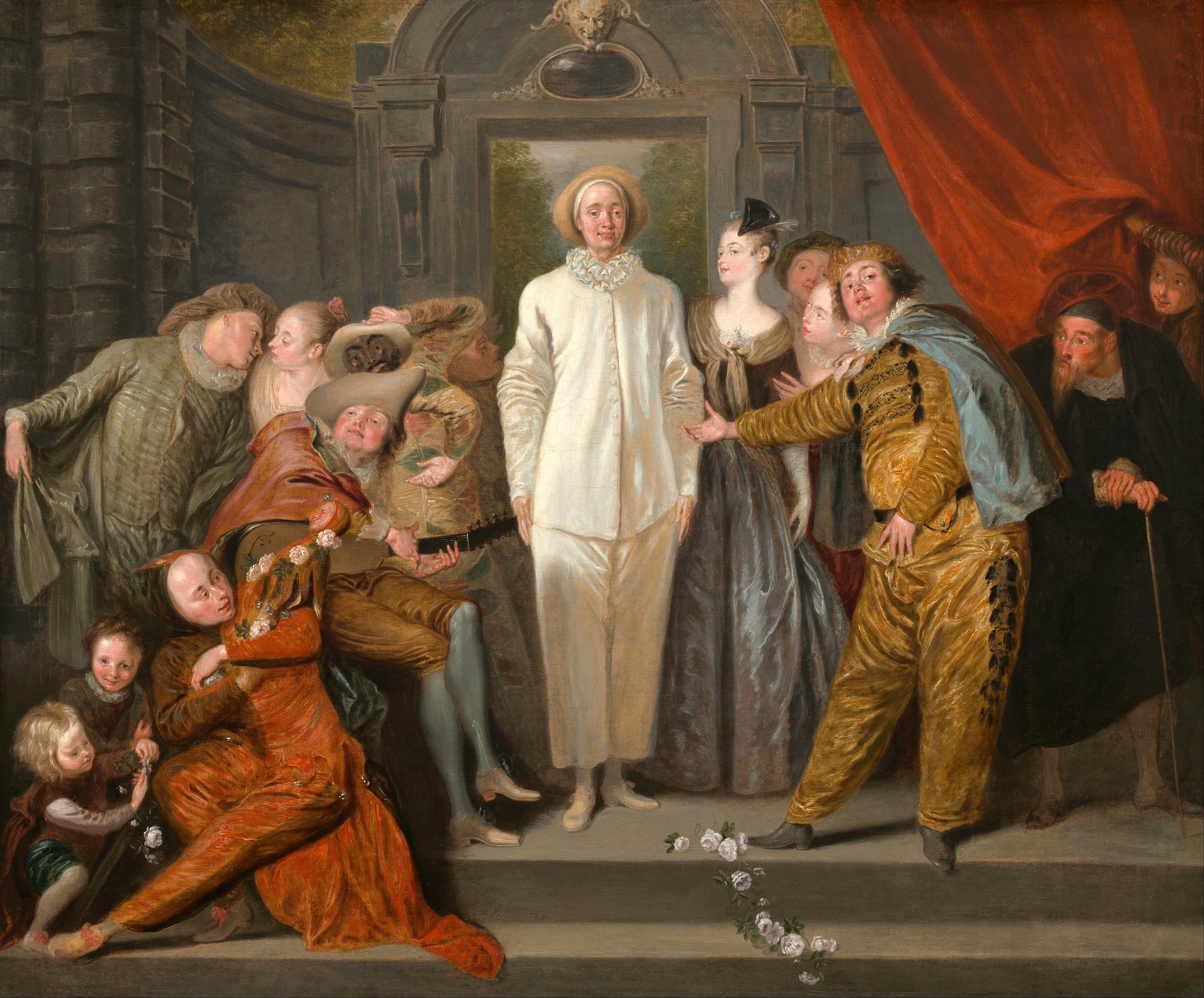
Antoine Watteau: Italian Actors, c. 1719. National Gallery of Art, Washington, D.C.

=== France ===
==== Playwrights ====
- Molière's character Pierrot in Don Juan, or The Stone Guest (1665).
- Jean de Palaprat
- Claude-Ignace Brugière de Barante
- Antoine Houdar de la Motte
- Jean-François Regnard.

== Eighteenth century ==
=== France ===
==== Performing artists ====
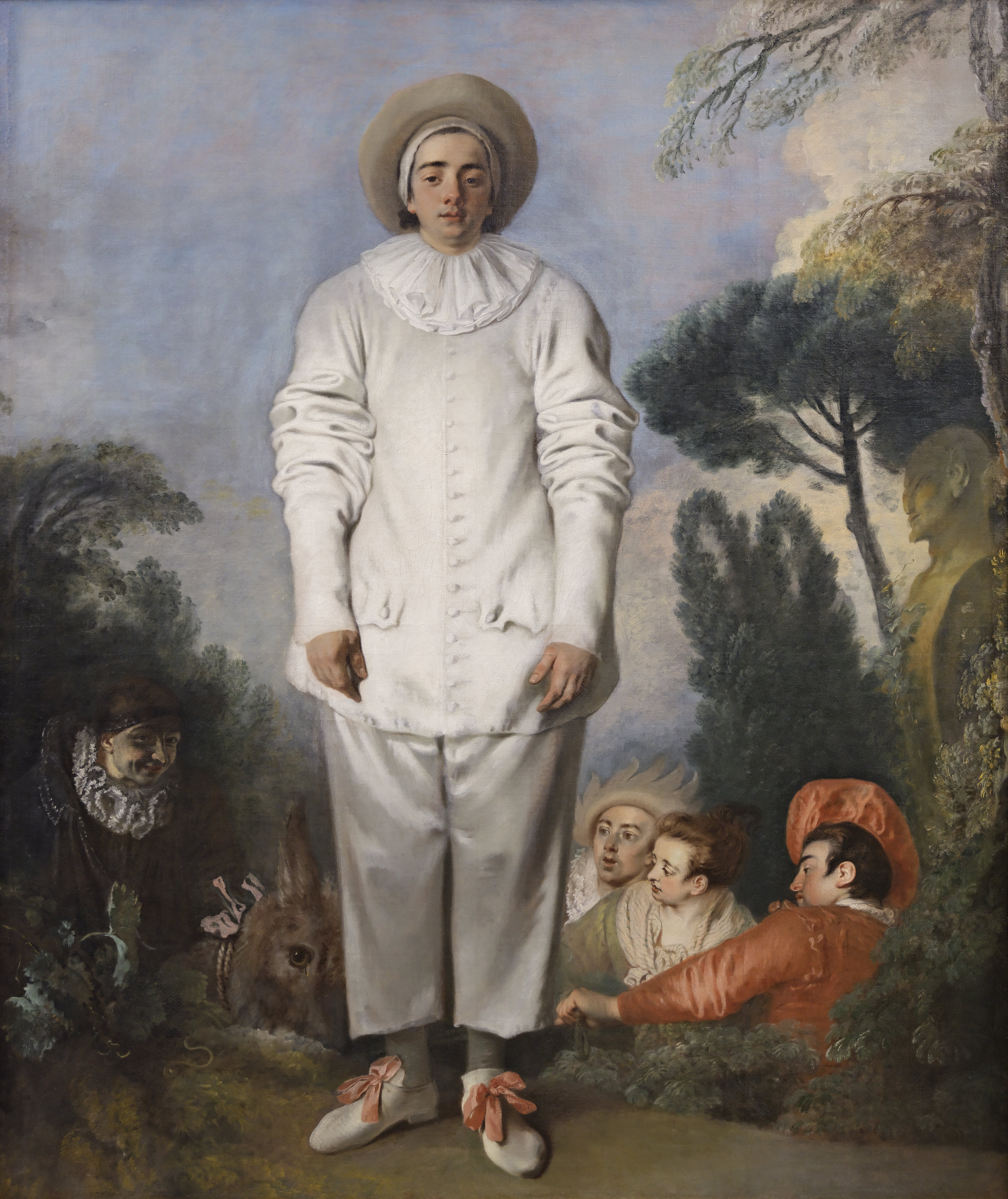
Antoine Watteau: Gilles (or Pierrot) and Four Other Characters of the Commedia dell'arte, c. 1718. Musée du Louvre, Paris.

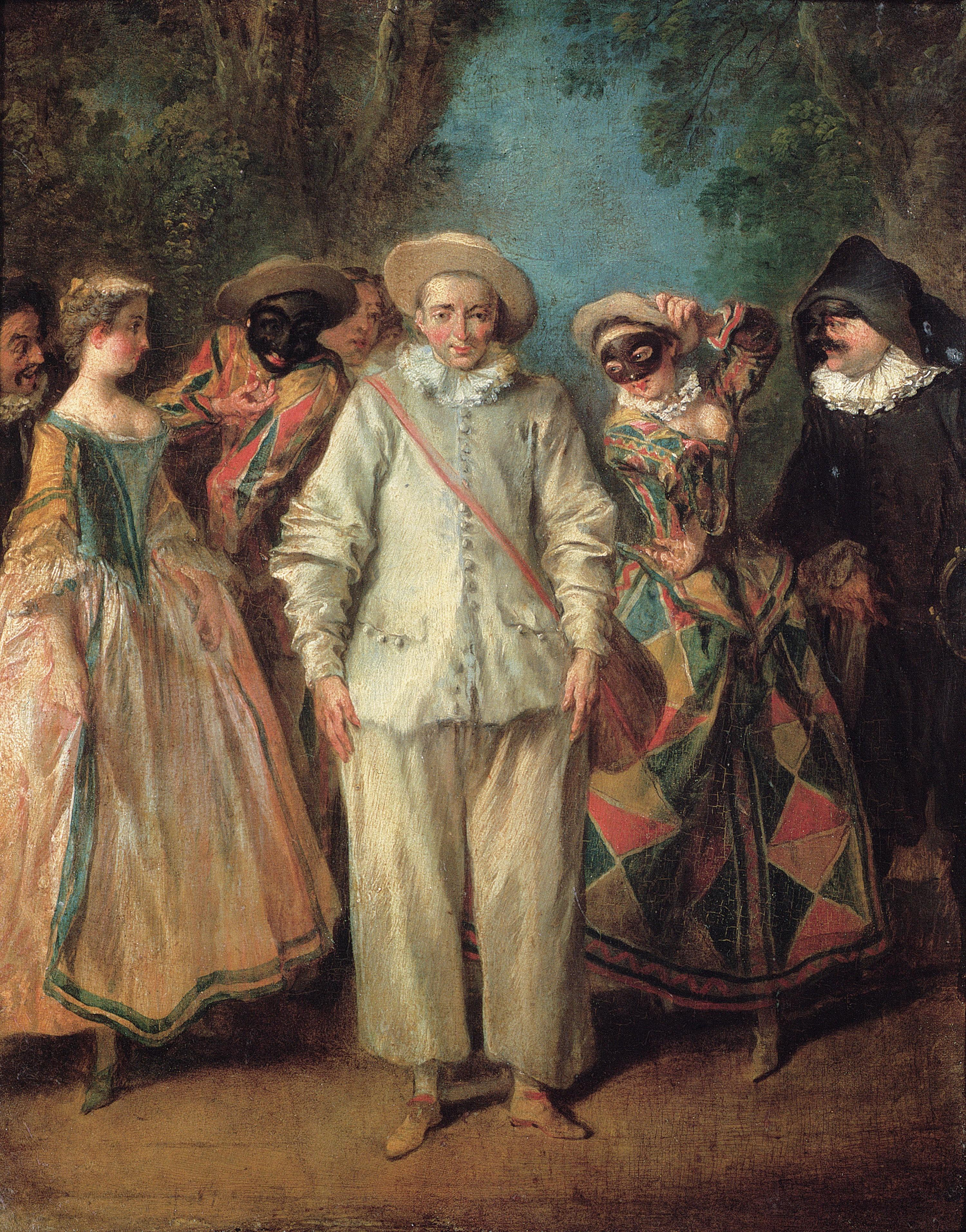
Nicolas Lancret: Actors of the Comédie-Italienne, between 1716 and 1736. Musée du Louvre, Paris.

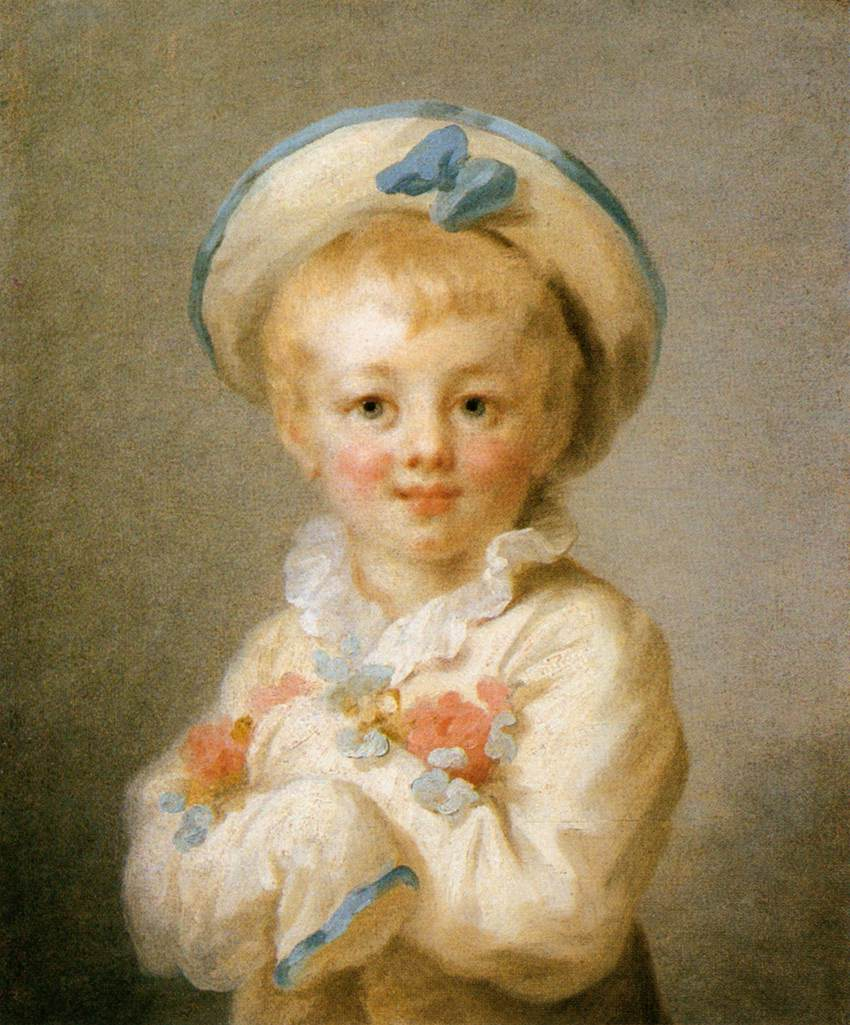
Jean-Honoré Fragonard: A Boy as Pierrot, between 1776 and 1780. The Wallace Collection, London.

- Pierre-François Biancolelli
- Jean-Baptiste Hamoche.
- Fabio Sticotti (1676–1741)
- Antoine Jean Sticotti (1715–1772).

==== Plays ====
- Trophonius's Cave (1722) and The Golden Ass (1725)

==== Songs ====
- ("Au clair de la lune")

==== Visual arts ====
- Jean-Honoré Fragonard (A Boy as Pierrot [1776–1780])
- Claude Gillot (Master André's Tomb [c. 1717]),
- Nicolas Lancret (Italian Actors near a Fountain [c. 1719])
- Philippe Mercier (Pierrot and Harlequin [n.d.])
- Jean-Baptiste Oudry (Italian Actors in a Park [c. 1725])
- Watteau (Italian Actors [c. 1719])

=== England ===
==== Performers ====
- Carlo Delpini as Pierrot So conceived, Pierrot was easily and naturally displaced by the native English Clown when the latter found a suitably brilliant interpreter. It did so in 1800, when "Joey" Grimaldi made his celebrated debut in the role.
- Tiberio Fiorilli as Scaramouche in London.
- John Rich, The Jealous Doctor; or, The Intriguing Dame, pantomime

=== Denmark ===
==== Performers ====
- Pasquale Casorti in Dyrehavsbakken around 1800
- Giuseppe Casorti (1749–1826)

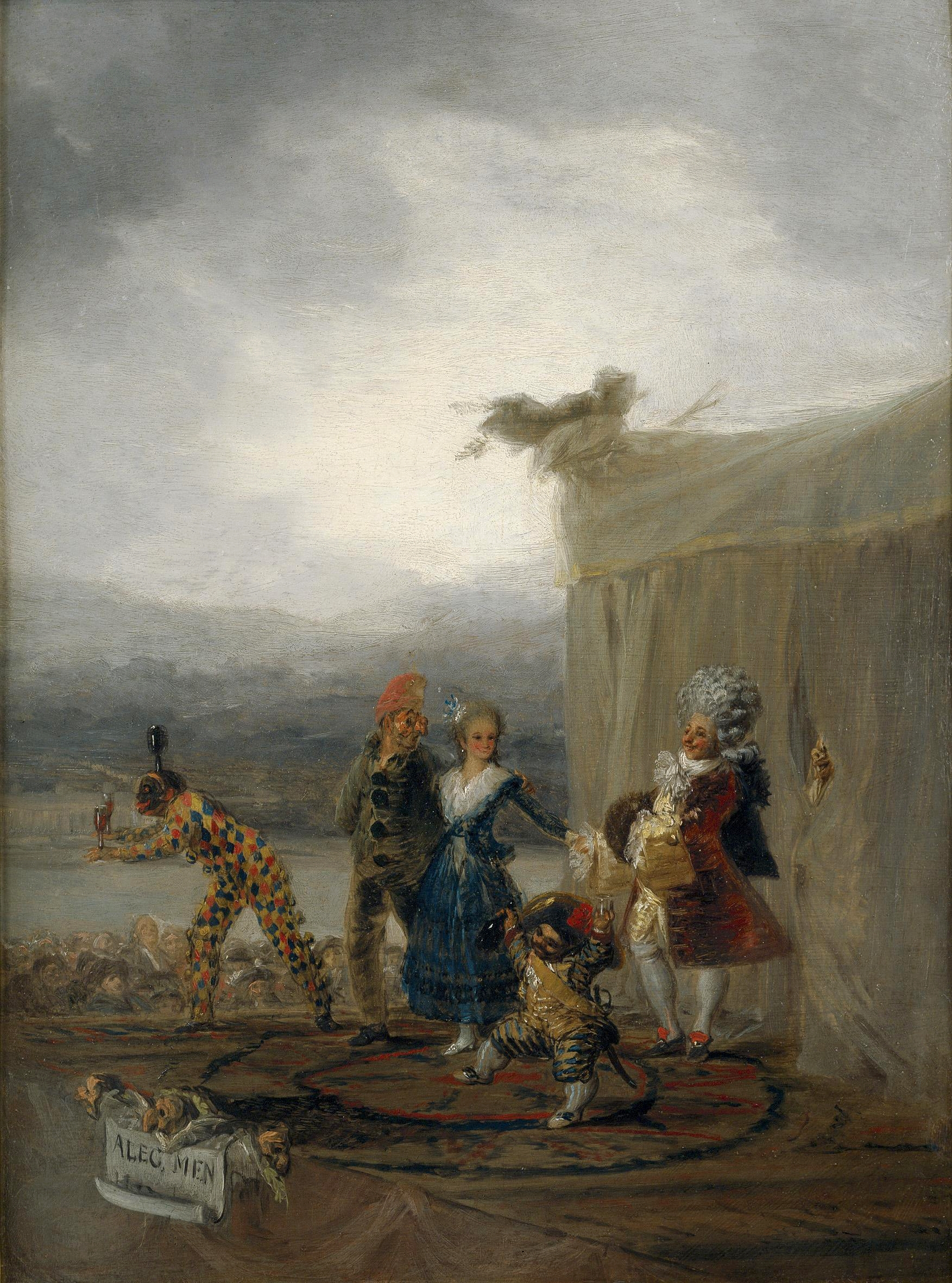
Francisco de Goya: Itinerant Actors (1793). Museo del Prado, Madrid.

=== Germany ===
==== Plays ====
- Ludwig Tieck's The Topsy-Turvy World (1798)

=== Spain ===
==== Paintings ====
- Goya's Itinerant Actors (1793)

== Nineteenth century ==
=== Deburau at the Théâtre des Funambules ===
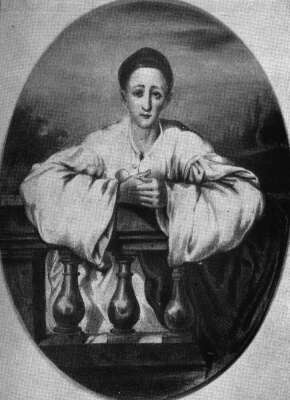
Auguste Bouquet: Jean-Gaspard Deburau, c. 1830.

==== Performers ====
- Jean-Gaspard Deburau (1796–1846),

==== Writers ====
- Charles Baudelaire, "The Essence of Laughter" (1855)
- Théodore de Banville
- Nodier, The Gold Dream, or Harlequin and the Miser (1828)
- Gautier, Posthumous Pierrot (1847)
- Banville, The Kiss (1887)

==== Visual arts ====
- Drawing by Gustave Courbet for Fernand Desnoyers's The Black Arm (1856)
- Gustave Doré: Grimacing Pierrot
- Honoré Daumier
- Jean-Léon Gérôme: Duel after a Masked Ball (1857)
- Thomas Couture: The Supper after the Masked Ball (c. 1855)
- Henri Rivière, Pierrot novella
- Paul Margueritte, Pierrot, Murderer of His Wife (1881)
- Séverin's Poor Pierrot (1891)
- Catulle Mendès' Ol' Clo's Man (1896)

=== Pantomime after Baptiste: Charles Deburau, Paul Legrand, and their successors ===
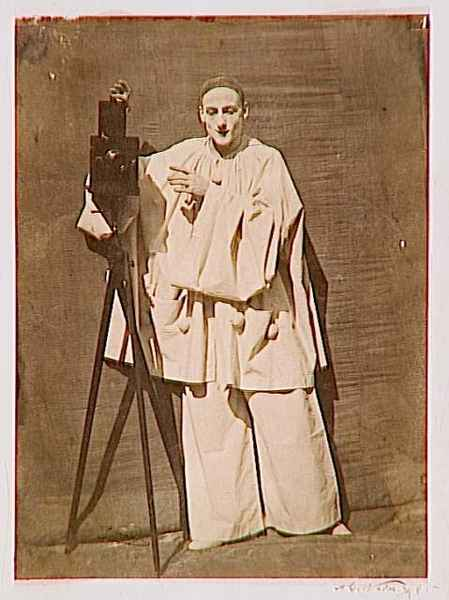
- Nadar: Charles Deburau as Pierrot, 1854.
- Charles Deburau (1829–1873) succeeded his father. (Nadar's photographs of him in various poses are some of the best to come out of his studio—if not some of the best of the era.)
- Paul Legrand (1816–1898) performed at the Funambules. He later moved to the Folies-Nouvelles. In this he was abetted by the novelist and journalist Champfleury, who set himself the task, in the 1840s, of writing "realistic" pantomimes.
- Louis Rouffe (1849–1885) performed the role.
- Séverin (1863–1930)
- Georges Wague (1875–1965)
- Marcel Marceau's Bip was a Pierrot of sorts.

==== Writers ====
- Marquis Pierrot (1847)
- Pantomime of the Attorney (1865)
- Gustave Flaubert, Pierrot in the Seraglio (1855)

=== Pantomime and late nineteenth-century art ===
==== France ====
Popular and literary pantomime

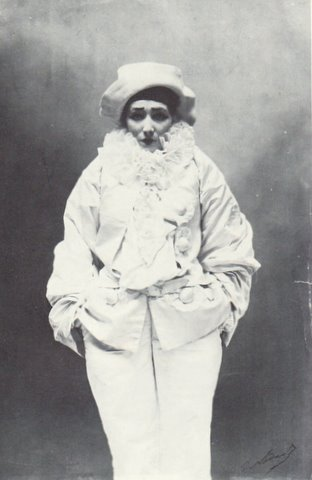
Atelier Nadar: Sarah Bernhardt in Jean Richepin's Pierrot the Murderer, 1883. Bibliothèque Nationale, Paris.

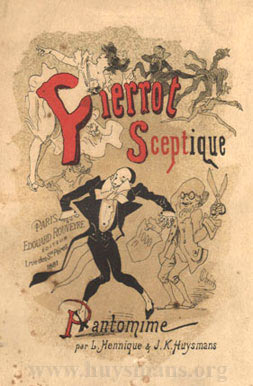
Jules Chéret: Title-page of Hennique and Huysmans' Pierrot the Skeptic, 1881

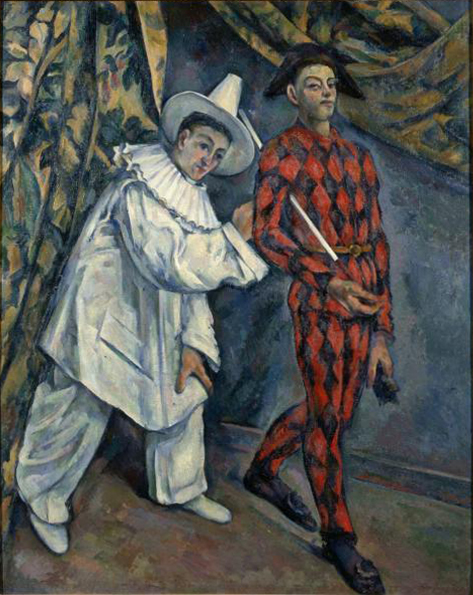
Paul Cézanne: Mardi gras (Pierrot and Harlequin), 1888, Pushkin Museum, Moscow

- A female version, Pierrette, appears on the scene

Songs

- Xavier Privas wrote the songs ["Pierrette Is Dead", "Pierrette's Christmas"]

Performing artists

- Félicia Mallet played Pierrot at the Cercle Funambulesque
- Sarah Bernhardt in Jean Richepin's Pierrot the Murderer (1883).
- The English brothers Hanlon-Lees, portrayed Pierrots, sometimes at the Folies Bergère.

Visual arts, fiction, poetry, music, and film

- Adolphe Willette drew Pierrots
- Willette's paintings.
- Jules Chéret, posters
- Odilon Redon, engravings The Swamp Flower: A Sad Human Head (1885)
- Georges Seurat, paintings (Pierrot with a White Pipe [Aman-Jean] (1883); The Painter Aman-Jean as Pierrot (1883)
- Léon Comerre: Pierrot (1884), Pierrot Playing the Mandolin (1884)
- Henri Rousseau: A Carnival Night (1886), Paul Cézanne: Mardi gras [Pierrot and Harlequin] (1888)
- Fernand Pelez (Grimaces and Miseries a.k.a. The Saltimbanques (1888)
- Pablo Picasso (Pierrot and Columbine (1900)
- Guillaume Seignac (Pierrot's Embrace (1900)
- Théophile Steinlen (Pierrot and the Cat (1889)
- Édouard Vuillard (The Black Pierrot (c. 1890)
- Jean Richepin's novel Nice People; Braves Gens (1886)
- Paul Verlaine, "Pantomime" (1869) and "Pierrot" (1868, pub. 1882).
- Laforgue, poems (1885) and The Imitation of Our Lady the Moon (1886)
- Claude Debussy's songs "Pantomime" and "Pierrot" (not published until 1926)
- Telemann's Burlesque Overture (1717–22)
- Mozart's 1783 "Masquerade"
- Robert Schumann's Carnival (1835).
- Georges Méliès's film A Nightmare [1896], The Magician [1898]
- Alice Guy's film Arrival of Pierrette and Pierrot [1900], Pierrette's Amorous Adventures [1900]
- Ambroise-François Parnaland's Pierrot's Big Head/Pierrot's Tongue [1900], Pierrot-Drinker [1900])
- Emile Reynaud's Poor Pierrot (1892)

==== Belgium ====
Painters

- Félicien Rops, Blowing Cupid's Nose [1881] James Ensor The Strange Masks [1892], Pierrot's Despair [1892], Pierrot and Skeleton in Yellow [1893]
- Albert Giraud, poem Pierrot lunaire (Moonstruck Pierrot [1884]), Pierrot-Narcissus (1887)
- choreographer Joseph Hansen's 1884 ballet, Macabre Pierrot (together with poet Théo Hannon
- England

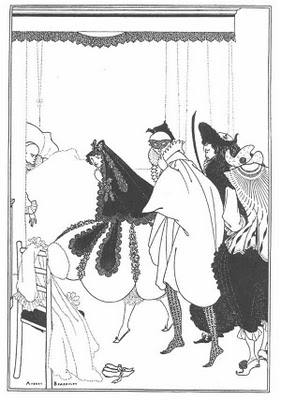
Aubrey Beardsley: "The Death of Pierrot", The Savoy, August 1896.

- Pierrot figured prominently in the drawings of Aubrey Beardsley, and various writers referenced him in their poetry.
- Ethel Wright, painting Bonjour, Pierrot! (1893)
- Clifford Essex, pantomime L'Enfant prodigue (Pierrot the Prodigal [1890])
- Pierrots sang, danced, juggled, and joked on the piers of Brighton, Margate and Blackpool.
- Will Morris Pierrots
- Walter Westley Russell painting The Pierrots (c. 1900)
- Edward Gordon Craig, in 1897, gave a stage-reading dressed as Pierrot.

==== Austria and Germany ====
- Franz Blei: The Kissy-Face: A Columbiade (1895)
- Richard Specht: Pierrot-Hunchback (1896)
- Richard Beer-Hofmann: Pierrot-Hypnotist (1892, first pub. 1984).
- Hermann Bahr: Pantomime of the Good Man (1893)
- Rudolf Holzer: Puppet Loyalty (1899)
- Karl Michael von Levetzow: Two Pierrots (1900)

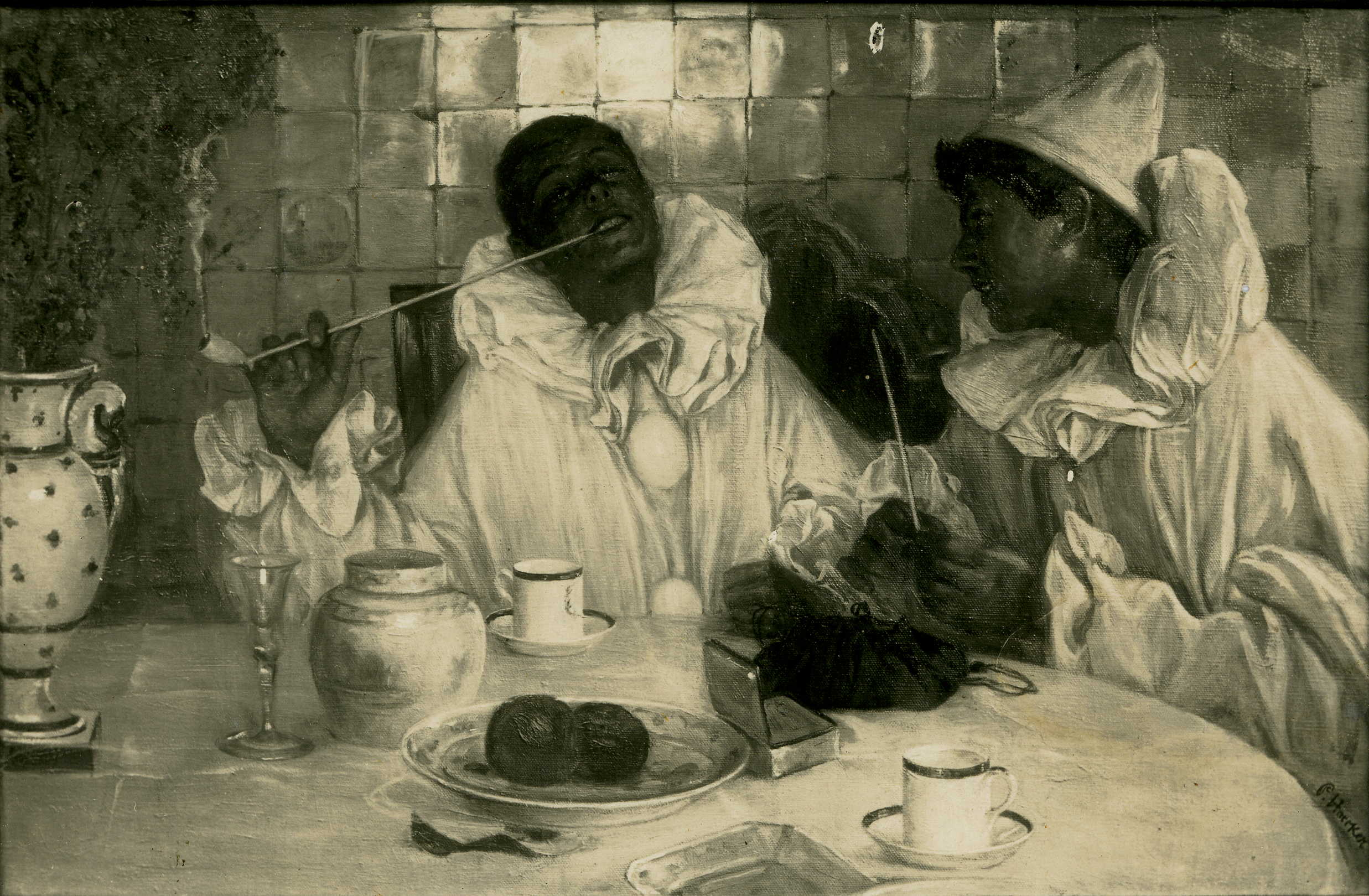
Paul Hoecker: Pierrots with Pipes, c. 1900. Location unknown.

- Frank Wedekind, Earth Spirit (1895)
- Paul Hoecker paintings Pierrots with Pipes (c. 1900) and Waiting Woman (c. 1895).

==== Italy ====
- Leoncavallo, Pagliacci opera (1892)
- Mario Pasquale Costa L'Histoire d'un Pierrot (Story of a Pierrot), 1893
- Vittorio Monti Cavalleria Rusticana 1909
- Baldassarre Negroni Cavalleria Rusticana as a film in 1914. Its libretto, like that of Monti's "mimodrama" Noël de Pierrot a.k.a. A Clown's Christmas (1900), was written by Fernand Beissier.
- Vittorio Matteo Corcos painting Portrait of Boy in Pierrot Costume, 1897

==== Spain ====
- Jacinto Benavente play The Whiteness of Pierrot.

==== North America ====
- Pierrot in the so-called little magazines of the 1890s. The Chap-Book (1894–98) printed Percival Pollard's Pierrot piece in its second number,
- Canadian poet Bliss Carman in Harper's.)
- composer Amy Beach Children's Carnival (1894)
- composer Arthur Foote Five Bagatelles (1893)
- William Dean Howells, Pastels in Prose (1890)
- Alfred Thompson, Pierrot the Painter (1893), music by Laura Sedgwick Collins.
- Stuart Merrill, Pastels in Prose William Theodore Peters, Posies out of Rings: And Other Conceits (1896)
- Bernardo Couto Castillo, short stories "Pierrot Enamored of Glory" (1897), "Pierrot and His Cats" (1898), "The Nuptials of Pierrot" (1899), "Pierrot's Gesture" (1899), "The Caprices of Pierrot" (1900), "Pierrot-Gravedigger" (1901).

==== Central and South America ====
- Rubén Darío, 1898 prose-poem The Eternal Adventure of Pierrot and Columbine.

==== Russia ====
Dance

- Harlequin's Millions a.k.a. Harlequinade (1900), its libretto and choreography by Marius Petipa, its music by Riccardo Drigo
- Pierrot in the productions of the Ballets Russes.

== Early twentieth century (1901–1950): notable works ==
=== Non-operatic works for stage and screen ===
==== Plays, playlets, pantomimes, and revues ====
- American (U.S.A.)—Clements, Colin Campbell: Pierrot in Paris (1923); Faulkner, William: The Marionettes (1920, pub. 1977); Hughes, Glenn: Pierrot's Mother (1923); Johnstone, Will B.: I'll Say She Is (1924 revue featuring the Marx Brothers and two "breeches" Pierrots; music by Tom Johnstone); Macmillan, Mary Louise: Pan or Pierrot: A Masque (1924); Millay, Edna St. Vincent: Aria da Capo (1920); Renaud, Ralph E.: Pierrot Meets Himself (1933); Rogers, Robert Emmons: Behind a Watteau Picture (1918); Shephard, Esther: Pierrette's Heart (1924); Thompson, Blanche Jennings: The Dream Maker (1922); Walker, Stuart: The Moon Lady (written 1908, produced c. 1915).
- Argentinian—Lugones, Leopoldo: The Black Pierrot (1909).
- Austrian—Hardt-Warden, Bruno, and Ignaz Michael Welleminsky: The Tarantella of Death (1920; music by Julius Bittner); Noetzel, Hermann: Pierrot's Summer Night (1924); Schnitzler, Arthur: The Transformations of Pierrot (1908), The Veil of Pierrette (1910; with music by Ernö Dohnányi; see also "Stuppner" among the Italian composers under Western classical music (instrumental) below); Schreker, Franz: The Blue Flower, or The Heart of Pierrot: A Tragic Pantomime (1909), The Bird, or Pierrot's Mania: A Pantomimic Comedy (1909).
- Belgian—Cantillon, Arthur: Pierrot before the Seven Doors (1924).
- Brazilian—César da Silva, Júlio: The Death of Pierrot (1915).
- British—Burnaby, Davy: The Co-Optimists (revue of 1921—which was revised continually up to 1926—played in Pierrot costumes, with music and lyrics by various entertainers; filmed in 1929); Cannan, Gilbert: Pierrot in Hospital (1923); Craig, Edward Gordon: The Masque of Love (1901; a chorus of Pierrots, strung like puppets, is manipulated by a chorus of Harlequins); "Cryptos" and James T. Tanner: Our Miss Gibbs (1909; musical comedy played in Pierrot costumes); Down, Oliphant: The Maker of Dreams (1912); Drinkwater, John: The Only Legend: A Masque of the Scarlet Pierrot (1913; music by James Brier); Housman, Laurence, and Harley Granville-Barker: Prunella: or, Love in a Dutch Garden (1906, rev. ed. 1911; film of play, directed by Maurice Tourneur, released in 1918); Lyall, Eric: Two Pierrot Plays (1918); Rodker, John: "Fear" (1914), "Twilight I" (1915), "Twilight II" (1915); Sargent, Herbert C.: Pierrot Playlets: Cackle for Concert Parties (1920).
- Canadian—Carman, Bliss, and Mary Perry King: Pas de trois (1914); Green, Harry A.: The Death of Pierrot: A Trivial Tragedy (1923); Lockhart, Gene: The Pierrot Players (1918; music by Ernest Seitz).
- Croatian—Krleža, Miroslav: Mascherata (1914).
- Dutch—Nijhoff, Martinus: Pierrot at the Lamppost (1918).
- French—Baival, C., Paul Ternoise, and Albert Verse: Pierrot's Choice (1950); Ballieu, A. Jacques: Pierrot at the Seaside (1905); Beissier, Fernand: Mon Ami Pierrot (1923); Champsaur, Félicien: The Wedding of the Dream (pantomimic interlude in novel Le Combat des sexes [1927]); Guitry, Sacha: Deburau (1918); Hennique, Léon: The Redemption of Pierrot (1903); Morhardt, Mathias: Mon ami Pierrot (1919); Prévert, Jacques: Baptiste (1946; choreography by Jean-Louis Barrault; Marcel Marceau played Harlequin); Strarbach, Gaston: Pierrot's Revenge (1913); Tervagne, Georges de, and Colette Cariou: Mon ami Pierrot (1945); Voisine, Auguste: Pierrot's Scullery-Brats (1903); Willette, Adolphe: Several works, including The Golden Age (1907; Georges Wague played Pierrot), Montmartre (1913; choreography by Mariquita; music by Auguste Georges Bosc).
- German—Feuchtwanger, Lion: Pierrot's Dream (1916); Levetzow, Karl Michael von: Pierrot's Life, Suffering, and Ascension (1902); Münzer, Kurt: The Last Mask (1917; music by Wilhelm Mauke).
- Irish—Clarke, Austin: Trilogy of Pierrot/Pierrette plays—The Kiss (1942), The Second Kiss (1946), The Third Kiss (1976).
- Italian—Adami, Giuseppe: Pierrot in Love (1924); Cavacchioli, Enrico: Pierrot, Employee of the Lottery: Grotesque Fantasy ... (1920); Zangarini, Carlo: The Divine Pierrot: Modern Tragicomedy ... (1931).
- Japanese—Michio Itō (worked mainly in U.S.A.): The Donkey (1918; music by Lassalle Spier).

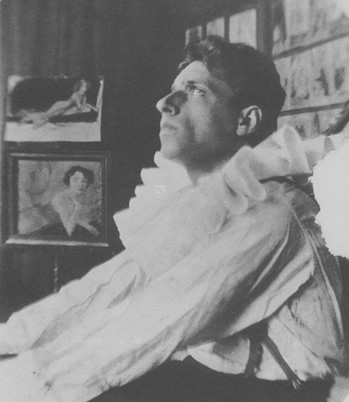
Vsevolod Meyerhold dressed as Pierrot for his own production of Alexander Blok's Fairground Booth, 1906.

- Mexican—Rubio, Darío: Pierrot (1909).
- Polish—Leśmian, Boleslaw: Pierrot and Columbine (c. 1910).
- Portuguese—Almada Negreiros, José de: Pierrot and Harlequin (1924).
- Russian—Blok, Alexander: The Fairground Booth a.k.a. The Puppet Show (1906); Evreinov, Nikolai: A Merry Death (1908), Today's Columbine (1915), The Chief Thing (1921; turned into film, La Comédie du bonheur, in 1940).
- Slovenian—Grum, Slavko: Pierrot and Pierrette (1921).
- Spanish—Aguilar Oliver, Santiago: Gypsy, or Pierrot's Escapade (n.d.); Gual, Adrià: The Return of Pierrot (1903); Ras, Matilde: Pierrot's Studio (1934); Rusiñol, Santiago: The Song of Always (1906).

==== Ballet, cabaret, and Pierrot troupes ====
- Austrian—Rathaus, Karol: The Last Pierrot (1927; ballet).
- British—Gordon, Harry: Scottish entertainer (1893–1957)—formed a Pierrot troupe in 1909 that played both in theaters and at seaside piers in the northeast of Scotland; The Toreadors Concert Party: formed by Charles Elderton at The Theatre Royal in Hebburn, it was performed from 1904 in Whitley Bay at what became known as Spanish City.
- French—Saint-Saëns, Camille: Pierrot the Astronomer (1907; ballet).
- French/Russian—Productions of the Ballets Russes, under the direction of Sergei Diaghilev:
  - Le Carnaval (1910)—music by Robert Schumann (orchestrated by Aleksandr Glazunov, Nikolai Rimsky-Korsakov, Anatole Liadov, and Alexander Tcherepnin), choreography by Michel Fokine, set and costumes by Léon Bakst.
  - Papillons (Butterflies [1914])—music by Robert Schumann (arranged by Nicolai Tcherepnin), choreography by Michel Fokine, sets by Mstislav Dobuzhinsky, and costumes by Léon Bakst. (This ballet had originally debuted, in 1912, under different directorial auspices, with sets by Piotr Lambine.)
  - Parade (1917)—scenario by Jean Cocteau, music by Eric Satie, choreography by Léonide Massine, set and costumes by Pablo Picasso.
  - Petrushka (1911)—music by Igor Stravinsky, choreography by Michel Fokine, sets and costumes by Alexandre Benois. (As the Wikipedia article on Petrushka indicates, the Russian clown is in general a Pulcinella figure, but in this ballet he seems closer to a Pierrot.)

Alexander Vertinsky as Pierrot. Poster by pre-revolutionary unknown artist.

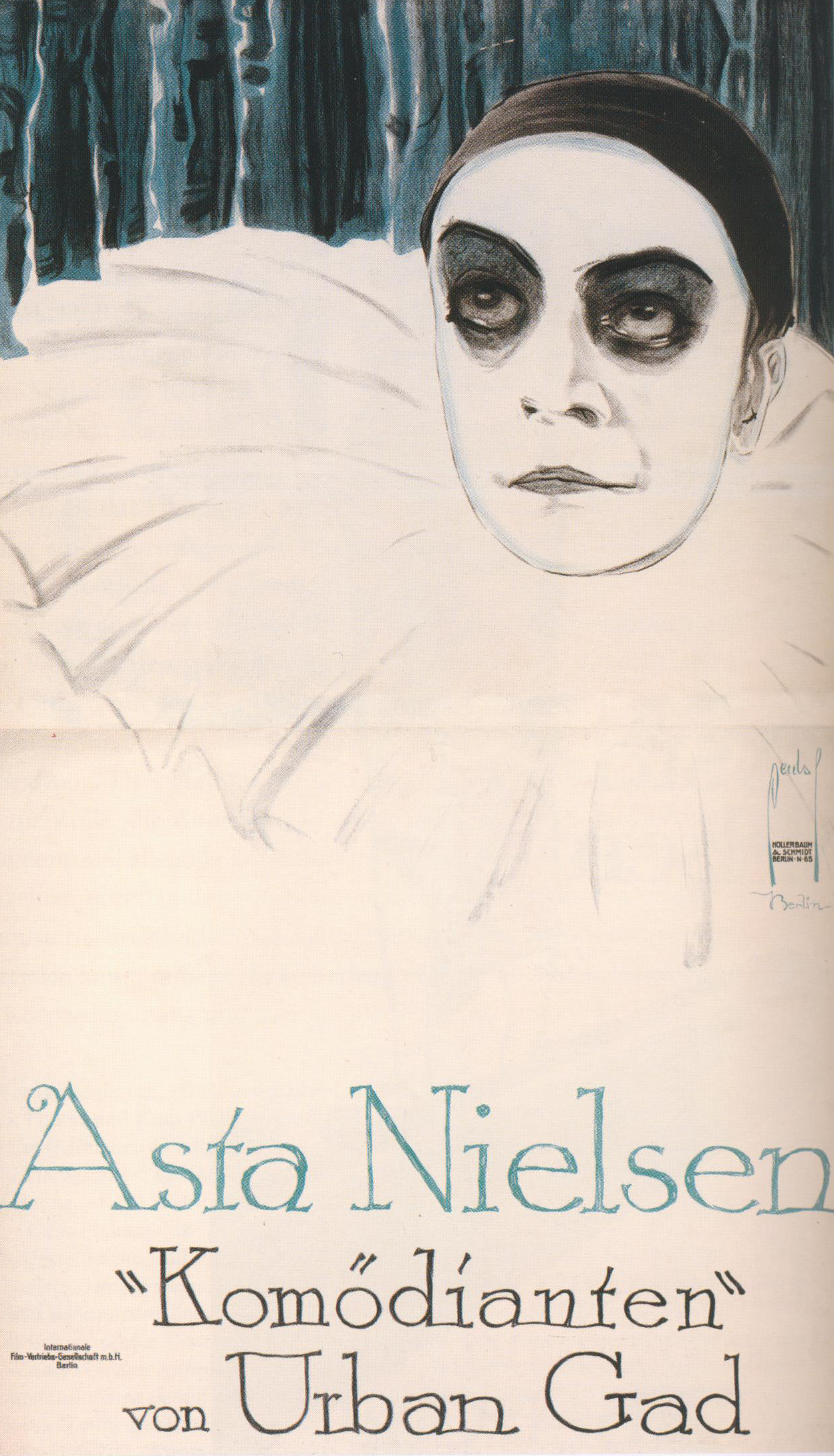
Asta Nielsen as Pierrot in Urban Gad's Behind Comedy's Mask (1913). Poster by Ernst Deutsch-Dryden.

- German—Schlemmer, Oskar, and Paul Hindemith: Triadic Ballet (1922).
- Russian—Fokine, Michel: The Immortal Pierrot (1925; ballet, premiered in New York City); Legat, Nikolai and Sergei: The Fairy Doll Pas de trois (1903; ballet; added to production of Josef Bayer's ballet Die Puppenfee in St. Petersburg; music by Riccardo Drigo; revived in 1912 as Les Coquetteries de Columbine, with Anna Pavlova).
  - Vertinsky, Alexander: Cabaret singer (1889–1957)—became known as the "Russian Pierrot" after debuting around 1916 with "Pierrot's doleful ditties"—songs that chronicled tragic incidents in the life of Pierrot. Dressed in black, his face powdered white, he performed world-wide, settling for nine years in Paris in 1923 to play the Montmartre cabarets. One of his admirers, Konstantin Sokolsky, assumed his Pierrot persona when he debuted as a singer in 1928.
- See also Pierrot lunaire below.

==== Films ====
- American (U.S.A.)—Bradley, Will: Moongold: A Pierrot Pantomime (1921); Browning, Tod: Puppets (1916); Cukor, George: Sylvia Scarlett (1935; based upon the Compton MacKenzie novel [see Fiction below]); De Pace, Bernardo: The Wizard of the Mandolin (1927).
- Danish—Schnéevoigt, George: Pierrot Is Crying (1931).
- Dutch—Frenkel Jr., Theo: The Death of Pierrot (1920); Binger, Maurits: Pierrot's Lie (1922).
- French—Burguet, Paul-Henry: The Imprint, or The Red Hand (1908; Gaston Séverin plays Pierrot); Carné, Marcel: Children of Paradise (1945; see above under The Pantomime of Deburau at the Théâtre des Funambules); Carré fils, Michel: The Prodigal Son a.k.a. Pierrot the Prodigal (1907; the first European feature-length film and the first film of a complete stage-play [i.e., Carré's pantomime of 1890]; Georges Wague plays Pierrot père); Feuillade, Louis: Pierrot's Projector (1909), Pierrot, Pierrette (1924); Guitry, Sacha: Deburau (1951; based upon Guitry's own stage-play [see Plays, playlets, pantomimes, and revues above]); Guy, Alice: Pierrot, Murderer (1904); Leprince, René: Pierrot Loves Roses (1910); Méliès, Georges: By Moonlight, or The Unfortunate Pierrot (1904).
- German—Gad, Urban: Behind Comedy's Mask (1913; Pierrot is played by Asta Nielsen); Gottowt, John: The Black Lottery Ticket, or Pierrot's Last Night on the Town (1913); Löwenbein, Richard: Marionettes (1918); Piel, Harry: The Black Pierrot (1913, 1926); Wich, Ludwig von: The Cuckolded Pierrot (1917).
- Italian—Alberini, Filoteo: Pierrot in Love (1906); Bacchini, Romolo: Pierrot's Heart (1909); Camagni, Bianca Virginia: Fantasy (1921); Caserini, Mario: A Pierrot's Romance (1906); Falena, Ugo: The Disillusionment of Pierrot (1915); Negroni, Baldassarre: Story of a Pierrot a.k.a. Pierrot the Prodigal (1913; based on 1893 pantomime by Mario Pasquale Costa [see Italy above]; Pierrot is played by Francesca Bertini); Notari, Elvira and Eduardo: So Cries Pierrot (1924).
- Polish—Karenne, Diana (worked mainly in Italy, Germany, and France): Pierrot a.k.a. Story of a Pierrot (1917).
- Swedish—Lund, Oscar A.C. (worked mainly in U.S.A.): When Pierrot Met Pierrette (1913); Sjöström, Victor (worked mainly in U.S.A.): He Who Gets Slapped (1924; based upon the 1914 play by Leonid Andreyev).

=== Visual arts ===
==== Works on canvas, paper, and board ====
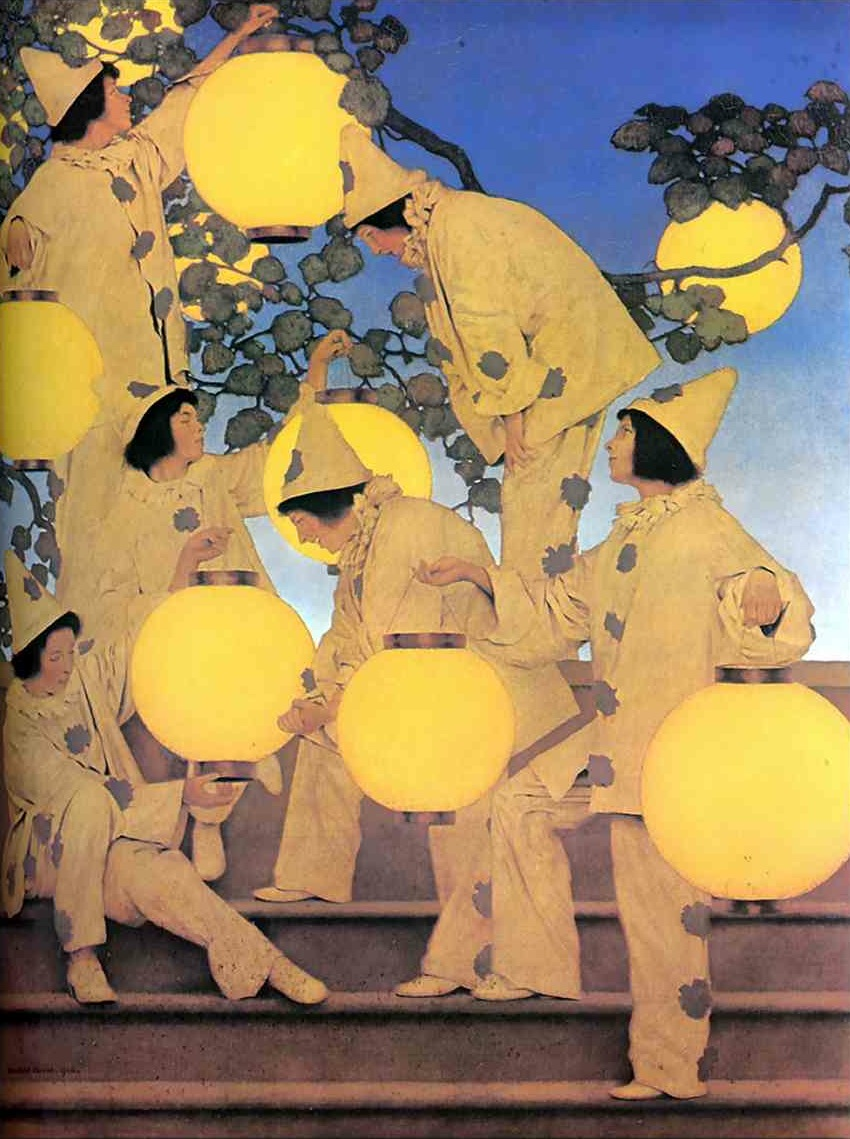
Maxfield Parrish: The Lantern-Bearers, 1908. Appeared as frontispiece of Collier's Weekly, December 10, 1910.

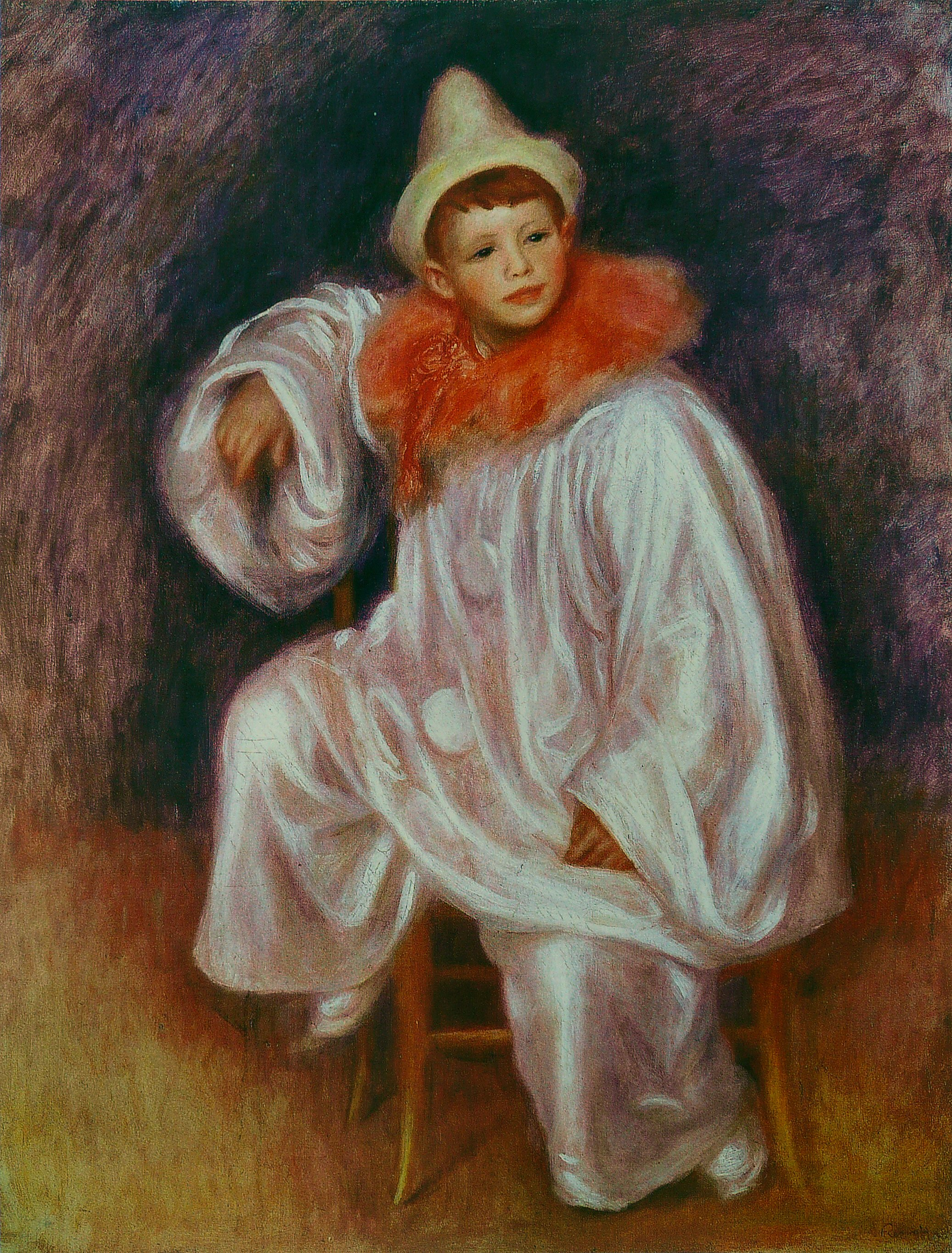
Pierre-Auguste Renoir: White Pierrot, 1901/1902. Detroit Institute of Arts, Detroit.

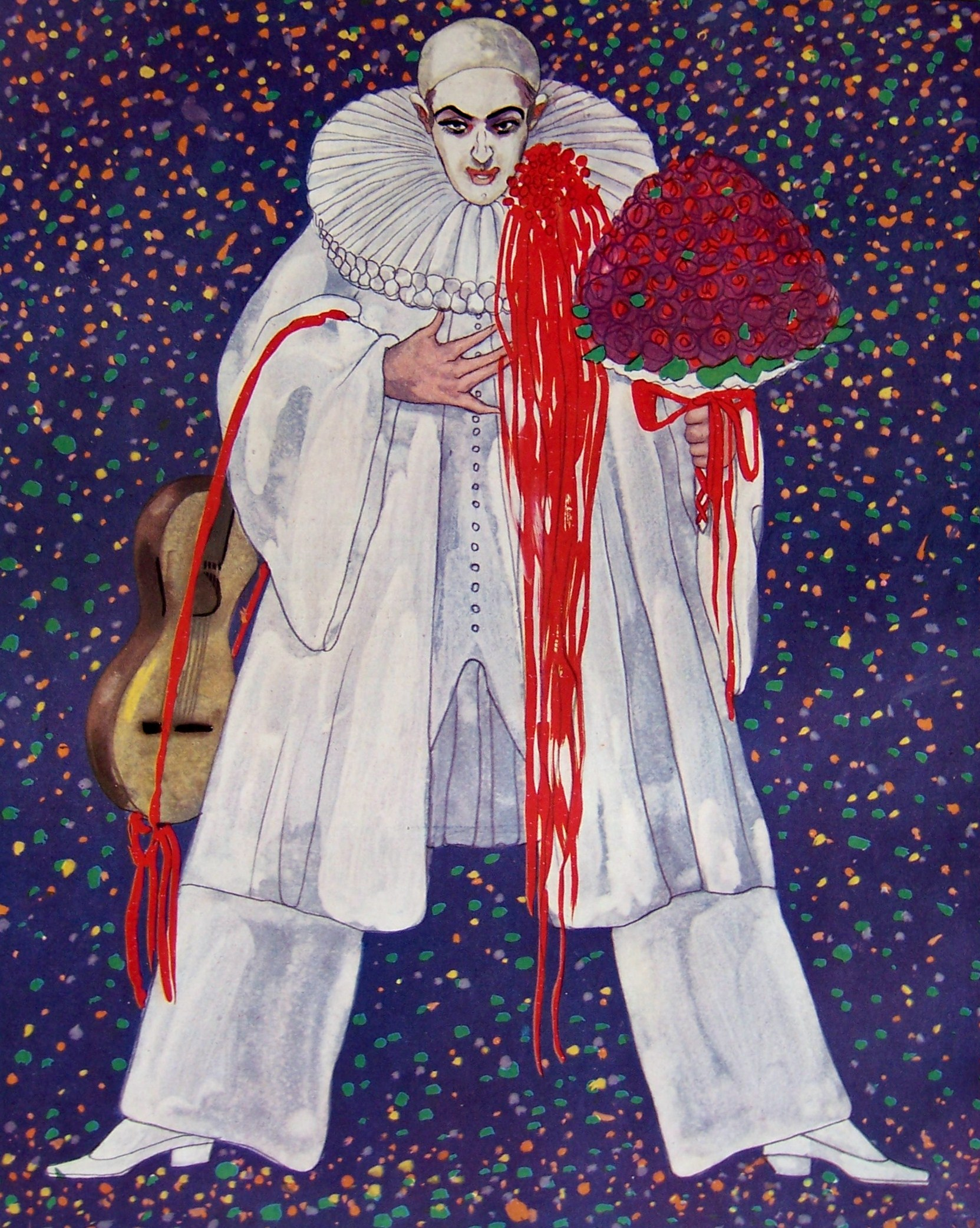
Leo Rauth: "A Welcome Guest", Illustrite Zeitung, February 15, 1912.

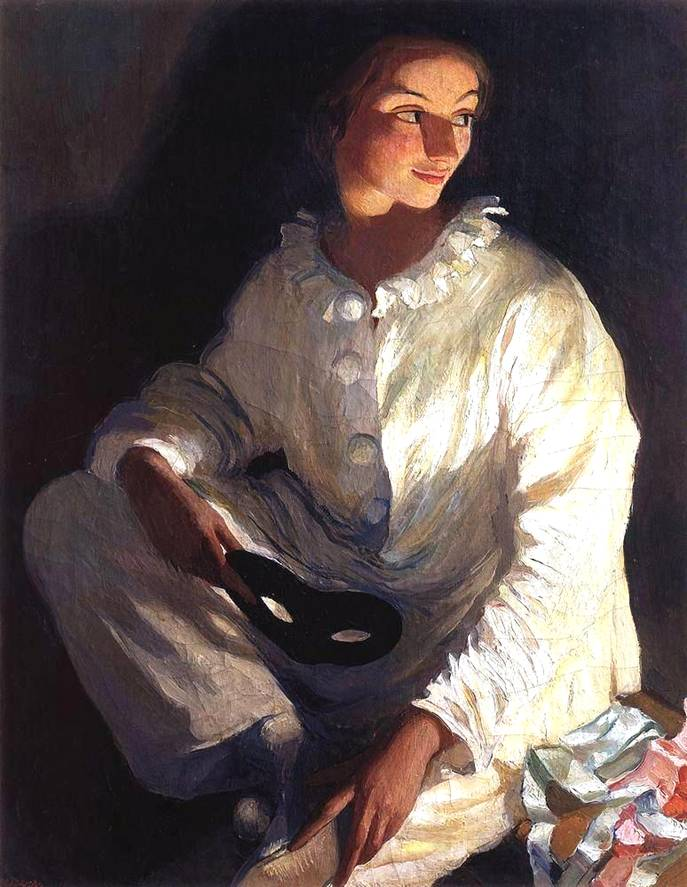
Zinaida Serebriakova: Self-Portrait as Pierrot, 1911. Odessa Art Museum.

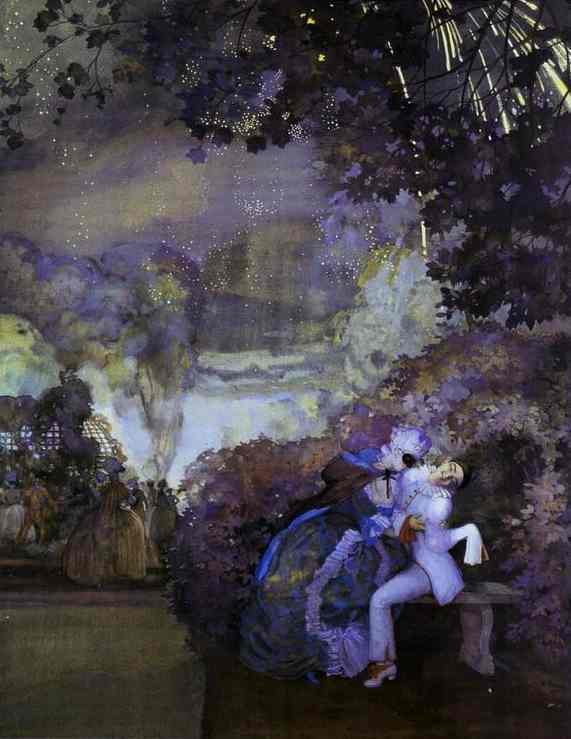
Konstantin Somov: Lady and Pierrot, 1910. Odessa Art Museum.

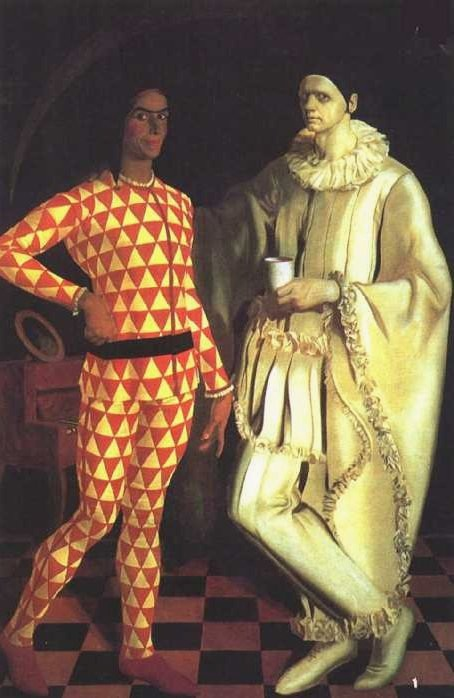
Vasilij Suhaev and Alexandre Yakovlev: Harlequin and Pierrot (Self-Portraits of and by Suhaev and A. Yakovlev), 1914. Russian Museum, St. Petersburg.

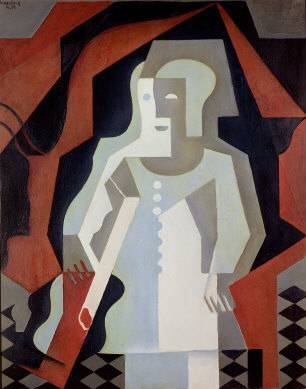
Juan Gris: Pierrot, 1919. Centre Georges Pompidou, Paris.

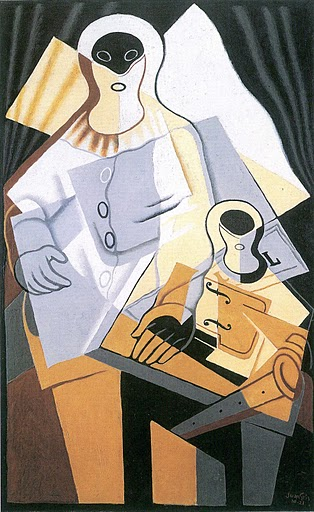
Gris: Pierrot, 1921. National Gallery of Ireland, Dublin.

- American—Bloch, Albert (worked mainly in Germany as member of Der Blaue Reiter): Many works, including Harlequinade (1911), Pierrot (1911); Piping Pierrot (1911), Harlequin and Pierrot (1913), Three Pierrots and Harlequin (1914); Bradley, Will: Various posters and illustrations (see, e.g., "Banning" under Poetry below); Heintzelman, Arthur William: Pierrot (n.d.); Hopper, Edward: Soir Bleu (1914); Kuhn, Walt: Portrait of the Artist as a Clown (1932), Study for Young Clown (1932), Clown in Blue (1933), Clown (1945); Parrish, Maxfield: Pierrot's Serenade (1908), The Lantern-Bearers (1908), Her Window (1922); Sloan, John: Old Clown Making Up (1910); Yasuo Kuniyoshi (born in Japan): The Clown (1948).
- Austrian—Eggeler, Stefan: Many works, including "Pierrot's Song of Love and Death" (#1 of Musical Miniatures [1921]), 6 lithographs in 1922 [German] ed. of Arthur Schnitzler's Veil of Pierrette (see above, under Plays, playlets, pantomimes, and revues), The Disappointed Lover (1922), On the Way Home (1922); Geiger, Richard (worked mainly in Hungary): Many works, including Columbine and Pierrot (1920), Duet (c. 1925), Pierrot and Columbine (1937); Kirchner, Raphael: The Loves of Pierrot (c. 1920); Kubin, Alfred: Death of Pierrot (1922); Schiele, Egon: Pierrot (Self-Portrait) (1914).
- Belgian—Ensor, James: Pierrot and Skeletons (1905), Pierrot and Skeletons (1907), Intrigued Masks (1930); Henrion, Armand: Series of self-portraits as Pierrot (1920s).
- Brazilian—Di Cavalcanti: Pierrot (1924).
- British—Armstrong, John: Veronica as a Clown (1950); Knight, Laura: Clown (n.d.); Sickert, Walter: Pierrot and Woman Embracing (1903–1904), Brighton Pierrots (1915; two versions).
- Canadian—Manigault, Edward Middleton (worked mainly in U.S.A.): The Clown (1912), Eyes of Morning (Nymph and Pierrot) (1913).
- Cuban—Beltrán Masses, Federico (worked in Spain): Azure Hour (1917), Sick Pierrot (1929).
- Czech—Kubišta, Bohumil: Pierrot (1911).
- Danish—Nielsen, Kay (worked in England 1911–16): Pierrot (c. 1911).
- French—Alleaume, Ludovic: Poor Pierrot (1915); Derain, André: Pierrot (1923–1924), Harlequin and Pierrot (c. 1924); Gabain, Ethel: Many works, including Pierrot (1916), Pierrot's Love-letter (1917), Unfaithful Pierrot (1919); La Fresnaye, Roger de: Study for "Pierrot" (1921); La Touche, Gaston de: Pierrot's Greeting (n.d.); Laurens, Henri: Pierrot (c. 1922); Matisse, Henri: The Burial of Pierrot (1943); Mossa, Gustav-Adolf: Pierrot and the Chimera (1906), Pierrot Takes His Leave (1906), Pierrot and His Doll (1907); Picabia, Francis: Pierrot (early 1930s), Hanged Pierrot (c. 1941); Renoir, Pierre-Auguste: White Pierrot (1901/1902); Rouault, Georges: Many works, including White Pierrot (1911), Pierrot (1920), Pierrot (1937–1938), Pierrot (or Pierrette) (1939), Aristocratic Pierrot (1942), The Wise Pierrot (1943), Blue Pierrots with Bouquet (c. 1946).
- German—Beckmann, Max: Pierrot and Mask (1920), Before the Masked Ball (1922), Carnival (1943); Campendonk, Heinrich: Pierrot with Mask (1916), Pierrot (with Serpent) (1923), Pierrot with Sunflower (1925); Dix, Otto: Masks in Ruins (1946); Erler, Fritz: Black Pierrot (1908); Faure, Amandus: Standing Artist and Pierrot (1909); Heckel, Erich: Dead Pierrot (1914); Hofer, Karl: Circus Folk (c. 1921), Masquerade a.k.a. Three Masks (1922); Leman, Ulrich: The Juggler (1913); Macke, August: Many works, including Ballets Russes (1912), Clown (Pierrot) (1913), Face of Pierrot (1913), Pierrot and Woman (1913); Mammen, Jeanne: The Death of Pierrot (n.d.); Nolde, Emil: Pierrot and White Lilies (c. 1911), Women and Pierrot (1917); Rauth, Leo: Many works, including Pierrot and Columbine (1911), A Welcome Guest (1912), Confession of Love (1912), In the Spotlight (1914); Schlemmer, Oskar: Pierrot and Two Figures (1923); Werner, Theodor: Pierrot lunaire (1942).
- Italian—Modigliani, Amedeo (worked mainly in France): Pierrot (1915); Severini, Gino: Many works, including The Two Pierrots (1922), Pierrot (1923), Pierrot the Musician (1924), The Music Lesson (1928–1929), The Carnival (1955).
- Mexican—Cantú, Federico: Many works, including The Death of Pierrot (1930–1934), Prelude to the Triumph of Death (1934), The Triumph of Death (1939); Clemente Orozco, José: The Clowns of War Arguing in Hell (1940s); Montenegro, Roberto: Skull Pierrot (1945); Zárraga, Ángel: Woman and Puppet (1909).
- Russian—Chagall, Marc (worked mainly in France): Pierrot with Umbrella (1926); Serebriakova, Zinaida: Self-Portrait as Pierrot (1911); Somov, Konstantin: Lady and Pierrot (1910), Curtain Design for Moscow Free Theater (1913), Italian Comedy (1914; two versions); Suhaev, Vasilij, and Alexandre Yakovlev: Harlequin and Pierrot (Self-Portraits of and by Suhaev and A. Yakovlev) (1914); Tchelitchew, Pavel (worked mainly in France and U.S.A.): Pierrot (1930).
- Spanish—Briones Carmona, Fernando: Melancholy Pierrot (1945); Dalí, Salvador: Pierrot's Love (c. 1905), Pierrot with Guitar (1924), Pierrot Playing the Guitar (1925); García Lorca, Federico: Pierrot lunar (1928); Gris, Juan (worked mainly in France): Many works, including Pierrot (1919), Pierrot (1921), Pierrot Playing Guitar (1923), Pierrot with Book (1924); Picasso, Pablo (worked mainly in France): Many works, including Pierrot (1918), Pierrot and Harlequin (1920), Three Musicians (1921; two versions), Portrait of Adolescent as Pierrot (1922), Paul as Pierrot (1925); Valle, Evaristo: Pierrot (1909).
- Swiss—Klee, Paul (worked mainly in Germany): Many works, including Head of a Young Pierrot (1912), Captive Pierrot (1923), Pierrot Lunaire (1924), Pierrot Penitent (1939); Menta, Edouard John: Pierrot's Dream (1908).
- Ukrainian—Andriienko-Nechytailo, Mykhailo (worked mainly in France): Pierrot with Heart (1921).

==== Sculptures and constructions ====
- American (U.S.A.)—Cornell, Joseph: A Dressing Room for Gilles (1939).
- French—Vermare, André-César: Pierrot (n.d.; terracotta).
- German—Hub, Emil: Pierrot (c. 1920; bronze).
- Lithuanian—Lipchitz, Jacques (worked mainly in France and U.S.A.): Pierrot (1909), Detachable Figure (Pierrot) (1915), Pierrot with Clarinet (1919), Seated Pierrot (1922), Pierrot (1925), Pierrot with Clarinet (1926), Pierrot Escapes (1927).
- Ukrainian—Archipenko, Alexander (worked mainly in France and U.S.A.): Carrousel Pierrot (1913), Pierrot (1942); Ekster, Aleksandra (worked mainly in France): Pierrot (1926).

=== Literature ===
==== Poetry ====
- American (U.S.A.)—Akins, Zoë: "Pierrot and the Parasol" (1912), "Pierrot and the Peacock's Feather" (1917); Banning, Kendall, ed.: Mon Ami Pierrot: Songs and Fantasies (1917; frontispiece by Will Bradley); Beswick, Katherine: Columbine Wonders and Other Poems (c. 1920); Bodenheim, Maxwell: "Pierrot Objects" (1920); Branch, Anna Hempstead: "The Theatre-Curtain" (1905); Breed, Ida Marian: Poems for Pierrot (1939); Burt, Maxwell Struthers: "Pierrot at War" (1916); Burton, Richard: "Here Lies Pierrot" (1913); Chaplin, Ralph: Maybe, Pierrot ... (c. 1918); Crane, Hart: "The Moth That God Made Blind" (c. 1918, pub. 1966); Crapsey, Adelaide: "Pierrot" (c. 1914); Faulkner, William: Vision in Spring (1921, pub. 1984); Ficke, Arthur Davison: "A Watteau Melody" (1913); Garrison, Theodosia: "At Columbine's Window" (1902), "The Memories of Pierrot" (1906), "Good-Bye, Pierrette" (1910), "Monseigneur Plays" (1911), "When Pierrot Passes" (1913); Griffith, William: Loves and Losses of Pierrot (1916), Three Poems: Pierrot, the Conjurer, Pierrot Dispossesed [sic], The Stricken Pierrot (1923); Hughes, Langston: "A Black Pierrot" (1923), "Pierrot" (1926), "For Dead Mimes" (1926), "Heart" (1932); Johns, Orrick: "The Last Poet" (1917); Loveman, Samuel: "In Pierrot's Garden" (1911; five poems); Lowell, Amy: "Stravinsky's Three Pieces: "Grotesques", for string quartet" (1916); Masters, Edgar Lee: "Poor Pierrot" (1918); Moore, Marianne: "To Pierrot Returning to His Orchid" (c. 1910); Shelley, Melvin Geer: "Pierrot" (1940); Stevens, Wallace: "Pierrot" (1909, first pub. 1967 [in Buttel]); Taylor, Dwight: Some Pierrots Come from behind the Moon (1923); Teasdale, Sara: "Pierrot" (1911), "Pierrot's Song" (1915), "The Rose" (1915); Underwood, Wilbur: A Book of Masks (1907); Viereck, George Sylvester: "Pierrot Crucified" (1916); Widdemer, Margaret: "The Song of Pierrot" (1915).
- Argentinian—Lugones, Leopoldo: Lunario sentimental (1909).
- Australian—Gard'ner, Dorothy M.: Pierrot and Other Poems (1916).
- Austrian—Schaukal, Richard von: Pierrot and Columbine, or The Marriage Song. A Roundelay ... (1902).
- British—Becker, Charlotte: "Pierrot Goes" (1918); Christie, Agatha: A Masque from Italy (1925); Coward, Noël: "Pierrot and Pierrette" (1915, first pub. 2012); Drinkwater, John: "Pierrot" (c. 1910); Foss, Kenelm: The Dead Pierrot (1920); Rodker, John: "The Dutch Dolls" (1915).
- Canadian—Carman, Bliss: "Pierrot's House" (1901), "Pierrot in Autumn" (1901), "At Columbine's Grave" (1902), "The Book of Pierrot", from Poems (1904, 1905).
- Dutch—Nijhoff, Martinus: "Pierrot" (1916).
- Estonian—Semper, Johannes: Pierrot (1917).
- French—Fourest, Georges: "The Blonde Negress" (1909); Klingsor, Tristan: "By Moonlight" (1908), "At the Fountain" (1913); Magre, Maurice: "The Two Pierrots" (1913); Rouault, Georges: Funambules (1926).
- German—Gleichen-Russwurm, Alexander von: Pierrot: A Parable in Seven Songs (1914); Günter, Marie-Madeleine: "Black Pierrot" (1905); Presber, Rudolf: Pierrot: A Songbook (1920).
- Jamaican—Roberts, Walter Adolphe: Pierrot Wounded, and Other Poems (1919).
- New Zealander—Hyde, Robin: "Pierrette" (1925), "The Dying Pierrot" (1927).
- Puerto Rican—Nicolás Blanco, Antonio: Pierrot's Garden (1914).
- Russian—Akhmatova, Anna: Poem without a Hero (Part I: "The Year Nineteen Thirteen", written 1941, pub. 1960); Blok, Alexander: "The Puppet Show", "The Light Wandered about in the Window", "The Puppet Booth", "In the Hour when the Narcissus Flowers Drink Hard", "He Appeared at a Smart Ball", "Double" (1902–1905; series related to Blok's play The Puppet Show [see under Plays, playlets, pantomimes, and revues above]); Guro, Elena: "Boredom" and "Lunar", from The Hurdy-Gurdy (1909); Kuzmin, Mikhail Alekseevich: "Where will I find words" (1906), "In sad and pale make-up" (1912).
- Spanish—Carrere, Emilio: "End of Carnival" (1919); Champourcin, Ernestina de: "Romantic Carnival" (1926); García Lorca, Federico: "Pierrot: Intimate Poem" (1918); Machado, Manuel: Caprices (1905).
- Ukrainian—Semenko, Mykhaylo: Pierrot Loves (1918), Pierrot Puts on Airs (1918), Pierrot Deadnooses (1919).

==== Fiction ====
- American (U.S.A.)—Carryl, Guy Wetmore: "Caffiard, Deus ex Machina" (1902; originally "Pierrot and Pierrette").
- Austrian—Musil, Robert: The Man Without Qualities (1930, 1933, 1943; when main character, Ulrich, meets twin sister, Agatha, for first time after their father's death, they are both dressed as Pierrots).
- British—Ashton, Helen: Pierrot in Town (1913); Baring, Maurice: "Fête Galante", from Orpheus in Mayfair (1909); Barrington, Pamela: White Pierrot (1932); Callaghan, Stella: "Pierrot and the Black Cat" (1921), Pierrot of the World (1923); Deakin, Dorothea: The Poet and the Pierrot (1905); Herring, Paul: The Pierrots on the Pier: A Holiday Entertainment (1914); MacKenzie, Compton: The Early Life and Adventures of Sylvia Scarlett (1918; features Pierrot troupe called The Pink Pierrots); Priestley, J.B.: The Good Companions (1929; plot follows fortunes of a Pierrot troupe, The Dinky Doos; has had many adaptations for stage, screen, TV, and radio).
- Czech—Kožík, František: The Greatest of the Pierrots (1939; novel about J.-G. Deburau).
- French—Alain-Fournier: Le Grand Meaulnes a.k.a. The Wanderer (1913; Ganache the Pierrot is an important symbolic figure); Champsaur, Félicien: Lulu (1901), Le Jazz des Masques (1928); Gyp: Mon ami Pierrot (1921); Queneau, Raymond: Pierrot mon ami (1942); Rivollet, Georges: "The Pierrot" (1914).
- Guatemalan—Gómez Carrillo, Enrique: Bohemia sentimental (1919).
- Mexican—Couto Castillo, Bernardo: "Pierrot-Gravedigger" (1901).
- Russian/Soviet—Tolstoy, Aleksey Nicolayevich: The Golden Key, or The Adventures of Buratino (1936; children's book inspired by The Adventures of Pinocchio; basis of several films, including an animated version of 1959 and a live-action version of 1976).

=== Music ===
==== Songs and song-cycles ====
- American (U.S.A.)—Goetzl, Anselm: "Pierrot's Serenade" (1915; voice and piano; text by Frederick H. Martens); Hoiby, Lee: "Pierrot" (1950; #2 of Night Songs for voice and piano; text by Adelaide Crapsey [see above under Poetry]); Johnston, Jesse: "Pierrot: Trio for Women's Voices" (1911; vocal trio and piano); Kern, Jerome: "Poor Pierrot" (1931; voice and orchestra; lyrics by Otto Harbach). For settings of poems by Langston Hughes and Sara Teasdale, see also these notes.
- British—Coward, Sir Noël: "Parisian Pierrot" (1922; voice and orchestra); Scott, Cyril: "Pierrot amoureux" (1912; voice and piano), "Pierrot and the Moon Maiden" (1912; voice and piano; text by Ernest Dowson from Pierrot of the Minute [see above under England]); Shaw, Martin: "At Columbine's Grave" (1922; voice and piano; lyrics by Bliss Carman [see above under Poetry]).
- French—Lannoy, Robert: "Pierrot the Street-Waif" (1938; choir with mixed voices and piano; text by Paul Verlaine); Poulenc, Francis: "Pierrot" (1933; voice and piano; text by Théodore de Banville); Privas, Xavier: Many works, in both Chansons vécues (1903; "Unfaithful Pierrot", "Pierrot Sings", etc.; voice and piano; texts by composer) and Chanson sentimentale (1906; "Pierrot's All Hallows", "Pierrot's Heart", etc.; voice and piano; texts by composer); Rhynal, Camille de: "The Poor Pierrot" (1906; voice and piano; text by R. Roberts).
- German—Künneke, Eduard: [Five] Songs of Pierrot (1911; voice and piano; texts by Arthur Kahane).
- Italian—Bixio, Cesare Andrea: "So Cries Pierrot" (1925; voice and piano; text by composer); Bussotti, Sylvano: "Pierrot" (1949; voice and harp).
- Japanese—Osamu Shimizu: Moonlight and Pierrot Suite (1948/49; male chorus; text by Horiguchi Daigaku).
- See also Pierrot lunaire below.

==== Instrumental works (solo and ensemble) ====
- American (U.S.A.)—Abelle, Victor: "Pierrot and Pierrette" (1906; piano); Neidlinger, William Harold: Piano Sketches (1905; #5: "Pierrot"; #7: "Columbine"); Oehmler, Leo: "Pierrot and Pierrette – Petite Gavotte" (1905; violin and piano).
- Belgian—Strens, Jules: "Mon ami Pierrot" (1926; piano).
- British—Scott, Cyril: "Two Pierrot Pieces" (1904; piano), "Pierrette" (1912; piano).
- Brazilian—Nazareth, Ernesto: "Pierrot" (1914; piano: Brazilian tango).
- Czech—Martinů, Bohuslav: "Pierrot's Serenade", from Marionettes, III (c. 1913, pub. 1923; piano).
- French—Audan, Marguerite: "Pierrot and Pierrette" (1901; piano); Debussy, Claude: Sonata for Cello and Piano (1915; Debussy had considered calling it "Pierrot angry at the moon"); Popy, Francis: Pierrot Sleeps (n.d.; violin and piano); Salzedo, Carlos (worked mainly in U.S.A.): "Pierrot is Sad", from Sketches for Harpist Beginners, Series II (1942; harp); Satie, Erik: "Pierrot's Dinner" (1909; piano).
- German—Bohm, Carl: Carnival (1907; #6: "Pierrot and Columbine"; piano); Kaun, Hugo: Pierrot and Columbine: Four Episodes (1907; piano).
- Hungarian—Vecsey, Franz von: "Pierrot's Grief" (1933; violin and piano).
- Italian—Drigo, Riccardo (worked mainly in Russia): "Pierrot's Song: Chanson-Serenade for Piano" (1922); Pierrot and Columbine" (1929; violin and piano). These pieces are re-workings of the famous "Serenade" from his score for the ballet Les Millions d'Arlequin (see Russia above).
- Swiss—Bachmann, Alberto: Children's Scenes (1906; #2: "Little Pierrot"; violin and piano).

==== Works for orchestra ====
- American (U.S.A.)—Thompson, Randall: Pierrot and Cothurnus (1922; prelude to Edna St. Vincent Millay's Aria da Capo [see under Plays, Playlets, and Pantomimes above]).
- Austrian—Zeisl, Erich: Pierrot in the Bottle: Ballet-Suite (1935; ballet itself [1929] remains unperf.).
- British—Bantock, Sir Granville: Pierrot of the Minute: Overture to a Dramatic Fantasy of Ernest Dowson (1908; see under England above); Holbrooke, Joseph Charles: Ballet Suite #1, "Pierrot", for String and Full Orchestra (1909).
- French—Popy, Francis: Pierrot's Secret (n.d.; overture).
- German—Reger, Max: A Ballet-Suite for Orchestra (1913; #4: "Pierrot and Pierrette").
- Hungarian—Lehár, Franz: "Pierrot and Pierrette" (1911; waltz).
- Italian—Masetti, Enzo: Contrasts (1927; part 1: "Pierrot's Night").
- Russian—Pingoud, Ernest (worked mainly in Finland): Pierrot's Last Adventure (1916).

==== Operas, operettas, and zarzuelas ====
- American (U.S.A.)—Barlow II, Samuel Latham Mitchell: Mon Ami Pierrot (1934; libretto by Sacha Guitry).
- Austrian—Berg, Alban: Lulu (unfinished; first perf. 1937; libretto by composer, adapted from "Lulu" plays of Frank Wedekind [see under Germany above]); Korngold, Erich Wolfgang: Die tote Stadt (The Dead City [1920]; libretto by composer and Paul Schott; actor Fritz banters and sings in the guise and costume of Pierrot—an ironic counterpart to the lovelorn main character, Paul).
- Belgian—Dell'Acqua, Eva: Pierrot the Liar (1918); Renieu, Lionel: The Chimera, or Pierrot the Alchemist (1926; libretto by Albert Nouveau and Fortuné Paillot).
- British—Holbrooke, Joseph Charles: Pierrot and Pierrette (1909; libretto by Walter E. Grogan); Smyth, Ethel: Fête Galante (1923; based on the short story by Maurice Baring [see Fiction (British) above]).
- German—Goetze, Walter: The Golden Pierrot (1934; libretto by Oskar Felix and Otto Kleinert).
- Hungarian—Hajos, Karl: The Black Pierrot (1922; libretto by Fritz Löhner-Beda); Lehár, Franz: The Count from Luxembourg (1909; libretto by A. M. Willner, Robert Bodanzky, and Leo Stein; with roles for Pierrot and Pierrette).
- Italian—Menotti, Gian Carlo: The Death of Pierrot (1923; written by Menotti, including libretto, when he was age 11, in the same year he entered the Milan Conservatory for formal training).
- Peruvian—Sassone, Felipe (of Italian origin; worked in Spain): Pierrot's Song (1912; music by José Palacios).
- Spanish—Barrera Saavedra, Tomás: Pierrot's Dream (1914; libretto by Luis Pascual Frutos); Chapí, Ruperto: The Tragedy of Pierrot (1904; libretto by Ramón Asensio Más and José Juan Cadenas); Fernández-Shaw, Guillermo, and Rafael Fernández-Shaw: Pierrot (late 1940s; music by Victorino Echevarría López).

== Late twentieth/early twenty-first centuries (1951– ): notable works ==
In the latter half of the twentieth century, Pierrot continued to appear in the art of the Modernists—or at least of the long-lived among them: Chagall, Ernst, Goleminov, Hopper, Miró, Picasso—as well as in the work of their younger followers, such as Gerard Dillon, Indrek Hirv, and Roger Redgate. And when film arrived at a pinnacle of auteurism in the 1950s and '60s, aligning it with the earlier Modernist aesthetic, some of its most celebrated directors—Bergman, Fellini, Godard—turned naturally to Pierrot.

But Pierrot's most prominent place in the late twentieth century, as well as in the early twenty-first, has been in popular, not High Modernist, art. As the entries below tend to testify, Pierrot is most visible (as in the eighteenth century) in unapologetically popular genres—in circus acts and street-mime sketches, TV programs and Japanese anime, comic books and graphic novels, children's books and young adult fiction (especially fantasy and, in particular, vampire fiction), Hollywood films, and pop and rock music. He generally assumes one of three avatars: the sweet and innocent child (as in the children's books), the poignantly lovelorn and ineffectual being (as, notably, in the Jerry Cornelius novels of Michael Moorcock), or the somewhat sinister and depraved outsider (as in David Bowie's various experiments, or Rachel Caine's vampire novels, or the S&M lyrics of the English rock group Placebo).

The format of the lists that follow is the same as that of the previous section, except for the Western pop-music singers and groups. These are listed alphabetically by first name, not last (e.g., "Stevie Wonder", not "Wonder, Stevie").

=== Non-operatic works for stage and screen ===
==== Plays, pantomimes, variety shows, circus, and dance ====
- American—Balanchine, George (born in Russia): Harlequin (1965; revival of ballet Harlequin's Millions [see Russia above]); Craton, John: Pierrot and Pierrette a.k.a. Le Mime solitaire (2009; ballet); Muller, Jennifer (head of three-member Works Dance Company, New York): Pierrot (1986; music and scenario by Thea Musgrave [see below under Western classical and jazz: Instrumental]); Russillo, Joseph (works mainly in France): Pierrot (1975; ballet); Totheroh, Dan: The Masque of Pierrot: A Masque in One Act (1967); Wilson, Robert: Letter to a Man (2015; "a sort of vaudeville show, a series of acts, most of them featuring Nijinsky-Baryshnikov"—i.e., the character Vaslav Nijinsky played by Mikhail Baryshnikov—"in a tuxedo and elaborate whiteface: the face of Pierrot, of Petrushka ...").
- British—Littlewood, Joan, and the Theatre Workshop: Oh, What a Lovely War! (1963; a musical satire on World War I played in Pierrot costumes); Wilson, Ronald Smith: Harlequin, Pierrot & Co. (1976).
- Canadian—Cirque du Soleil (performs internationally): Corteo (2005–present; Pierrot appears as "White Clown"), La Nouba (1998–present; features a Pierrot Rouge [or "Acrobatic Pierrot"] and a Pierrot Clown).
- Cuban—Morejón, Nancy: Pierrot and the Moon (1999).
- Czech—Fialka, Ladislav: Mime who created clown personae modeled after Marcel Marceau, Pierrot, and a Chaplinesque whiteface figure wearing a bow tie and straw hat. In 1953–1954, he staged pantomimic dances based on Pierrot playlets enacted by Jean-Gaspard Deburau. After meeting Marceau in Paris in 1956, he founded, two years later, his own pantomime company and began producing revue/cabaret pantomime shows in which the action revolved around his clown characters. In 1977, he staged Funambules, scenes based upon the life of Deburau.
- French—Marceau, Marcel: Pierrot of Montmartre (1952; inspired by black-suited Pierrot of Adolphe Willette; music by Joseph Kosma); The Mime Sime: The Fantasies of Pierrot (2007).
- German—König, Rainer: Pierrot's Version: A Mime Breaks His Silence (n.d.); Lemke, Joachim: Pierrot for a Moment (n.d.); Le Pustra (performs internationally): self-styled "Vaudeville's Darkest Muse" (2006–present).
- Irish—See Clarke, Austin, above, under Plays, playlets, pantomimes, and revues: Irish.
- Russian—Pimonenko, Evgeny (performs internationally): Your Pierrot (c. 1994–present; act by black-suited Pierrot-juggler-equilibrist, originally of Valentin Gneushev's Cirk Valentin).
- Swedish—Cramér, Ivo: Pierrot in the Dark (1982; ballet).
- Swiss—Pic (Richard Hirzel): Pierrot clown famously associated, from 1980, with the German Circus Roncalli.
- See also Pierrot lunaire below.

==== Films and television ====
- American—Anger, Kenneth: Rabbit's Moon (1950 film released in 1972, revised 1979); Irwin, Bill: The Circus (1990 TV movie based on short story by Katherine Anne Porter); Kelly, Gene: Invitation to the Dance (1956 film; Kelly appears as Pierrot in opening ["Circus"] segment); Wise, Robert: Star! (1968 film; main character Gertrude Lawrence, played by Julie Andrews dressed as Pierrot, sings Noël Coward's "Parisian Pierrot"—as Lawrence herself did in Coward's review London Calling! [1923], for which the song was written).
- British—Graham, Matthew, and Ashley Pharaoh: Ashes to Ashes (2008 TV series; main character, Alex Drake, is haunted by Pierrot like that in David Bowie video Ashes to Ashes); Mahoney, Brian: Pierrot in Turquoise or The Looking Glass Murders (1970 film written and performed by David Bowie and Lindsay Kemp, adapted from their stage-play of the same title [1967] and produced by Scottish Television [see also Songs, albums, and rock musicals below]); The Affair at the Victory Ball (March 3, 1991 episode of Agatha Christie's Poirot).
- Canadian/German—LaBruce, Bruce: Pierrot Lunaire (2014 film).
- French—Albicocco, Jean-Gabriel: Le Grand Meaulnes a.k.a. The Wanderer (1967 film; based upon the Alain-Fournier novel [see above under Fiction]); Godard, Jean-Luc: Pierrot le fou (Pierrot the Fool [1965 film]).
- Italian—Cavani, Liliana: The Night Porter (1974 film; Pierrot motifs are abundant—from the Nazi ballet-dancer Bert, who assumes the role of a Pierrot-like character [pale, effeminate, occasionally seen either in a white shirt or in a black cap], to the characters in the singing scene, some of which [both Nazis and prisoners] wear frilled collars or white masks); Fellini, Federico: The Clowns (1970 film).
- Japanese—Shinichiro Watanabe: Cowboy Bebop (1998 anime; twentieth episode, "Pierrot le fou", references both the character and the Godard film [see above, this section, under French]); Shōji Yonemura: Smile PreCure! (2012 anime; King Pierrot of the Bad End Kingdom is the primary antagonist; the series was adapted into English as Glitter Force by Netflix in 2015). See also "Japanese (manga)" under Comic books.
- Russian—Nechayev, Leonid: The Adventures of Buratino (1976; Pierrot appears singing and playing the mandolin).
- Swedish—Bergman, Ingmar: In the Presence of a Clown (1997 film for TV; the Pierrot-like—yet female—Rigmor, the clown of the title, is an important symbolic figure).

=== Visual arts ===
- American (U.S.A.)—Dellosso, Gabriela Gonzalez: Many works, most notably Garrik (n.d.); Hopper, Edward: Two Comedians (1966); Longo, Robert: Pressure (1982/83); Nauman, Bruce: No No New Museum (1987; videotape); Serrano, Andres: A History of Sex (Head) (1996).
- Argentinian—Ortolan, Marco: Venetian Clown (n.d.); Soldi, Raúl: Pierrot (1969), Three Pierrots (n.d.).
- Austrian—Absolon, Kurt: Cycle of Pierrot works (1951).
- British—Hockney, David: Troop of Actors and Acrobats (1980; one of stage designs for Satie's Parade [see under Ballet, cabaret, and Pierrot troupes above]), paintings on Munich museum walls for group exhibition on Pierrot (1995); Self, Colin: Pierrot Blowing Dandelion Clock (1997).
- Chilean—Bravo, Claudio: The Ladies and the Pierrot (1963).
- Colombian—Botero, Fernando: Pierrot (2007), Pierrot lunaire (2007), Blue Pierrot (2007), White Pierrot (2008).
- German—Alt, Otmar: Pierrot (n.d.).; Ernst, Max (worked mainly in France): Mon ami Pierrot (1974); Lüpertz, Markus: Pierrot lunaire: Chair (1984).
- Italian—Barnabè, Duilio (worked mainly in France): Pierrot (1960).
- Irish—Dillon, Gerard: Many works, including Bird and Bird Canvas (c. 1958), And the Time Passes (1962), The Brothers (1967), Beginnings (1968), Encounter (c. 1968), Red Nude with Loving Pierrot (c. 1970); Robinson, Markey: Many works.
- Russian—Chagall, Marc (worked mainly in France): Circus Scene (late 1960s/early 1970s), Pierrot lunaire (1969).
- Spanish—Miró, Joan (worked mainly in France and U.S.A.): Pierrot le fou (1964); Picasso, Pablo (worked mainly in France): Many works, including Pierrot with Newspaper and Bird (1969), various versions of Pierrot and Harlequin (1970, 1971), and metal cut-outs: Head of Pierrot (c. 1961), Pierrot (1961); Roig, Bernardí: Pierrot le fou (2009; polyester and neon lighting); Ruiz-Pipó, Manolo: Many works, including Orlando (Young Pierrot) (1978), Pierrot Lunaire (n.d.), Lunar Poem (n.d.).
- Commercial art. A variety of Pierrot-themed items, including figurines, jewelry, posters, and bedclothes, are sold commercially.

=== Literature ===
==== Poetry ====
- American (U.S.A.)—Hecht, Anthony: "Clair de lune" (before 1977); Koestenbaum, Wayne: Pierrot Lunaire (2006; ten original poems with titles from the Giraud/Schoenberg cycle in Koestenbaum's Best-Selling Jewish Porn Films [2006]); Nyhart, Nina: "Captive Pierrot" (1988; after the Paul Klee painting); Peachum, Jack: "Our Pierrot in Autumn" (2008).
- British—Moorcock, Michael: "Pierrot on the Moon" (1987); Smart, Harry: "The Pierrot" (1991).
- Estonian—Hirv, Indrek: The Star Beggar (1993).
- French—Butor, Michel and Michel Launay: Pierrot Lunaire (1982; retranslation into French of Hartleben's 21 poems used by Schoenberg [see Pierrot lunaire below], followed by original poems by Butor and Launay).
- Italian—Brancaccio, Carmine: The Pierrot Quatrains (2007).
- New Zealander—Sharp, Iain: The Pierrot Variations (1985).

==== Fiction ====
- American (U.S.A.)—Caine, Rachel: Feast of Fools (Morganville Vampires, Book 4) (2008; vampire Myrnin dresses as Pierrot); Dennison, George: "A Tale of Pierrot" (1987); dePaola, Tomie: Sing, Pierrot, Sing: A Picture Book in Mime (1983; children's book, illustrated by the author); Hoban, Russell (has lived in England since 1969): Crocodile and Pierrot: A See-the-Story Book (1975; children's book, illustrated by Sylvie Selig).
- Austrian—Frischmuth, Barbara: From the Life of Pierrot (1982).
- Belgian—Norac, Carl: Pierrot d'amour (2002; children's book, illustrated by Jean-Luc Englebert).
- Brazilian—Antunes, Ana Claudia: The Pierrot's Love (2009).
- British—Gaiman, Neil (has lived in U.S.A. since 1992): "Harlequin Valentine" (1999), Harlequin Valentine (2001; graphic novel, illustrated by John Bolton); Greenland, Colin: "A Passion for Lord Pierrot" (1990); Moorcock, Michael: The English Assassin and The Condition of Muzak (1972, 1977; hero Jerry Cornelius morphs into role of Pierrot), "Feu Pierrot" (1978); Stevenson, Helen: Pierrot Lunaire (1995).
- Canadian—Major, Henriette: The Vampire and the Pierrot (2000; children's book); Laurent McAllister: "Le Pierrot diffracté" ("The Diffracted Pierrot" [1992]).
- French—Boutet, Gérard: Pierrot and the Secret of the Flint Stones (1999; children's book, illustrated by Jean-Claude Pertuzé); Dodé, Antoine: Pierrot Lunaire (2011; vol. 1 of projected graphic-novel trilogy, images by the author); Tournier, Michel: "Pierrot, or The Secrets of the Night" (1978).
- Japanese—Kōtaro Isaka: A Pierrot a.k.a. Gravity Clown (2003; a film based on the novel was released in 2009).
- Polish—Lobel, Anita (naturalized U.S. citizen 1956): Pierrot's ABC Garden (1992; children's book, illustrated by author).
- Russian—Baranov, Dimitri: Black Pierrot (1991).
- South Korean—Jung Young-moon: Moon-sick Pierrot (2013).
- Spanish—Francés, Victoria: Misty Circus 1: Sasha, the Little Pierrot (2009; children's book, illustrated by author; a sequel, Misty Circus 2: the Night of the Witches, appeared in 2010).

==== Comic books ====
- American (U.S.A.)—DC Comics: Batman R.I.P.: Midnight in the House of Hurt (2008 [#676]; features Pierrot Lunaire—who subsequently appears in ten other issues).
- Japanese (manga)—Katsura Hoshino: D. Gray-man, serialized in Weekly Shōnen Jump, Jump Square, Jump SQ.Crown, and Jump SQ.Rise (2004–present; main character, Allen Walker, is "the pierrot who will cause the akuma [i.e., demons] to fall"; anime based on manga released 2006–2008); Takashi Hashiguchi: Yakitate!! Japan (Freshly Baked!! Japan [Jap. pan = bread]), serialized in Shogakukan's Shōnen Sunday (2002–2007; features a clown-character named Pierrot Bolneze, heir to the throne of Monaco; anime based on manga released 2004–2006).

=== Music ===
==== Western classical and jazz ====
Vocal

- American (U.S.A.)—Austin, Larry: Variations: Beyond Pierrot (1995; voice, small ensemble, live computer-processed sound, and computer-processed prerecorded tape); Fairouz, Mohammed: Pierrot Lunaire (2013; tenor and Pierrot ensemble; texts by Wayne Koestenbaum [see above under Poetry]); Hoiby, Lee: "Pierrot" (1996; #2 in Night Songs: Four Poems of Adelaide Crapsey [see above under Poetry]). For settings of poems by Langston Hughes and Sara Teasdale, click on the notes following their poems' titles in Poetry: American above.
- British—Christie, Michael: "Pierrot" (1998; voice and small ensemble; text by John Drinkwater [see above under Poetry]); St. Johanser, Joe: "Pierrot" (2003; from song-cycle Pierrot Alone; voice and chamber orchestra; text by John Drinkwater [see above under Poetry]).
- Polish—Szczeniowski, Boleslaw (worked mainly in Canada): "Pierrot" (1958; voice; text by Wilfrid Lemoine).
- Japanese—Norio Suzuki: "Pierrot Clown" (1995; women's chorus).

Instrumental

- American (U.S.A.)—Brown, Earle: Tracking Pierrot (1992; chamber ensemble); DeNizio, John: a number of LPs and EPs of experimental/drone music released under the moniker "Pierrot Lunaire" (2011– ); Lewis, John: "Two Lyric Pieces: Pierrot/Columbine", from album The John Lewis Piano (1957; piano and guitar); Rorem, Ned: Bright Music: Pierrot (1987; flute, two violins, cello, and piano); Wharton, Geoffry (works mainly in Germany): Five Pierrot Tangos (n.d.; violin/viola, flute, piano/synthesizer, cello, clarinet, and voice).
- Argentinian—Franzetti, Carlos: Pierrot and Columbine (2012; small ensemble and string orchestra).
- Austrian—Herf, Franz Richter: "Pierrot" (1955; piano).
- British—Beamish, Sally: Commedia (1990; mixed quintet; theater piece without actors, in which Pierrot is portrayed by violin); Biberian, Gilbert: Variations and Fugue on "Au Clair de la Lune" (1967; wind quartet), Pierrot: A Ballet (1978; guitar duo); Hackett, Steve: "Pierrot", from Momentum (1988; guitar); Kinsey, Tony: "Pierrot" (1955; Quartet Le Sage); Musgrave, Thea: Pierrot (1985; for clarinet [Columbine], violin [Pierrot], and piano [Harlequin]; inspired dance by Jennifer Muller [see above under Plays, pantomimes, variety shows, circus, and dance]); Redgate, Roger: Pierrot on the Stage of Desire (1998; for Pierrot ensemble).
- Bulgarian—Goleminov, Marin: "Pierrot", from Five Impressions (1959; piano).
- Canadian—Longtin, Michel: The Death of Pierrot (1972; tape-recorder).
- Dutch—Boer, Eduard de (a.k.a. Alexander Comitas): Pierrot: Scherzo for String Orchestra (1992).
- Finnish—Tuomela, Tapio: Pierrot: Quintet No. 2 for Flute, Clarinet, Violin, Cello, and Piano (2004).
- French—Duhamel, Antoine: Pierrot le fou: Four Pieces for Orchestra (1965/66); Françaix, Jean: Pierrot, or The Secrets of the Night (1980; ballet, libretto by Michel Tournier; see above under Fiction); Lancen, Serge: Mascarade: For Brass Quintet and Wind Orchestra (1986; #3: "Pierrot"); Naulais, Jérôme: The Moods of Pierrot (n.d.; flute and piano).
- German—Kirchner, Volker David: Pierrot's Gallows Songs (2001; clarinet); Kühmstedt, Paul: Dance-Visions: Burlesque Suite (1978; #3: "Pierrot and Pierrette").
- Hungarian—Papp, Lajos: Pierrot Dreams: Four Pieces for Accordion (1993).
- Italian—Guarnieri, Adriano: Pierrot Suite (1980; three chamber ensembles), Pierrot Pierrot! (1980; flutes, celesta, percussion); Paradiso, Michele: Pierrot: Ballet for Piano (in Four Hands) and Orchestra (2008); Pirola, Carlo: Story of Pierrot (n.d.; brass band); Stuppner, Hubert: Pierrot and Pierrette (1984; ballet, libretto by Arthur Schnitzler [see The Veil of Pierrette under Plays, playlets, pantomimes, and revues]); Vidale, Piero: Pierrot's Dream: Four Fantasy Impressions (1957; orchestra).
- Russian—Koshkin, Nikita: "Pierrot and Harlequin", from Masquerades, II (1988; guitar); Voronov, Grigori: Pierrot and Harlequin (n.d. [recorded 2006]; saxophone and piano).
- Swiss—Gaudibert, Éric: Pierrot, to the table! or The Poet's Supper (2003; percussion, accordion, saxophone, horn, piano).
- Uruguayan—Pasquet, Luis (emigrated to Finland 1974): Triangle of Love (n.d.; #1: "Pierrot"; piano and brass band).

Opera

- American (U.S.A.)—Baksa, Robert: Aria da Capo (1968); Bilotta, John George: Aria da Capo (1980); Blank, Allan: Aria da Capo (1958–60); Smith, Larry Alan: Aria da Capo (1980)—all libretti by Edna St. Vincent Millay (see above under Plays, playlets, pantomimes, and revues).
- French— Margoni, Alain: Pierrot, or The Secrets of the Night (1990; libretto by Rémi Laureillard adapted from Michel Tournier; see above under Fiction).
- Slovenian—Svete, Tomaž: Pierrot and Pierrette (2006; libretto by Slavko Grum; see Plays, playlets, pantomimes, and revues: Slovenian, above).
- See also Pierrot lunaire below.

==== Rock/pop ====
===== Group names and costumes =====
- American—Bob Dylan performed often in whiteface in his Rolling Thunder Revue (1975), partly in homage to the Barrault/Deburau Pierrot of Children of Paradise; the face of Frank Sinatra is made up as Pierrot's (disfigured by a cherry nose à la Emmett Kelly) on the cover of his album Frank Sinatra Sings for Only the Lonely (1958); Lady Gaga appears as Pierrot on the cover of her single "Applause" from her album Artpop (2013); Michael Jackson appears as Pierrot on the cover of the Michael Jackson Mega Box (2009), a DVD collection of interviews with the singer; "Puddles, the Sad Clown with the Golden Voice", a persona of "Big" Mike Geier, pays tribute to Pierrot on his concert tours and YouTube videos, most notably with Scott Bradlee's Postmodern Jukebox.
- British—David Bowie dressed as Pierrot for the single and video of "Ashes to Ashes" (1980) and for the cover of his album Scary Monsters (and Super Creeps) (1980; referring to his ever-changing performing personae, Bowie told an interviewer in 1976, "I'm Pierrot. I'm Everyman. What I'm doing is theatre ... the white face, the baggy pants – they're Pierrot, the eternal clown putting over the great sadness ..."); Leo Sayer dressed as Pierrot on tour following the release of his first album, Silverbird (1973); Robots in Disguise: The Tears (2008), a video by Graeme Pearce, features black-suited Pierrots involved in love triangle.
- Finnish—Poets of the Fall front-man Marko Saaresto uses stage and video personae based on Pierrot, notably in the videos for singles "Carnival of Rust" (2006), "Can You Hear Me" (2011), "Cradled in Love" (2012) and "Drama for Life" (2016). His personae go by different names, including "Zoltar", "The Poet of the Fall" and "Jeremiah Peacekeeper".
- Hungarian—Pierrot's Dream was a rock band performing from 1986 to 1996; its singer-founder Tamás Z. Marosi often appeared in a clown half-mask.
- Italian—Pierrot Lunaire was a progressive rock/folk band.
- Japanese—Közi often wore a Pierrot costume while a member of the visual rock band Malice Mizer (1992–2001); Pierrot was a rock band active from 1994 to 2006.
- Russian—Cabaret Pierrot le Fou is a cabaret-noir group formed by Sergey Vasilyev in 2009; The Moon Pierrot was a conceptual rock band active from 1985 to 1992; it released its English-language studio album The Moon Pierrot L.P. in 1991 (a second album, Whispers & Shadows, recorded in 1992, was not released until 2013).
- Scottish—Zal Cleminson, lead guitarist of The Sensational Alex Harvey Band, appeared in whiteface throughout his years with the group.

===== Songs, albums, and rock musicals =====
- American (U.S.A.)—Arcangelo il Demoni (born Nickolas Simone): "Pierrot" (2021; in collaboration with shoegaze band Cupid Come); Joe Dassin (worked mainly in France): "Pauvre Pierrot" ("Poor Pierrot"), from Elle était oh!... (1971); Thomas Nöla et son Orchestre: "Les Pierrots", in Soundtrack to the Doctor (2006).
- Australian—Katie Noonan and Elixir: "Pierrot", from First Seed Ripening (2011); The Seekers: "The Carnival Is Over" (1965: "But the joys of love are fleeting/For Pierrot and Columbine").
- Belgian—Sly-Dee: Histoire de Pierrot (Pierrot's Story [1994]).
- Brazilian—Los Hermanos: "Pierrot", from Los Hermanos (1999); Luiz Bonfá and Maria Toledo: "Pierrot", from Braziliana (1965); Marina Lima: Pierrot de Brasil (1998).
- British—Ali Campbell: "Nothing Ever Changes (Pierrot)", from Flying High (2009); David Bowie: Pierrot in Turquoise (1993; includes following songs from the film of the same title: "Threepenny Pierrot", "Columbine", "The Mirror", "When I Live My Dream [1 & 2]"); Michael Moorcock and the Deep Fix: "Birthplace of Harlequin", "Columbine Confused", "Pierrot's Song of Positive Thinking", and "Pierrot in the Roof Garden", from The Entropy Tango and Gloriana Demo Sessions (2008); Momus: "Pierrot Lunaire", from Oskar Tennis Champion (2003); Petula Clark: "Pierrot pendu" ("Hanged Pierrot"), from Hello Mister Brown (1966); Placebo: "Pierrot the Clown", from Meds (2006); Rick Wakeman: "The Dancing Pierrot", from The Art in Music Trilogy (1999); Soft Machine: "Thank You Pierrot Lunaire", from Volume Two (1969); Steve Hackett: "Pierrot", from Momentum (1988).
- Czech—Václav Patejdl: Grand Pierrot (1995; rock musical).
- Dutch—Bonnie St. Claire: "Pierrot" (1980); Thijs Van Leer: "Pierrot" (1987).
- French—Alain Kan: "Au pays de Pierrot" ("In Pierrot Country" [1973]); Chantal Goya: "Les pierrots de Paris" and "Pierrot tout blanc" ("Pure White Pierrot"), in Monsieur le Chat Botté (1982); Danielle Licari: "Les Chansons de Pierrot" (1981); Guy Béart: "Pierrot la tendresse" ("Pierrot the Tender"), from Béart à l'université de Louvain (1974); Gérard Lenorman: "Pierrot chanteur", from Le Soleil des Tropiques (1983); Jacques Dutronc: "Où est-il l'ami Pierrot?" ("Where's Friend Pierrot?"), from L'intégrale les Cactus (2004); Loïc Lantoine: "Pierrot", from Tout est calme (2006); Maxime Le Forestier: "Le Fantôme de Pierrot" ("Pierrot's Ghost"), from Hymne à sept temps (1976); Michèle Torr: "Dis Pierrot" ("Say Pierrot"), from film Une fille nommée amour (1969); Mireille Mathieu: "Mon copain Pierrot" ("My Pal Pierrot" [1967]); Pascal Danel: "Pierrot le sait" ("Pierrot Knows" [1966]); Pierre Perret: Le Monde de Pierrot (The World of Pierrot [2005]; double album); Renaud: "Chanson pour Pierrot", from Ma Gonzesse (1979); Saez: "Les enfants lune", from Acte 1 Manifeste : L'Oiseau Liberté (2016).
- Italian—Bandabardò: "La fine di Pierrot" ("The End of Pierrot"), from Tre passi avanti (2004); Gianni Togni: "Luna" ("Se sono triste, mi travesto come Pierrot" ["If I'm sad, I'll dress up like Pierrot"]), from ...E in quel momento (1980); Gigi Finizio: "Pierrot", from A te donna (1984); Litfiba: "Pierrot e la luna" ("Pierrot and the Moon"), from 17 RE (1987); Matia Bazar: "Mio bel Pierrot" ("My Lovely Pierrot"), from Il tempo del sole (1980); Novembre: "Come Pierrot" ("Like Pierrot"), from Novembrine Waltz (2001); Patty Pravo: "Come un Pierrot" ("Like a Pierrot" [1974]); Pierrot Lunaire: Pierrot Lunaire (1974).
- Japanese—9mm Parabellum Bullet: "Mad Pierrot" (2016); Alcoholic Kidz: "Pierrot" (2009); Aya Kamiki: "Pierrot" (2006); Berryz Kobo: "Kokuhaku no Funsui Hiroba" ("Fountain Plaza of My Confession" [2007]; contains lyric watashi piero ["I am Pierrot"]); Hatsune Miku: ピエロ (Pierrot) (2010; Vocaloid; KEI [ハヤシケイ]), からくりピエロ (Karakuri Piero) (2011; Vocaloid; text by 40meterP); Mothy a.k.a. Akuno-P: "The Fifth: Pierrot" (2011); Pierrot: Mad Pierrot (1994); Tanaka Koki of pop group KAT-TUN: "Pierrot", from Break the Records: By You & For You (2009); Toshihiko Tahara: "Pierrot" (1983); Yellow Magic Orchestra: "Mad Pierrot", from Yellow Magic Orchestra (1978); DADAROMA: “Risley Circus” (2016, contains lyric “This is a story of one pierrot.”); ZUN: "星条旗のピエロ" ("Pierrot of the Star-Spangled Banner"), from Legacy of Lunatic Kingdom (2015).
- Monegasque—Jacques Pills: "Mon ami Pierrot"—Eurovision Song Contest 1959 entry.
- Puerto Rican—Tony Fargo: "Pierrot" (1969; recorded by Tito Rodríguez).
- South Korean—Elizabeth: "Ppappa Pierrot" (2011); Kim Wan-sun: 삐에로는 우릴 보고 웃지 "Pierrot Laughs at Us" (1990); JYJ: "Pierrot", from Their Rooms "Our Story" (2011); Lee Hyun Do: "Pierrot" (1999; featured in music video game Pump It Up); Maximum Crew: Pierrot (2009); Outsider: "Pierrot's Tear", from Vol. 2 Maestro (2009), "Pierrot's Tear II", from Vol. 2.5 The Outsider (2010), "Pierrot's Tear III", from Vol. 3 Hero (2010); Rainbow: "Pierrot", from INNOCENT (2015). LE SSERAFIM: "Pierrot", from CRAZY (2024).
- Uruguayan—Falta y Resto: "Brindis por Pierrot" ("Cheers for Pierrot"), from Amor Rioplatense (2007); Jaime Roos: Brindis por Pierrot (1985).
