= Brunet (surname) =

Brunet is a surname. Notable people with the surname include:

- Alain Brunet, French scholar
- Andrée Brunet, figure skater
- Benoît Brunet (born 1968), Canadian former ice hockey player
- Catherine Brunet (born 1990), Canadian actress
- Claude Brunet (1942–1988), campaigner for patient rights
- Corinne Amori Brunet, Franco-Beninese diplomat and politician
- Éric Brunet (born 1964), French political commentator and radio host
- Eugène Cyrille Brunet (1828–1921), French sculptor
- Frantz Brunet (1879–1965), French linguist
- Frederic Brunet (born 2003), Canadian ice hockey player
- Gaspard Jean-Baptiste Brunet (1734–1793), French general
- Geneviève Brunet (1930–2025), French actress
- Geneviève Robic-Brunet (born 1959), Canadian cyclist
- George Brunet (1935–1991), American baseball player
- Jacques Charles Brunet (1780–1867), French bibliographer
- Jean Baptiste Brunet (1763–1824), French general, son of Gaspard
- Jean Brunet (1822–1894), French poet
- Jean-Pierre Brunet, figure skater
- José Manuel Brunet, Argentine fencer
- Joseph-Émile Brunet (1878–1953), Canadian sculptor
- Juan Ignacio Brunet, Argentine footballer
- Jules Brunet (1838–1911), captain
- Luíza Brunet, Brazilian model
- Manuel Brunet, Argentine field hockey player
- Marion Brunet (born 1976), French writer, winner of the Astrid Lindgren Memorial Award 2025
- Marta Brunet, Chilean writer
- Michel Brunet (disambiguation)
- Pierre Nicolas Brunet (1733–1771), French playwright
- Pierre Brunet (disambiguation)
- Roberta Brunet, Italian athlete
- Sylvie Brunet, French mezzo-soprano
- Yasmin Brunet, Brazilian model

== See also ==
- Brunette (disambiguation)#People
- Burnet (disambiguation)#People named Burnet
