= List of number-one hits of 1980 (Italy) =

This is a list of number-one songs in 1980 on the Italian charts compiled weekly by the Italian Hit Parade Singles Chart.

== Chart history ==
Issue date	Song	Artist(s)	Ref.
January 5	"Disco Bambina"	Heather Parisi	
January 12	"Remi, Le Sue Avventure"	I Ragazzi Di Remi	
January 19	"Remi, Le Sue Avventure"	I Ragazzi Di Remi	
January 26	"Disco Bambina"	Heather Parisi	
February 2	"Disco Bambina"	Heather Parisi	
February 9	"Remi, Le Sue Avventure"	I Ragazzi Di Remi	
February 16	"Disco Bambina"	Heather Parisi	
February 23	"Disco Bambina"	Heather Parisi	
March 1	"My Sharona"	The Knack	
March 8	"My Sharona"	The Knack	
March 15	"Video Killed the Radio Star"	The Buggles	
March 22	"Video Killed the Radio Star"	The Buggles	
March 29	"Video Killed the Radio Star"	The Buggles	
April 5	"Video Killed the Radio Star"	The Buggles	
April 12	"Video Killed the Radio Star"	The Buggles	
April 19	"Video Killed the Radio Star"	The Buggles	
April 26	"Video Killed the Radio Star"	The Buggles	
May 3	"Video Killed the Radio Star"	The Buggles	
May 10	"Video Killed the Radio Star"	The Buggles	
May 17	"Video Killed the Radio Star"	The Buggles	
May 24	"Video Killed the Radio Star"	The Buggles	
May 31	"Video Killed the Radio Star"	The Buggles	
June 7	"Video Killed the Radio Star"	The Buggles	
June 14	"Video Killed the Radio Star"	The Buggles	
June 21	"L'ape Maia"	Katia Svizzero	
June 28	"Non so che darei"	Alan Sorrenti	
July 5	"Non so che darei"	Alan Sorrenti	
July 12	"Non so che darei"	Alan Sorrenti	
July 19	"Non so che darei"	Alan Sorrenti	
July 26	"Non so che darei"	Alan Sorrenti	
August 2	"Non so che darei"	Alan Sorrenti	
August 9	"Luna"	Gianni Togni	
August 16	"Luna"	Gianni Togni	
August 23	"Luna"	Gianni Togni	
August 30	"Luna"	Gianni Togni	
September 6	"Luna"	Gianni Togni	
September 13	"Luna"	Gianni Togni	
September 20	"Olympic Games"	Miguel Bosé	
September 27	"Olympic Games"	Miguel Bosé	
October 4	"Amico"	Renato Zero	
October 11	"Amico"	Renato Zero	
October 18	"Amico"	Renato Zero	
October 25	"Amico"	Renato Zero	
November 1	"Amico"	Renato Zero	
November 8	"Upside Down"	Diana Ross	
November 15	"Upside Down"	Diana Ross	
November 22	"Upside Down"	Diana Ross	
November 29	"You and Me"	Spargo	
December 6	"You and Me"	Spargo	
December 13	"You and Me"	Spargo	
December 20	"You and Me"	Spargo	
December 27	"You and Me"	Spargo	

== Number-one artists ==
Position	Artist	Weeks #1
1	The Buggles	14
2	Alan Sorrenti	6
2	Gianni Togni	6
3	Heather Parisi	5
3	Renato Zero	5
3	Spargo	5
4	Diana Ross	3
4	I Ragazzi Di Remi	3
5	The Knack	2
5	Miguel Bosé	2
6	Katia Svizzero	1
