= Brunet =

Brunet (male) or brunette (female) refers to a person with brown hair.

Brunet may also refer to:

- Brunet (surname)
- Brunet (pharmacy), a chain located in Quebec, Canada
- Brunet, Alpes-de-Haute-Provence, a commune of the Alpes-de-Haute-Provence département, France
- Brunet Castle, historic castle in Chile
