= Closer to God =

- Film poster
- Directed by: Billy Senese
- Written by: Billy Senese
- Produced by: Jeremy Childs; Jonathan Rogers; Jennifer Spriggs
- Starring: Jeremy Childs
- Cinematography: Evan Spencer Brace
- Edited by: Jonathan Rogers
- Music by: Thomas Nöla
- Production company: LC Pictures
- Distributed by: Uncork'd Entertainment
- Release date: July 25, 2014 (Fantasia)
- Running time: 81 minutes
- Country: United States
- Language: English

Closer to God is a 2014 American science fiction horror film produced by and starring Jeremy Childs.

== Plot ==
Dr. Victor Reed (Jeremy Childs) is a humorlessly committed biological scientist with a privately funded genetic experimental laboratory secreted away on a locked floor in a hospital. We first encounter him as he's delivering Elizabeth, a seemingly normal infant who's nonetheless very special as the first of her kind. Reluctantly if cryptically announcing this breakthrough to the public (he refuses to name anyone involved in the baby's conception or birth besides himself, or to let her be seen as yet), he braves an immediate firestorm of pushy press inquiries, as well as outrage from those who believe such scientific explorations represent a grave offense against God and nature. Others note the great medical advances that cloning might help instigate, but they're generally shouted down by the pious and appalled.

The outcry is such that government authorities are pressured to drum up criminal charges against Victor. Worried about security, he transfers the baby from the lab to his own home, a gated country estate where wife Claire (Shannon Hoppe) is already fed up with his workaholic neglect of their own “normal” family, including two preschool daughters. While she can't help but take a maternal interest in Elizabeth, the tense atmosphere worsens as protestors and media discover the baby's new location — as leaked by lab assistant Laura (Emily Landham), who has serious ethical and safety worries over the doctor's treatment of his experimental progeny.

Perhaps even more perilous than the rising clamor outside, however, is a ticking time bomb within: A couple (Shelean Newman, David Alford) who work for the household are also charged with minding a murkily explained older child who is evidently the product of a less successful, earlier cloning attempt. Kept in barred quarters away from the main building (and little seen until the end), the increasingly violent, misshapen Ethan (Isaac Disney) inevitably busts out to go on a rampage, terrorizing all in the climactic reel.

== Cast ==
- Jeremy Childs as Victor
- Shelean Newman as Mary
- Shannon Hoppe as Claire
- David Alford as Richard
- Isaac Disney as Ethan
- Olivia Lyle as Elizabeth
- Jake Speck as James
- Emily Landham as Laura
- Josh Graham as Man
- John Schuck as Sydney
- Joshua Childs as David
- Piper Hoppe as Rachael
- Anna Garges as Rebecca

== Production ==
In addition to acting in and producing the film, Childs also served as the casting director.

== Reception ==
The film has a 56% approval rating on Rotten Tomatoes based on 18 reviews, with an average rating of 5.9/10. Wes Greene of Slant Magazine gave the film two stars out of four. Dann Gire of the Daily Herald awarded the film two stars. John Anderson of IndieWire graded the film a B.
