= Pierre Brunet =

Pierre Brunet may refer to:

- Pierre Brunet (figure skater) (1902–1991), French figure skater
- Pierre Brunet (musician), French 17th century mandola player and teacher
- Pierre Brunet (rowing) (1908–1979), French rowing coxswain
- Pierre Gustave Brunet (1805–1896), French bibliographer
- Pierre Nicolas Brunet (1733–1771), French writer and playwright
