= Antoine Jean Sticotti =

French comedian and playwright (1715-1772)

Antoine Jean Sticotti, called Toni or Fabio, (1715–1772) was an 18th-century French comedian and playwright born in the Friuli area then in the Republic of Venice. He was the son of Fabio Sticotti and Ursule Astori.

Sticotti arrived in Paris with his parents in 1716, made his debut aged 14 at the Théâtre-Italien in 1729 in the parts of Lélio then Pantalone, and retired in 1759 to move to the service of Frederick the Great in Prussia.

On 13 August 1739, Sticotti married Marie Claude Duflos; three months before, Ursule, his mother, died.

== Plays ==
- Cybelle amoureuse
- Roland, parody by Panard and Sticotti premiered by the Comédiens italiens ordinaires du Roy, 20 January 1744, Paris, Prault, 1744
- L'Impromptu des acteurs
- Les Ennuis de Thalie (with Pannard)
- Les François du Port-Mahon (with Lachassaigne)
- Les Faux Devins (with Brunet)
- Le Carnaval d'été (parody, with de Morambert)
- Amadis (parody, with de Morambert)
- Garrick ou les Auteurs anglais
- Complimens pour la closture et pour l'ouverture [de la Comédie Italienne le 6 avril 1737], Paris, Veuve Delormel, 1737
- Dictionnaire des gens du monde, historique, littéraire, critique, moral, physique (...), 1770.
- Dictionnaire des passions, des vertus et des vices, ou Recueil des meilleurs morceaux de morale pratique, tirés des auteurs anciens et modernes, étrangers et nationaux, Paris, Laporte, 1777
- Les Festes sincères, comédie en un acte et en vers au sujet de la convalescence du Roy, représentées par les Comédiens italiens ordinaires du Roi, le 5 octobre 1744, 1745 (with Panard)
- Les Soupirs d'Euridice aux Champs Élisées, 1770 (read online)
