= Harry Smart =

British poet (born 1956)

Harry Smart (born 1956) is a British poet.

He was born in Yorkshire and lives in Montrose, Scotland. He has had three poetry collections published by Faber and Faber:

- Shoah (ISBN 0571167934, May 1993)
- Pierrot (ISBN 0-571-16279-7)
- Fool's Pardon (ISBN 0571173594, July 1995)

He has also written a novel, called Zaire (ISBN 1-873982-92-5).
