= Indrek Hirv =

Estonian writer

Indrek Hirv (born 15 December 1956 in Kohila) is an Estonian poet, translator and artist.

In 1981 he graduated from State Art Institute of the Estonian SSR, studied ceramics.

In 1988 he established Konrad Mägi Studio of the Tartu Art Association; being also the first director of this studio.

Since 1985, he is a member of Estonian Artists' Union and since 1991 Estonian Writers' Union.

== Works ==
- 1980: poetry collection "Uneraev" ('Sleep-rage')
- 2012: poetry collection "Tiivavalu"
- 2016: poetry collection "Toomemägi on Emajõgi"
