= Fabio Sticotti =

Parisian comic actor (1676-1741)

Fabio Sticotti (Friuli, Northern Italy 1676 – Paris, 5 December 1741) was an 18th-century Parisian comic actor. The husband of opera singer Ursula Astori, he arrived in Paris in 1716 and began acting only in 1733, in the role of Pantalone. He was a member of the Comédie-Italienne

The couple had three children: Antoine Jean (1715-1772), Michaelo and Agathe.
