= Percival Pollard =

American novelist

Percival Pollard

Joseph Percival Pollard (January 29, 1869 – December 17, 1911) was an American literary critic, novelist and short story writer.

== Biography ==
Born in Greifswald, Pomerania to English and German parents, he was educated at Eastbourne College in Sussex, England. His family emigrated to the United States in 1885.

After a youthful period in Iowa, he spent much of his life moving back and forth between London, Paris and New York. His best-known work was Their Day in Court, a 1909 book of literary and cultural commentary. His works reflect his dislike for naturalism, and disdain for the commercial tastes of the masses, promoting instead aestheticism and literary impressionism. A good friend of both Ambrose Bierce and H. L. Mencken, Mencken wrote of him warmly in the first series of his work Prejudices, comparing Pollard favorably to contemporary and fellow American aesthete James Huneker. Pollard was also noted as an early advocate of James Branch Cabell and the initial works of Robert W. Chambers.

Other works include Dreams of To-day (1907), a book of decadent 'weird tales' in the vein of Chambers' The King in Yellow, the critical study Masks and Minstrels of New Germany (1911), the novels The Imitator (1901) and Lingo Dan (1903), as well as a play written in collaboration with Leo Ditrichstein, The Ambitious Mrs. Alcott, which opened and closed after 24 performances on Broadway in 1907. Pollard, aged 42, died unexpectedly from "brain neuritis" in 1911 in Baltimore, cutting short a promising career. Mencken and Bierce attended his funeral. His cremated remains were sent back to Iowa. A 1947 Ph.D. dissertation, Percival Pollard: Precursor of the Twenties, by George Nicholas Kummer of New York University, has remained in unpublished typescript form.

== Bibliography ==
- The Cape of Storms (1892)
- Miniature Dreams (1893)
- Posters in Miniature (1896)
- The Kiss That Killed (1898)
- The Imitator (1901)
- Lingo Dan (1903)
- In Memoriam: Oscar Wilde (1905, as translator)
- Dreams of To-day (1907)
- The Ambitious Mrs. Alcott (1907, with Leo Ditrichstein)
- Their Day in Court (1909)
- Masks and Minstrels of New Germany (1911)
- Vagabond Journeys: the Human Comedy at Home and Abroad (1911)
