= Michel Brunet =

Michel Brunet may refer to:

- Michel Brunet (historian) (1917–1985), Canadian historian
- Michel Brunet (paleontologist) (born 1940), French paleontologist
- Michel Brunet (figure skater) (born 1970), Canadian skater
