= Wilbur Underwood =

American poet

Wilbur Underwood (1874–1935) was an American poet of the late 19th and early twentieth century. His work, especially the 1906 volume, A Book of Masks, had deep affiliations with the decadent movement in literature. Today he is best known as a friend and confidant of Hart Crane, whom he befriended in Washington, D.C. in 1920. Crane's intimate letters to Underwood, often censored, have been occasionally anthologized. His poem, The Cattle of His Hand, was anthologized in Edmund Clarence Stedman's 1900 verse collection, An American Anthology. Underwood, until 1933, worked in a clerical-administrative position in the State Department. His selected poems were published in 1949.

== Bibliography ==
- A Book of Masks (1907)
- Damien of Molokai (1909)
- The Way: Poems (1927)
- To One in Heaven (1928)
- Fountain of Dark Waters (1933)
- Selected Poems (1949)
