= Felipe Sassone =

Peruvian writer

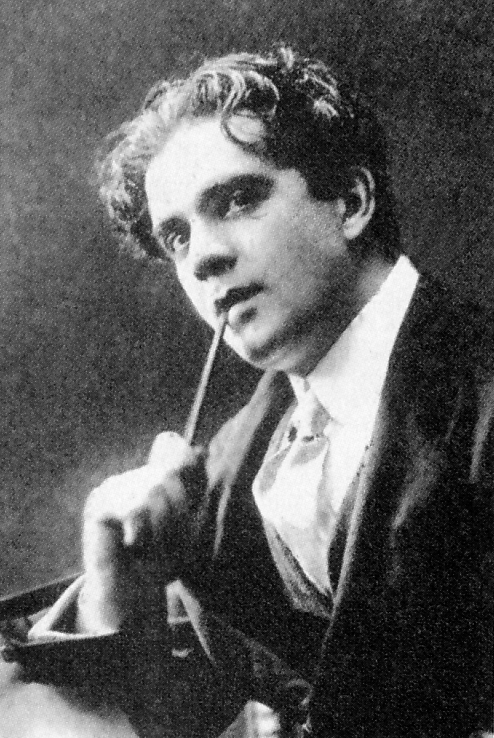
Felipe Sassone

Felipe Sassone (1884–1959) was a Peruvian writer of Italian origin, who lived most of his life in Spain. One reviewer wrote that he was "seduced by Fascism".

== See also ==
- The Rhetoric of Reaction
