= Brunette (disambiguation) =

A brunette is a person with brown hair.

Brunette may also refer to:

== Music ==
- The Brunettes, a New Zealand indie pop group
- "Brunette" (song), by Tucker Wetmore
- Brunette (song form), an 18th-century French popular song form

== People ==
- Andrew Brunette (born 1973), Canadian ice hockey player
- Justin Brunette (born 1975), American baseball player
- Tommy Brunette, a member of punk rock band Towers of London
- Brunette, Armenian singer and songwriter (born 2001)

== Places ==
- Brunette Downs, a cattle station in the Northern Territory, Australia
- Brunette, Newfoundland and Labrador, a settlement in Canada
- Brunette Island, an island in Canada
- Brunette River, a river in British Columbia in Canada
