= Richard von Schaukal =

Moravia-born Austrian poet

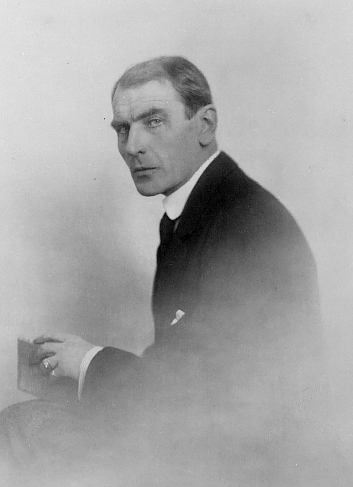
Richard von Schaukal, 1924

Richard (von) Schaukal (27 May 1874 in Brno – 10 October 1942 in Vienna) was a Moravia-born Austrian poet.

== Bibliography ==
- Gedichte, 1893 (poetry)
- Meine Gärten, 1897 (poetry)
- Tristia, 1898 (poetry)
- Tage und Träume, 1899 (poetry)
- Sehnsucht, 1900 (poetry)
- Intérieurs aus dem Leben der Zwanzigjährigen, 1901
- Von Tod zu Tod und andere kleine Geschichten, 1902
- Pierrot und Colombine oder das Lied von der Ehe, 1902
- Mimi Lynx, 1904 (novella)
- Eros Thanatos, 1906 (short stories)
- Leben und Meinungen des Herrn Andreas von Balthesser eines Dandy und Dilettanten, 1907
- Giorgione oder Gespräche über die Kunst, 1907
- Buch der Seele, 1908 (poetry)
- Vom Geschmack: Zeitgemässe Laienpredigte über das Thema Kultur, 1910
- Vom unsichtbaren Königreich, 1910
- Die Märchen von Hans Bürgers Kindheit, 1913
- Kindergedichte, 1913
- Eherne Sonette. 1914, 1914
- Herbst, 1914 (poetry)
- Das Buch Immergrün, 1915
- Heimat der Seele, 1916 (poetry)
- Dionys-bácsi, 1922 (short stories)
- Jahresringe, 1922 (poetry)
- Herbsthöhe, 1933 (poetry)
