= Claude Brunet =

Claude Brunet, CM (1942–1988) was a paraplegic man who campaigned for patients rights in Quebec. He founded the Quebec Provincial Committee of Patients in 1972. He also started with Council for the Protection of Patients—CPM (Conseil pour la protection des malades). In 2015 this council celebrated its 40th year.

In 1979, he sued hospital staff at Saint-Charles-Borromée, Quebec in a class action suit on behalf of fellow patients after a series of illegal work stoppages left fellow patients at the hospital uncared for long periods of time (once for four days). He won his case in January 1981.

== Family ==
He married Jeannine Ruscina on June 23, 1973.

He has four brothers.

== Bibliography ==
- Nous, les oubliés (1973)

== Awards ==
He was made a recipient of the Order of Canada in 1983.

He received the Thérèse Casgrain Volunteer Award in 1985.

== Sources ==
- Waller, Adrian Disabled, He Fights for the Chronically Ill - Reader's Digest December 1981 pp. 128–132.
