= Thomas Nöla =

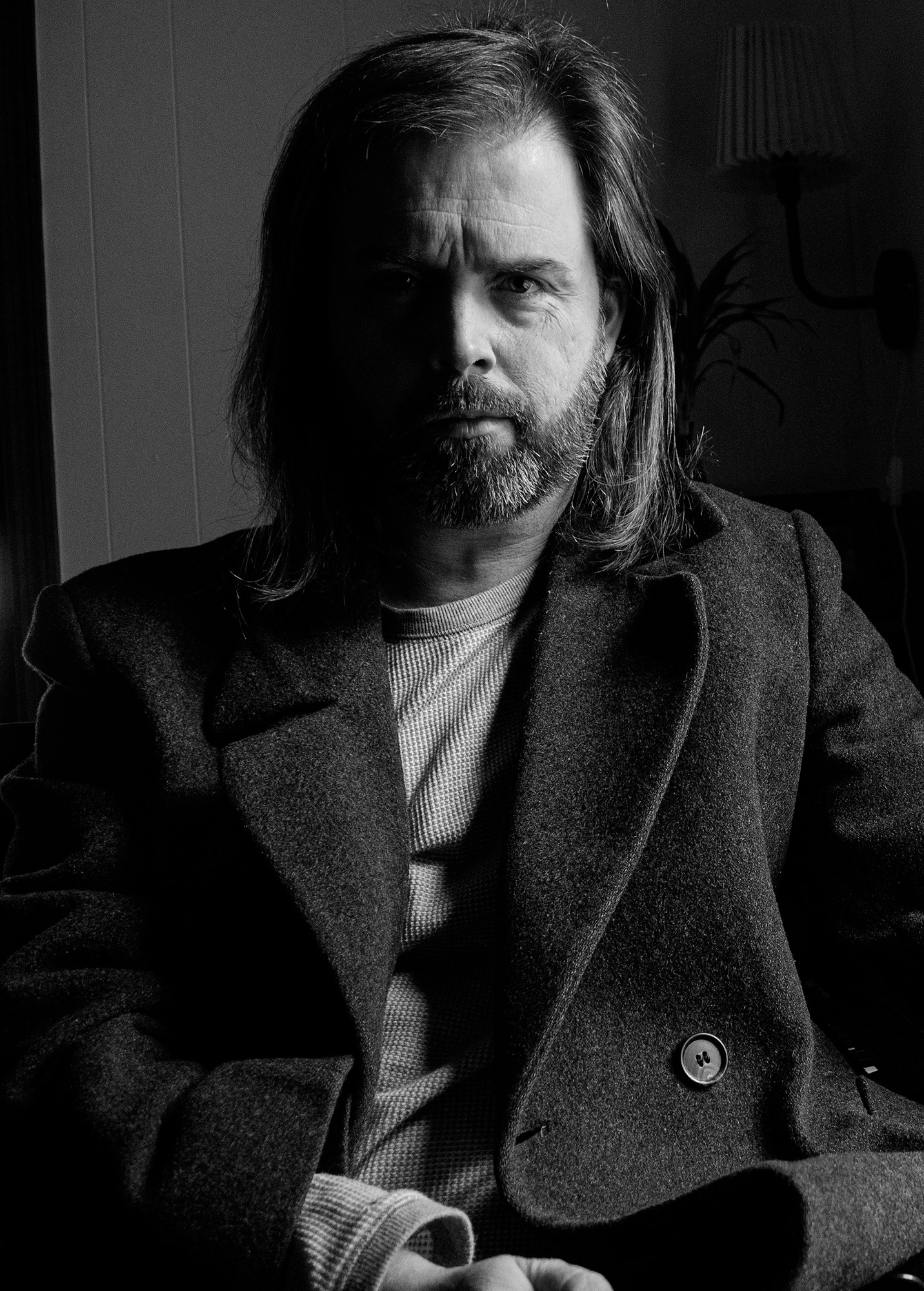
- Nöla in 2021

Background information
- Origin: United States
- Genres: Cabaret; Folk; Neo-ragtime; Lounge; Jazz; Post-industrial
- Years active: 2005–present
- Label: County Lapin
- Website: www.thomasnola.ie

Thomas Nöla (born December 31, 1979) is an Irish and American artist from Boston, Massachusetts, responsible for several low-budget films and experimental pop albums. He lives in rural Vermont.

His musical acts have toured the US and Europe and released recordings on the Portland-based Soleilmoon/Caciocavallo label, Punch Records in Italy and on his own Disques de Lapin.

== Film and television ==
Year	Title	Role(s)
2003	Jack	Director, actor, composer
2005	The Doctor	Director, actor, composer
2007	To The Wolves...	Director, actor, composer
2007	Behind the Eight	Actor
2010	Happy Birthday, Cake Eater	Director, actor
2011	Blood Jungle ...or Eviva il Coltello!	Director, actor, composer
2011	The Suicide Tapes	Composer
2011	Intruder	Composer
2012	Lemmingvision 2000	Actor, director
2014	Closer To God	Composer

== Albums ==
Year	Title	Format, special notes
2003	Jack	CD - Eskimo Films (simply as 'Thomas Nöla')
2006	The Doctor	2XLP, CD - Caciocavallo/Soleilmoon
2006	So Long, Lale Andersen	CD - Disques de Lapin
2007	To The Wolves...	CD - Disques de Lapin
2007	¡Vanity Is a Sin!	CD - Punch Records (Italy)
2008	The Rose-Tinted Monocle	LP + CD, LP + MP3 - Disques de Lapin
2009	Les Paradisiers - More Tales from the Garden	LP - Disques de Lapin
2010	Très Pathétique	CD - Disques de Lapin
2010	Rainy Day Rainbow People	CD, cassette - Disques de Lapin
2010	Les Paradisiers - Bazaar Creatures	CD - Disques de Lapin
2012	Monoliths	CD, cassette - Disques de Lapin
2013	Future Illusions	CD, cassette - Disques de Lapin
2013	Les Paradisiers - When We Had The Moon	CD, cassette - Disques de Lapin
2015	Animal Soul	LP - Disques de Lapin
2015	Animal Clouds	cassette - Disques de Lapin
2017	After Horse	CD - Disques de Lapin
2018	Mind over Shadow	2xCD - Disques de Lapin
2019	Pacific Palisades	CD - Disques de Lapin; cassette - Dandy Tapes
2020	Les Paradisiers - Indian Summer	CD - Wrotycz Records
2020	Night Of The Umbrella	CD - Disques de Lapin; cassette - Dandy Tapes
2020	Maple Moon	CD - Disques de Lapin; cassette - Dandy Tapes
2022	How's Your Rainbow?	CD - Grabaciones Sentimentales / thomasnola.com
2025	Palace Green & VI Towerspells For Enlightened Dwarves	CD - County Lapin

== Radio ==
Year	Title	Role(s)
2006	Insomnia (play) dir. Billy Senese	Composer
2006	The Long Weekend (play) dir. Billy Senese	Composer
2007	Disposable Life (play) dir. Billy Senese	Composer
2007	The Suicide Tapes (play) dir. Billy Senese	Composer
