= Pierrot (poem) =

Poem

"Pierrot" is a short poem written by the African-American author Langston Hughes. It was first published in the anthology The Weary Blues in 1926. In 30 lines, it describes contrasts the characters of Simple John, who adheres to an ethic of hard work and traditional virtues, and Pierrot, who leads a Dionysian and carefree life. In the end, Pierrot runs away with John's wife.
