= Luna (Gianni Togni song) =

Single by Gianni Togni

from the album ...e in quel momento
- B-side: "Chissà se mi ritroverai"
- Released: 1980
- Genre: Pop
- Length: 4:09
- Label: CGD
- Songwriter(s): Gianni Togni; Guido Morra
- Producer(s): Giancarlo Lucariello

Gianni Togni singles chronology
"Ma tu nn ci sei più" (1977)	"Luna" (1980)	"Semplice" (1981)

Audio
- "Luna" on YouTube

"Luna" (lit. 'Moon') is a 1980 song composed and performed by Gianni Togni. Togni's signature song, it topped the Italian hit parade.

== Background ==
The song marked Togni's breakout after his unsuccessful 1975 debut album In una simile circostanza. Originally it consisted of two different songs, "Anna" and "Guardo il mondo", which were merged into a single song upon suggestion of arranger Maurizio Fabrizio. The title of 2007 film by Stefano Calvagna, E guardo il mondo da un oblò ("And I look at the world through a porthole"), is a literal citation of the first verse of the song.

== Other versions ==
In 2019, Jovanotti released a cover version of the song, produced and arranged by Rick Rubin, as the lead single of the album Lorenzo sulla Luna. The song was also covered by Francesca Alotta in her moon-themed 1997 album Buonanotte alla luna.

== Track listing ==
No.	Title	Length
1.	"Luna"	4:09
2.	"Chissà se mi ritroverai"	4:00

== Charts ==
Chart (1980–81)	Peak position
Italy (Musica e dischi)	1
Switzerland (Schweizer Hitparade)	4

== Certifications ==
Region	Certification	Certified units/sales
Italy (FIMI) certification for digital sales and streaming since January 2009	Platinum	100,000^{‡}
^{‡} Sales+streaming figures based on certification alone.
