= Pierre Nicolas Brunet =

French writer and playwright (1733–1771)

Pierre Nicolas Brunet (1733, in Paris – 4 November 1771) was an 18th-century French writer and playwright.

== Works ==
- 1756: Minorque conquise, poème héroïque en 4 chants
- 1758: Les Noms changés, ou l'Indifférent corrigé, comedy in five acts and in verse, played seven times in a row at Théâtre-Français
- 1739: Les Faux Devins, in five acts and in verse, with Antoine Jean Sticotti
- 1758: Les Festes d'Euterpe
- 1760: La rentrée des théâtres, ou L'invention, in one act and in verse.
- 1762: La Fausse Turqile, in collaboration at Théâtre de la foire.
- 1769: Hippomène et Atalante, ballet héroïque in one act.
- 1769: Thèagène et Charidée

== Sources ==
Louis Gabriel Michaud. "name". Biographie universelle ancienne et moderne : histoire par ordre alphabétique de la vie publique et privée de tous les hommes avec la collaboration de plus de 300 savants et littérateurs français ou étrangers (in French) (2 ed.).
