= Gianni Togni =

Italian singer and composer (born 1956)

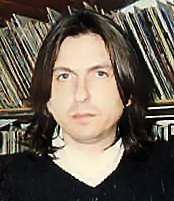
- Togni in March 2008

Background information
- Born: Gianni Togni; 24 July 1956 (age 69); Rome, Italy
- Origin: Lazio, Italy
- Genres: Pop
- Occupation: Singer
- Years active: 1975–present
- Website: giannitogni.it

Gianni Togni (born 24 July 1956 in Rome) is an Italian singer.

He started his musical career with the album In una simile circostanza (1975), he obtained notable success in 1980 with the single "Luna", from the album ... E in quel momento, which ranked first in the Italian hit parade. Other top-ten singles included the songs "Semplice" and "Vivi".

== Discography ==
- In una simile circostanza (1975)
- ...E in quel momento, entrando in un teatro vuoto, un pomeriggio vestito di bianco, mi tolgo la giacca, accendo le luci e sul palco m'invento... (1980)
- Le mie strade (1981)
- Bollettino dei naviganti (1982)
- Gianni Togni (1983)
- Stile libero (1984)
- Segui il tuo cuore (1985)
- Di questi tempi (1987)
- Bersaglio mobile (1988)
- Singoli (1992)
- Cari amori miei (1996)
- Ho bisogno di parlare (1997)
- La vita nuova (2006)

Musicals

- Hollywood - Ritratto di un divo (1998)

== Influence ==
DJ Lhasa covered the song "Giulia", later remixed by Gabry Ponte. ??
