= Pierrot =

Stock character

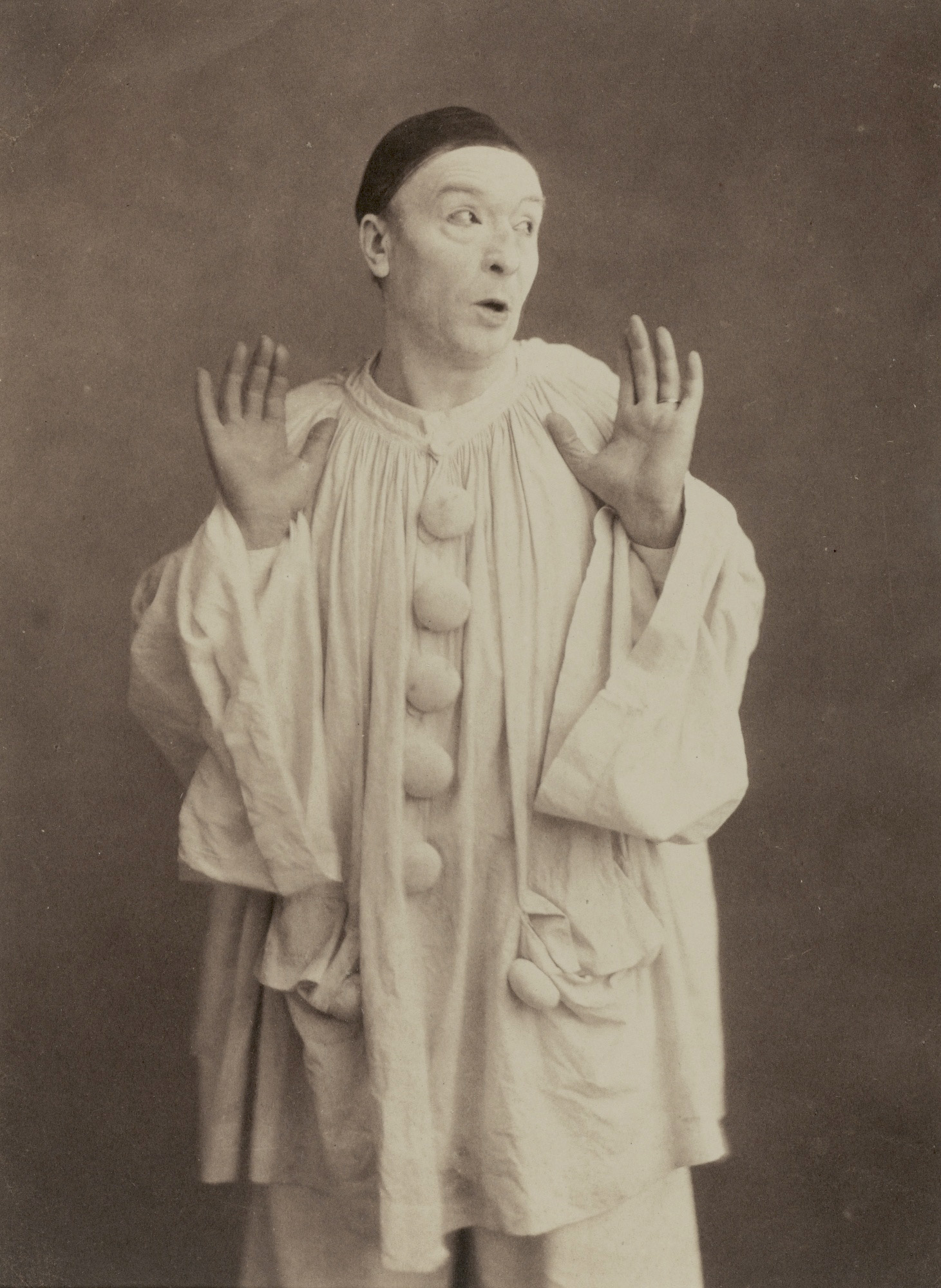
Paul Legrand as Pierrot, c. 1855. Photograph by Nadar.

Pierrot (/ˈpɪəroʊ/ PEER-oh, US also /ˈpiːəroʊ, ˌpiːəˈroʊ/ PEE-ə-roh, PEE-ə-ROH; French: [pjɛʁo]) is a stock character of pantomime and commedia dell'arte whose origins date back to the late 17th-century Italian troupe of players performing in Paris and known as the Comédie-Italienne. The name is a diminutive of Pierre (Peter), using the suffix -ot and derives from the Italian Pedrolino. His character in contemporary popular culture—in poetry, fiction, and the visual arts, as well as works for the stage, screen, and concert hall—is that of the sad clown, often pining for love of Columbine (who usually breaks his heart and leaves him for Harlequin). Performing unmasked, with a whitened face, he wears a loose white blouse with large buttons and wide white pantaloons. Sometimes he appears with a frilled collaret and a hat, usually with a close-fitting crown and wide round brim and, more rarely, with a conical shape like a dunce's cap.

Pierrot's character developed from that of a buffoon to become an avatar of the disenfranchised. Many cultural movements found him amenable to their respective causes: Decadents turned him into a disillusioned foe of idealism; Symbolists saw him as a lonely fellow-sufferer; Modernists made him into a silent, alienated observer of the mysteries of the human condition. Much of that mythic quality still adheres to the "sad clown" in the postmodern era.

== Origins: 17th century ==
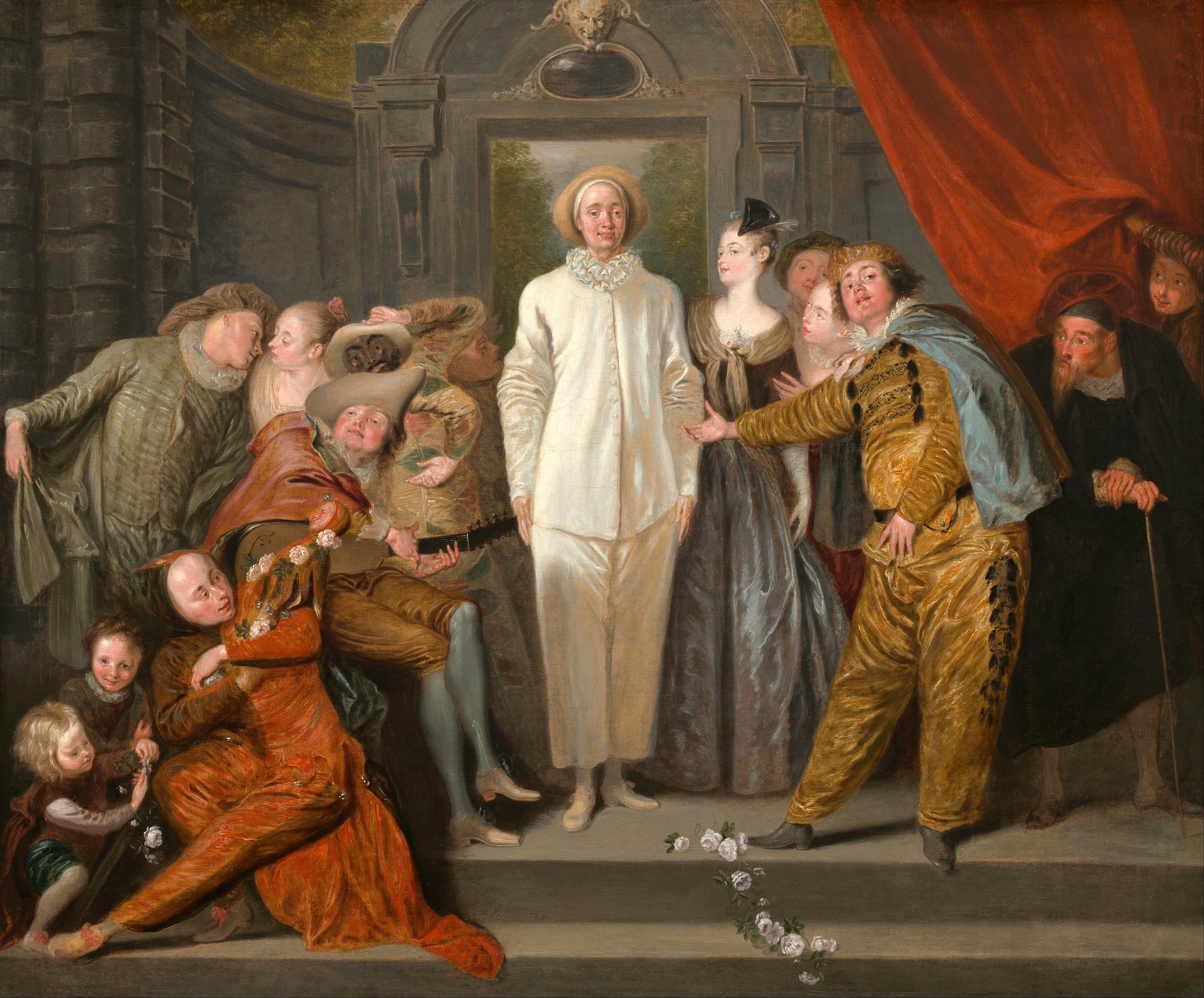
Antoine Watteau: Italian Actors, c. 1719. National Gallery of Art, Washington, D.C.

Pierrot is sometimes said to be a French variant of the sixteenth-century Italian Pedrolino, but the two types have little but their names ("Little Pete") and social stations in common. Both are comic servants, but Pedrolino, as a so-called "first" Zanni, often acts with cunning and daring, an engine of the plot in the scenarios where he appears. Pierrot, on the other hand, as a "second"' Zanni, stands "on the periphery of the action". He dispenses advice and courts his master's young daughter, Columbine, bashfully.

His origins among the Italian players in France go back to Molière's peasant Pierrot in Don Juan, or The Stone Guest (1665). In 1673, the Comédie-Italienne made its own contribution to the Don Juan legend with an Addendum to "The Stone Guest", which included Molière's Pierrot. Thereafter the character—sometimes a peasant, but more often now an Italianate "second" Zanni—appeared fairly regularly in the Italians' offerings, his role always taken by one Giuseppe Giaratone (or Geratoni, fl. 1639–1697).

Among the French dramatists writing roles for Pierrot were Jean de Palaprat, Claude-Ignace Brugière de Barante, Antoine Houdar de la Motte, and Jean-François Regnard. They present him as an anomaly among busy social personalities around him. Columbine laughs at his advances; his masters who are in pursuit of pretty young wives brush off his warnings to act their age. His isolation bears the pathos of Watteau's portraits.

== 18th century ==
=== France ===
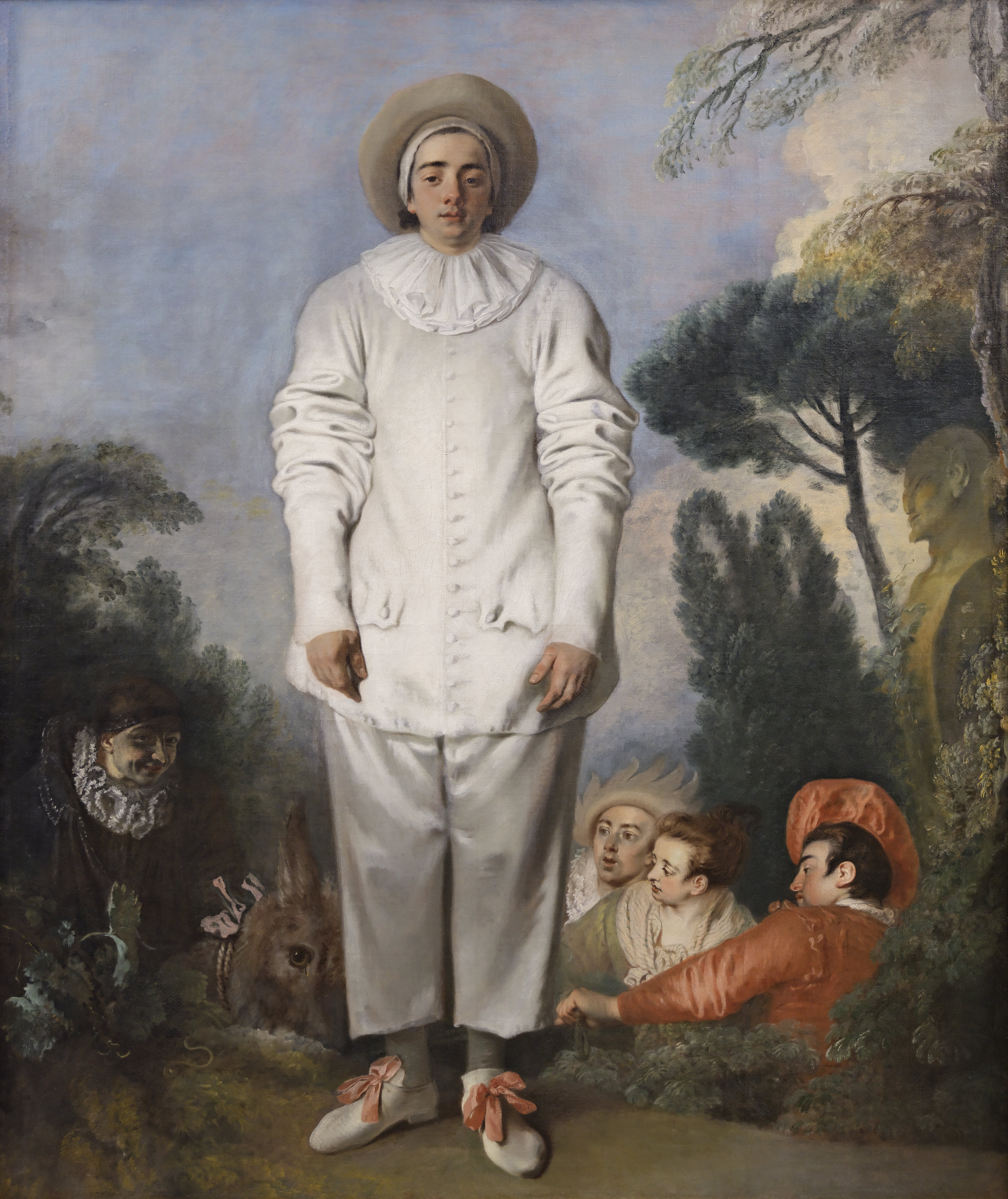
Antoine Watteau: Gilles (or Pierrot) and Four Other Characters of the Commedia dell'Arte, c. 1718. Musée du Louvre, Paris.

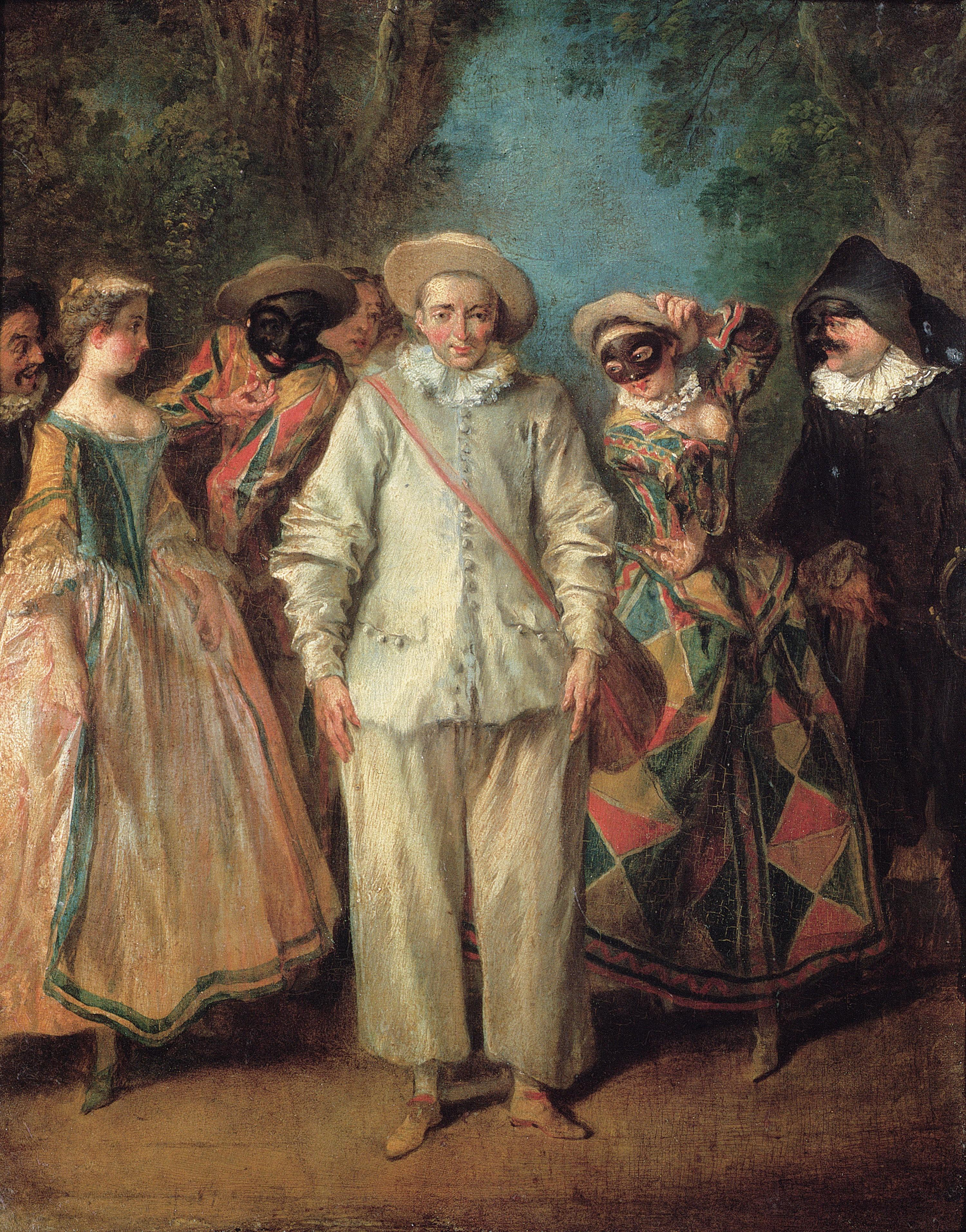
Nicolas Lancret: Actors of the Comédie-Italienne, between 1716 and 1736. Musée du Louvre, Paris.

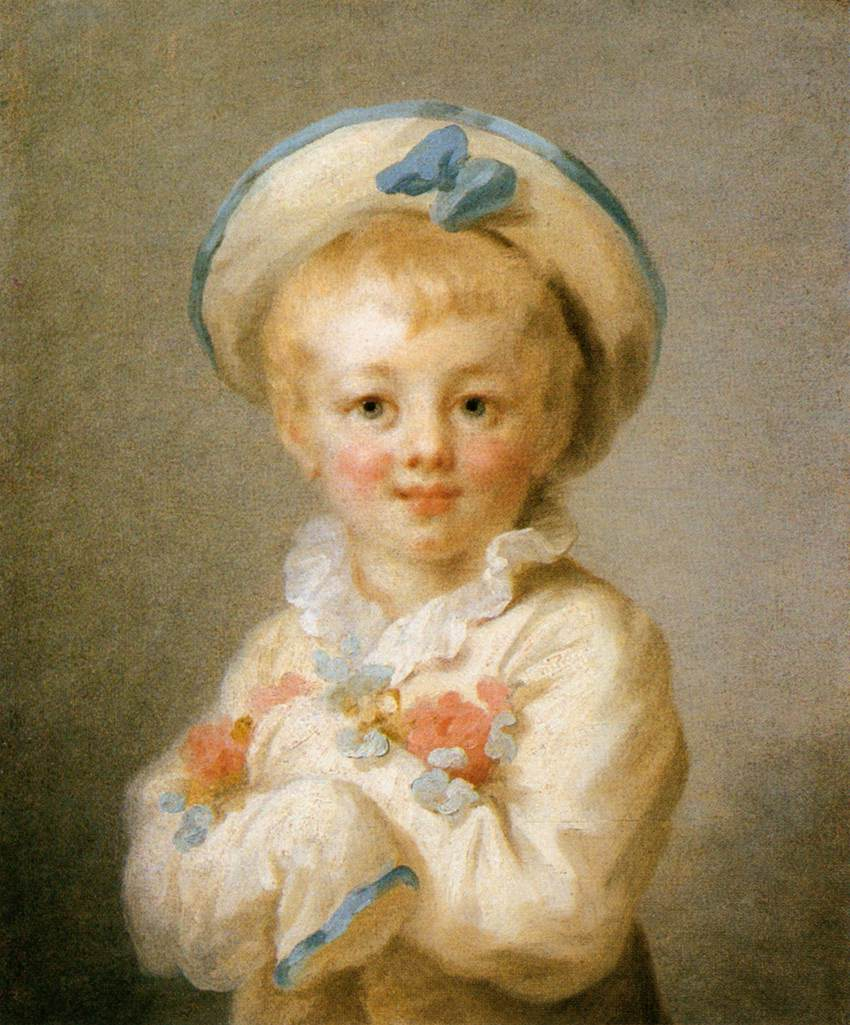
Jean-Honoré Fragonard: A Boy as Pierrot, between 1776 and 1780. The Wallace Collection, London.

An Italian company was called back to Paris in 1716, and Pierrot was reincarnated by the actors Pierre-François Biancolelli (son of the Harlequin of the banished troupe of players) and, after Biancolelli abandoned the role, the celebrated Fabio Sticotti (1676–1741) and his son Antoine Jean (1715–1772). But the character seems to have been regarded as unimportant by this company, since he appears infrequently in its new plays.

The character appeared often in the 18th century on Parisian stages. Sometimes he spoke gibberish, sometimes the audience itself sang his lines, inscribed on placards held aloft. He could appear as a valet, a cook, or an adventurer; his character is not strictly defined.

In the 1720s, Pierrot came into his own. In plays such as Trophonius's Cave (1722) and The Golden Ass (1725), one meets an engaging Pierrot. The accomplished comic actor Jean-Baptiste Hamoche portrayed him with success. After 1733, he rarely appears in new plays.

Pierrot also appeared in the visual arts and in folksongs ("Au clair de la lune"). The art of Claude Gillot (Master André's Tomb [c. 1717]), of Gillot's students Watteau (Italian Actors [c. 1719]) and Nicolas Lancret (Italian Actors near a Fountain [c. 1719]), of Jean-Baptiste Oudry (Italian Actors in a Park [c. 1725]), of Philippe Mercier (Pierrot and Harlequin [n.d.]), and of Jean-Honoré Fragonard (A Boy as Pierrot [1776–1780]), features him prominently.

=== England ===
As early as 1673, just months after Pierrot had made his debut in the Addendum to "The Stone Guest", Scaramouche Tiberio Fiorilli and a troupe assembled from the Comédie-Italienne entertained Londoners with selections from their Parisian repertoire. And in 1717, Pierrot's name first appears in an English entertainment: a pantomime by John Rich entitled The Jealous Doctor; or, The Intriguing Dame. Thereafter, until the end of the century, Pierrot appeared fairly regularly in English pantomimes (which were originally mute harlequinades; in the 19th century, the harlequinade was a "play within a play" during the pantomime), finding his most notable interpreter in Carlo Delpini (1740–1828). Delpini, according to the popular-theater historian, M. Willson Disher, "kept strictly to the idea of a creature so stupid as to think that if he raised his leg level with his shoulder he could use it as a gun." Pierrot was later displaced by the English clown.

=== Denmark ===
In 1800, a troupe of Italian players led by Pasquale Casorti performed in Dyrehavsbakken. Casorti's son, Giuseppe (1749–1826), began appearing as Pierrot in pantomimes, which now had a formulaic plot structure. Pierrot is still a fixture at Bakken, at nearby Tivoli Gardens and Tivoli Friheden in Aarhus.

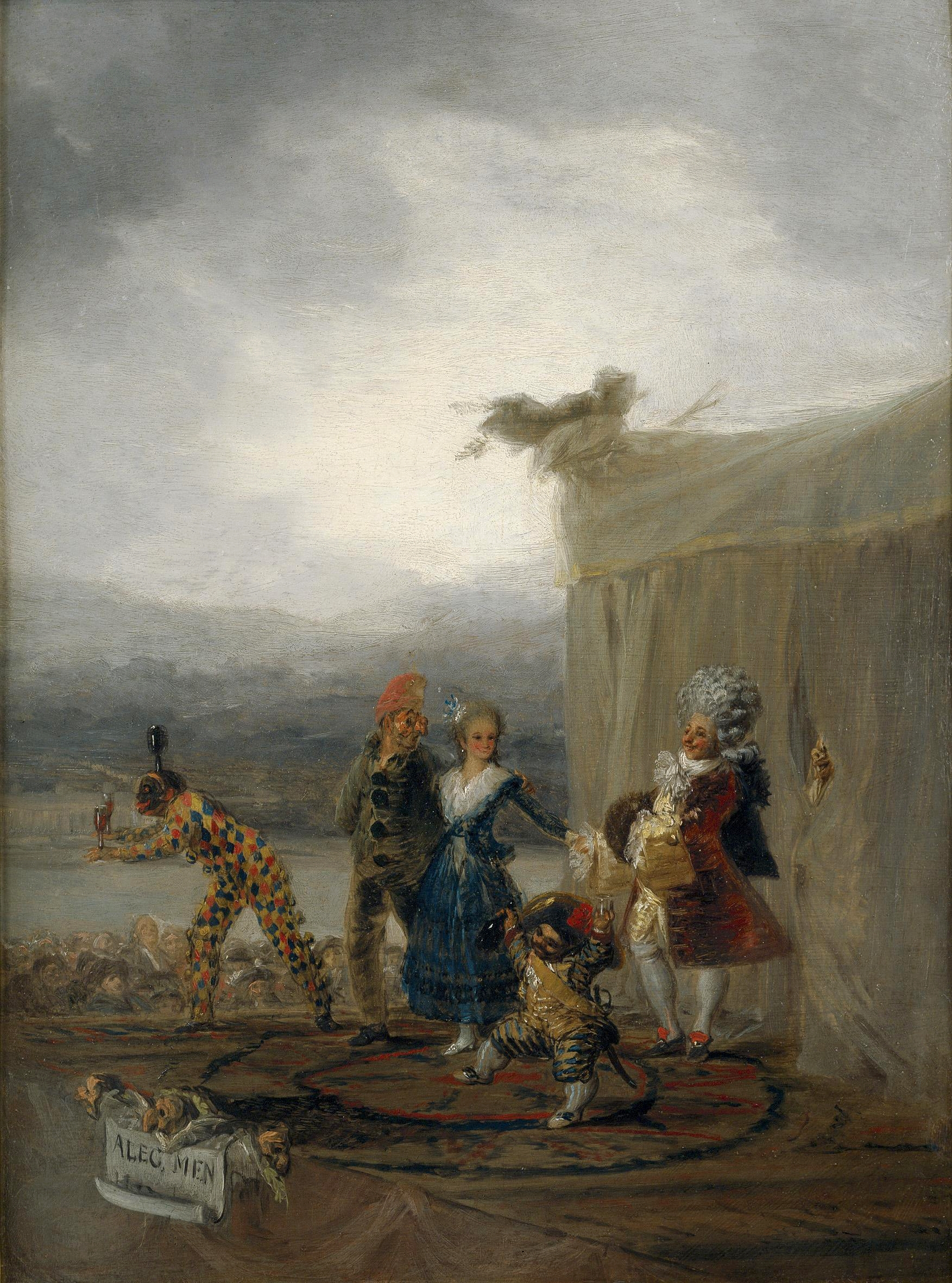
Francisco de Goya: Itinerant Actors (1793). Museo del Prado, Madrid.

=== Germany ===
Ludwig Tieck's The Topsy-Turvy World (1798) is an early—and highly successful—example of the introduction of the commedia dell'arte characters into parodic metatheater (Pierrot is a member of the audience watching the play).

=== Spain ===
The penetration of Pierrot and his companions of the commedia into Spain is documented in a painting by Goya, Itinerant Actors (1793). It foreshadows the work of such Spanish successors as Picasso and Fernand Pelez, both of whom also showed strong sympathy with the lives of traveling saltimbancos.

== 19th century ==
=== Pantomime of Deburau at the Théâtre des Funambules ===
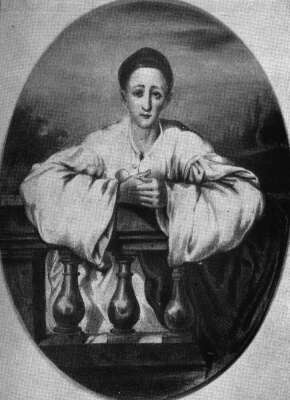
Auguste Bouquet: Jean-Gaspard Deburau, c. 1830

The Théâtre des Funambules was a little theater licensed in its early years to present only mimed and acrobatic acts. It was the home, beginning in 1816, of Jean-Gaspard (Baptiste) Deburau (1796–1846), the most famous Pierrot ever. He was immortalized by Jean-Louis Barrault in Marcel Carné's film Children of Paradise (1945).

Deburau, from the year 1825, was the only actor at the Funambules to play Pierrot, and he did so in several types of pantomime: rustic, melodramatic, "realistic", and fantastic. His style, according to Louis Péricaud, formed "an enormous contrast with the exuberance, the superabundance of gestures, of leaps, that ... his predecessors had employed". He altered the costume: he dispensed with the frilled collaret, substituted a skullcap for a hat, and greatly increased the wide cut of both blouse and trousers. Deburau's Pierrot avoided the crude Pierrots—timid, sexless, lazy, and greedy—found in earlier pantomime.

The Funambules Pierrot appealed to audiences in the faery-tale style which incorporate the commedia types. The plot often hinged on Cassander's pursuit of Harlequin and Columbine, having to deal with a clever and ambiguous Pierrot. Deburau early—about 1828—caught the attention of the Romantics. In 1842, Théophile Gautier published a fake review of a "Shakespeare" pantomime he claimed to have seen at the Funambules. It placed Pierrot in the company of over-reachers in high literature such as Don Juan or Macbeth.

=== Pantomime after Baptiste: Charles Deburau, Paul Legrand, and their successors ===
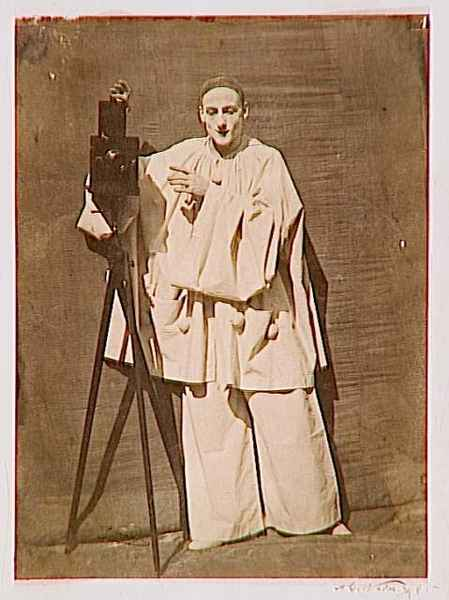
Nadar: Charles Deburau as Pierrot, 1854

Deburau's son, Jean-Charles (or, as he preferred, "Charles" [1829–1873]), assumed Pierrot's blouse the year after his father died. Another important Pierrot of mid-century was Charles-Dominique-Martin Legrand, known as Paul Legrand (1816–1898; see photo at top of page). He began appearing at the Funambules as Pierrot in 1845.

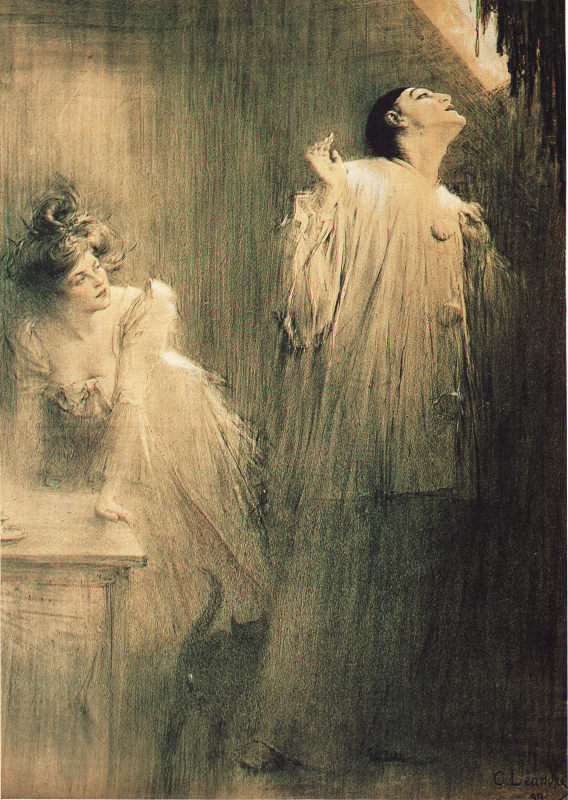
Georges Wague in one of the cantomimes (pantomimes performed to off-stage songs) of Xavier Privas. Poster by Charles Léandre, 1899.

Legrand left the Funambules in 1853 for the Folies-Nouvelles, which attracted the fashionable set, unlike the Funambules' working-class audiences. Legrand often appeared in realistic costume, his chalky face his only concession to tradition, leading some advocates of pantomime, such as Gautier, to lament that he was betraying the character of the type. Legrand's Pierrot influenced future mimes.

=== Pantomime and late 19th-century art ===
==== France ====
Popular and literary pantomime

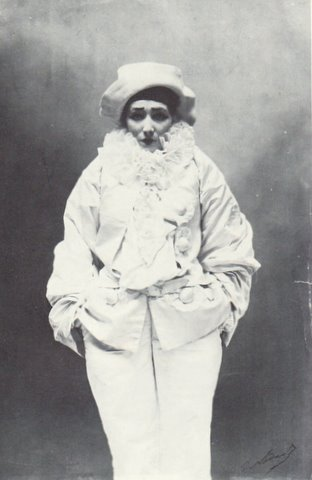
Atelier Nadar: Sarah Bernhardt in Jean Richepin's Pierrot the Murderer, 1883. Bibliothèque Nationale, Paris.

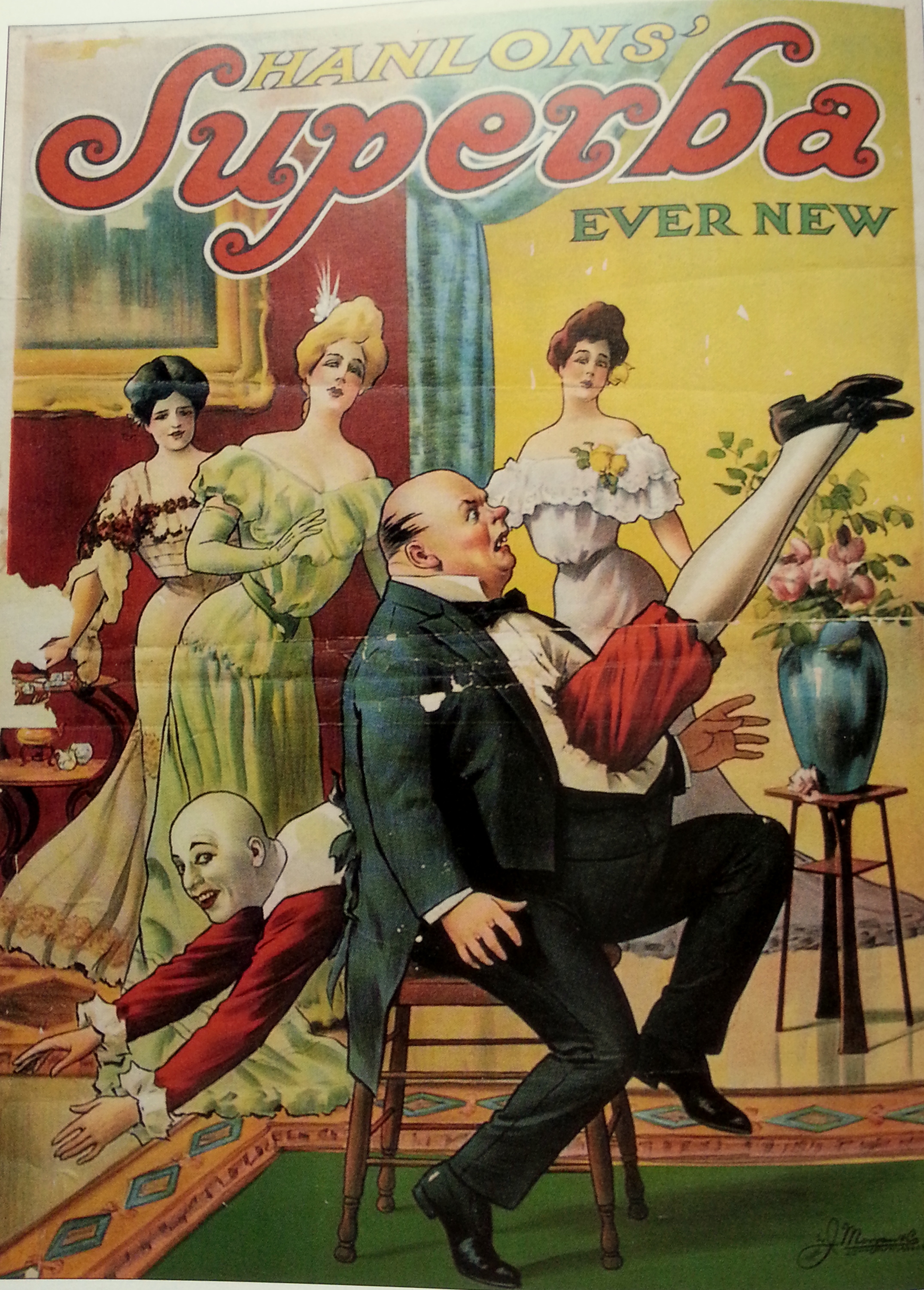
Anon.: Poster for Hanlon-Lees' Superba, 1890–1911. Theatre Collection of the New York Public Library at Lincoln Center.

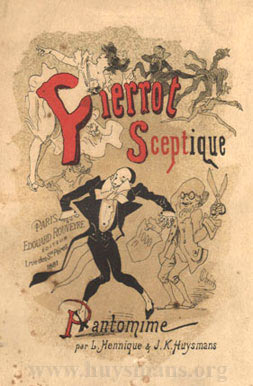
Jules Chéret: Title-page of Hennique and Huysmans' Pierrot the Skeptic, 1881

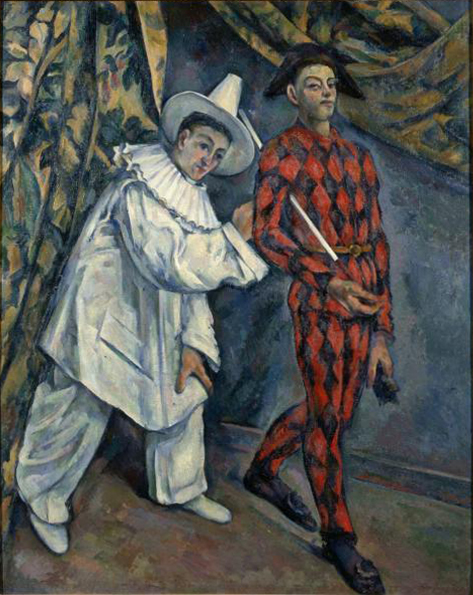
Paul Cézanne: Mardi gras (Pierrot and Harlequin), 1888, Pushkin Museum, Moscow

In the 1880s and 1890s, the pantomime reached a type of apogee, and Pierrot became ubiquitous. Moreover, he acquired a female counterpart, Pierrette, who rivaled Columbine for his affections. A Cercle Funambulesque was founded in 1888, and Pierrot (sometimes played by female mimes, such as Félicia Mallet) dominated its productions until its demise in 1898. Sarah Bernhardt even donned Pierrot's blouse for Jean Richepin's Pierrot the Murderer (1883).

But French mimes and actors were not the only figures responsible for Pierrot's ubiquity: the English Hanlon brothers (sometimes called the Hanlon-Lees), gymnasts and acrobats who had been schooled in the 1860s in pantomimes from Baptiste's repertoire, traveled (and dazzled) the world well into the 20th century with their pantomimic sketches and extravaganzas featuring riotously nightmarish Pierrots. The Naturalists—Émile Zola especially, who wrote glowingly of them—were captivated by their art. Edmond de Goncourt modeled his acrobat-mimes in his The Zemganno Brothers (1879) upon them; J.-K. Huysmans (whose Against Nature [1884] would become Dorian Gray's bible) and his friend Léon Hennique wrote their pantomime Pierrot the Skeptic (1881) after seeing them perform at the Folies Bergère (and, in turn, Jules Laforgue wrote his pantomime Pierrot the Cut-Up [Pierrot fumiste, 1882] after reading the scenario by Huysmans and Hennique). It was in part through the enthusiasm that they excited, coupled with the Impressionists' taste for popular entertainment, such as the circus and the music-hall, as well as the new bohemianism that then reigned in artistic quarters such as Montmartre (and which was celebrated by such denizens as Adolphe Willette, whose cartoons and canvases are crowded with Pierrots)—it was through all this that Pierrot achieved almost unprecedented currency and visibility towards the end of the century.

Affiche Distillerie de la Chabotte, Vins, liqueurs & spiritueux voor stokerij J. Fairon, collectie Jenevermuseum Hasselt

Visual arts, fiction, poetry, music, and film

He invaded the visual arts—not only in the work of Willette, but also in the illustrations and posters of Jules Chéret; in the engravings of Odilon Redon (The Swamp Flower: A Sad Human Head [1885]); and in the canvases of Georges Seurat (Pierrot with a White Pipe [Aman-Jean] [1883]; The Painter Aman-Jean as Pierrot [1883]), Léon Comerre (Pierrot [1884], Pierrot Playing the Mandolin [1884]), Henri Rousseau (A Carnival Night [1886]), Paul Cézanne (Mardi gras [Pierrot and Harlequin] [1888]), Fernand Pelez (Grimaces and Miseries a.k.a. The Saltimbanques [1888]), Pablo Picasso (Pierrot and Columbine [1900]), Guillaume Seignac (Pierrot's Embrace [1900]), Théophile Steinlen (Pierrot and the Cat [1889]), and Édouard Vuillard (The Black Pierrot [c. 1890]). The mime "Tombre" of Jean Richepin's novel Nice People (Braves Gens [1886]) turned him into a pathetic and alcoholic "phantom"; Paul Verlaine imagined him as a gormandizing naïf in "Pantomime" (1869), then, like Tombre, as a lightning-lit specter in "Pierrot" (1868, pub. 1882). Laforgue put three of the "complaints" of his first published volume of poems (1885) into "Lord" Pierrot's mouth—and dedicated his next book, The Imitation of Our Lady the Moon (1886), completely to Pierrot and his world (Pierrots were legion among the minor, now-forgotten poets: for samples, see Willette's journal The Pierrot, which appeared between 1888 and 1889, then again in 1891). In the realm of song, Claude Debussy set both Verlaine's "Pantomime" and Banville's "Pierrot" (1842) to music in 1881 (not published until 1926)—the only precedents among works by major composers being the "Pierrot" section of Telemann's Burlesque Overture (1717–22), Mozart's 1783 "Masquerade" (in which Mozart himself took the role of Harlequin and his brother-in-law, Joseph Lange, that of Pierrot), and the "Pierrot" section of Robert Schumann's Carnival (1835). Even the embryonic art of the motion picture turned to Pierrot before the century was out: he appeared, not only in early celluloid shorts (Georges Méliès's A Nightmare [1896], The Magician [1898]; Alice Guy's Arrival of Pierrette and Pierrot [1900], Pierrette's Amorous Adventures [1900]; Ambroise-François Parnaland's Pierrot's Big Head/Pierrot's Tongue [1900], Pierrot-Drinker [1900]), but also in Emile Reynaud's Praxinoscope production of Poor Pierrot (1892), the first animated movie and the first hand-colored one.

==== Belgium ====
In Belgium, Félicien Rops depicted a grinning Pierrot who witnesses an unromantic backstage scene (Blowing Cupid's Nose [1881]). James Ensor painted Pierrots obsessively, in various poses from prostrate to bowing his head in despondency, sometimes even with a smiling skeleton. The Belgian poet and dramatist Albert Giraud also identified with the Zanni: the fifty rondels of his Pierrot lunaire (Moonstruck Pierrot, 1884) inspired generations of composers (see Pierrot lunaire below), and his verse-play Pierrot-Narcissus (1887) offered a definitive portrait of the poet-dreamer. The choreographer Joseph Hansen staged the ballet Macabre Pierrot in 1884 in collaboration with the poet Théo Hannon.

==== England ====
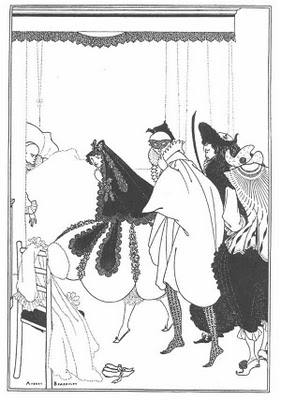
Aubrey Beardsley: "The Death of Pierrot", The Savoy, August 1896

Pierrot figured prominently in the drawings of Aubrey Beardsley, and various writers referenced him in their poetry. Ethel Wright painted Bonjour, Pierrot! (a greeting to a dour clown sitting disconsolate with his dog) in 1893. The Pierrot of popular taste also spawned a uniquely English entertainment. In 1891, the singer and banjoist Clifford Essex, resolved to create a troupe of English Pierrot entertainers, and called them the seaside Pierrots who, as late as the 1950s, performed on the piers of Brighton, Margate, and Blackpool. They inspired the Will Morris Pierrots, named after their Birmingham founder. They originated in the Smethwick area in the late 1890s and played to large audiences in the Midlands. Walter Westley Russell committed these performers to canvas in The Pierrots (c. 1900).

Pierrot's mask claimed the attention of the great theater innovator Edward Gordon Craig. Craig's involvement with the figure grew with time. In 1897, Craig, dressed as Pierrot, gave a quasi-impromptu stage-reading of Hans Christian Andersen's story "What the Moon Saw" as part of a benefit performance for theater artists in need.

==== Austria and Germany ====
Although he lamented that "the Pierrot figure was inherently alien to the German-speaking world", the playwright Franz Blei introduced him enthusiastically into his playlet The Kissy-Face: A Columbiade (1895), and his fellow-Austrians Richard Specht and Richard Beer-Hofmann made an effort to naturalize Pierrot—in their plays Pierrot-Hunchback (1896) and Pierrot-Hypnotist (1892, first pub. 1984), respectively—by linking his fortunes with those of Goethe's Faust. Still others among their countrymen simply sidestepped the issue of naturalization: Hermann Bahr took his inspiration for his Pantomime of the Good Man (1893) directly from his encounter with the exclusively French Cercle Funambulesque; Rudolf Holzer set the action of his Puppet Loyalty (1899), unapologetically, in a fabulous Paris; and Karl Michael von Levetzow settled his Two Pierrots (1900) in the birthplace of Pierrot's comedy, Italy.

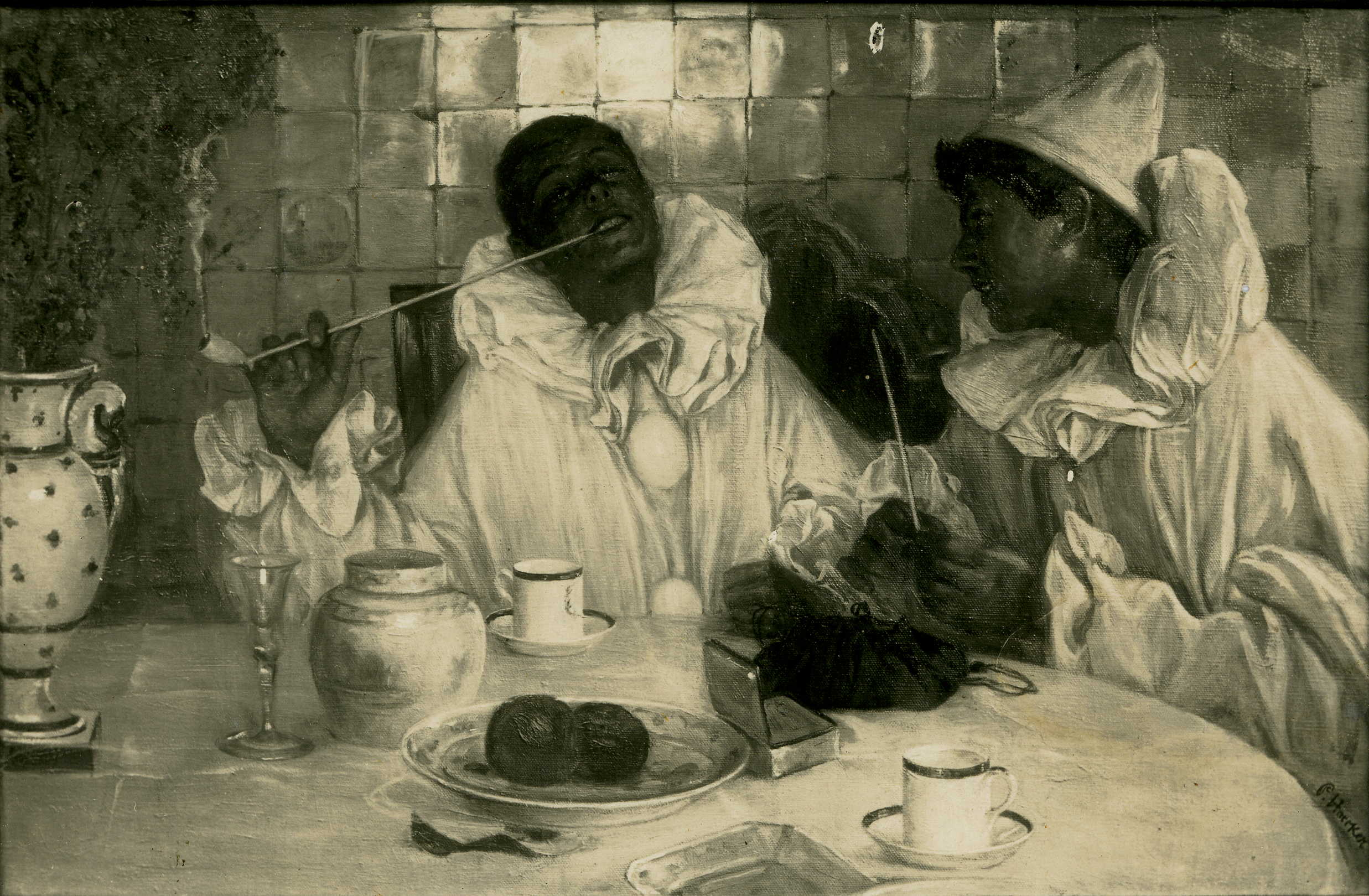
Paul Hoecker: Pierrots with Pipes, c. 1900. Location unknown.

In Germany, Frank Wedekind introduced the femme-fatale of his first "Lulu" play, Earth Spirit (1895), in a Pierrot costume. In a similar spirit, the painter Paul Hoecker put cheeky young men into Pierrot costumes to ape their complacent burgher elders in Pierrots with Pipes (c. 1900) and swilling champagne in Waiting Woman (c. 1895).

==== Italy ====
Canio's Pagliaccio in the famous opera Pagliacci (1892) by Leoncavallo is close enough to a Pierrot to deserve a mention here. Much less well-known is the work of two other composers—Mario Pasquale Costa and Vittorio Monti. Costa's pantomime L'Histoire d'un Pierrot (Story of a Pierrot), which debuted in Paris in 1893, was so admired in its day that it eventually reached audiences on several continents, was paired with Cavalleria Rusticana by New York's Metropolitan Opera Company in 1909, and was premiered as a film by Baldassarre Negroni in 1914. Its libretto, like that of Monti's "mimodrama" Noël de Pierrot a.k.a. A Clown's Christmas (1900), was written by Fernand Beissier, one of the founders of the Cercle Funambulesque. (Monti would go on to acquire his own fame by celebrating another spiritual outsider much akin to Pierrot—the Gypsy. His Csárdás [c. 1904], like Pagliacci, has found a secure place in the standard musical repertoire).

The portrait and genre painter Vittorio Matteo Corcos produced Portrait of Boy in Pierrot Costume in 1897.

==== Spain ====
In 1895, the playwright and future Nobel laureate Jacinto Benavente wrote rapturously in his journal of a performance of the Hanlon-Lees, and three years later he published his only pantomime: The Whiteness of Pierrot. A true fin de siècle mask, Pierrot paints his face black to commit robbery and murder; then, after restoring his pallor, he hides himself, terrified of his own undoing, in a snowbank—forever. Thus does he forfeit his union with Columbine (the intended beneficiary of his crimes) for a frosty marriage with the moon.

==== North America ====
Pierrot and his fellow masks were late in coming to the United States, which, unlike England, Russia, and the countries of continental Europe, had had no early exposure to commedia dell'arte. The Hanlon-Lees made their first U.S. appearance in 1858, and their subsequent tours, well into the 20th century, of scores of cities throughout the country accustomed their audiences to their fantastic, acrobatic Pierrots. But the Pierrot that would leave the deepest imprint upon the American imagination was that of the French and English Decadents, a creature who quickly found his home in the so-called little magazines of the 1890s (as well as in the poster-art that they spawned). One of the earliest and most influential of these in America, The Chap-Book (1894–98), which featured a story about Pierrot by the aesthete Percival Pollard in its second number, was soon host to Beardsley-inspired Pierrots drawn by E.B. Bird and Frank Hazenplug (the Canadian poet Bliss Carman should also be mentioned for his contribution to Pierrot's dissemination in mass-market publications such as Harper's). Like most things associated with the Decadence, such exotica discombobulated the mainstream American public, which regarded the little magazines in general as "freak periodicals" and declared, through one of its mouthpieces, Munsey's Magazine, that "each new representative of the species is, if possible, more preposterous than the last". And yet the Pierrot of that species was gaining a foothold elsewhere. The composers Amy Beach and Arthur Foote devoted a section to Pierrot (as well as to Pierrette, his Decadent counterpart) in two ludic pieces for piano—Beach's Children's Carnival (1894) and Foote's Five Bagatelles (1893).

The fin de siècle world in which this Pierrot resided was clearly at odds with the reigning American Realist and Naturalist aesthetic (although such figures as Ambrose Bierce and John LaFarge were mounting serious challenges to it). It is in fact jarring to find the champion of American prose Realism, William Dean Howells, introducing Pastels in Prose (1890), a volume of French prose-poems containing a Paul Margueritte pantomime, The Death of Pierrot, with words of warm praise (and even congratulations to each poet for failing "to saddle his reader with a moral"). So uncustomary was the French Aesthetic viewpoint that, when Pierrot made an appearance in Pierrot the Painter (1893), a pantomime by Alfred Thompson, set to music by the American composer Laura Sedgwick Collins, The New York Times covered it as an event, although it was only a student production. It was found to be "pleasing" because, in part, it was "odd". Not until the first decade of the next century, when the great (and popular) fantasist Maxfield Parrish worked his magic on the figure, would Pierrot be comfortably naturalized in America.

Of course, writers from the United States living abroad—especially in Paris or London—were aberrantly susceptible to the charms of the Decadence. Such a figure was Stuart Merrill, who consorted with the French Symbolists and who compiled and translated the pieces in Pastels in Prose. Another was William Theodore Peters, an acquaintance of Ernest Dowson and other members of the Rhymers' Club and a driving force behind the conception and theatrical realization of Dowson's Pierrot of the Minute (1897; see England above). Of the three books that Peters published before his death (of starvation) at the age of forty-two, his Posies out of Rings: And Other Conceits (1896) is most notable here: in it, four poems and an "Epilogue" for the aforementioned Dowson play are devoted to Pierrot (from the mouth of Pierrot loquitur: "Although this pantomime of life is passing fine,/Who would be happy must not marry Columbine").

Another pocket of North-American sympathy with the Decadence—one manifestation of what the Latin world called modernismo—could be found in the progressive literary scene of Mexico, its parent country, Spain, having been long conversant with the commedia dell'arte. In 1897, Bernardo Couto Castillo, another Decadent who, at the age of twenty-two, died even more tragically young than Peters, embarked on a series of Pierrot-themed short—"Pierrot Enamored of Glory" (1897), "Pierrot and His Cats" (1898), "The Nuptials of Pierrot" (1899), "Pierrot's Gesture" (1899), "The Caprices of Pierrot" (1900)—culminating, after the turn of the century (and in the year of Couto's death), with "Pierrot-Gravedigger" (1901). For the Spanish-speaking world, according to scholar Emilio Peral Vega, Couto "expresses that first manifestation of Pierrot as an alter ego in a game of symbolic otherness ...".

==== Central and South America ====
Inspired by the French Symbolists, especially Verlaine, Rubén Darío, the Nicaraguan poet widely acknowledged as the founder of Spanish-American literary modernism (modernismo), placed Pierrot ("sad poet and dreamer") in opposition to Columbine ("fatal woman", the arch-materialistic "lover of rich silk garments, golden jewelry, pearls and diamonds") in his 1898 prose-poem The Eternal Adventure of Pierrot and Columbine.

==== Russia ====
In the last year of the century, Pierrot appeared in a Russian ballet, Harlequin's Millions a.k.a. Harlequinade (1900), its libretto and choreography by Marius Petipa, its music by Riccardo Drigo, its dancers the members of St. Petersburg's Imperial Ballet. It would set the stage for the later and greater triumphs of Pierrot in the productions of the Ballets Russes.

== 19th-century legacy ==
The Pierrot bequeathed to the 20th century had acquired a rich and wide range of personae. He was the naïve butt of practical jokes and amorous scheming (Gautier); the prankish but innocent waif (Banville, Verlaine, Willette); the narcissistic dreamer clutching at the moon, which could symbolize many things, from spiritual perfection to death (Giraud, Laforgue, Willette, Dowson); the frail, neurasthenic, often doom-ridden soul (Richepin, Beardsley); the clumsy, although ardent, lover, who wins Columbine's heart, or murders her in frustration (Margueritte); the cynical and misogynistic dandy, sometimes dressed in black (Huysmans/Hennique, Laforgue); the Christ-like victim of the martyrdom that is Art (Giraud, Willette, Ensor); the androgynous and unholy creature of corruption (Richepin, Wedekind); the madcap master of chaos (the Hanlon-Lees); the purveyor of hearty and wholesome fun (the English pier Pierrots)—and various combinations of these. Like the earlier masks of commedia dell'arte, Pierrot now knew no national boundaries. Thanks to the international gregariousness of modernism, he would soon be found everywhere.

== Pierrot and modernism ==
Pierrot played a seminal role in the emergence of modernism in the arts. He was a key figure in every art form except architecture.

=== Poetry and fiction ===
T. S. Eliot's "breakthrough work", "The Love Song of J. Alfred Prufrock" (1915), owed its existence to the poems of Jules Laforgue, whose "ton 'pierrot'" informed all of Eliot's early poetry. (Laforgue, he said, "was the first to teach me how to speak, to teach me the poetic possibilities of my own idiom of speech.") Prufrock is a Pierrot transplanted to America.

Another prominent Modernist, Wallace Stevens, was undisguised in his identification with Pierrot in his earliest poems and letters—an identification that he later complicated and refined through such avatars as Bowl (in Bowl, Cat and Broomstick [1917]), Carlos (in Carlos Among the Candles [1917]), and, most importantly, Crispin (in "The Comedian as the Letter C" [1923]).

William Faulkner began his career as a chronicler of Pierrot's amorous disappointments and existential anguish in such little-known works as his play The Marionettes (1920) and the verses of his Vision in Spring (1921), works that were an early and revealing declaration of the novelist's "fragmented state" (some critics have argued that Pierrot stands behind the semi-autobiographical Nick Adams of Faulkner's fellow-Nobel laureate Ernest Hemingway, and another contends that James Joyce's Stephen Dedalus, again an avatar of his own creator, also shares the same parentage).

=== Performing arts ===
In music, historians of modernism generally place Arnold Schoenberg's 1912 song-cycle Pierrot lunaire at the very pinnacle of high-modernist achievement.

In ballet, Igor Stravinsky's Petrushka (1911), in which the traditionally Pulcinella-like clown wears the heart of Pierrot, is often argued to have attained the same stature.

As for the drama, Pierrot was a regular fixture in the plays of the Little Theatre Movement (Edna St. Vincent Millay's Aria da Capo [1920], Robert Emmons Rogers' Behind a Watteau Picture [1918], Blanche Jennings Thompson's The Dream Maker [1922]), which nourished the careers of such important Modernists as Eugene O'Neill, Susan Glaspell, and others.

=== Visual arts ===
Students of modernist painting and sculpture are familiar with Pierrot (in many different attitudes, from the ineffably sad to the ebulliently impudent) through the masterworks of his acolytes, including Pablo Picasso, Juan Gris, Georges Rouault, Salvador Dalí, Max Beckmann, August Macke, Paul Klee, and Jacques Lipchitz. The list is extensive. See Visual arts in Cultural references to Pierrot for more.

=== Film ===
In film, a beloved early comic hero was the Little Tramp of Charlie Chaplin, who conceived the character, in Chaplin's words, as "a sort of Pierrot".

As the diverse incarnations of the 19th-century Pierrot would predict, the hallmarks of the modernist Pierrot are his ambiguity and complexity.

One of his earliest appearances was in Alexander Blok's The Puppet Show (1906), called by one theater-historian "the greatest example of the harlequinade in Russia". Vsevolod Meyerhold, who both directed the first production and took on the role, dramatically emphasized the multifacetedness of the character: according to one spectator, Meyerhold's Pierrot was "nothing like those familiar, falsely sugary, whining Pierrots. Everything about him is sharply angular; in a hushed voice he whispers strange words of sadness; somehow he contrives to be caustic, heart-rending, gentle: all these things yet at the same time impudent."

== Pierrot lunaire ==
The fifty poems that were published by Albert Giraud (born Emile Albert Kayenbergh) as Pierrot lunaire: Rondels bergamasques in 1884 were set to music several times. The best known version is by Arnold Schoenberg, i.e., his Opus 21: Dreimal sieben Gedichte aus Albert Girauds Pierrot lunaire (Thrice-Seven Poems from Albert Giraud's Pierrot lunaire—Schoenberg was numerologically superstitious). This led, among other things, to ensemble groups' appropriating Pierrot's name, such as the English Pierrot Players (1967–70). The Pierrot behind those cycles has invaded worlds well beyond those of composers, singers, and ensemble-performers. Theatrical groups such as the Opera Quotannis have brought Pierrot's Passion to the dramatic stage; dancers such as Glen Tetley have choreographed it; poets such as Wayne Koestenbaum have derived original inspiration from it. It has been translated into still more distant media by painters, such as Paul Klee; fiction-writers, such as Helen Stevenson; filmmakers, such as Bruce LaBruce; and graphic-novelists, such as Antoine Dodé. A passionately sinister Pierrot Lunaire has even shadowed DC Comics' Batman. Pierrot is aptly honored in the title of a song by the British rock-group The Soft Machine: "Thank You Pierrot Lunaire" (1969).

== Carnivals ==
Pierrot appears among the revelers at various international carnivals. His name suggests kinship with the Pierrot Grenade of Trinidad and Tobago Carnival, being a satire on the richer and more respectable Pierrot. Pierrot Grenade was a finely dressed masquerader and deeply supreme scholar/jester proud of his ability to spell any word in his own fashion and quoting Shakespearean characters as Julius Caesar, Mark Anthony, and Othello at length.

== See also ==
- Commedia dell'arte
- Columbine
- Clown
- Hanswurst – a stock character of German travelling theater
- Pickelhering – a 17th-century stock buffoon character originating in German travelling theater

== Bibliography ==
- Adams, Jad (2002). Madder music, stronger wine: the life of Ernest Dowson, poet and decadent. London: Tauris Parke Paperbacks. ISBN 1860647146.
- Andrews, Richard (2008). The Commedia dell'Arte of Flaminio Scala: a translation and analysis of 30 scenarios. Lanham, Maryland: The Scarecrow Press. ISBN 9780810862074.
- Barberet, Vincent (1887). Lesage et le Théâtre de la Foire. Nancy: P. Sordoillet.
- Bonnassies, Jules (1875). Les spectacles forains et la Comédie-Française ... Paris: E. Dentu.
- Bonnet, Gilles, ed. (2008). Pantomimes fin-de-siècle. Paris: Kimé. ISBN 978-2841744473.
- Bonnet, Gilles (2014). La pantomime noire: 1836-1896. Paris: Hermann. ISBN 978-2705688844.
- Bordet, Daniel (2003). Les 100 plus belles images de Pierrot. Paris: Musée Cointreau. ISBN 2952035113.
- Brinkmann, Reinhold (1997). "The fool as paradigm: Schoenberg's Pierrot Lunaire and the modern artist". In Boehmer, Konrad, ed. (1997). Schoenberg and Kandinsky: an historic encounter. Amsterdam: Harwood Academic Publishers. ISBN 9057020467.
- Buttel, Robert (1967). Wallace Stevens: the making of Harmonium. Princeton, NJ: Princeton University Press. ISBN 0691061378.
- Calvert, Dave (2013). "From Pedrolino to a Pierrot: the origin, ancestry, and ambivalence of the British Pierrot Troupe". Popular Entertainment Studies. 4 (1): 6–23.
- Campardon, Emile (1877). Les spectacles de la Foire ...: documents inédits recueillis aux archives nationales. 2 vols. Paris: Berger-Levrault et C^{ie}. Vol. I at Archive.org. Vol. II at Gallica Books.
- Campardon, Emile (1880). Les Comédiens du Roi de la Troupe Italienne pendant les deux derniers siècles: documents inédits recueillis aux archives nationales. 2 vols. Paris: Berger-Levrault et C^{ie}. Vols. I and II at Archive.org.
- Carr, Andrew T. (March 1956). "Pierrot Grenade". Caribbean Quarterly. 4 (3/4): 281–314. doi:10.1080/00086495.1956.11829678.
- Champfleury (Jules-François-Félix Husson, called Fleury, called) (1859). Souvenirs des Funambules. Paris: Lévy Frères.
- Chaplin, Charles (1966). My autobiography. New York: Pocket Books.
- Clayton, J. Douglas (1993). Pierrot in Petrograd: Commedia dell'Arte/Balagan in twentieth-century Russian theatre and drama. Montreal: McGill-Queen's University Press. ISBN 0773511369.
- Cosdon, Mark (2010). The Hanlon Brothers: from daredevil acrobatics to spectacle pantomime, 1833–1931. Carbondale, IL: Southern Illinois University Press. ISBN 978-0809329250.
- Courville, Xavier de (1943–1958). Luigi Riccoboni dit Lélio (un apôtre de l'art du théâtre au XVIII^{e} siècle). Vol. 3 vols. Paris: L' Arche.
- Craig, Edward Gordon (1912). "The actor and the Über-Marionette". On the art of the theatre. London: William Heinemann.
- Deutsch, Otto Erich (1966). Mozart: a documentary biography. Stanford, CA: Stanford University Press. ISBN 0713603798.
- Dick, Daniella (2013). "'Marked you that?': Stephen Dedalus, Pierrot". In Ferrer, Daniel, Sam Slote, and André Topia, eds. (2013). Renascent Joyce. Gainesville, FL: University Press of Florida. pp. 69–80. ISBN 978-0-8130-4245-9.
- Disher, M. Willson (1925). Clowns and pantomimes. London: Constable.
- Duchartre, Pierre-Louis (1929). The Italian Comedy. Translated by Weaver, Randolph T. London: George G. Harrap and Co., Ltd.
- Dunsby, Jonathan (1992). Schoenberg: Pierrot Lunaire (Cambridge Music Handbooks). Cambridge: Cambridge University Press. ISBN 0521387159.
- Findlater, Richard (1978). Joe Grimaldi, his life and theatre. Cambridge, Eng.: Cambridge University Press. ISBN 0521222214.
- Fournier, Edouard (1885). Etudes sur la vie et les oeuvres de Molière .... Paris: Laplace, Sanchez et C^{ie}.
- Gautier, Théophile (1858–1859). Histoire de l'art dramatique en France depuis vingt-cinq ans. 6 vols. Paris: Edition Hetzel.
- Gherardi, Evaristo, ed. (1721). Le Théâtre Italien de Gherardi ou le Recueil général de toutes les comédies et scènes françoises jouées par les Comédiens Italiens du Roy .... 6 vols. Amsterdam: Michel Charles le Cene. Vols. I, II, III, IV, V, and VI at Google Books.
- Giraud, Albert (2001). Albert Giraud's "Pierrot lunaire". Translated by Richter, Gregory C. Kirksville, MO: Truman State University Press. ISBN 1-931112-02-9.
- Green, Martin & Swan, John (1993). The triumph of Pierrot: the Commedia dell'Arte and the modern imagination. New ed. University Park, PA: Pennsylvania State University Press. ISBN 002545420X.
- Gueullette, T.-S. (1938). Notes et souvenirs sur le Théâtre-Italien au XVIII^{e} siècle. Pub. J.-E. Gueullette. Paris: E. Droz.
- Hall, Michael (2015). Music theatre in Britain, 1960-1975. Woodbridge, UK: The Boydell Press. ISBN 978-1783270125.
- Janin, Jules (1881). Deburau, histoire du Théâtre à Quatre Sous pour faire suite à l'histoire du Théâtre-Français. 1832. Rpt. in 1 vol., Paris: Librairie des Bibliophiles.
- Kellein, Thomas (1995). Pierrot: melancholie und maske. Munich: Prestel. ISBN 3791314351.
- Kerrigan, Michael (2015). Gustav Klimt, art nouveau, and the Vienna secessionists. London: Flame Tree Publishing. ISBN 978-1-78361-608-4.
- Klingler, Oskar (1902). Die Comédie-Italienne in Paris nach der Sammlung von Gherardi. Strassburg: K.J. Trübner.
- Lawner, Lynne (1998). Harlequin on the moon: commedia dell'arte and the visual arts. New York: H.N. Abrams. ISBN 0-8109-1194-9.
- Lesage, Alain-René, Dorneval (1724–1737). Le Théâtre de la Foire ou l'Opéra-Comique, contenant les meilleures pièces qui ont été représentées aux Foires de S. Germain & de S. Laurent. 10 vols. Paris: Pierre Gandouin.
- Maindron, Ernest (1896). Les affiches illustrées (1886–1895). Paris: Boudet.
- Margolin, Victor (1975). American poster renaissance. New York: Castle Books.
- Marsh, Roger (2007a). "'A multicoloured alphabet': rediscovering Albert Giraud's Pierrot Lunaire". Twentieth-Century Music. 4 (1: March): 97–121.
- Marsh, Roger (2007b). "The translations". In booklet accompanying CDs: Roger Marsh—Albert Giraud's Pierrot lunaire, fifty rondels bergamasques. With The Hilliard Ensemble, Red Byrd, Juice, Ebor Singers & Paul Gameson director, Linda Hirst, Joe Marsh narrator. NMC Recordings: Cat. No. NMC D127.
- Martinez, Ariane (2008). La pantomime, théâtre mineur: 1880-1945. Paris: Presses Sorbonne nouvelle. ISBN 978-2878544169.
- Meldolesi, Claudio (1969). Gli Sticotti: comici italiani nei teatri d'Europa del Settecento. Rome: Edizioni di storia e letteratura. ISBN 8884987687.
- Merrill, Stuart, tr. (1890). Pastels in prose. Introduction by William Dean Howells. New York: Harper & Brothers.
- Mic, Constant (1927). La Commedia dell'Arte, ou le théâtre des comédiens italiens des XVI^{e}, XVII^{e} & XVIII^{e} siècles. Paris: J. Schiffrin.
- Millay, Edna St. Vincent (1921). Aria da Capo. New York: Mitchell Kennerley.
- Moore, Marianne (2005). Schulman, Grace (ed.). The poems of Marianne Moore. London: Penguin Classics. ISBN 0-14-303908-3.
- Muddiman, Bernard (1921). The men of the nineties. New York: G. P. Putnam's Sons.
- Muñoz Fernández, Ángel (2001). Bernardo Couto Castillo. Cuentos completos. México City: Factoría Ediciones.
- Nicoll, Allardyce (1931). Masks, mimes and miracles. London: Harrap & Co.
- Nicoll, Allardyce (1963). The world of Harlequin: a critical study of the commedia dell'arte. Cambridge, England: Cambridge University Press.
- Nouveau Théâtre Italien (Le) ou Recueil général des comédies représentées par les Comédiens Italiens ordinaries du Roi (1753). 10 vols. Paris: Briasson.
- Nye, Edward (2014): "Jean-Gaspard Deburau: romantic Pierrot". New theatre quarterly, 30:2 (May): 107-119.
- Nye, Edward (2015-2016): "The romantic myth of Jean-Gaspard Deburau". Nineteenth-century French studies, 44: 1 & 2 (Fall-Winter): 46-64.
- Nye, Edward (2016): "The pantomime repertoire of the Théâtre des Funambules", Nineteenth century theatre and film, 43: 1 (May): 3-20.
- Oreglia, Giacomo (1968) [1961]. The Commedia dell'Arte. Translated by Edwards, Lovett F. Originally published in Italian; revised in 1964. New York: Hill and Wang. ISBN 9780809005451.
- Palacio, Jean de (1990). Pierrot fin-de-siècle, ou, Les métamorphoses d'un masque. Paris: Séguier. ISBN 287736089X.
- Pandolfi, Vito (1957–1969). La Commedia dell'Arte, storia e testo. 6 vols. Florence: Sansoni Antiquariato.
- Parfaict, François and Claude, and Godin d'Abguerbe (1767). Dictionnaire des théâtres de Paris ... . Vol. 3. Paris: Rozet.
- Péricaud, Louis (1897). Le Théâtre des Funambules, ses mimes, ses acteurs et ses pantomimes .... Paris: Sapin.
- Peral Vega, Emilio (2015). Pierrot/Lorca: white carnival of black desire. Woodbridge, Suffolk, Eng.: Tamesis Books. ISBN 978-1855662964.
- Pertwee, Bill (1979). Pertwee's promenades and Pierrots: one hundred years of seaside entertainment. Newton Abbot (Eng.): Westbridge Books. ISBN 0715377949.
- Piron, Alexis (1928–1931). Œuvres complètes illustrées. Pub. Pierre Dufay. 10 vols. Paris: F. Guillot.
- Régnier, Gérard (2004). The great parade: portrait of the artist as clown. New Haven, CT: Yale University Press. ISBN 0300103751.
- Rémy, Tristan (1954). Jean-Gaspard Deburau. Paris: L'Arche.
- Rémy, Tristan (1964). George Wague: le mime de la Belle Epoque. Paris: Girard.
- Ritter, Naomi (1989). Art as spectacle: images of the entertainer since Romanticism. Columbia, MO: University of Missouri Press. ISBN 0826207197.
- Robert, Grace (1946). The Borzoi book of ballets. New York: Alfred A. Knopf.
- Rolfe, Bari (1978). "Magic century of French mime". Mime, mask & marionette. 1 (3: fall): 135-58.
- Rudlin, John (1994). Commedia dell'Arte: an actor's handbook. London: Routledge. ISBN 0-415-04770-6.
- Salerno, Henry F., tr. (1967). Scenarios of the Commedia dell'Arte: Flaminio Scala's Il teatro delle favole rappresentative. New York: New York University Press.
- Sand, Maurice (Jean-François-Maurice-Arnauld, Baron Dudevant, called) (1915). The history of the harlequinade [orig. Masques et bouffons. 2 vols. Paris: Michel Lévy Frères, 1860]. Philadelphia: Lippincott.
- Sansone, Matteo (2017). "Pierrot: a silent witness of changing times". Voyages: Journal of Contemporary Humanism. 6 (winter): unpaginated. Archived from the original on 22 September 2020.
- Sarabia, Rosa (Fall 1987). "Dario y Lugones: dos visiones modernistas de Pierrot". Latin American Theatre Review. 21 (1): 75–83.
- Sensibar, Judith L. (1984). The origins of Faulkner's art. Austin, TX: University of Texas Press. ISBN 0292790201.
- Séverin (Séverin Cafferra, called) (1929). L'Homme Blanc: souvenirs d'un Pierrot. Introduction et notes par Gustave Fréjaville. Paris: Plon.
- Starobinski, Jean (1970). Portrait de l'artiste en saltimbanque. Geneva: Skira.
- Stevenson, Helen (1995). Pierrot Lunaire. London: Hodder and Stoughton. ISBN 0-340-61823-X.
- Storey, Robert F. (1978a). Pierrot: a critical history of a mask. Princeton, NJ: Princeton University Press. ISBN 0-691-06374-5.
- Storey, Robert (Fall 1978). "Shakespeare at the Funambules: a translation of Théophile Gautier's 'Shakspeare aux Funambules' and a commentary". Mime, Mask & Marionette. 1 (3): 159–79.
- Storey, Robert (1985). Pierrots on the stage of desire: nineteenth-century French literary artists and the comic pantomime. Princeton, NJ: Princeton University Press. ISBN 0-691-06628-0.
- Švehla, Jaroslav (1977). "Jean Gaspard Deburau: the immortal Pierrot". Tr. Paul Wilson. Mime Journal: 5 (this journal-length article is a translated condensation of Švehla's book-length study Deburau, nieśmiertelny Pierrot [Prague: Melantrich, 1976]).
- Symons, Arthur (1919). The Symbolist Movement in literature. Revised and enlarged edition. New York: E.P. Dutton & Company.
- Taupin, René (1929). L'influence du symbolisme français sur la poésie américaine (de 1910 à 1920). Paris: H. Champion.
- Vilain, Robert (1997). "An innocent abroad: the Pierrot figure in German and Austrian literature at the turn of the century". Publications of the English Goethe Society. 67 (1): 69–99. doi:10.1080/09593683.1997.11716298.
- Wague, Georges (1913). La pantomime moderne, conférence prononcé le 19 janvier 1913, dans la salle de l'Université Populaire. Paris: Editions de l'Université Populaire.
- Wilentz, Sean (2010). Bob Dylan in America. New York: Doubleday. ISBN 978-0-385-52988-4.
