= Pierrot lunaire (book) =

Cycle of 50 poems published in 1884 by Albert Giraud

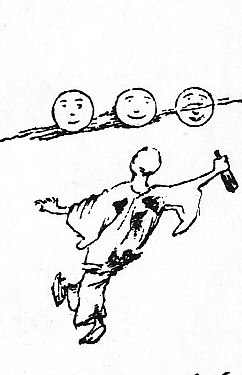
Adolphe Willette: A drunken Pierrot dances beneath the Moon. Detail of cartoon from Le Chat noir, January 17, 1885.

Pierrot lunaire: rondels bergamasques (Moonstruck Pierrot: bergamask rondels) is a cycle of fifty poems published in 1884 by the Belgian poet Albert Giraud (born Emile Albert Kayenbergh), who is usually associated with the Symbolist Movement. The protagonist of the cycle is Pierrot, the comic servant of the Italian Commedia dell'Arte and, later, of Parisian boulevard pantomime. The early 19th-century Romantics, Théophile Gautier most notably, had been drawn to the figure by his Chaplinesque pluckiness and pathos, and by the end of the century, especially in the hands of the Symbolists and Decadents, Pierrot had evolved into an alter-ego of the artist, particularly of the so-called poète maudit. He became the subject of numerous compositions, theatrical, literary, musical, and graphic.

Giraud's collection is remarkable in several respects. It is among the most dense and imaginatively sustained works in the Pierrot canon, eclipsing by the sheer number of its poems Jules Laforgue's celebrated Imitation of Our Lady the Moon (1886). Its poems have been set to music by an unusually high number of composers (see Settings in various media below), including one, Arnold Schoenberg, who derived from it one of the landmark masterpieces of the 20th century. Finally, it is noteworthy for the number of themes of the fin-de-siècle—which is to say, of Symbolism, the Decadence, and early Modernism—that it elaborates within the tight confines of Giraud's verse form:

- the growing materialism and vulgarity of late-19th-century life, and the artist's flight into an interior world;
- the quest of that artist for a purity and untrammeled freedom of the soul, often through a derangement of the senses (advocated most famously by Arthur Rimbaud) via the ecstasy of music or drugs like alcohol;
- the deconstruction of romantic love, inspired in part by a skepticism à la Arthur Schopenhauer and a growing scientific candor (which will result in Krafft-Ebing's Psychopathia Sexualis of 1886) about sex;
- the dogging of young genius by disease, especially consumption, leading to the facile equation (elaborated notoriously in the Degeneration of Max Nordau) of modern art with degeneracy;
- the assumption of a religious burden by the modern artist, and his or her consequent ascension as prophet;
- the transmutation of art into a hermeticism (vide Stéphane Mallarmé, T.S. Eliot, James Joyce, Rainer Maria Rilke) through which it can be enriched with sacred value, spared the gaze of the philistine, and engaged with the dissonant incongruities of modern life: Giraud's poems are non-linear fragments shored against Pierrot's ruins;
- and yet finally: an undermining of the whole enterprise by self-mockery and irony, calling the high creative project (and the motives of the artist indulging in it) in doubt.

== Verse form, style, and structure ==
Each of Giraud's poems is a rondel, a form he admired in the work of the Parnassians, especially of Théodore de Banville. (It is a "bergamask" rondel, not only because the jagged progress of the poems recalls the eponymous rustic dance, but also because 19th-century admirers of the Commedia dell'Arte characters [or "masks"] often associated them with the Italian town of Bergamo, from which Harlequin is said to have hailed.) Unlike many of the Symbolist poets (though certainly not all: Verlaine, Mallarmé, even the early Rimbaud and Laforgue, worked comfortably within strict forms), Giraud was committed to traditional techniques and structures as opposed to the comparatively amorphous constraints of free verse. He exclaimed to his friend Emile Verhaeren, after reading the latter's Les Moines (The Monks), "What I disapprove of with horror, what angers and irritates me is your improvising disdain for verse form, your profound and vertiginous ignorance of prosody and language." Such an attitude leads the critic Robert Vilain to conclude that, while Giraud shared "the Symbolists' concern for the careful, suggestive use of language and the power of the imagination to penetrate beyond the surface tension of the here-and-now", he was equally committed to a Parnassian aesthetic. He adheres to the sparer of the rondel forms, concluding each poem with a quintet rather than a sestet and working within rather strictly observed eight-syllable lines. As is customary, each poem is restricted to two rhymes alone, one masculine, the other feminine, resulting in a scheme of ABba abAB abbaA, in which the capital letters represent the refrains, or repeated lines. Within this austere structure, however, the language is—to use Vilain's words—"suggestive" and the imaginative penetration beneath the "here-and-now" daring and provocative.

Like Laforgue after him, Giraud uses neologisms ("Bourrèle!" ["Executioner!" or "Torturer!"]), unusual word choices ("patte" [which usually means "paw"] for Pierrot's foot), and ambiguities ("Arlequin porte un arc-en-ciel", meaning "Harlequin bears [or carries or wears] a rainbow") to enrich the fantastic atmosphere of the poems. His syntax is sometimes elliptical or fractured, as in the first line of the cycle: "Je rêve un théâtre de chambre" ("I dream a chamber theater"), instead of the usual "Je rêve d'un théâtre de chambre". And the imagery, especially in the similes, traffics often in the jarringly unexpected. Sometimes it is lyrically tender (clouds are "like splendid fins/Of chameleonic fish of the sky" [12: "The Clouds"]); sometimes it is shockingly brutal (Pierrot's thought of his "last mistress", the gallows, "is like a nail/That drunkenness drives into his head" [17: "The Gallows' Song"]). At its most dreamlike, it has a disturbing obscurity of reference ("sinister"—and unexplained—"black butterflies" swarm in the sky and blot out the sun [19: "Black Butterflies"]); at times it suspends all laws of materiality (a moonbeam penetrates the "varnished case" of a violin to caress its "soul" with its "irony"—"like a luminous white bow" [32: "Lunar Violin"]). The result is Dalí-esque: a series of sharply etched transcriptions of proto-Surreal visions. "With its Baroque intensity of detail and its fin de siècle aura", as Giraud's American translator writes, "Pierrot Lunaire is a work not to be forgotten."

Because the rondel is such a tightly "closed" form, each poem seems to stand as an independent unit, isolated from the other poems around it. Giraud heightens this sense of disconnection by eschewing sustained narrative, presenting Pierrot's situation as a series of stark vignettes. Sometimes these vignettes are clustered rather coherently (as in those dealing with Pierrot-as-modern-Christ—27: "The Church", 28: "Evocation", 29: "Red Mass", and 30: "The Crosses"), but, more often than not, they seem random in their placement (and thus may be explained, at least in part, Schoenberg's not scrupling to change their order in his song-cycle). The effect of all these structural and stylistic techniques is both comic and unsettling, as the poem "Disappointment" (4: "Déconvenue") suggests:

Les convives, fourchette au poing,
Ont vu subtiliser les litres,
Les rôtis, les tourtes, les huîtres,
Et les confitures de coing.

Des Gilles, cachés dans un coin,
Tirent des grimaces de pitres.
Les convives, fourchette au poing,
Ont vu subtiliser les litres.

Pour souligner le désappoint,
Des insectes aux bleus élytres,
Viennent cogner les roses vitres,
Et leur bourdon nargue de loin
Les convives, fourchette au poing.

Translation:

The guests, their forks in their fists,
Have seen the bottles disappear,
The roasts, the pies, the oysters,
And the quince jam.

A few Gilles, hidden in a corner,
Pull clown faces.
The guests, their forks in their fists,
Have seen the bottles disappear.

To underscore the disappointment,
Some insects with blue elytra
Come beating against the rose-colored panes,
And their distant buzzing taunts
The guests, their forks in their fists.

The scene is completely without context: the poem that precedes it, 3: "Pierrot-Dandy", is about Pierrot's making up his face with moonlight; the poem that follows it, 5: "Moon over the Wash-House", identifies the moon as a washerwoman. Nowhere else in the cycle is this party revisited; it is impossible, therefore, to understand the import of the gathering or the identity of the guests. (Are the "Gilles" among the guests? or are they part of the entertainment? Is it Pierrot who has whimsically stolen away the viands? or is it stingy Cassander?) The frozen gestures ("their forks in their fists"), the air of blank incomprehension (shared as much by the reader as by the guests), the finicking nicety of the language ("elytra" [pl. of "elytron" = "wing-case"]) all contribute to the ambiguous black comedy of the poem.

== Synopsis ==
In a familiar dichotomy of the Symbolists, Pierrot lunaire occupies a divided space: a public realm, over which the sun presides, and a private realm, dominated by the moon. The waking, sunlit world, populated by Pierrot's Commedia dell'Arte companions, is marked by deformity, degeneracy, avarice, and lust. Its Crispins are "ugly", and its Columbine "arches her back", apparently in expectation of sexual pleasure (1: "Theater"). The meretriciously multicolored Harlequin—"shining like a solar spectrum" (11: "Harlequin")—is an "artificial serpent" whose "essential goal" is "falsehood and deceit" (8: "Harlequinade"). An old serving-woman connives in his scheming by accepting a bribe to procure Columbine's favors (11: "Harlequin"). These puppets live under a sky swarming with "sinister black butterflies" that "seek blood to drink", having "extinguished the sun's glory" with their wings (19: "Black Butterflies"). The sun itself is nearing the end of that glory: at its setting it seems like a Roman reveler, "full of disgust", who slits his wrists and empties his blood into "filthy sewers" (20: "Sunset"). It is a "great sun of despair" (33: "The Storks").

Pierrot is of the dreaming, moonlit world. His is an enchanted interior space, in which sequestered violins are caressed by moonbeams, thereby setting their souls, "full of silence and harmony", thrumming (32: "Lunar Violin"). He lives there as an aloof isolato, encountering in a "sparkling polar icicle" a "Pierrot in disguise" (9: "Polar Pierrot") and seeking, "all along the Lethe", not Columbine the fickle woman but her ethereal floral namesakes—"pale flowers of moonbeams/Like roses of light" (10: "To Columbine"). The moon is, aptly, a "pale washerwoman" (5: "Moon over the Wash-House") whose ablutions minister chiefly to the mind. For Pierrot has lost the happy enchantments of the past: the moribund pantomimic world seems "absurd and sweet, like a lie" (37: "Pantomime"), and the "soul" of its old comedies, to which he sometimes mentally propels himself, with an imaginary oar of moonlight (36: "Pierrot's Departure"), is "like a soft crystal sigh" bemoaning its own extinction (34: "Nostalgia").

Now, at the end of the century, Pierrot resides in a "sad mental desert" (34: "Nostalgia"). He is bored and splenetic: "His strange, mad gaiety/Has flown away, like a white bird" (15: "Spleen"). Too often the moon seems like a "nocturnal consumptive" tossing about on the "black pillow of the skies", deceiving the "carefree lover passing by" into mistaking for "graceful rays/[Its] white and melancholy blood" (21: "Sick Moon"). When Pierrot cannot find relief in her customary magic—in the "strange absinthe" of her beams, this "wine that we drink with our eyes" (16: "Moon-Drunk")—he takes pleasure in tormenting his enemies: he makes music by drawing a bow across Cassander's pot-belly (6: "Pierrot's Serenade"); he bores a hole in his skull as a bowl for his pipe (45: "Cruel Pierrot"). (Cassander is a target because he is an "academician" [37: "Pantomime"], a dry-as-dust guardian of the Law.) Madness seems to be lurking at Pierrot's elbow, as when he makes up his face with moonlight (3: "Pierrot-Dandy"), then spends an evening trying to brush a spot of it from his black jacket (38: "Moon-Brusher"). At his most despairing, he is visited by thoughts of his "last mistress"—the gallows (17: "The Song of the Gallows"), at the end of whose rope he dangles in "his white Moon robe" (18: "Suicide"). That the moon, indeed, seems to connive in his extinction is suggested by its sometime appearance as "a white saber/On a somber cushion of watered silk" that threatens to come whistling down on Pierrot's neck (24: "Decapitation").

His consolation is that the art in which he resides will have eternal life: "Beautiful verses are great crosses/On which red Poets bleed" (30: "The Crosses"). The old succor of religion is replaced by that of poetry, but at a cost—and with a difference. What is summoned to "the altar of [these] verses" is not the gentle Mary but the "Madonna of Hysteria", who holds out "to the incredulous universe/[Her] Son, with his limbs already green,/His flesh sagging and decayed" (28: "Evocation"). To the assembled faithful, Pierrot offers his heart: "Like a red and horrible Host/For the cruel Eucharist" (29: "Red Mass"). The new Lamb of God is a consumptive, his Word a confession of both self-sacrifice and impotence.

And yet, for all the harshness of this portrait, the tone of the poems lightens considerably towards the end of the cycle. The dance of a "fine pink dust" on the horizon announces the sunrise in poem 41 ("Pink Dust"); Pierrot joins Harlequin and Columbine for a sumptuous repast in poem 48 ("Supper on the Water"); and in one of the last vignettes in which Pierrot appears, he is the possessor of a "bright and joyous lantern" (44: "The Lantern"), marking a turn from the dark Symbolist world to the light.

== The poet and Pierrot ==
Giraud's imagined identification of himself with his protagonist is complete; it is, in fact, often difficult to determine whether the subject of a given poem is Pierrot or Giraud. (To distinguish a "narrator" here is probably to make too nice a distinction.) The "I" that makes occasional appearances claims relation to Pierrot "through the Moon"; he lives, like Pierrot, "by sticking out. . ./[His] bleeding tongue at the Law" (13: "To my Bergamask Cousin"). Also like Pierrot, he "discovers drunken landscapes" in absinthe (22: "Absinthe") and savors the "morbid and mournful charm"—"Like a bloody drop of spittle/From a consumptive's mouth"—of melancholy music (26: "Chopin Waltz"). Both are nostalgic for Pierrot's past, that "adorable snow" of yesteryear, when the zanni of the old comedies was a "lyre-bearer,/Healer of wounded spirits" (31: "Plea"). And both are staunch in their commitment to an anti-materialistic idealism, Giraud seeing in the whiteness of Pierrot—and of snow, swans, and lilies—a "scorn of unworthy things" and a "disgust for weak hearts" (40: "Sacred Whitenesses"). Art they hold in worshipful regard: Giraud's book, his "poem", is "a ray of moonlight stoppered up/In a beautiful flagon of Bohemian glass" (50: "Bohemian Crystal"). But, paradoxically, both, as artists, are self-estranged: ironically, the interior quest for "sacred whitenesses", for a purity of soul, is synonymous with the assumption of a falsehood, a mask—one of theatrically clownish extravagance that borders on madness and fatal excess.

In 39: "The Alphabet", an apparent anomaly in the cycle, in which Giraud imagines himself as Harlequin, not Pierrot, the poet recalls dreaming, as a child, of "a multicolored alphabet,/In which each letter was a mask", a dream that agitates his "foolish heart" today. It is a revealing confession: an admission that the agents of his creations as an artist, the alphabet, are ideally not agents of self-expression but of self-fabrication under the mask of an Other. And this Other—Pierrot—is himself a fabrication, a mercurial puppet in a "chamber theater" of the mind (1: "Theater"). Pierrot lunaire offers a performance, not an expression, of the self—a fact in which much of its "modernity" resides.

== Settings in various media ==
In 1892, the poet and dramatist Otto Erich Hartleben published a German translation of Pierrot lunaire; he retained the rondel form of the poems, but he attempted no rhymes, altered line lengths, and made other substantive changes. Some commentators see his versions as improvements on the originals, although recent criticism has shifted somewhat in Giraud's favor. However their respective merits will eventually be judged, it was Hartleben's versions that first drew composers to the poems and that provide the texts for almost all of the early settings we have. The bullet-point that follows lists early 20th-century musical settings chronologically and notes the number of poems that were set by each composer (all, except Prohaska's, are in the Hartleben translations) and for which instruments.

- Pfohl, Ferdinand: 5 poems ("Moon-rondels, fantastic scenes from 'Pierrot Lunaire'") for voice and piano (1891); Marschalk, Max: 5 poems for voice and piano (1901); Vrieslander, Otto: 50 poems for voice and piano (46 in 1905, the remainder in 1911); Graener, Paul: 3 poems for voice and piano (c. 1908); Marx, Joseph: 4 poems for voice and piano (1909; 1 of 4, "Valse de Chopin", reset for voice, piano, and string quartet in 1917); Schoenberg, Arnold: 21 poems for speaking voice, piano, flute (also piccolo), clarinet (also bass clarinet), violin (also viola), and violoncello (1912); Kowalski, Max: 12 poems for voice and piano (1913); Prohaska, Carl: 6 poems for voice and piano (1920); Lothar, Mark: 1 poem for voice and piano (1921).

=== Arnold Schoenberg and Pierrot lunaire ===
The most famous and important of these settings is Schoenberg's atonal Thrice-Seven Poems from Albert Giraud's "Pierrot lunaire", scored for what is now known as the Pierrot ensemble and a Sprechstimme voice. "For all the rough critical ride Schoenberg's compositions have received in general," writes the musicologist Jonathan Dunsby, "Pierrot lunaire has come to be regarded since its first performance in 1912 as a masterpiece." And he continues:

Wherever we look in the history of its reception, whether in general histories of the modern period, in more ephemeral press response, in the comments of musical leaders like Stravinsky or Boulez, in pedagogical sources or in specialized research studies, the overwhelming reaction to Pierrot has been an awestruck veneration of its originality.

The most obvious manifestation of that originality is the Sprechstimme required of its vocalist, and among those who have met its challenges should be mentioned Albertine Zehme (who commissioned the work and performed, dressed as Columbine, in its first productions), Bethany Beardslee, Jan DeGaetani, and Christine Schäfer.

As an homage to Schoenberg, the English composers Peter Maxwell Davies and Harrison Birtwistle founded The Pierrot Players in 1967; they performed under that name until 1970. The similarly inspired Pierrot Lunaire Ensemble Wien, founded in Vienna by flautist Silvia Gelos and pianist Gustavo Balanesco, is still performing internationally.

In 1987, the Arnold Schoenberg Institute in Los Angeles commissioned the settings of the remaining twenty-nine poems that Schoenberg had neglected, utilizing the Pierrot ensemble (Sprechstimme optional), by sixteen American composers—Milton Babbitt, Leslie Bassett, Susan Morton Blaustein, Paul Cooper, Miriam Gideon, John Harbison, Donald Harris, Richard Hoffmann, Karl Kohn, William Kraft, Ursula Mamlok, Stephen L. Mosko, Marc Neikrug, Mel Powell, Roger Reynolds, and Leonard Rosenman. The settings were given their premieres between 1988 and 1990 in four concerts sponsored by the Institute. (The director of the Institute, Leonard Stein, added a setting of his own to the final concert of the project.)

Schoenberg's Pierrot has kindled inspiration not only among fellow composers but also among choreographers and singer-performers. Dancers who have staged Pierrot lunaire include the Russian-born American Adolph Bolm (1926), the American Glen Tetley (1962), the German Marco Goecke (2010) and the French Kader Belarbi (2011). Also, the avant-garde Triadic Ballet (1923) by Oskar Schlemmer and Paul Hindemith was inspired by Schoenberg's song-cycle. The theatrical/operatic possibilities of Schoenberg's score have been realized by at least two major ensembles: the Opera Quotannis, which staged a version of Pierrot lunaire (with singer Christine Schadeberg) at the New School for Social Research in 1995 and, more recently, the internationally acclaimed contemporary music sextet eighth blackbird, which premiered a "cabaret opera" dramatizing the Schoenberg cycle in 2009. Its percussionist, Matthew Duvall, played Pierrot, and, in addition to the remaining five musicians and a singer/speaker, Lucy Shelton, the production included a dancer, Elyssa Dole. The work, which was toured in 2012 to mark the centennial of Schoenberg's composition of Pierrot lunaire, was conceived, directed, and choreographed by Mark DeChiazza.

In the summer of 2014, the freelance curator Niamh White, composer Ewan Campbell, and pianist Alex Wilson founded the British arts collective The Pierrot Project in an attempt "to create events that combined both music and art, and to establish opportunities for talented young artists and musicians to work together in unique, informal settings for large cross-arts audiences." The first of its events unfolded in the fall of that same year, when the music group Dr. K Sextet, which had been born at London's Royal College of Music in 2009, performed extracts from Pierrot lunaire, accompanied by an exhibition of artworks responding to each of its three sections (October 2014); mounted a "Pierrot-Kabarett" featuring new settings of Schoenberg's Brettl-Lieder (January 2015); and offered original interpretive responses to the central "dark" section of Pierrot lunaire (April 2015). Subsequently, the Project commissioned artists Tim A. Shaw, Jörg Obergfell, and Sara Naim to work with composers Ewan Campbell, Stef Conner, and Chris Roe to create "collaborative works that explore Schönberg's life, mind and work, for an exclusive 2 week showing at Display Gallery in London: 5th-17th February 2016," preceded by a February 4 concert by the Dr. K Sextet, which performed among the resulting installations. Known as The Pierrot Studio, this new project was staged in a "psychic, virtual or imagined" recreation of Schoenberg's own studio, furnished with "re-imaginings of Schönberg's 'miusical' sketches and painted self portraits." The programs included an abstract light-and-sound "rendering of Schönberg's moonscape in Pierrot Lunaire" and "a series of masks and musical motives" conjuring up "the various archetypal Pierrot characters."

Schoenberg has attracted at least one prominent parodist: in 1924, Hanns Eisler, a student of Schoenberg, published Palmström (Studies on 12-tone Rows), in which a Sprechstimme vocalist, singing texts by Christian Morgenstern, parodies the musical lines of Pierrot to the accompaniment of flute (or piccolo), clarinet, violin (or viola), and violoncello.

=== Re-enter Giraud: the French poems renascent ===
Beginning in the early 1980s, scholars and musicians began to take a fresh look at Giraud's original texts, thereby initiating an implicit interrogation of the superiority of the Hartleben translations. Two works are especially illustrative of this development. The first, the volume Pierrot Lunaire, of 1982, is a retranslation of the Hartleben versions back into French by the poets Michel Butor and Michel Launay, who conclude their work with poems of their own inspired by Giraud. The second, Variations: Beyond Pierrot (1995), is a work by the American composer Larry Austin. Each of its three ten-minute sections features a Sprechstimme soprano who sings fragments of Schoenberg's 21 selections accompanied by flute, clarinet, violin, cello, and piano. She sometimes renders those fragments in Giraud's original French, sometimes in Hartleben's German, at other times in English and Japanese. Drawing upon live computer-processed sound and computer-processed prerecorded tape, the composition attempts (in Austin's words) to go "beyond Schoenberg's musical melodrama" to create a "multi-lingual dream of the essences of the poems".

In 2001 and 2002, the British composer Roger Marsh set all fifty of the original French poems for a (mostly) a cappella group of singers. Sometimes they sing in French accompanied by a narrator, whose English translations are woven into the music; sometimes they sing in both French and English; sometimes they speak the poems in both languages (in various combinations). The few songs entirely in French are intended to be glossed by action in performance. Instruments occasionally brought in, usually solo, are violin, cello, piano, organ, chimes, and beatbox. The English texts were derived from literal translations of Giraud's poems by Kay Bourlier.

Giraud's original texts (and apparently one of Hartleben's) also stand behind the Seven Pierrot Miniatures (2010) by the Scottish composer Helen Grime, though hers cannot be called "settings", since voice and words are absent. The seven poems she selected—12: "The Clouds", 2: "Decor", 22: "Absinthe", 18: "Suicide", 27: "The Church", 20: "Sunset", and "The Harp", none used by Schoenberg—were merely "points of departure" for her suite for mixed ensemble.

=== Beyond both Giraud and Hartleben: Pierrot lunaire reimagined ===
In 2013, the Arab-American composer Mohammed Fairouz set the poet Wayne Koestenbaum's ten Pierrot Lunaire poems (2006)—all original in content, though retaining titles from the Giraud/Schoenberg cycles—to a theatrical score for tenor and the Pierrot ensemble. In these new settings, Pierrot, "erotomane, cinéaste, clown, troubadour, analysand, synaesthete", goes wandering "through circles of a moonlit inferno, where he confronts shadows of charmed, histrionic luminaries", including Susan Sontag, Virginia Woolf, Patty Duke, Mae West, and Diana Vreeland.

The painters Paul Klee, Federico García Lorca, Theodor Werner, Marc Chagall, Markus Lüpertz, and Fernando Botero have all produced a Pierrot Lunaire (in 1924, 1928, 1942, 1969, 1984, and 2007, respectively). The British writer Helen Stevenson published a Chinese-box-like, postmodern set of variations on Giraud's poems in her 1995 novel Pierrot Lunaire, and Bruce LaBruce released his Canadian/German film Pierrot Lunaire, a gender-bending interpretation of the Schoenberg cycle, in 2014. Pierrot Lunaire is also a familiar figure in postmodern popular art: like the American experimental/drone music artist John DeNizio, Brazilian, Italian, and Russian rock groups have called themselves Pierrot Lunaire. The Soft Machine, a British group, included the song "Thank You Pierrot Lunaire" in its 1969 album Volume Two; the Scottish musician Momus included the track "Pierrot Lunaire" in his 2003 album Oskar Tennis Champion; and the avant-pop star Björk, known for her interest in avant-garde music, performed Schoenberg's Pierrot Lunaire at the 1996 Verbier Festival with Kent Nagano conducting. In 2011, the French graphic novelist Antoine Dodé published the first volume of his projected trilogy, Pierrot Lunaire, and in issue #676 of DC Comics, Batman R.I.P.: Midnight in the House of Hurt (2008), Batman acquired a new nemesis, who shadowed him—and plotted against Robin, the Boy Wonder—for ten more issues: his name was Pierrot Lunaire.
