= 1898 in film =

The following is an overview of the events of 1898 in film, including a list of films released and notable births. The Spanish–American War was a popular subject. Several films made by Col. William N. Selig dealt with the subject of war preparations at Camp Tanner in Springfield, Illinois, including Soldiers at Play, Wash Day in Camp and First Regiment Marching.

== Events ==
- May 19 – Vitagraph is founded in New York.
- August 27 – Alfred John West gives a Royal Command Performance to Queen Victoria of film from the cruise of HMS Crescent at Osborne House.
- Birt Acres invents the first amateur format, Birtac, by splitting 35 mm film into two halves of 17.5 mm.

== Films released in 1898 ==
- The Accursed Cavern, directed by George Melies
- The Astronomer's Dream, directed by Georges Méliès; re-released in 1899 as A Trip to the Moon
- The Ball Game
- The Cavalier's Dream, directed by Edwin S. Porter
- The Cave of the Demons, directed by George Melies
- Come Along, Do!, directed by Robert W. Paul. First multi-scene film in cinema [In this film 2 scenes are edited together for the first time in cinema]
- Corbett and Sharkey Fight
- The Corsican Brothers, produced by G.A.S. Films (British)
- The Damnation of Faust, directed by George Melies
- Dewar's It's Scotch, the first advertising movie, produced by the Edison Studios
- Don Juan Tenorio, the first Mexican film with a plot, directed by Salvador Toscano
- Eiffel Tower, directed by Louis Lumière. First (sort of) crane shot in cinema [It was taken from the ascending elevator in the Eiffel Tower]
- Ella Lola, a la Trilby, produced by the Edison Co.
- Faust and Mephistopheles, directed by George Albert Smith
- The Four Troublesome Heads, directed by Georges Méliès
- The Humpty Dumpty Circus, directed by J. Stuart Blackton
- Jizo the Spook, Japanese (a.k.a. Bake Jizo)
- The Magician, directed by Georges Méliès
- The Mesmerist, directed by George Albert Smith.
- The Miller and the Sweep, directed by George Albert Smith
- The Nearsighted School Teacher
- A Novice at X-Rays, directed by George Melies
- Pack Train On Chilkoot Pass, film shows landscape in Chilkoot Pass, Alaska or British Columbia
- Panorama de Manila (Manila landscape), one of the earliest Philippine films shot and produced by a Spanish soldier, Antonio Ramos showing some Manila sceneries.
- Photographing a Ghost, directed by George Albert Smith
- Santa Claus, directed by George Albert Smith. May include the first example of parallel action in a motion picture
- Shinen no sosei (a.k.a. Resurrection of a Ghost), Japanese
- Smích a pláč (Laugh and Tears), directed by Josef Šváb-Malostranský, the first Czech film
- Surrender of General Toral
- A Switchback Railway

== Debuts ==
- Josef Šváb-Malostranský
- Johnston Forbes-Robertson – Macbeth
- Salvador Toscano

== Births ==
Month	Date	Name	Country	Profession	Died
January
January	16	Irving Rapper	US	Director	1999
January	20	John George	US	Actor	1968
January	22	Denise Legeay	France	Actress	1968
January	22	Sergei Eisenstein	Russia	Director	1948
January	23	Randolph Scott	US	Actor	1987
February	10	Robert Keith	US	Actor	1966
February	19	Václav Wasserman	Czechia	Actor, screenwriter, director	1967
March	11	Dorothy Gish	US	Actress	1968
March	27	Alma Tell	US	Actress	1934
April	9	Paul Robeson	US	Singer, Actor	1976
April	21	Walter Forde	UK	Director	1984
April	23	Ernest Laszlo	Hungary	Cinematographer	1984
April	26	John Grierson	Scotland	Documentary Filmmaker	1972
May	16	Kenji Mizoguchi	Japan	Director, screenwriter	1956
May	23	Frank McHugh	US	Actor	1981
June	30	George Chandler	US	Actor	1985
July	10	Renée Björling	Sweden	Actress	1975
July	13	Ivan Triesault	US	Actor	1980
July	19	Olle Hilding	Sweden	Actor	1983
July	23	Bengt Djurberg	Sweden	Actor	1941
August	13	Regis Toomey	US	Actor	1991
August	30	Shirley Booth	US	Actress	1992
September	10	Bessie Love	US	Actress	1986
September	14	Hal B. Wallis	US	Producer	1986
September	16	Baruch Lumet	US	Actor	1992
September	23	Jadwiga Smosarska	Poland	Actress	1971
September	27	Charles Williams	US	Actor, writer	1958
October	3	Leo McCarey	US	Director	1969
October	18	Lotte Lenya	Austria	Singer, Actress	1981
November	18	Andrés Soler	Mexico	Actor	1969
November	29	Rod La Rocque	US	Actor	1969
December	5	Grace Moore	US	Operatic Soprano, Actress	1947
December	20	Irene Dunne	US	Actress	1990

=== Date unknown ===
- Monang Carvajal, Filipina actress (died 1980)
