= The Magician (1898 film) =

- Screenshot from the film
- Directed by: Georges Méliès
- Produced by: Georges Méliès
- Starring: Georges Méliès
- Release date: 1898
- Running time: 1 minute
- Country: France
- Language: Silent

The Magician (French: Le Magicien; Star Film Catalogue no. 153.) is an 1898 French silent trick film directed by Georges Méliès, featuring a wizard, a Pierrot and a sculptor in a rapid series of substitution splices. The film is, "another exercise in the art of the jump-cut," according to Michael Brooke of BFI Screenonline, "in the tradition of Georges Méliès' earlier A Nightmare (Le Cauchemar, 1896) and The Haunted Castle (Le Château hanté, 1897)."

== Synopsis ==
The Magician (1898)

A wizard conjures a table and a box out of thin air, and then vanishes as he jumps toward the box. Pierrot emerges from the box and takes a seat, when suddenly a banquet appears on the table, but it vanishes along with the table and chair before he can eat. A man in an Elizabethan doublet taps him on the shoulder and he is transformed into a Renaissance sculptor. Lifting a half finished bust onto a pedestal he prepares to set to work on it with a hammer and chisel only for it to come to life and snatch his tools from him. He attempts to embrace the sculpture only for it to disappear and reappear in a variety of poses. Finally the Elizabethan man reappears to kick him in the rump.

== Cast ==
- Georges Méliès as Le Sculpteur

== Current status ==
Given its age, this short film is available to freely download from the Internet.
