= Albert Giraud =

Belgian poet

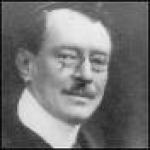
- Albert Giraud (1890)
- Born: Emile Albert Kayenbergh; 23 June 1860; Leuven, Belgium
- Died: 26 December 1929 (aged 69)
- Occupation: poet

Albert Giraud (French: [ʒiʁo]; 23 June 1860 – 26 December 1929) was a Belgian poet who wrote in French.

== Biography ==
Giraud was born Emile Albert Kayenbergh in Leuven, Belgium. He studied law at the University of Leuven. He left university without a degree and took up journalism and poetry. In 1885, Giraud became a member of La Jeune Belgique, a Belgian nationalist literary movement that met at the Café Sésino in Brussels. Giraud became chief librarian at the Belgian Ministry of the Interior.

He was a Symbolist poet. His published works include Pierrot lunaire: Rondels bergamasques (1884), a poem cycle based on the commedia dell'arte figure of Pierrot, and La Guirlande des Dieux (1910). The composer Arnold Schönberg set a German-language version (translated by Otto Erich Hartleben) of selections from his Pierrot Lunaire to innovative atonal music. In a different, late romantic style, some of Hartleben's translations found their way into the vocal works of Joseph Marx.

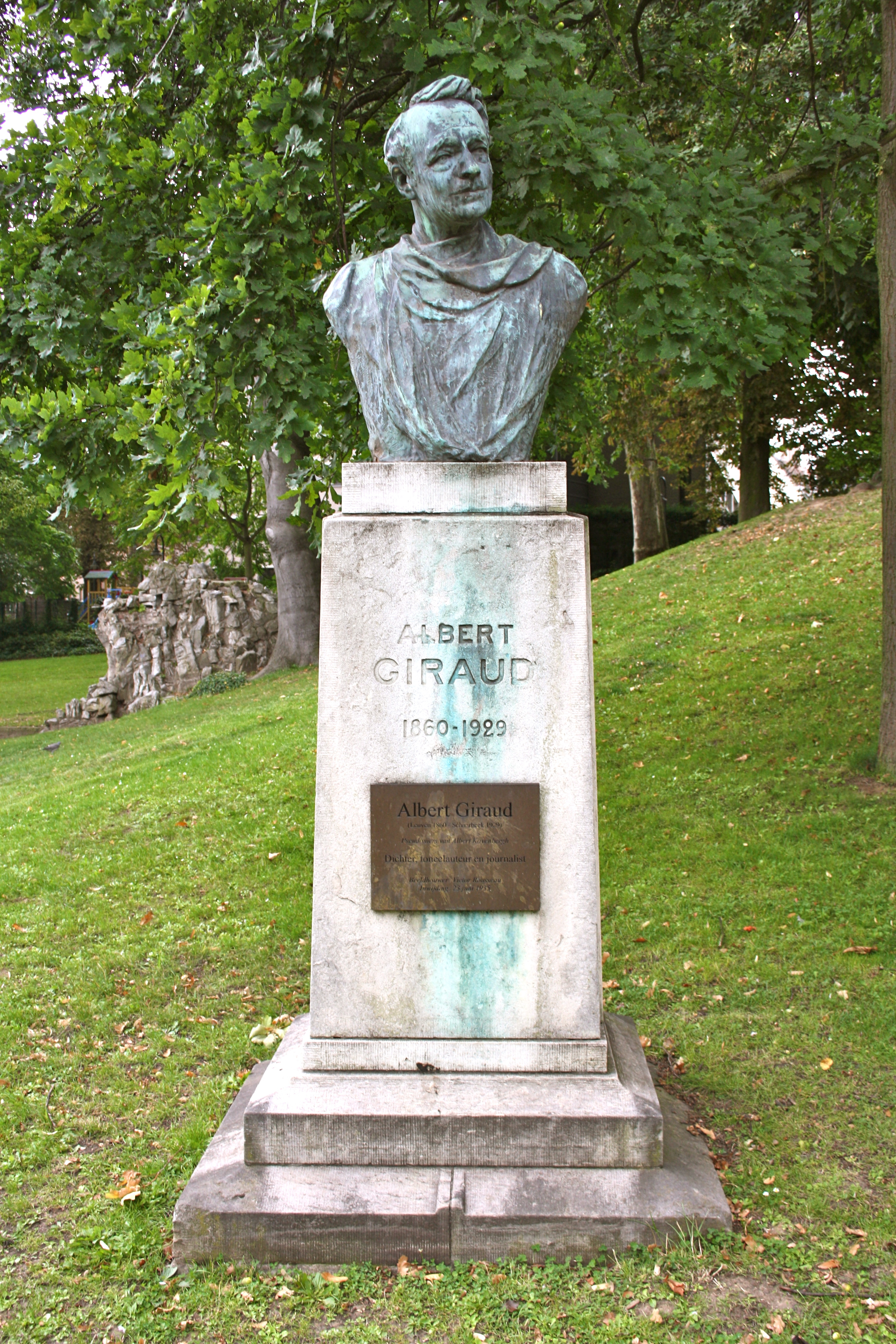
Dedicated sculpture in Leuven Sint Donatuspark

== Works ==
- Pierrot lunaire: Rondels bergamasques (1884)
- Hors du Siècle (poems written between 1885 and 1897)
- Le concert dans la musée (1921)
- Le Miroir caché (sonnets) (1921)
