= A Switchback Railway =

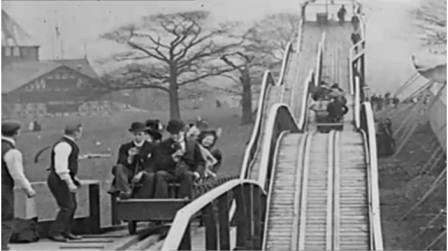
- Screenshot from the film
- Directed by: Robert W. Paul
- Produced by: Robert W. Paul
- Cinematography: Robert W. Paul
- Production company: Paul's Animatograph Works
- Release date: 1898
- Running time: 39 secs
- Country: United Kingdom
- Language: Silent

A Switchback Railway, full film (39s)

A Switchback Railway is an 1898 British short black-and-white silent actuality film, directed by Robert W. Paul, featuring patrons riding on a switchback railway at a fairground at Alexandra Palace, where Blandford Hall can be seen in the background. "This dynamically composed actuality," according to Michael Brooke of BFI Screenonline, "was clearly a success, so much so that James Williamson and the Riley Brothers released their own switchback railway films only a few months later." It is included on the BFI DVD R.W. Paul: The Collected Films 1895-1908. It is arguable that the filmmaker, R.W. Paul, missed a trick by not placing the camera inside one of the moving cars to simulate the ride from the passenger's perspective, although he might have had difficulty keeping the camera steady. Nonetheless, the film was clearly a success, so much so that James Williamson and the Riley Brothers released their own switchback railway films only a few months later.
