= Come Along, Do! =

1898 British film by Robert W. Paul

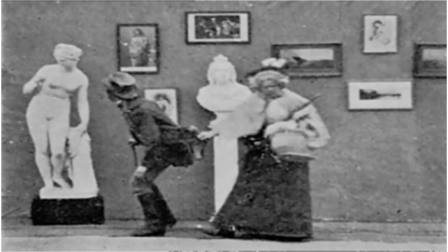
- Surviving still from the second shot of the film
- Directed by: Robert W. Paul
- Produced by: Robert W. Paul
- Production company: Paul's Animatograph Works
- Release date: 1898
- Running time: 1 minute, 38 secs surviving
- Country: United Kingdom
- Language: Silent

Come Along, Do! is an 1898 British short silent comedy film, produced and directed by Robert W. Paul. The film was of 1 minute duration, but only 38 seconds has survived. The whole of the second shot is only available as film stills.

The film features an elderly man at an art gallery who takes a great interest in a nude statue to the irritation of his wife.

The film has cinematographic significance as the first example of film continuity. It was, according to Michael Brooke of BFI Screenonline, "one of the first films to feature more than one shot." In the first shot, an elderly couple is outside an art exhibition having lunch and then follow other people inside through the door. The second shot shows what they do inside.
