= Don Juan Tenorio (film) =

- Directed by: Salvador Toscano
- Release date: November 1898
- Country: Mexico
- Language: Silent

Don Juan Tenorio is an 1898 Mexican silent drama film directed by Salvador Toscano who was Mexico's first filmmaker and is also the first film adaptation of Don Juan Tenorio a play by José Zorrilla.
