= Surrender of General Toral =

- Starring: Joseph Wheeler; William Rufus Shafter
- Cinematography: William C. Paley
- Release date: 1898
- Country: United States
- Language: Silent film

Surrender of General Toral is an 1898 film about the surrender of Spanish General José Toral y Velázquez during the Spanish–American War, which featured appearances by military leaders Joseph Wheeler and William Rufus Shafter.
