= A Nightmare =

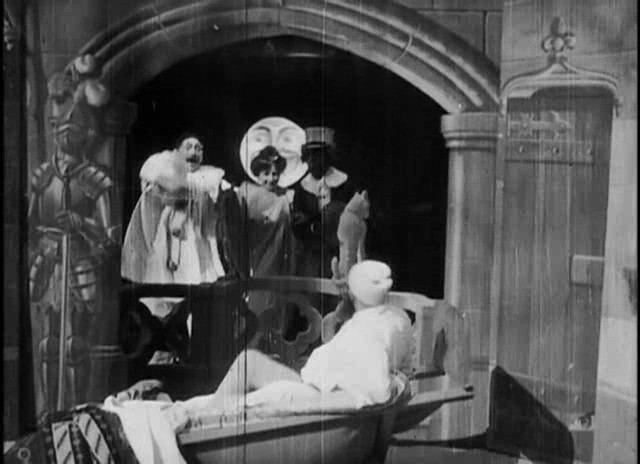
- Directed by: Georges Méliès
- Production company: Star Film Company
- Release date: 1896
- Running time: 1 min
- Country: France
- Language: Silent film

A Nightmare (French: Le cauchemar) is a silent trick film created and released in 1896 and directed by Georges Méliès. It was released by Méliès's Star Film Company and is numbered 82 in its catalogues, where it was advertised as a scène fantastique. The film was shot outside in the garden of Méliès's property in Montreuil, Seine-Saint-Denis, with painted scenery. Méliès plays the sleeping man.

== Synopsis ==
A Nightmare (1896)

A man tossing and turning in his sleep has a nightmare. He is visited by various visions which transform into each other, including a girl clad only in a sheet, a minstrel wearing blackface, Pierrot, and the Man in the Moon, who gnaws on his arm. He wakes up tangled in his sheets. He is relieved that it was all just a dream.
