= Otto Erich Hartleben =

German poet and dramatist

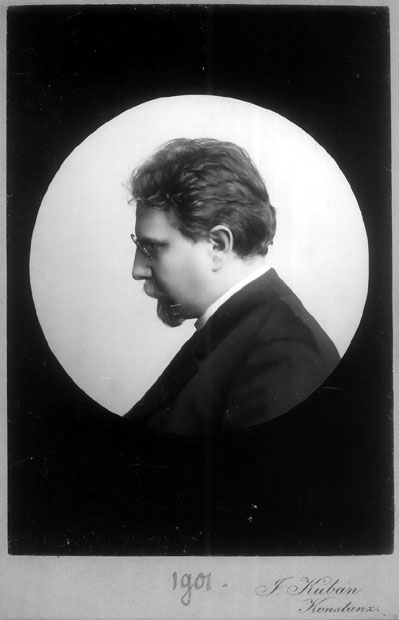
Otto Erich Hartleben.

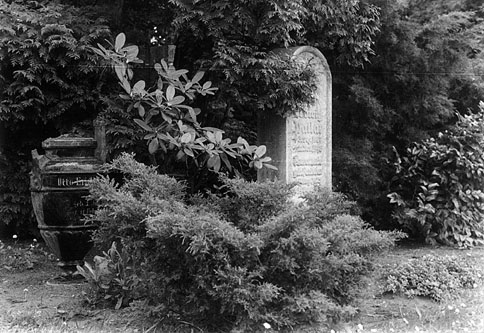
Grave.

Otto Erich Hartleben (3 June 1864 – in Clausthal; 11 February 1905 in Salò) was a German poet and dramatist from Clausthal, known for his translation of Albert Giraud's Pierrot lunaire: rondels bergamasques (later set to music in Arnold Schoenberg's melodrama Pierrot lunaire).

== Early life ==
Orphaned as a child, Hartleben was brought up by his grandfather in Hanover. Among his youthful acquaintances there were Karl Henckel, Arthur Gutheil and the future industrialist and politician Alfred Hugenberg and together they published a volume of poetry Quartett in 1886. After completing his schooling in Celle in 1886 he went to study law, first in Leipzig, where he got to know Hermann Conradi and Adolf Bartels, and later in Berlin. He studied for the civil service in Stolberg (Harz) and in Magdeburg. Giving up his legal studies, he returned to Berlin where he lived as a freelance writer, eventually moving to Munich in 1901. After the death of his grandfather in 1893, Hartleben inherited 80,000 marks and on 2 December married his lifelong companion, ex-waitress "little mop" Selma Hesse.

== Work and reception ==
In 1900 he had a resounding success with his "officer's tragedy" Rosenmontag (Carnival Monday) which deals with an ill-fated affair between a simple girl and a young officer from an old military family. He used the proceeds to purchase the Villa Halkyone in Salò on Lake Garda. Here he founded in 1903 the Halkyone Academy for the Pure Sciences, which included among its members Peter Behrens, Otto Julius Bierbaum, Franz Blei, Gerhart Hauptmann, Alfred Kubin, Emil Orlik and Ferdinand Pfohl, and which boasted just two rules: "Membership of the Halkyone Academy confers neither duties nor rights", and "everything else is governed by the spirit of the Halkyone community."

Hartleben's legendary reputation in turn-of-century letters is due chiefly to the many artistic groups he founded or contributed to, from the Bavarian Bohemian Beer Brotherhood at school in Celle (1885) to the Menschenclub (People's Club) in Magdeburg (1890), the Karlsbad Idealists' Club (1891), the Verbrechertisch (Rogues' Table) in Berlin (1896), the Berlin Naturalists' Society known as Durch (Through), the Berlin drama movement Freie Bühne (Free Stage), the Berlin Free Literary Society, the Leipzig "Auguren College", not to mention the lively interest he took in the Friedrichshagener Dichterkreis (Friedrichshagen Poets' Circle).

He also co-produced the weekly journal Die Jugend (The Youth), in which he made humorous jibes at contemporary society and its morals. One of his key characters was Serenissimus, the gone-to-seed ruler of an imaginary peppercorn principality.

He is especially noted today for his translations of other writers' poetic works, in particular of Albert Giraud's Pierrot lunaire: rondels bergamasques, selections from which were later set to music in Arnold Schoenberg's melodrama Pierrot lunaire.

== Death ==
Hartleben died in Salò, Italy.

== Works ==
- "Studententagebuch", poetry, 1886
- "Die Serényi", stories, 1887
- "Angele", comedy, 1891
- "Hanna Jagert", comedy, 1893
- "Die Geschichte vom abgerissenen Knopfe", stories, 1893
- "Ein Ehrenwort", drama, 1894
- "Meine Verse", poetry, 1895
- "Vom gastfreien Pastor", stories, 1895
- "Der römische Maler", novella, 1898
- "Ein wahrhaft guter Mensch", comedy, 1899
- "Rosenmontag”, tragedy, 1900
- "Von reifen Früchten. Meiner Verse zweiter Teil", poetry, 1902
- "Liebe kleine Mama", stories, 1904
- "Diogenes", comedy, 1905
- "Im grünen Baum zur Nachtigall", Studentenstück, 1905
- "Das Ehefest", novella, 1906
- Tagebuch 1906
- Aphorismen, edited by van den Trelde 1920

== Filmography ==
- The Serenyi, directed by Alfred Halm (1918, based on the novella Die Serényi)
- Rosenmontag, directed by Rudolf Meinert (1924, based on the play Rosenmontag)
- Love's Carnival, directed by Hans Steinhoff (1930, based on the play Rosenmontag)
- Sommerliebe, directed by Erich Engel (1942, based on the novella Die Serényi)
- Love's Carnival, directed by Willy Birgel (1955, based on the play Rosenmontag)
