= Fernand Pelez =

French painter

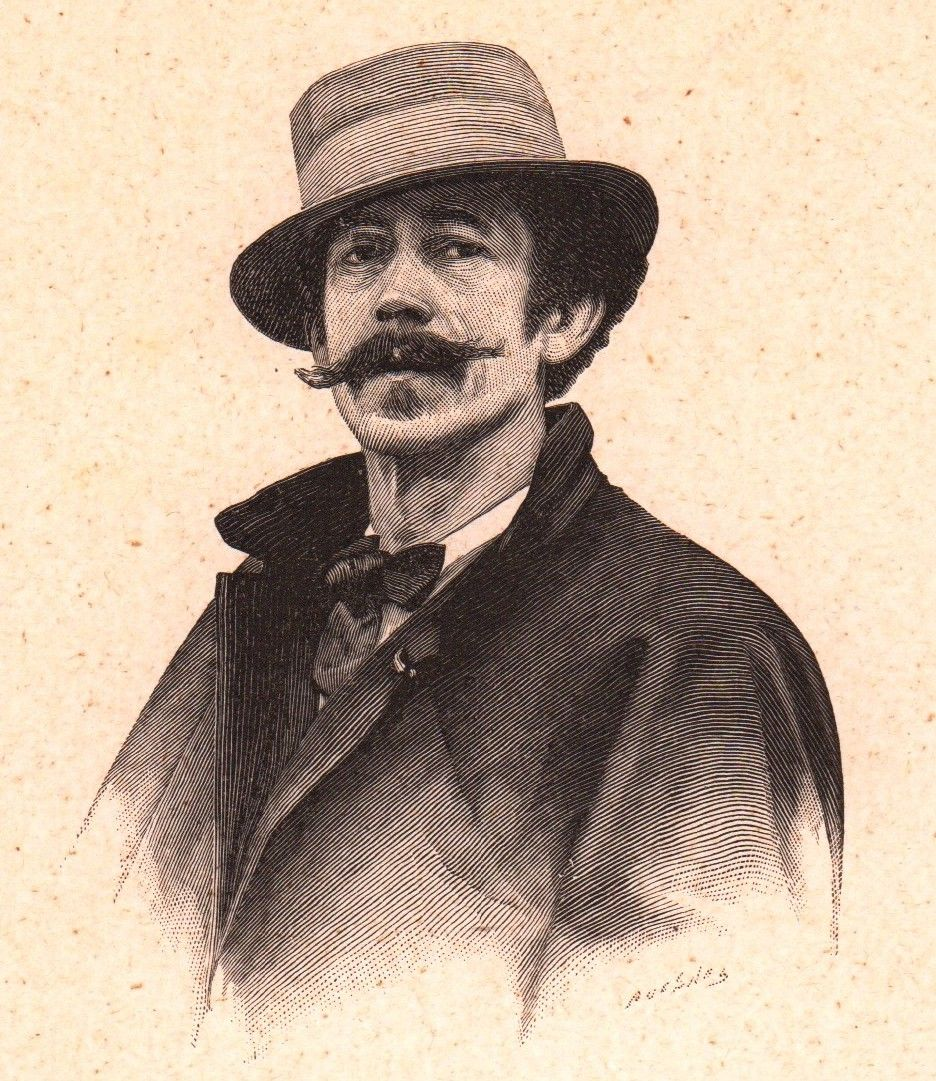
Fernand Pelez, c.1901

Fernand Pelez (January 18, 1843 – August 7, 1913) was a French painter of Spanish origin who worked in Paris. Pelez portrayed social issues in a realistic style.

== Biography ==
Pelez was born in Paris. His father, Fernand Pelez de Cordova (1820–1899), was a Parisian painter as well, and was one of his teachers.

Pelez was a commercial failure in the 1880s and, after the failure of his L'Humanité at the Salon of 1896, Pelez became something of a recluse, refusing to exhibit or sell his work.

A major exhibition of his work was mounted in Paris at the Petit Palais, Musée des Beaux-Arts de la Ville de Paris, from 24 September 2009 to 17 January 2010.

== Works ==
Among his best known works are The Mouthful of Bread and Grimaces et Misères (also known as Les Saltimbanques (1888)). Consisting of five panels and measuring together 222 cm by 625 cm (87 in by 246¼ in), the latter work is now in the Petit Palais, Paris.

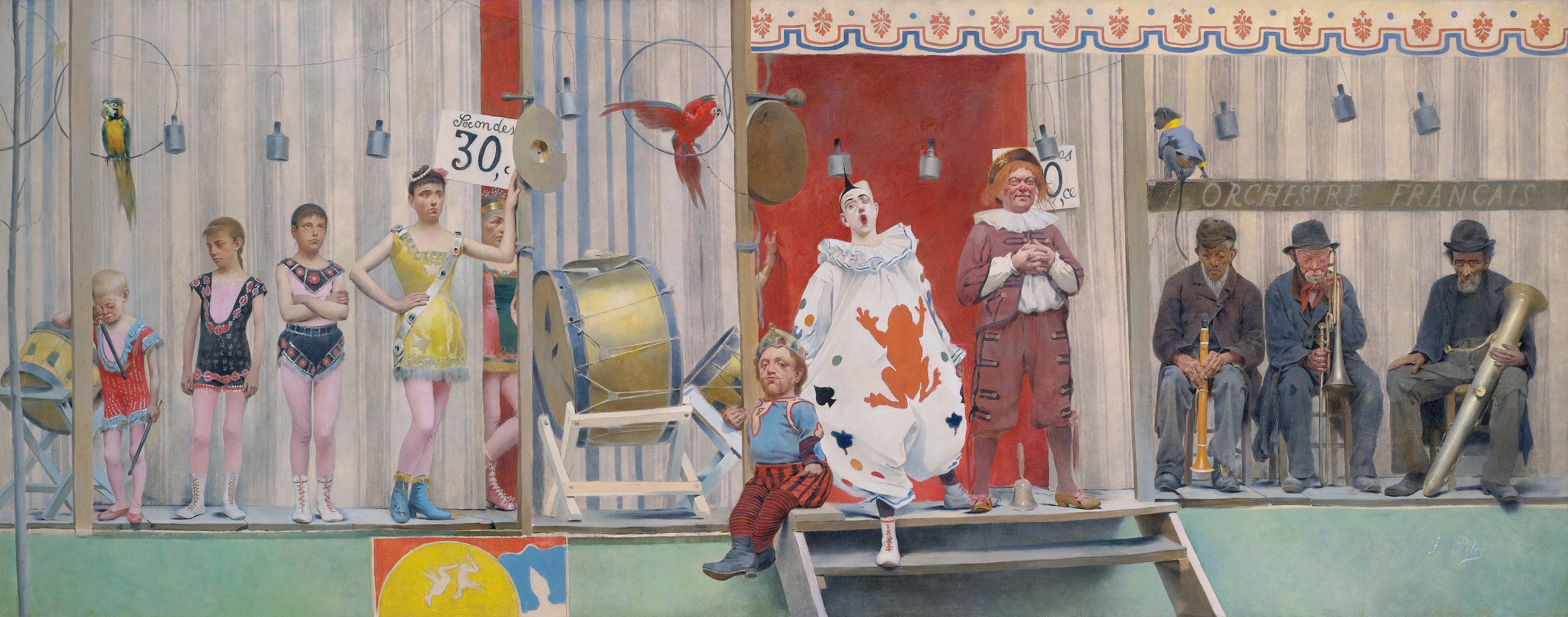
Grimaces et Misères (Les Saltimbanques), (1888)
