= The Cavalier's Dream =

1898 film

- Produced by: Vitagraph Studios
- Distributed by: Edison Studios
- Release date: 1898
- Running time: 1 minute
- Country: United States
- Language: English

The Cavalier's Dream is an 1898 American silent horror trick film. This Edison-Vitagraph short was not widely circulated in its time, but was preserved for the Library of Congress in 1958. In 2017, the Library scanned the 16mm film and the 2K file was published on the Internet Archive.

According to Charles Musser, the film was "likely shot (in September or October) by Albert E. Smith and J. Stuart Blackton in the Manhattan rooftop studio of their new American Vitagraph company, then an Edison licensee." The work is sometimes mistakenly credited to director Edwin S. Porter. But Porter made his earliest films for the Edison studio in 1901.

== Plot ==
The catalog Edison Films (1903) described the cavalier's dream narrative. "He sits asleep at a bare table; an old witch enters, raps three times, then disappears; the cavalier sees the table spread for a sumptuous repast. Mephistopheles appears, then the old witch, who suddenly changes (or we might say now shapeshifts) to a beautiful young girl." By the end of the film, the cavalier is surrounded by a dancing ring of five hooded figures (the witch plus four newly materialized with white shrouds), all urged on by Mephistopheles. All vanish in the final moment, as the cavalier wakes from his dream. "The changes and magical appearances are startling and instantaneous."

The Library of Congress catalog for its Paper Print Collection offers a synopsis that identifies the characters differently. “The subject of this film is the purported dream of a man dressed as a cavalier in knee breeches. He is first seen with his head on his arm as if asleep. The surrounding set represents a baronial hall. By the use of stop action photography, food and table decorations appear and disappear, as well as many different types of people, such as the devil, the spectre of death, persons in ecclesiastical costumes, and some young women." (This reference to multiple women seems a simple error.) "As the film ends, the room where the cavalier is asleep is filled with these individuals, all of whom disappear, leaving him as he was, with his head on his arm, apparently asleep.” Michael Grutch (a.k.a. popegrutch) of the Century Film Project website and blog interprets the work as part of the horror genre.

== Production and reproduction ==
In 1897, theatrical entertainers Blackton and Smith incorporated an Edison motion-picture projector into their "Edison Vitagraph" stage act. By year's end, they converted the machine into a movie camera, and by 1898 were shooting actualities, comedies, advertisements, and trick films. After Thomas Edison brought suit against the company for copyright and patent infringement, the American Vitagraph Company paid to license their cameras and supplied their productions to Edison. Hence, the copyright for The Cavalier's Dream went to Thomas A. Edison, whose company distributed it.

As had recently become standard practice, Edison's company used the 35mm film negative to print each frame onto rolls of photographic paper, also 35mm wide. Two copies of the paper prints were deposited with the U.S. Copyright Office as legal proof of rights ownership. The Cavalier's Dream was not a well-known film and was seldom written about. However, when the Library of Congress and the Academy of Motion Pictures began to preserve the Paper Print Collection by re-photographing each frame on film, the little-known Vitagraph production was one of some three thousand other motion pictures preserved as 16mm film prints. Kemp Niver and Bill Ault did the copying from 1953 to 1968, with The Cavalier's Dream getting this treatment in 1954. The digital video accessible since 2017 derived from the Library of Congress scan of its 16mm print.

An excerpt from the Edison-Vitagraph production appears at the beginning, middle, and end of Bill Morrison (director)'s experimental narrative, The Film of Her (1996, 12 minutes). Without having seen the movie, Morrison purchased a 16mm copy from the Library, based on the Dream title. In the fictionalized narrative about the rediscovery of the Paper Print Collection in 1942 is framed as a copyright clerks's dream of finding a short film with a woman he saw in his youth. The Morrison rendering uses the sleeping-waking cavalier, in slow motion, as its penultimate image. Music by composer Henryk Górecki, "Three Pieces In Olden Style” plays over the finale; guitar music by Bill Frisell (“The Way Home”) is heard with the cavalier footage at the beginning of The Film of Her.

In 2025, composer Anping Chen (NYU Screen Scoring Program) recorded his original score for The Cavalier's Dream. This version of the movie premiered at the Bill Morrison retrospective, held at the Nickelodeon Theater in Columbia, South Carolina, March 30–31, 2025.
