= The Nearsighted School Teacher =

1898 short silent film

- Starring: Augusta Selmer
- Cinematography: G. W. Bitzer
- Release date: 1898
- Country: United States
- Language: Silent film

The Nearsighted School Teacher was an early short comedy film released in 1898. It stars Augusta Selmer as a young lady.

== Plot ==
In this case it is the schoolmaster who comes to grief. He is seated at this desk busily engrossed in private business and letting his students run riot. One of the youngsters causes great merriment by tying an artificial spider to a ruler, and shaking it in front of the schoolmaster's face.
