= L'Imitation de Notre-Dame la Lune =

Collection of poems by Jules Laforgue

L'Imitation de Notre-Dame la Lune (The Imitation of Our Lady the Moon) (1886) is a collection of poems by the French poet Jules Laforgue. It is dedicated to Gustave Kahn and "to the memory of little Salammbô, priestess of Tanit". It contains the following twenty-two poems:

- "Un mot au Soleil pour commencer"
- "Litanies des premiers quartiers de la lune"
- "Au large"
- "Clair de lune"
- "Climat, faune et flore de la lune"
- "Guitare"
- "Pierrots"
- "Pierrots (On a des principes)"
- "Pierrots (Scène courte mais typique)"
- "Locutions des Pierrots"
- "Dialogue avant le lever de la lune"
- "Lunes en détresse"
- "Petits mystères"
- "Nuitamment"
- "États"
- "La lune est stérile"
- "Stérilités"
- "Les linges, le cygne"
- "Nobles et touchantes divagations sous la lune"
- "Jeux"
- "Litanies des derniers quartiers de la lune"
- "Avis, je vous prie"

== English translations ==
Selections from L'Imitation have been translated by William Jay Smith and Graham Dunstan Martin, and in its entirety by Peter Dale.
