= Jules Laforgue =

Franco-Uruguayan poet

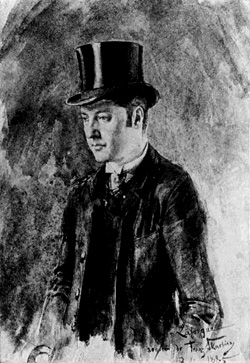
- Portrait by Franz Skarbina (1885)
- Born: 16 August 1860; Montevideo, Uruguay
- Died: 20 August 1887 (aged 27); Paris, France

Jules Laforgue (French: [ʒyl lafɔʁɡ]; 16 August 1860 – 20 August 1887) was a Franco-Uruguayan poet, often referred to as a Symbolist poet. Critics and commentators have also pointed to Impressionism as a direct influence and his poetry has been called "part-symbolist, part-impressionist". Laforgue was a model for Pierre-Auguste Renoir, including for Renoir's 1881 painting Luncheon of the Boating Party.

== Life ==
His parents, Charles-Benoît Laforgue and Pauline Lacollay, met in Uruguay where his father worked first as a teacher and then a bank employee. Jules was the second of eleven children in the family, the eldest child being Jules' brother Émile, who was to become a sculptor of note. In 1866 the family moved back to France, to Tarbes, his father's hometown, but in 1867 Jules' father and mother chose to return to Uruguay, taking along their nine younger children, leaving Jules and his older brother Émile in Tarbes to be raised with a cousin's family.

In 1876 Jules's father took the family to Paris. In 1877 his mother died of pneumonia, three months after a miscarriage, and Jules, never a good student, failed his baccalaureate exams. (His classmate Henri Bergson passed, and went on to great intellectual achievement as a philosopher.) He failed again in 1878, and then a third time, but on his own began to read the great French authors and visit the museums of Paris.

In 1879 his father became sick and returned to Tarbes, but Jules stayed behind in Paris. He published his first poem in Toulouse. By the end of the year, he had published several poems and was noticed by well-known authors. In 1880 he moved in the literary circles of the capital and became a protégé of Paul Bourget, the editor of the review La Vie moderne.

Much happened to Laforgue in 1881: he attended a course of Taine's lectures and developed a great interest in painting and art. Charles Ephrussi, a rich collector, one of the first collectors of Impressionist art, took Laforgue on as his secretary. The direct influence of Impressionism on Laforgue's early development as a poet is a topic in Laforgue studies. In his introduction to his edition of Les Complaintes, Michael Collie, author of a biography of Laforgue (Laforgue (1963)), states that he sees a more or less conscious attempt on Laforgue's part to produce a literary equivalent of Impressionism. In 1881 Laforgue wrote a novel, Stephane Vassiliew and prepared a collection of poems titled The Tears of the Earth, which he later abandoned, though some pieces were altered for Les Complaintes. Also in 1881 his sister left him alone in Paris to tend to their father who was seriously ill in Tarbes. Around that time, he also began to frequent Le Chat Noir and adopted the style of fumisterie (smoke screening). The origins of this can be found in Willette's panel cartoon, launched in the Parisian cabaret, which centered on a clown called "Pierrot fumiste" and exerted significant influence on Laforgue. When his father died, Laforgue did not attend the funeral.

From November 1881 until 1886, he lived in Berlin, working as the French reader for the Empress Augusta, a sort of cultural counselor. He was well paid and could pursue his interests very freely. In 1885, he wrote L'Imitation de Notre-Dame la Lune, widely regarded as his masterpiece.

In 1886, he returned to France and married Leah Lee, an Englishwoman. That year, his poetry was published in La Vogue alongside the work of Arthur Rimbaud. His poem "L'Hiver Qui Vient" ("The Coming Winter") was one of these poems, which he believed set the tone for his work to come. While he was able to publish some experimental writings there, his most creative and original work, at least as he saw it, was not published during his lifetime. He died the next year of tuberculosis, four days after his 27th birthday, his wife following him shortly thereafter. When he died, he left an unfinished book of free verse, Des Fleurs de Bonne Volonté, and an unfinished final essay for his series, Moral Tales.

Influenced by Walt Whitman, Laforgue was one of the first French poets to write in free verse. In fact, his translations of Whitman's poetry, which were published by La Vogue, are believed to have influenced Laforgue's compatriot Gustave Kahn. Philosophically, he was pessimist and an ardent disciple of Schopenhauer and Von Hartmann. His poetry would be one of the major influences on Ezra Pound and the young T. S. Eliot (cf. Prufrock and other observations). Louis Untermeyer wrote, "Prufrock, published in 1917, was immediately hailed as a new manner in English literature and belittled as an echo of Laforgue and the French symbolists to whom Eliot was indebted."

== Works ==
- Soir de Carnaval (ca. 1880)
- Stéphane Vassiliew (1881, not published until 1943)
- Les Complaintes (1885)
- L'Imitation de Notre-Dame la Lune (1886)
- Moralités légendaires (1887)
- Des Fleurs de bonne volonté (1890)
- Derniers vers (1890)
- Berlin, la cour et la ville (1922)
- Triste triste (1967)
- Some Poems of Jules Laforgue With Images by Patrick Caulfield (London: Petersburg Press, 1973).
