= Jean Pezous =

French painter (1815–1885)

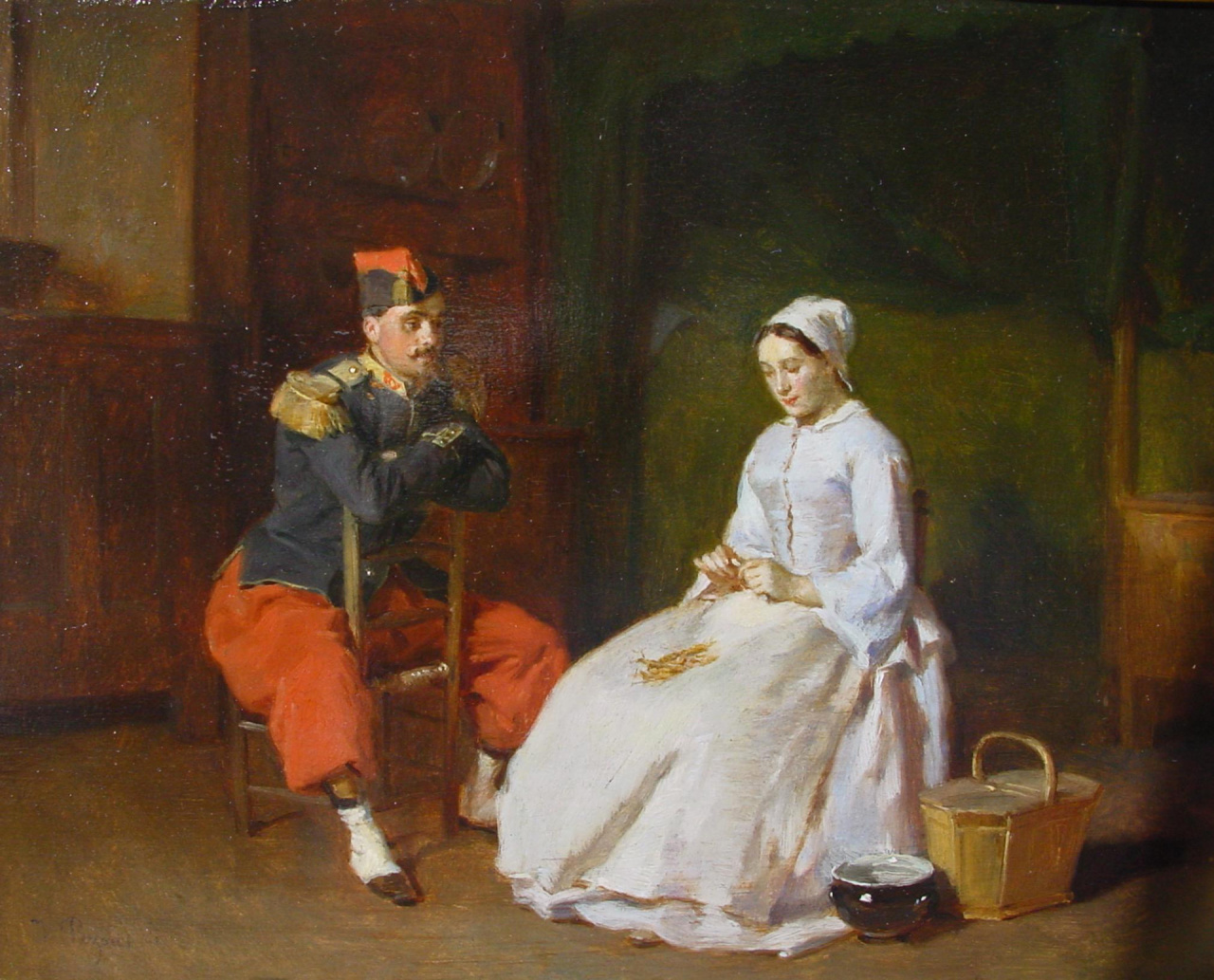
Romance

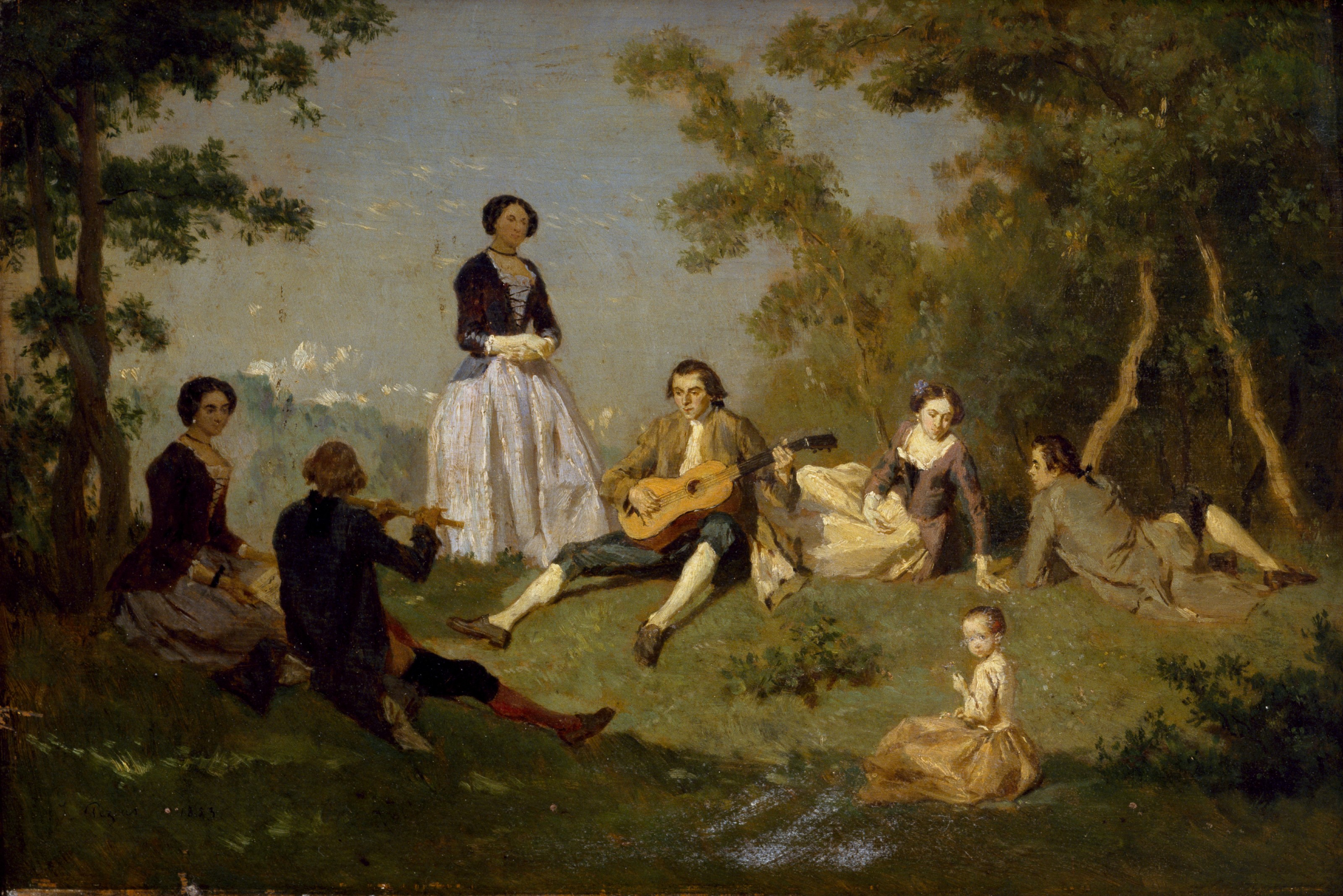
A Picnic Scene

Jean Pezous (6 March 1815, Toulon - 18 April 1885, Paris) was a French painter known primarily for genre scenes; many depicting group activities. Until 1875, he also created some history paintings, but they have all disappeared. Although he is believed to have painted numerous portraits, the only one known to be his is that of the mime, Charles Deburau.

== Biography ==
He came from a family of modest means. In 1830, he was enrolled at the drawing school of Toulon, directed by Bernard Sénéquier. Later, he worked in the studios of the Marquis de Clinchamp (1787-1880), a church painter, and was also influenced by Pierre Letuaire, a noted Provençal artist. After two stays in Paris, he returned to his family in 1835, during a cholera outbreak. He went back to Paris after his parents had died, and enrolled at the École Nationale Supérieure des Beaux-Arts.

He collaborated with Victor Orsel in creating decorations for the church of Notre-Dame de-Lorette, together with his fellow students, Alphonse Périn and Gabriel Tyr. His debut at the Salon came in 1846 with "Le Jeu de boule" (The Ball Game), which received an honorable mention. After that, he painted landscapes.

During the French Revolution of 1848, he turned from painting to participate in the reclamation of swampland in Sologne. Upon returning to Paris in 1850, he exhibited his tableau, "La Salle de police" (The Police Station) at the Salon and attracted the attention of the future Napoléon III; securing his fame. He received several commissions for decorative work and began exhibiting outside the capital, notably at Orléans in 1859.

After 1865, his sales and his health declined, creating serious financial difficulties. At the outbreak of the Franco-Prussian War, he went to Boulogne, returning in 1871, after the Paris Commune. Luckily, he found that his home and studio had not been looted.

From 1878 to 1884, he lived in Bondy. When he went back to Paris, he began to paint in the style of Corot but died, destitute, before he was able to restart his career.

His works may be seen at the Musée Comtadin-Duplessis, Musée Carnavalet and the Musée d'Art de Toulon.

== Sources ==
- Étienne-Antoine Parrocel, Annales de la peinture, Ch. Albessard et Bérard, 1862 Online
- André Alauzen and Laurent Noet, Dictionnaire des peintres et sculpteurs de Provence-Alpes-Côte d'Azur, Éditions Jeanne Laffitte, 2006 ISBN 978-2-86276-441-2
- Jean-Roger Soubiran, André Alauzen, André Bourde et al., La peinture en Provence dans les collections du musée de Toulon du XVIIe au début du XXe siècle, Musée de Toulon, 1985 ISBN 2-905076-09-7
