= Charles Bridault =

French playwright

Charles Bridault (Paris, 1830 – 1896) was a 19th-century French playwright. His plays were given on the most significant Parisian stages of his time including the Théâtre des Folies-Nouvelles, and the Théâtre Saint-Germain.

== Personal life ==
A General Secretary of the Théâtre de l'Odéon, then journalist by Le Figaro, he became managing director of the théâtre Tour-d'Auvergne from 1871.

== Works ==
- 1853: Mort et remords ou les inconvénients d'assassiner un marchand d'habits grêlé, with Paul Legrand
- 1854: Les Succès de l'année, rondeau
- 1854: Pierrot Dandin, pantomime in five tableaux
- 1855: La Fausse douairière, pantomime in two tableaux, with Legrand
- 1855: Les Jolis chasseurs, hallali musical
- 1856: Le quinze novembre, with Henri Larochelle
- 1857: La Naïade, ballet-pantomime in two acts, mingled with songs
- 1857: Nella, ballet-pantomime mingled with choirs
- 1858: Fra Diavolino, operetta in one act, with Amédée de Jallais
- 1858: La Recherche de l'inconnu, operetta in one act, with Sylvain Mangeant
- 1858: Le Roi de la gaudriole, operetta in one act, with de Jallais and Alexandre Flan
- 1859: Monsieur Deschalumeaux, opéra-bouffon (after Auguste***), arranged in two tableaux
- 1861: Je suis né coiffé, folie vaudeville in one act, with Édouard Montagne
- 1864: Un Maestro de bourgade, opera comique in one act
- 1866: L'Echappé de province, play in three acts, mingled with song
- 1867: Point d'Angleterre, comedy in one act, with Paul Siraudin
- 1874: Ah! C'est donc toi MMe la Revue !, revue in three acts and ten tableaux, with Hector Monreal and Henry Blondeau

== Bibliography ==
- Émile Abraham, Les acteurs et les actrices de Paris: biographie complète, 1861, (p. 101)
- Jean Valmy-Baysse, La curieuse aventure des boulevards extérieurs (1786-1950), 1950, (p. 320)
