= Charles Deburau =

French mime artist (1829–1873)

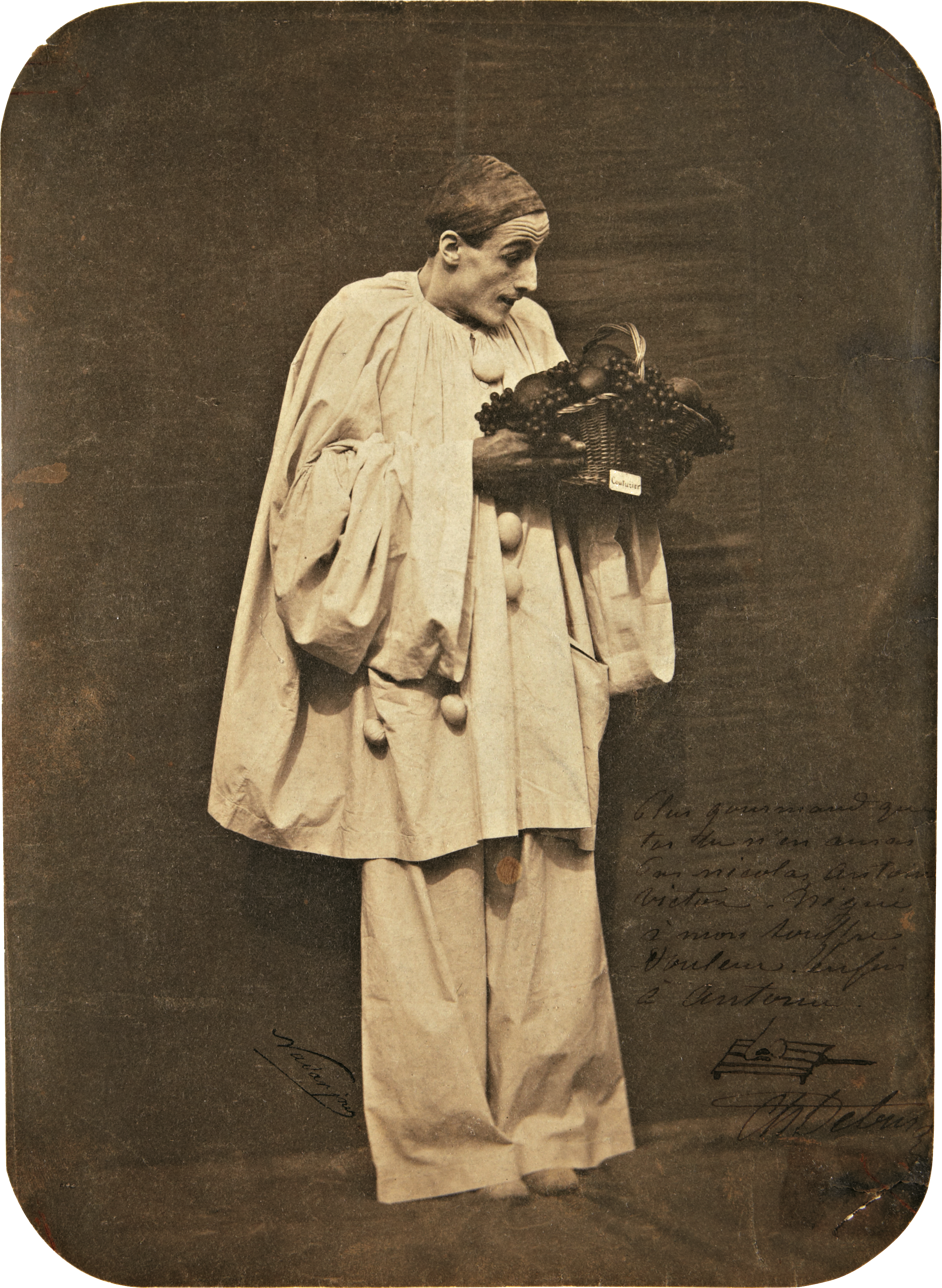
Nadar: Charles Deburau as Pierrot, c. 1855

Jean-Charles Deburau (French pronunciation: [ʒɑ̃ ʃaʁl dəbyʁo]; 15 February 1829 – 19 December 1873) was an important French mime, the son and successor of the legendary Jean-Gaspard Deburau, who was immortalized as Baptiste the Pierrot in Marcel Carné's film Children of Paradise (1945). After his father's death in 1846, Charles kept alive his pantomimic legacy, first in Paris, at the Théâtre des Funambules, and then, beginning in the late 1850s, at theaters in Bordeaux and Marseille. He is routinely credited with founding a southern "school" of pantomime; indeed, he served as tutor to the Marseille mime Louis Rouffe, who, in turn, gave instruction to Séverin Cafferra, known simply as "Séverin". But their art was nourished by the work of other mimes, particularly of Charles's rival, Paul Legrand, and by earlier developments in nineteenth-century pantomime that were alien to the Deburaux' traditions.

== Life and career ==
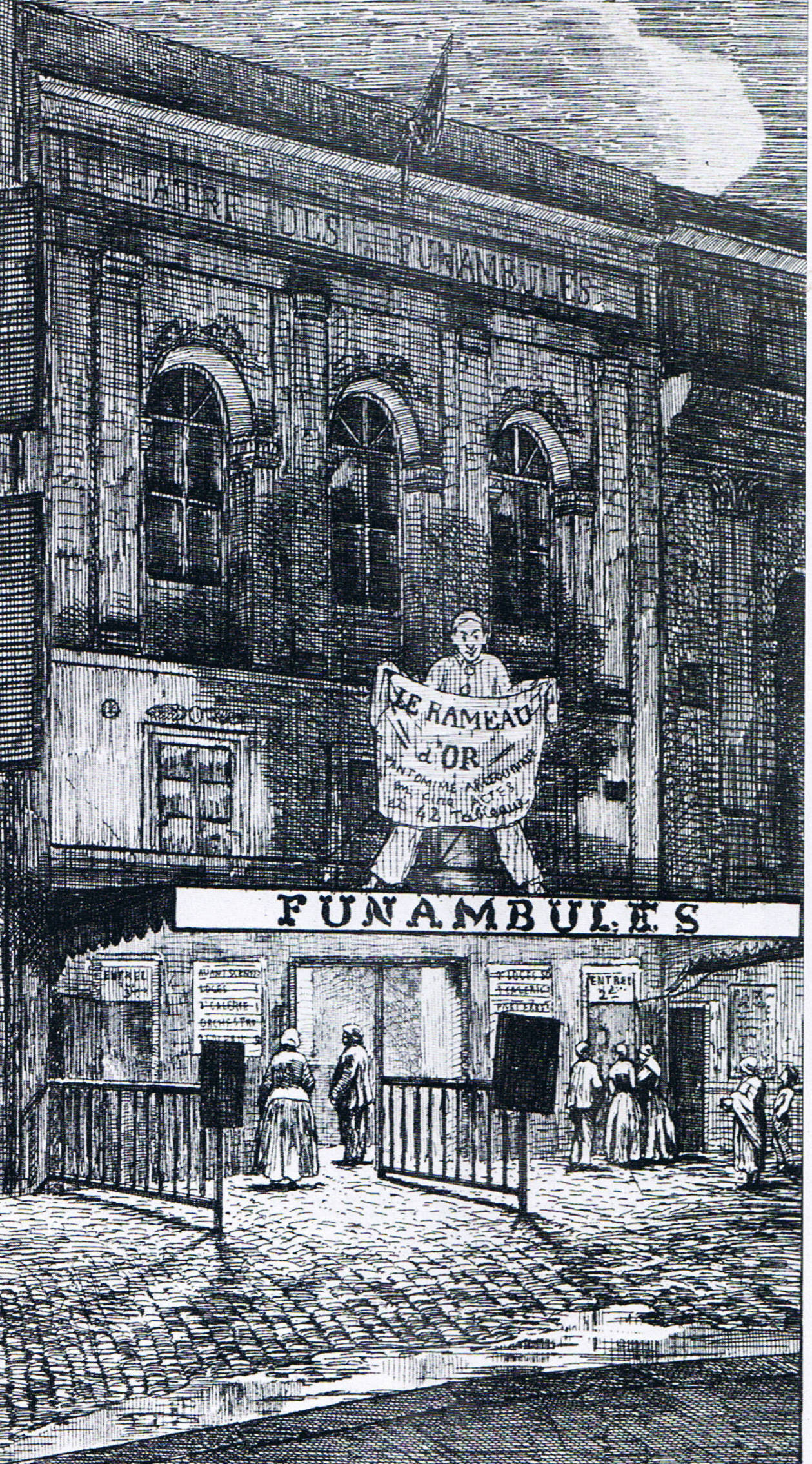
The Théâtre des Funambules in its last year on the Boulevard du Temple. Deburau stars in The Golden Bough, 1862.

Deburau père, feeling burdened by the hardships of the performer, discouraged Charles's taking a professional interest in the theater. He apprenticed him, when he reached maturity, first to a clock-maker, then to a firm that specialized in painting on porcelain. Charles was indifferent to both professions. When Jean-Gaspard died, the director of the Funambules, Charles-Louis Billion, offered Charles his father's role, Pierrot, and, after tentative experiments in minor parts, he made his formal début in November 1847. That début was in The Three Planets, or The Life of a Rose, a "grand pantomime-harlequinade-fairy play" in the old style of his father's day, with feuding supernatural agents, magic talismans, energetic mayhem, and Harlequin's triumphant conquest of Columbine.

Unfortunately, his début came at a time when another Pierrot at the Funambules, Paul Legrand, was just beginning to make a reputation for himself; Charles had been conscripted as his replacement, in fact, while Legrand fulfilled an engagement at the Adelphi in London. When he returned, he and Charles fell into a rivalry, which persisted until Legrand left the theater in 1853. Two years later, Charles accepted an engagement at the Délassements-Comiques, and he was not to return to the Funambules until 1862, when he appeared in its last two pantomimes, The Golden Bough and Pierrot's Memoirs, before the theater was demolished, a casualty of Haussmann's renovation of Paris.

Charles did not prosper in the capital. According to Paul Hugounet, a contemporary of the mime and one of his earliest biographers, he left the Délassements-Comiques only a year after his engagement, a lawsuit pending between him and its director. In the following year, 1858, he opened the Salle Lacaze as the Théâtre Deburau, but the venture was a failure, and in 1859, to recover his debts, he left Paris on a tour of the provinces. His last major attempt to win over audiences at the capital was in 1865, when he signed on at the Fantaisies-Parisiennes, then co-administered by the novelist and enthusiast of pantomime, Champfleury. Champfleury wrote his last pantomime, The Pantomime of the Attorney, for Deburau's début, and, though it was praised by the likes of Théophile Gautier, Charles's engagement was cancelled not four months after its premiere. "The less-than-tepid reception till then accorded the pantomime", in the words of L.-Henry Lecomte, the chief historian of the theater, "convinced the administration of the Fantaisies-Parisiennes to abandon the genre at about this time".

It was abroad—notably in Egypt for ten months (1860–61)—and in the provinces that Charles found admiring audiences. The Alcazar theaters in Bordeaux and Marseille were especially welcoming. He spent two years at the former after his Egyptian tour and assumed its directorship in 1870. From 1867 to 1869, he played at the Alcazar in Marseille, and it was there that a young disciple of Pierrot, Louis Rouffe, first saw him perform, and was enchanted. Rouffe, who had begun performing—first in comedy, then in pantomime—at the age of seventeen, was remarked by Charles as a burgeoning talent, and when Charles, sensing his own early death, accepted the directorship of the Alcazar du Quartier de La Bastide in Bordeaux, he summoned Rouffe to his side as his understudy. There Rouffe performed for one season after Charles's death in 1873; then he returned to Marseille, where he found loyal audiences for the next ten years before tuberculosis cut his own life short. With his success and subsequent tutelage of younger mimes was born the southern "school" of pantomime.

Charles had always wished to be more than a performer. According to Hugounet, he dreamed of becoming a Professor of Mime at the Paris Conservatory or Opéra. But he died too young to realize either of those ambitions.

== Pantomime ==
It was inevitable that, as a mime, he should be compared to his father. Gautier seemed to sum up the general consensus when he wrote, in 1858, that "the son recalls the father...but without servile imitation":

The mask is the same in appearance, as it should be for a traditional character; yet a wholly original wit sends the grimaces wrinkling across it. Deburau is young, thin, elegant; his features are delicate and distinct, his eyes expressive—and his little mouth, which he knows how to distend to swallow the bigger morsels, has a kind of jeering disdain, an English "sneer", that is very piquant. A clown's agility animates this slender body, with its delicate limbs, on which the white blouse with its big buttons floats freely; he moves with ease, suppleness, and grace, marking without stressing the rhythm of the music....

His technique was universally praised, usually by unflattering reference to that of his rival, Legrand. In an article in Le Figaro of 1855, William Busnach was blunt in his assessment, calling Legrand, "as a mime, inferior to Debureau [sic] fils." Gautier was more tactful, but the criticism was the same: "Deburau has the sharper mask, the cleaner technique, the livelier leg." Why then did Charles fail to find audiences in Paris? The answer seems to lie in the reasons for Legrand's success there. Legrand created a Pierrot wholly different from that of either of the Deburaux, père or fils. To the critic Taxïle Delord, writing in Le Charivari, Legrand's Pierrot seemed fashionably (if deplorably) "modern". "The old pantomime no longer exists", he declared; "now we have a...neo-Pierrotism, if such an expression is permissible":

Pierrot is not content to rouse laughter: he also calls forth tears: the times demand it, we have become extremely sensitive, we want Pierrot to have an old mother, a sweet fiancée, a sister to rescue from the snares of a seducer. The egoistic, lazy, gluttonous, cowardly Pierrot of old offends the exquisite delicacy of the younger generations: they must have a Pierrot-Montyon.

They find him, he wrote, in Legrand, and, through his Pierrot, "[t]he great marriage of the sublime and the grotesque of which Romanticism dreamed has now been realized....". For at Legrand's theater, the Folies-Nouvelles, "[o]ne oscillates by turns between sadness and joy; peals of laughter break from every breast; gentle tears moisten every barley-sugar stick."

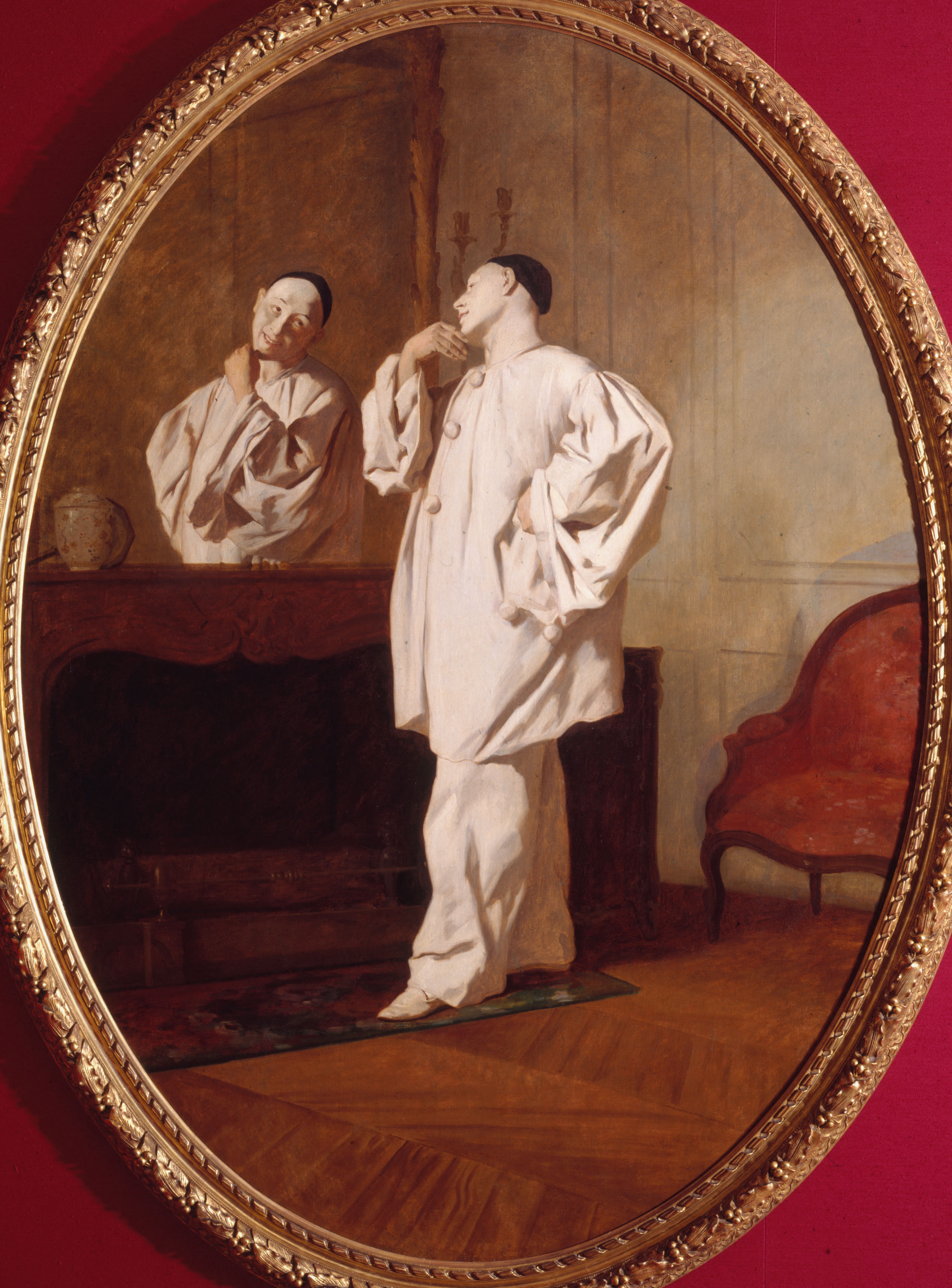
Portrait of Deburau by Jean Pezous

Charles's pantomime was, by contrast, old-fashioned: he apparently had no desire to part with his father's conception of Pierrot. Unfortunately, once he left the Théâtre des Funambules, he did not have the resources to sustain public interest in the figure. The stage of the Funambules had been designed expressly for what Champfleury called "the largest and grandest" (and also the most popular) of the pantomimes in Jean-Gaspard's repertoire: the "pantomime-fairy play". It had three traps, "neither more nor less than that of the Opéra", as Théodore de Banville wrote in his Souvenirs, "an arrangement that permitted the changes of scene, the transformations, the perpetual variety of a vision ceaselessly metamorphosed for the pleasure of the eyes and to the heart's content". The spectacular piece with which Charles débuted there had been set in such a fairyland: The Three Planets, or The Life of a Rose was, as noted above, a "grand pantomime-harlequinade-fairy play" that was "in three parts and twelve changes of scene, mixed with dances, transformations, and sumptuous costumes". A glance into the volume of pantomimes that Emile Goby published in 1889, Pantomimes de Gaspard et Ch. Deburau, turns up nothing so ambitious as this. Instead, one finds what Adriane Despot concluded were the usual sorts of productions on Jean-Gaspard's stage: "light, small-scale, nonsensical adventures enlivened with comic dances, ridiculous battles, and confrontations placed in a domestic or otherwise commonplace setting." But what the Goby collection represents is not so much Jean-Gaspard's pantomimes as Charles's own (or sometimes Charles's versions of the former). As Champfleury notes in his preface to the volume, it reproduces only "a repertoire easy to perform in the course of many peregrinations through the provinces". The mature Jean-Gaspard never played in the provinces; Charles sought work frequently there. To secure that work, he had to travel light, and to make do with the theaters that were offered him. And there were few opportunities for spectacular effects, even if he could have exploited them, on the French stages outside Paris.

As a consequence, he watered down a repertoire that was already overly familiar, at least to Parisian audiences (to the provincials, he was a welcome, even marvelous, diversion). He also, as a consequence, thrust himself into dramatic territory for which his talents were not altogether suited. Typical of his post-Funambules pantomimes is Champfleury's Pantomime of the Attorney, which appears as the last piece in the Goby collection. Here we are in that "commonplace setting", an attorney's office, that Despot describes above, confronting a "light, small-scale" adventure. Pierrot is the clerk of Cassander, an attorney, and is in love with Columbine, the office assistant. Since Cassander is away for most of the piece, the lovers can indulge their appetites, and the pantomime turns out to be little more than a vehicle for comically arch and sweet amorous dalliance. It is, in fact, an ideal vehicle for the mime for whom Champfleury wrote his first pantomimes, Paul Legrand.

For if Charles consistently outdid his rival in cleanness of technique and liveliness of leg, Legrand took all the honors when it came to sentimental comedy. Charles's mask was "sharp", but Legrand's art, wrote Gautier, was "more consummate, more extensive, more varied". When, rarely, their Pierrots were paired together, as they were twice in their early Funambules years, Charles played the "funny" or "clever" Pierrot, Paul the Pierrot of sincerity and feeling, who evoked not just laughter but tears. The Pantomime of the Attorney seems to have been written with the latter Pierrot in mind.

== Specimen pantomime: The Whale ==
[Scene: A spot on the seashore.] HARLEQUIN and COLUMBINE come running in; CASSANDER and PIERROT will follow.

Harlequin wants to kiss his fiancée; she spurns him. "After our marriage", she says. Harlequin: "Oh, well. Give me your corsage flower." She refuses: "After our marriage ...". He pursues her ...

Cassander and Pierrot enter. Immediately Cassander trips, goes sprawling. He is picked up.

Pierrot is burdened with a large frying pan, a basket full of eggs, a bundle of sticks, and a fishing rod. He is jealous of Harlequin, to whom Cassander wants to give his daughter. Without Harlequin's seeing him do it, he annoys him with his fishing line. Thinking Cassander is to blame, Harlequin punches the old man, knocking him to the ground. Columbine, indignant, slaps Harlequin's face. Pierrot, after having helped Cassander up, tries to goad Harlequin into a fight. The latter refuses. "I don't fight with a valet", he says. And to calm Cassander, he gives him an enormous watch. Cassander softens, and shushes Pierrot, who wants to swoop down on his rival. In the midst of this brawl, Cassander receives the blows of the two combatants. Columbine, to calm Pierrot, whom she loves, gives him her flower without being seen by Harlequin.

"Come, let's eat", says Cassander.

Pierrot responds: "I'm going to catch you a nice fish, and I've got everything here to cook it with." He shows off the eggs in the basket; he takes up his rod. Good heavens: there's no bait. He spots a fly on Cassander's nose. "Just what I need", he says. "Don't move." He traps the fly, but a stream of blood gushes from Cassander's nostrils. Columbine goes to the old man's aid. Cassander wants to strike Pierrot, but the latter, who has already thrown out his line, tells him: "Stay back; they're biting." Then he says to Columbine: "Pick up your mandolin and play us a tune; that attracts the fish."

Harlequin, to ingratiate himself with Columbine, starts to dance. Pierrot delightedly sees his line drawn under the water. "I've got one, it's taken the bait!".

At that instant, a huge whale breaks the surface. Terrified, it utters a frightful cry. Cassander wakes up; Columbine and Harlequin stop what they are doing; everyone is on the point of running away. Pierrot shouts for help.

At that moment, the whale opens its enormous mouth, pulls on the line, and Pierrot is drawn plunging into the animal's belly. Cassander, Harlequin, and Columbine run off in terror.

The whale grows visibly larger, taking up the entire stage. Little by little, the side facing the audience disappears, revealing the interior of the monster, Pierrot within, having fainted away. The whale thrashes with intestinal convulsions, and its jolts end by drawing Pierrot from his stupor.

"Where am I?. I can't see clearly ... Ah!". He takes some matches from his basket and lights a candle. "What a weird room! But it's warm: that's good. Ah, but I'm hungry." He lights the bundle of sticks, breaks the eggs, makes an omelet, and eats it with delight.

But the flames burn the whale, which thrashes about convulsively. And that makes Pierrot seasick.

"I must be in a boat", he says.

The whale again starts to thrash about. Pierrot discovers a little chest at his feet. He opens it; it is full of gold, which the whale has swallowed during a shipwreck. He plays with the gold pieces; he is enchanted: now he can marry Columbine. But how to get out of here? "Some cable", he shouts, "if you please!".

Suddenly there can be heard the sound of music, which calms the whale. But Pierrot, carried away by the tune, starts to dance. This exasperates the monster, which regurgitates him little by little into the light. Pierrot is saved!

Cassander, Columbine, and Harlequin reenter to learn of Pierrot's fate. Columbine laments; Cassander consoles her; Harlequin is jubilant. "Come", Harlequin says: "Let's get married." Cassander responds: "To the Justice of the Peace!". "So be it!", says Columbine, tearfully.

A justice makes his appearance. "Draw up the contract", says Cassander. And the justice, who is none other than Pierrot (after the manner of M. Loyal in Tartuffe), writes the document out while down on one knee. Cassander signs, as does Columbine. At the moment of signing, Harlequin declares to the justice that he does not know how to write. "Make a cross", says the justice, "but you'll need some money for that."

Harlequin gives him a purse full of gold.

Just when Harlequin is about to make the cross, the justice pushes him away, throws off his wig and robe. It's Pierrot! Columbine is about to fling herself into his arms, when Cassander stops her. Pierrot falls to his knees and reveals his chest full of gold. Cassander consents to their union, and drives off Harlequin.

Apotheosis; fireworks.

== The "school" ==
=== Louis Rouffe ===
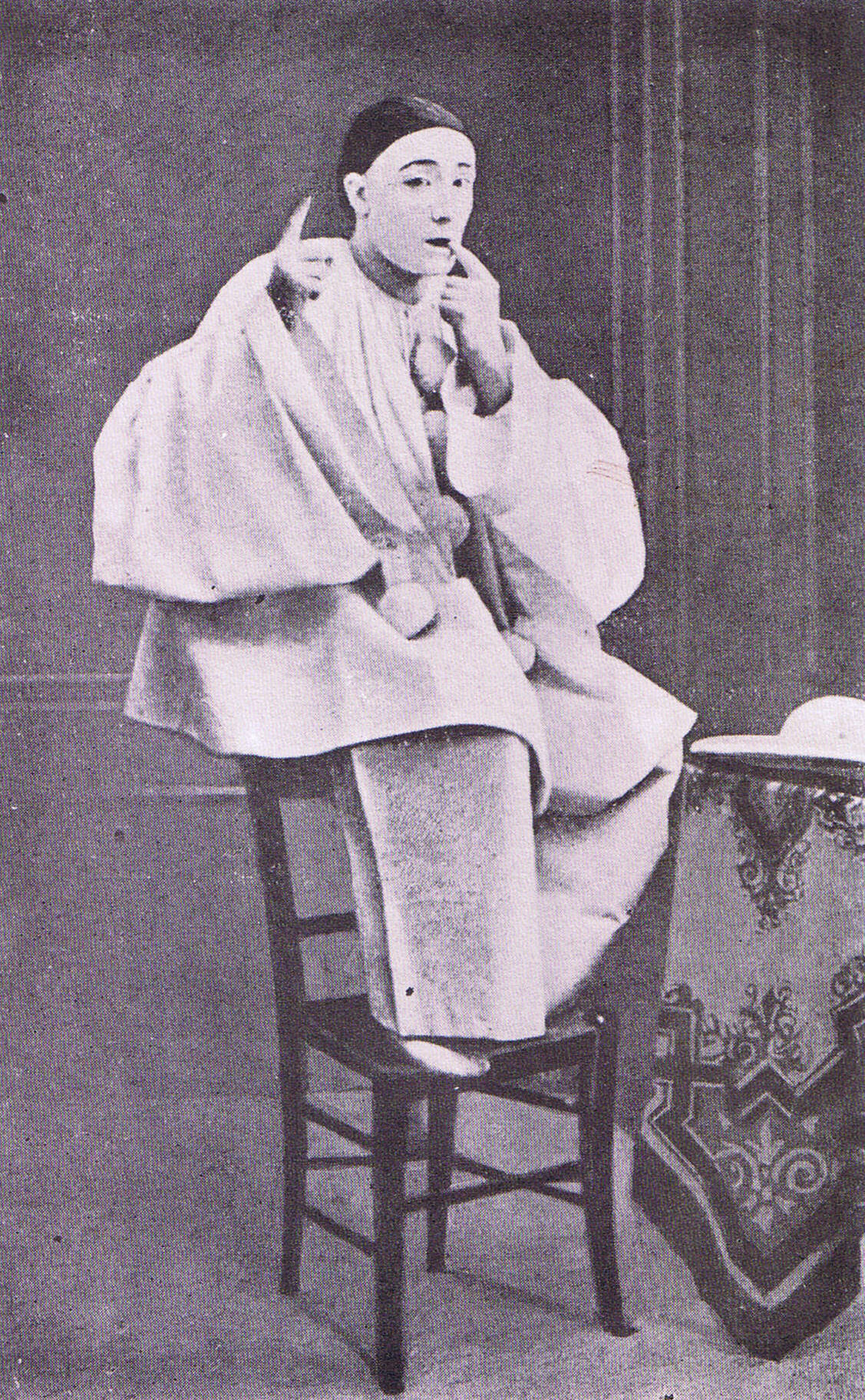
Louis Rouffe as Pierrot, c. 1880, in Séverin, L'Homme Blanc (Paris, 1929)

How Charles shaped the career of Louis Rouffe (1849–85) is still a matter of speculation. A mime who never played in Paris—at thirty-six, he died even younger than Charles, and all hopes of performing in the capital were defeated—Rouffe is a shadowy figure in the history of French pantomime, having enjoyed little of the publicity of his Parisian predecessors. Unlike Charles Deburau, he left none of his work in print, and, unlike his student Séverin, he did not live long enough to write his memoirs. But the little that is known of him suggests an independent spirit, closer to Legrand than to Deburau fils. According to Hugounet, Rouffe was determined that "his art should not remain imprisoned in the bands of tradition. He set himself the task of enlarging it and making it enter the current of modern thought, thereby realizing the program traced by Champfleury in his book on the Funambules." Hugounet goes on to remark that Rouffe's work was an "eloquent albeit mute response to Francisque Sarcey, who reproached Paul Legrand for his wish to express in pantomime that which lay outside its domain—ideas". Like Legrand, Rouffe often performed in character costume, setting aside Pierrot's white blouse and trousers, thereby earning him the epithet "l'Homme Blanc". All of this suggests that, although Rouffe undertook formal study with Charles, he had been more impressed, in various ways, by the Legrand who had played at the Alcazar in Bordeaux from 1864 to 1870. And the career of Rouffe's student Séverin Cafferra (or simply "Séverin", as he preferred) represents a betrayal of Charles's pantomimic traditions in still other important respects.

=== Séverin ===
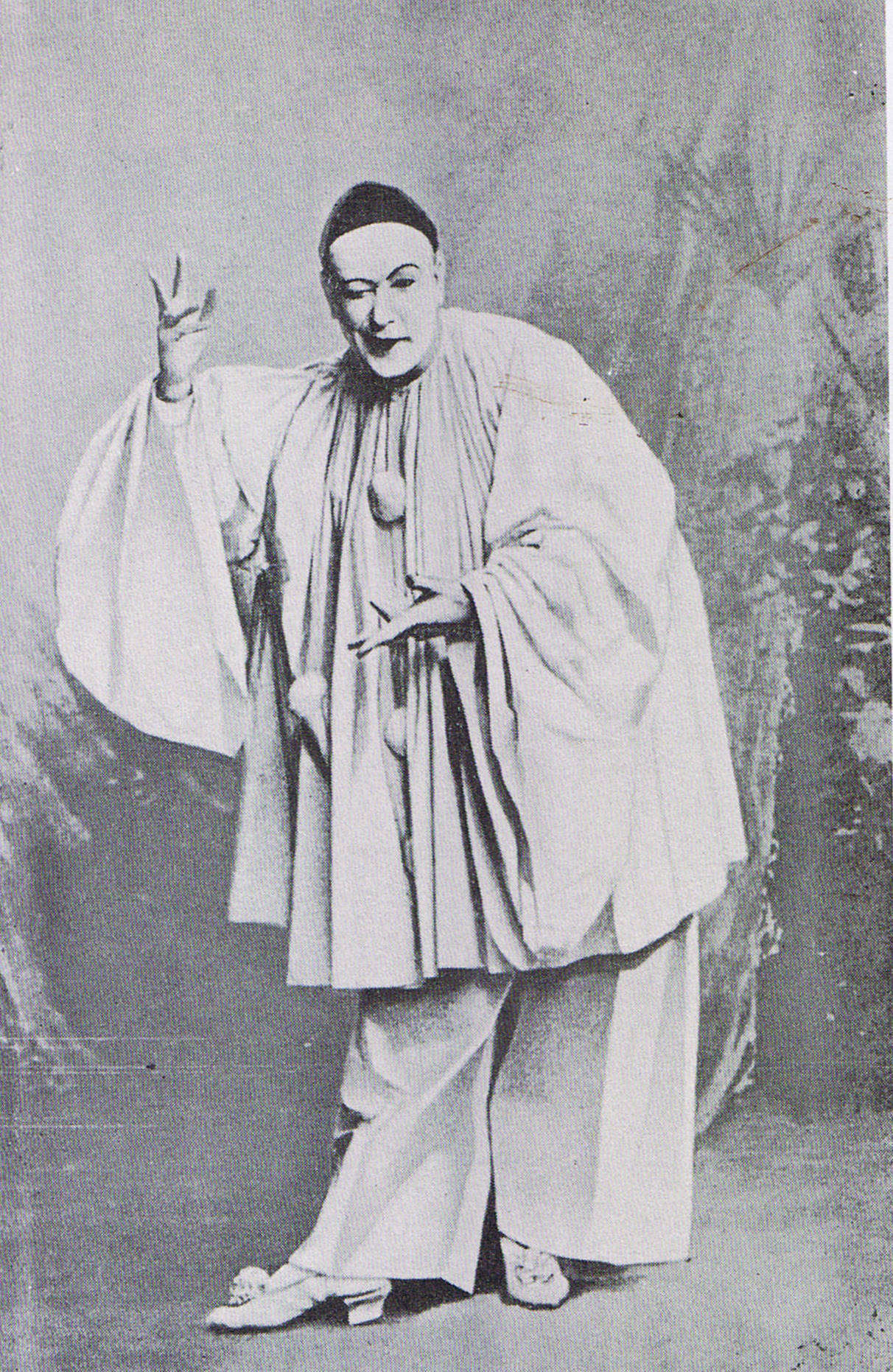
Séverin as Pierrot, c. 1896, in Séverin, L'Homme Blanc (Paris, 1929)

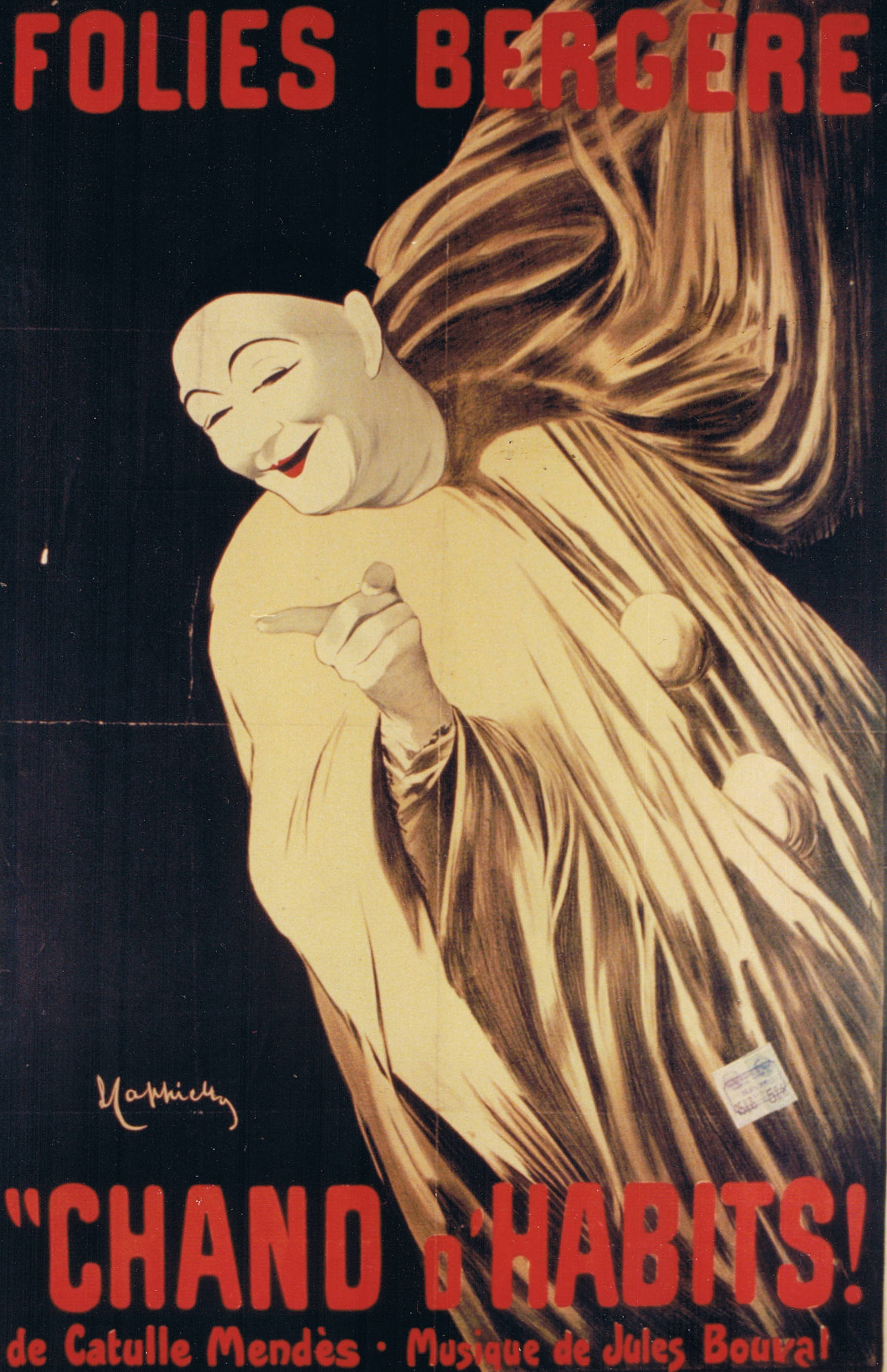
Happichy: Séverin in Mendès's Chand d'habits!, poster of 1896

When Séverin (1863–1930) introduced his mature art to Paris, he did so with the pantomime Poor Pierrot, or After the Ball (1891), which concludes with Pierrot's death. He seems to have considered his début as something of an audacity: he remarked that, when he brought the pantomime to Marseille, his audience received Pierrot's dying with stunned silence, before deciding to applaud the piece (Charles Deburau, whose Pierrot never flirted with the tragic, would have regarded it as apostasy). But he was bent upon forging his own way with Pierrot's character: it had annoyed him, after Rouffe's death in 1885, to be congratulated on resuscitating his master's spirit in his performances. "I wanted to be me", he writes in his Souvenirs; "I began to write plays [of my own]." He was pleased with the innovations he brought to his art: "Henceforth", he wrote, after Poor Pierrot, "Pierrot could suffer and even die, like every human being." But the fate that awaited his titular hero was not so novel as Séverin implied.

==== The doomed Pierrot: a brief history ====
===== Théophile Gautier's "Shakspeare aux Funambules" =====
Pierrot had died a famous death much earlier in the century, when Gautier, an unabashed lover of pantomime and especially of Jean-Gaspard's art, had invented a piece at the Funambules and then "reviewed" it in the Revue de Paris of 4 September 1842 (the "review" was then, only a few weeks later, turned into a pantomime, The Ol' Clo's Man [Le Marrrchand d'habits!], by an anonymous librettist for the Funambules). Pierrot, in love with a duchess, runs a sword through the back of an old-clothes man and steals his bag of wares. Rigged out in his ill-gotten finery, he courts the duchess—and he wins her. But at their wedding, the ghost of the peddler rises up from the floor, pulls Pierrot to his chest for a dance, and impales him on the tip of the sword. Pierrot dies as the curtain falls. This is the first unarguably "tragic" Pierrot of the nineteenth century, or of any century previous (Gautier had obviously had "high" drama in mind: he titled his review "Shakspeare [sic] at the Funambules", invoking memories of Macbeth, and he doubtless expected his French readers to recall the end of Molière's Don Juan—and perhaps of Mozart's Don Giovanni—when the Commander's statue pays a visit to his murderer). Gautier's "review" was widely admired by the literati, and it was instrumental in taking the character of Pierrot one step beyond the tearful, sentimental creation of Legrand (Legrand, himself, deplored such a step, tolerating "the macabre, the terrible", as he told Paul Margueritte, only as "accidental, quickly borne away by fantasy and dream").

===== Henri Rivière's Pierrot =====
One writer who particularly profited from the piece was the naval officer-cum-novelist Henri Rivière. In 1860, he published Pierrot, a novella in which a young mime, Charles Servieux, conceives of his Pierrot as a "fallen angel". After watching Deburau père perform one evening (or, rather, a Deburau refracted through "Shakspeare at the Funambules"), Servieux slowly begins to construct in his mind "a genius of evil, grandiose and melancholic, of an irresistible seductiveness, cynical one instant and clownish the next—in order to raise himself up still higher after having fallen". Pierrot's new-found villainy is put to good use when his Columbine grows too familiar with Harlequin: Pierrot decapitates his rival—in reality, not fiction—in the middle of a pantomime.

===== Paul Margueritte's Pierrot assassin de sa femme =====
The young Paul Margueritte, an aspiring mime, whose cousin Stéphane Mallarmé had sung the praises of both Legrand and Deburau fils, one day stumbled upon Rivière's novella, which fired his romantic imagination. Two lines from Gautier's play Posthumous Pierrot (1847)—"The tale of Pierrot, who tickled his wife/And thus made her, with laughter, give up her life"—gave him a plot, and his Pierrot, Murderer of His Wife (1881) was born. Like the Pierrot of "Shakspeare at the Funambules" and of Rivière's Pierrot, Margueritte's anti-hero is a murderer, though one of an impressive ingenuity: to leave no trace of his crime, he tickles the soles of his Columbine's feet until she literally laughs to death. Yet, like his criminal predecessors, he pays very dearly for that crime: for as he turns, drunken, into bed after enacting all the details of the fateful act, he sets his bedclothes alight with his candle and then perishes in the flames.

Margueritte sent copies of his pantomime to several writers who he hoped would take notice; he performed it at a number of venues—most importantly before Edmond de Goncourt and other notables at a soirée of Alphonse Daudet's—and in 1888 the impresario Antoine produced it at the Théâtre Libre. In the early 1880s, the "Decadence" was gathering force in France, and Margueritte's Pierrot (and others like him) would be in the forefront of the movement. The ground was, then, more than amply prepared for the success of Séverin's Poor Pierrot.

===== Charles Deburau and fin-de-siècle pantomime =====
In fact, Séverin must have known of some or even all of these developments, certainly "Shakspeare at the Funambules" (or the Funambules piece that it spawned), maybe the Margueritte pantomime. What role did Charles Deburau play in all this? Very little apparently. After instructing Rouffe in pantomimic technique, and after Rouffe's in turn instructing Séverin, he disappeared as an agent of direction of their pantomime, the currents of the Zeitgeist bearing it into metamorphoses of which he could not have imagined or, probably, condoned. Few traces of his art are visible in Poor Pierrot; fewer still in Séverin's pantomimes to come. The '90s (or, rather, certain aspects of the '90s—collectively called the Decadence—to which Séverin wished to appeal) had little sympathy with the naive and innocent figure of either of the Deburaux' creation. What stirred it was what had visited Gautier's prescient imagination when, a half-century earlier, he had dared to conceive a murderous and mortal Pierrot. It seems almost inevitable that, in 1896, Séverin would perform in Chand d'habits! (The Ol' Clo's Man)—a pantomime by Catulle Mendès, Gautier's ex-son-in-law, that was derived (once more) from "Shakspeare at the Funambules".
