= Pol Mercier =

French playwright and librettist (1819–1874)

Pol Mercier, real name Jean-Étienne-Polydore Mercier (25 April 1819 – 11 May 1874) was a 19th-century French playwright and librettist.

He was born and died in Rochefort, Charente-Maritime. His plays were presented on the most significant Parisian stages of his time including the Folies-nouvelles, the Théâtre de l'Odéon, the Comédie-française, and the Théâtre des Variétés.

== Works ==
- 1846: Un Nuage au ciel, comédie en vaudevilles in 1 act, with Jean-François-Alfred Bayard
- 1850: Freluchette, opéra comique in one act
- 1851: Christian et Marguerite, comedy in 1 act, in verse, with Édouard Fournier
- 1852: Méridien, one-act comédie en vaudevilles, with Clairville and Raymond Deslandes
- 1853: Le Roman du village, one-act comedy in verse, with Fournier
- 1855: Biribi, pantomime, foreword by Théophile Gautier
- 1855: Le Chevrier blanc, conte-pantomime extravaganza in 5 tableaux, with Paul Legrand
- 1855: La Sœur de Pierrot, mimodrama extravaganza in 5 tableaux, with Legrand
- 1855: La Sœur grise !, scène lyrique, music by Édouard Montaubry
- 1857: Le Calfat, operetta
- 1857: Ce Scélérat de Poireau !, one-act comédie en vaudevilles, with Clairville and Amédée de Jallais
- 1857: Le Gardien des scellés, one-act comédie en vaudevilles, with Clairville and de Jallais
- 1857: Triolet, one-act comédie en vaudevilles, with Clairville
- 1859: Le Diable rose, play with ariettes in 1 act, with Fournier
- 1860: Un Troupier qui suit les bonnes, 3-act comédie en vaudeville, with Clairville and Léon Morand
- 1862: Le Paradis trouvé, comedy in 1 act, in verse, with Fournier
- 1863: Le Chagrin de Marie, romance
- 1863: Les Trois Normandes, opérette bouffe in 1 act, with Frédéric Barbier (music)
- 1864: Les Cochers de Paris, popular play in 3 acts and 4 tableaux, with Clairville and Morand
- 1864: Le Pavillon des amours, one-act comédie en vaudevilles, with Henri Vernier
- 1864: Deux permissions de dix heures, operetta in 1 act, with Henry Currat and Frédéric Barbier (music), 1864
- 1864: Les Trois Berrichons, vaudeville in 1 act

== Bibliography ==
- Georges d'Heylli, Dictionnaire des Pseudonymes, 1868, p. 78
