= Michel Dumas (painter) =

French painter (1812 – 1885)

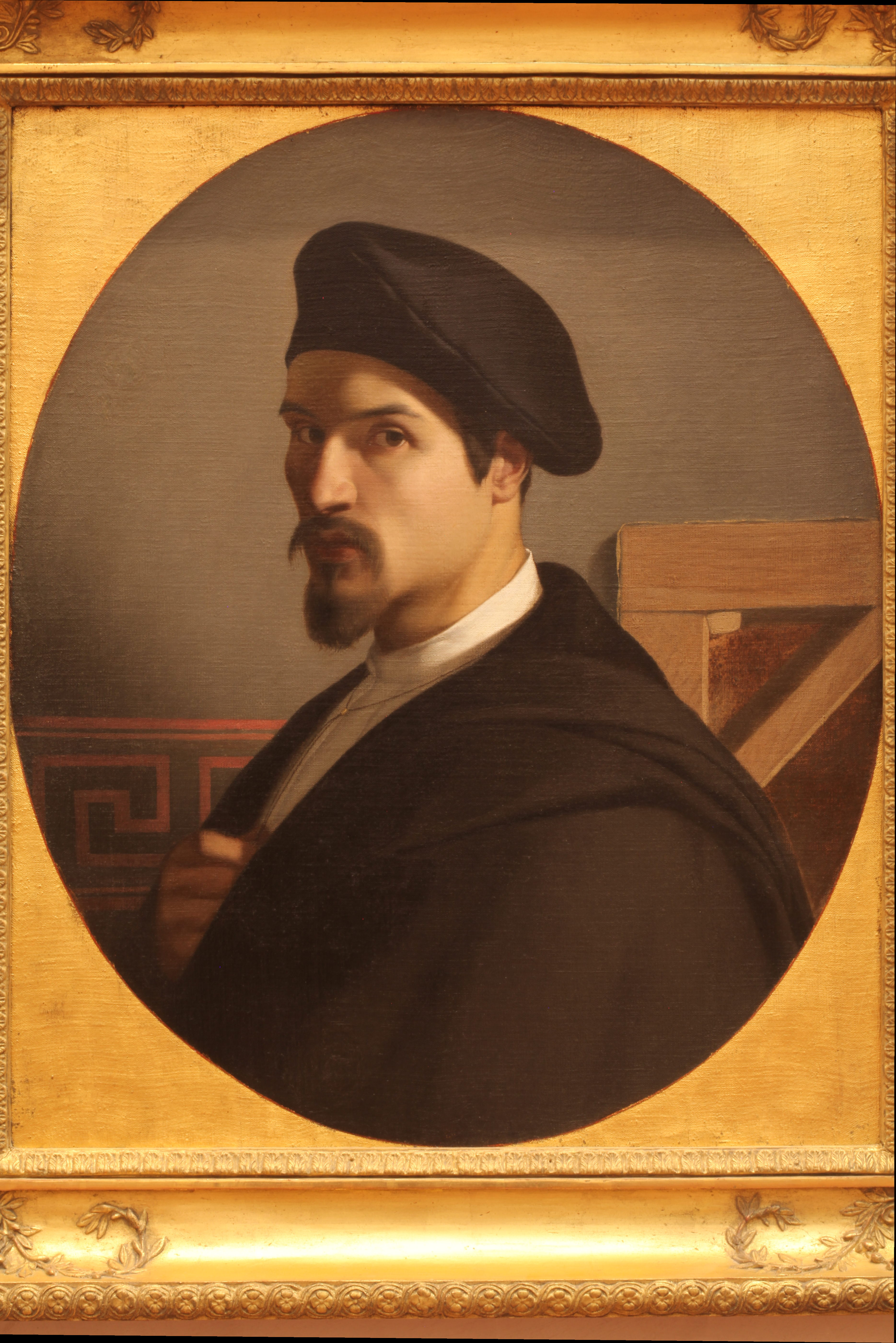
Self-portrait (date unknown)

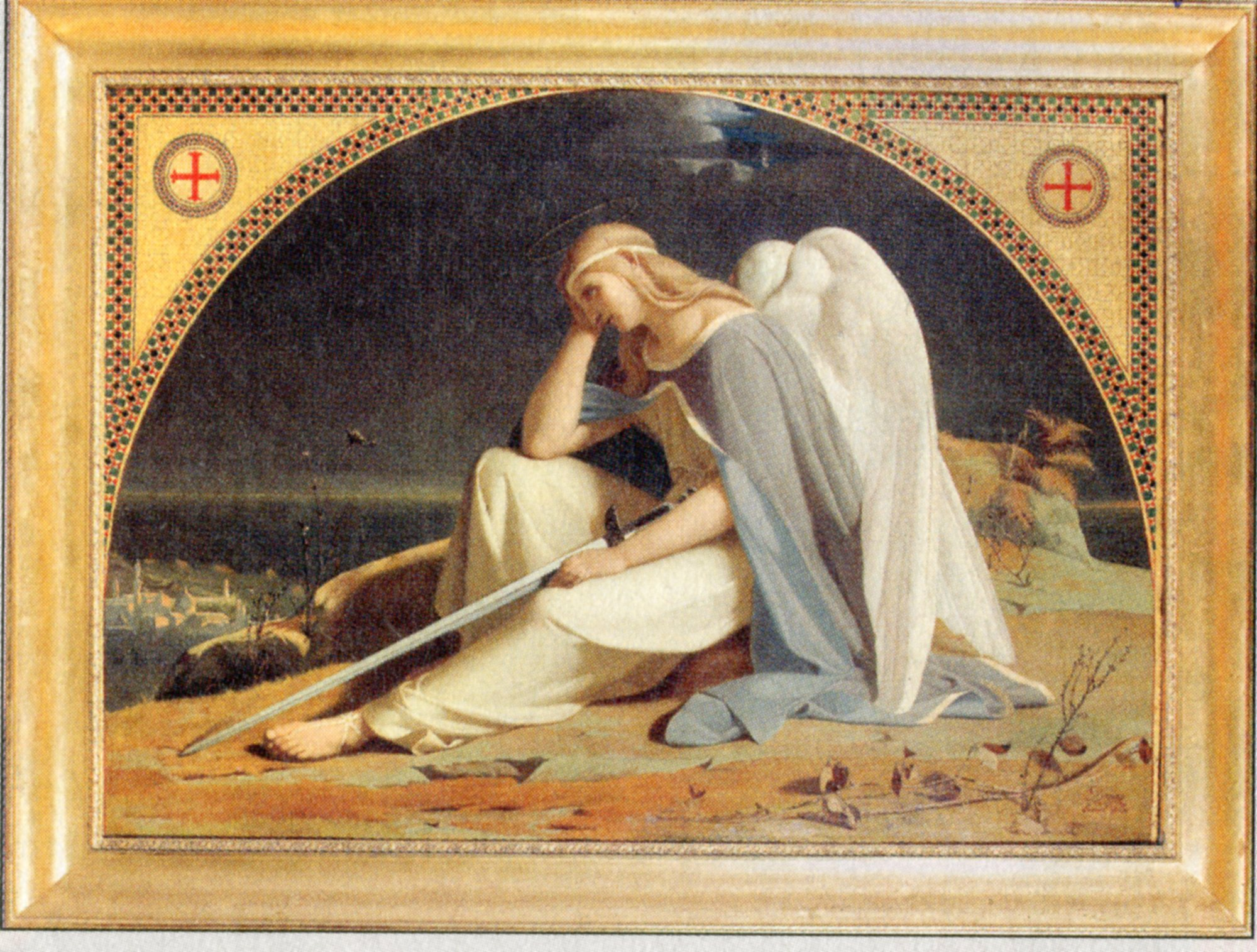
Guardian Angel

Michel Dumas (19 June 1812 – 26 June 1885) was a French painter, primarily of religious subjects.

== Life and work ==
Born in Lyon, he was a student of Claude Bonnefond and Jean-Michel Grobon at the École des Beaux-Arts de Lyon, a school where he would be a teacher himself, many years later. In 1834, he moved to Paris, where he worked in the studios of Jean-Auguste-Dominique Ingres at the École Nationale Supérieure des Beaux-Arts. After Ingres moved to Rome, he became an assistant to Victor Orsel and Alphonse Périn at the church of Notre-Dame-de-Lorette.

He then joined Ingres in Italy, spending sixteen years in Rome before returning to Paris, where he specialized in religious art. Later, he went back to Lyon, to take the position of Director at his old alma mater. He was named a Knight in the Legion of Honor in 1884. He died in Lyon in 1885.

His best known students include Tony Tollet and François Guiguet. His works may be seen at the Musée d'art et d'histoire de Langres, the Musée des beaux-arts de Lyon, and the Louvre, among several others.
