= Hippolyte Ballue =

French painter

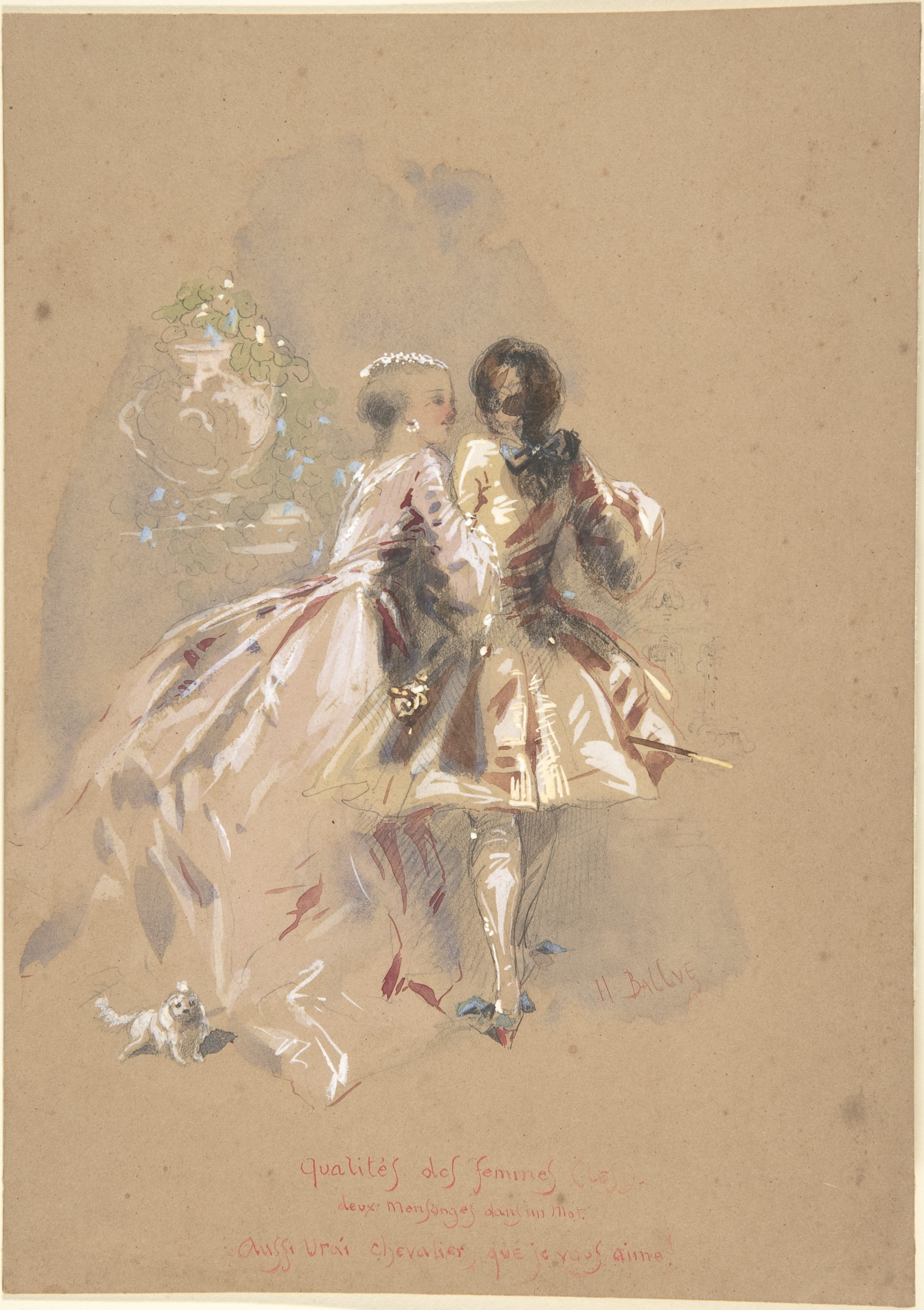
Young Couple Seen From Behind by Hippolyte Ballue

Hippolyte Omer Ballue (1817–1867) was a 19th-century French landscape painter.

Born in Paris, he was a follower of Narcisse Virgilio Díaz. He exhibited at the Salon from 1842 to 1851. He painted in vibrant hues landscape from Paris, Algeria and Sicily. He also designed costumes for theater (especially Paul Legrand).

He worked with oil painting but also pastels and watercolour.
