= Good and Evil (painting) =

Painting by Victor Orsel

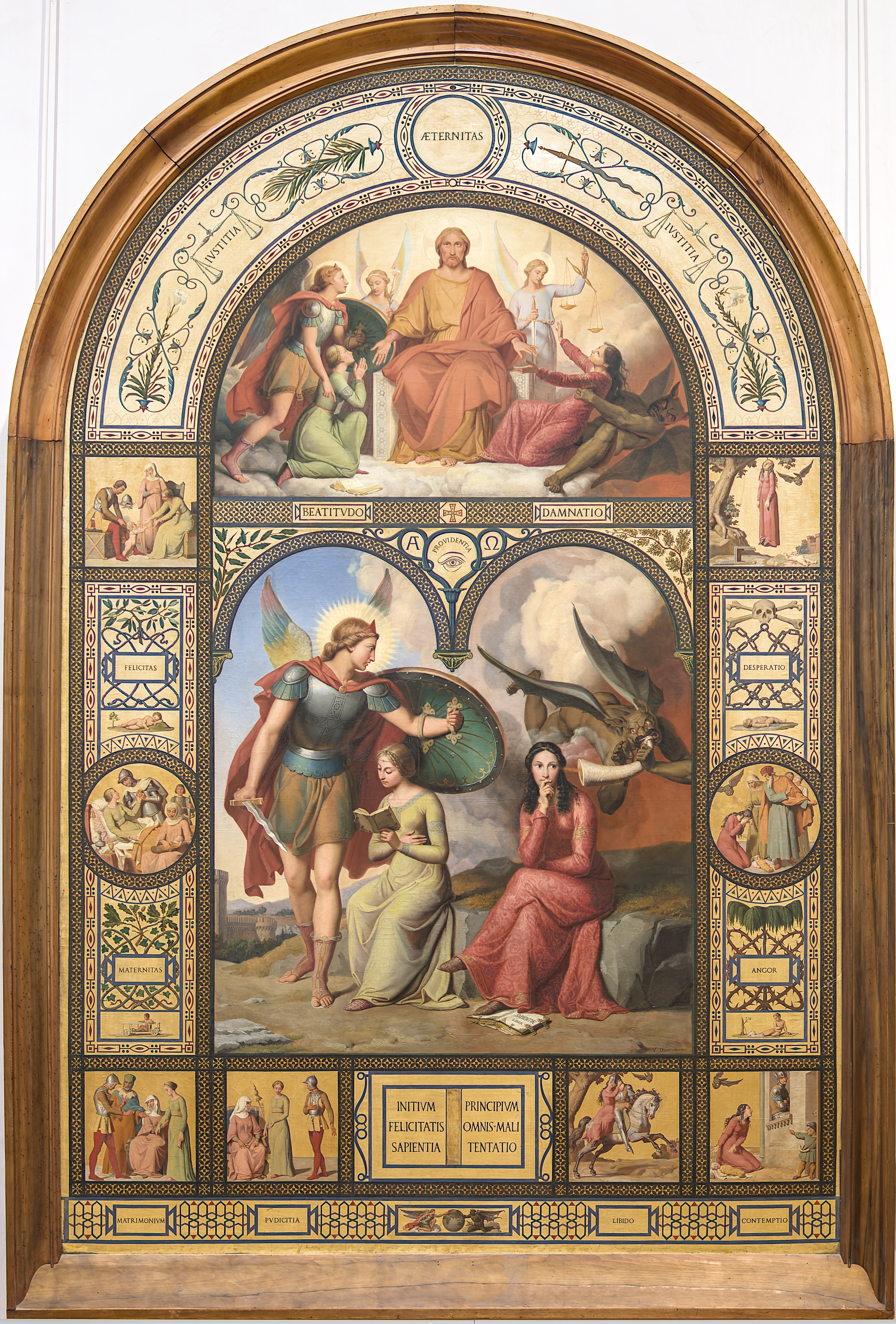
Good and Evil (1829-1832) by Victor Orsel

Good and Evil (French - Le Bien et le Mal) is a painting by Victor Orsel, begun in Rome in 1829 and completed in Paris in 1832 after several preparatory works.

It had several influences, especially from the artist's stay in Italy. The painting is divided into two halves, one showing a virtuous way of life leading a faithful person to the Kingdom of God and the other an evil way of life leading to Hell. Orsel uses religious imagery and Latin words to intensify the impact of the moral. Orsel used medieval techniques and religious themes not used by other contemporary paintings, though he combined them with Masonic elements. First exhibited at the Paris Salon of 1833, the critics noted the work for its didactic and "archaic" character. Théophile Gautier compared it to Orcagna, Pinturicchio and "other artists of the angelic school", whilst Le Go assessed Orsel's style as closer to that of the Nazarenes. The work's detractors emphasised the odd juxtaposition of imitation of medieval paintings with the lack of any religious sentiments - Auguste Jal called it a "profane polyptych", whilst the Protestant Athanase Coquerel fils criticised Orsel for his lack of convictions and sensibility and for his not "being followed by his faith".

== Sources ==
- http://www.culture.gouv.fr/public/mistral/joconde_fr?ACTION=CHERCHER&FIELD_1=REF&VALUE_1=000PE026294
