= Paul Legrand =

French mime artist (1816–1898)

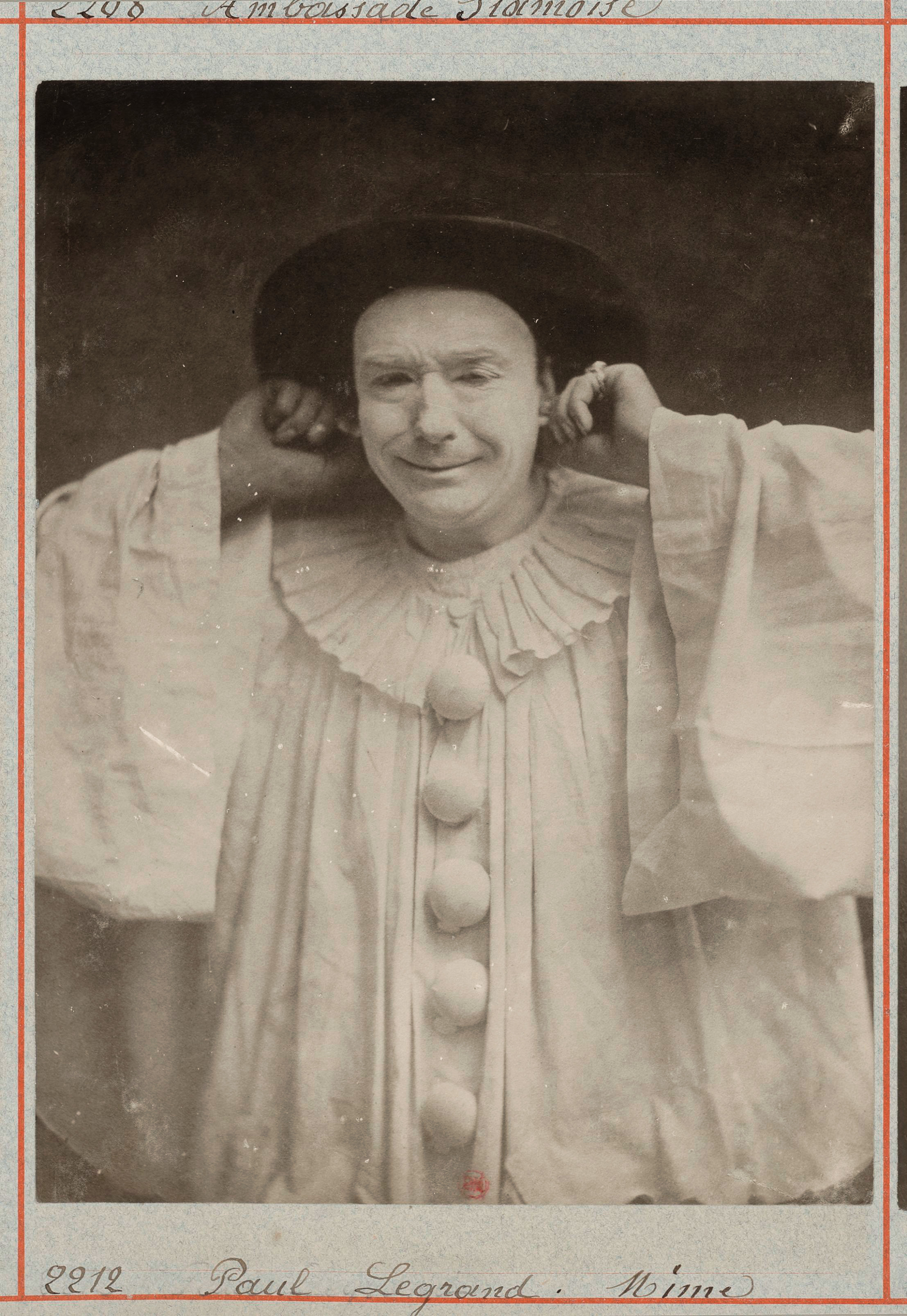
Nadar: Paul Legrand as Pierrot, c. 1857

Paul Legrand (French pronunciation: [pɔl ləɡʁɑ̃]; January 4, 1816 – April 16, 1898), born Charles-Dominique-Martin Legrand, was a highly regarded and influential French mime who turned the Pierrot of his predecessor, Jean-Gaspard Deburau, into the tearful, sentimental character that is most familiar to post-19th-century admirers of the figure. He was the first of the Parisian mimes of his era (the second was Deburau fils) to take his art abroad—to London, in late 1847, for a holiday engagement at the Adelphi—and, after triumphs in mid-century Paris at the Folies-Nouvelles, he entertained audiences in Cairo and Rio de Janeiro. In the last years of the century, he was a member of the Cercle Funambulesque, a theatrical society that promoted work, especially pantomime, inspired by the commedia dell'arte, past and present. The year of his death coincided with the last year of the Cercle's existence.

== Life and career ==
Like Deburau père, he was of humble birth—he was the son of a grocer in Saintes—but, unlike Deburau, whose vocation seems to have been chosen by his father, he was early drawn to the Parisian stage by an irresistible love of the theater. He made his debut in 1839 at the Concert Bonne-Nouvelle; there his "unique ambition", according to his biographer "J.M.", "was, in this time of naïveté, to play the Lovers of vaudeville ... ". When, later in that same year, he signed on with the management of the Théâtre des Funambules, where Deburau still held sway, it was as the "comic" of the vaudevilles and the lover, Leander, of the pantomimes. But it was Pierrot, according to Deburau's biographer, Tristan Rémy, "that better suited his fancy", and, after understudying the master for a half-dozen years, he appeared in the role in 1845, probably in the many revivals of old pantomimes. When Deburau died in 1846, he assumed the white blouse in all the new pieces.

In the following year, however, Deburau's son, Jean-Charles ("Charles", as he preferred [1829–1873]), also made his debut as Pierrot at the same theater, and its manager, Charles-Louis Billion, careless of finding ways to harmonize their disparate talents, ended up fomenting rivalry between them. As a consequence, Legrand left the theater in 1853, finding employment across the street at the Folies-Concertantes, which, after several months, underwent renovation, then was reopened as the Folies-Nouvelles. This would remain Legrand's venue until 1859, and it was here that he won the wide admiration of the public. When the theater changed hands, and its new director proved unsympathetic to pantomime, the years of his itinerancy began: two years in Brazil, then a long stint at the Théâtre Alcazar in Bordeaux (1864–1870); an Egyptian tour in 1870. When he returned to Paris after the Franco-Prussian War and the Commune, it was for an eight-year engagement at the Tertulia, a café-spectacle that had little of the old luster of the Folies-Nouvelles. The last two years of his professional career (1886–1887) were spent at the Théâtre-Vivienne, which catered primarily to children.

In his retirement, Legrand published a volume of his pantomimes and gave his support to the Cercle Funambulesque, which was founded in 1888. He appeared as Pierrot in its first program—in a "Prologue" with verses by Jacques Normand and music by Auguste Chapuis—and, in its third program, performed in one of his own pieces, Bureaucrat Pierrot. But at seventy-two, he would mainly serve the Cercle as a spectator, as young mimes took over his role.

Paul Legrand is interred in the Père Lachaise Cemetery in Paris (section 36^{c}).

== Pantomime ==
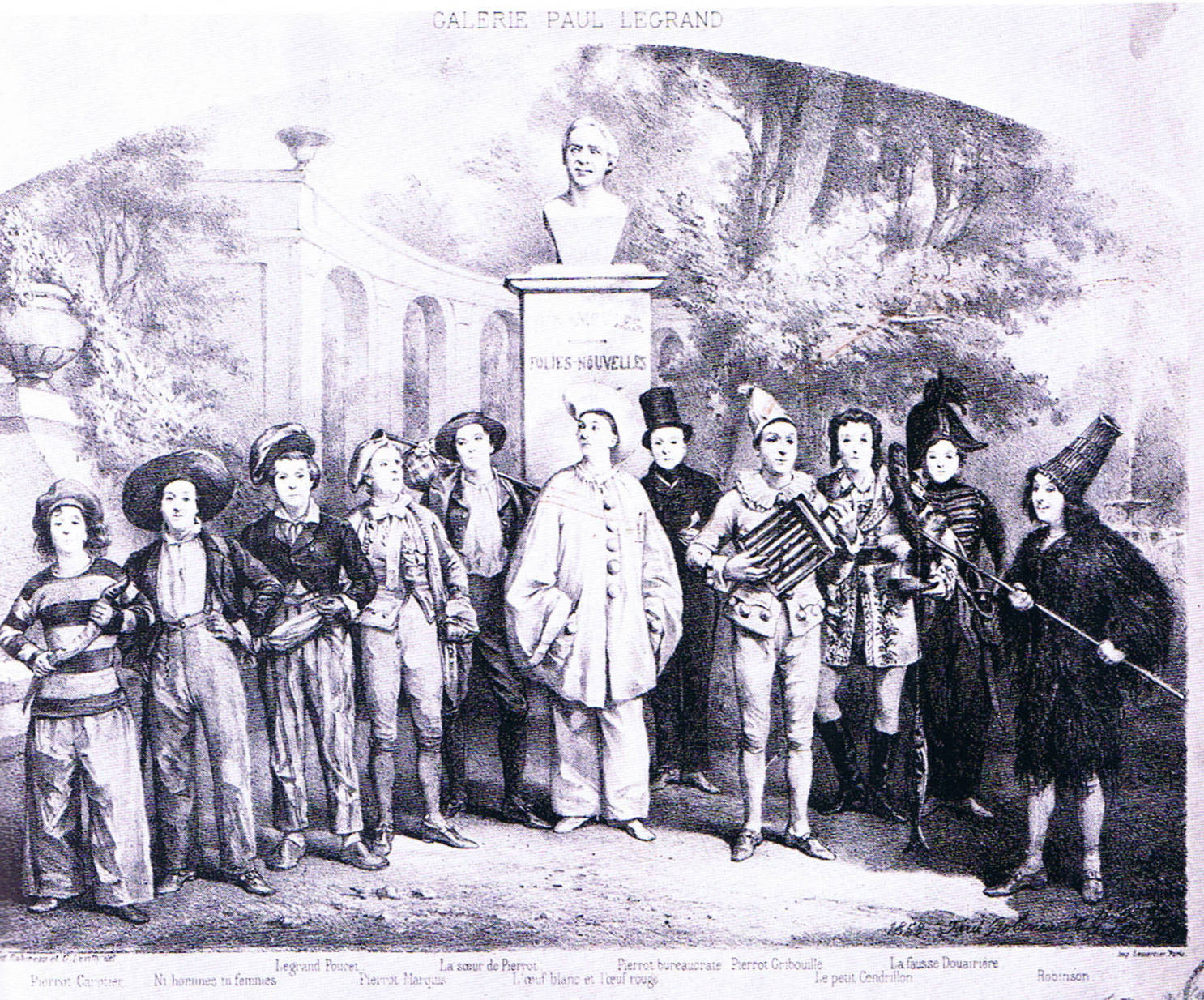
F. Robineau and G. Levilly: Galerie Paul Legrand (1858): Legrand in his most memorable roles at the Funambules and Folies-Nouvelles (click on image to enlarge)

Legrand's physique seemed, to the admirers of his predecessor, unsuited to pantomime. Charles Deburau complained to the mime Séverin that he was too thick-set, his trunk and arms too short, his face too fat and round for a mime; he lacked elegance and grace. The poet and journalist Théophile Gautier, in a review of The Wager (1846), performed by Legrand at the Funambules, also missed "that unusually long musculature in the legs and arms—natural in some [mimes], obtained in others by dint of hard work—which allowed Mazurier and Ravel to execute their astonishing leaps", and he counseled lessons in "the difficult art ... of delivering and receiving the kick". But Legrand's schooling had been in the roles of the lover Leander, not in those of the acrobatic Zanni; he brought a dramatic (and romantic) sensibility to his Pierrot. And soon Gautier began to value the difference: when Legrand appeared in Marquis Pierrot (1847), a pantomime by Champfleury, Gautier compared him, in the range and finesse of his acting, to the great comic actor Hugues Bouffé: "inasmuch as he is humble, piteous, melancholy, greedy, wheedling, stealthy, endearing, hypocritical in the first part of the piece, so is he arrogant, insolent, scornful—a regular Marquis de Moncade—in the second. What unprecedented truthfulness, what depth of observation ... ". It was not the musculature but the mask that was important to Legrand, as Gautier gradually realized: "How many shades of feeling", he wrote of Legrand's performance in The Brigands for Laughs (1857), "how many ideas he summoned beneath this thick layer of flour that serves him as mask!".

Deburau's great successes had come in the "pantomime-féerie", featuring frenetic (sometimes violent) action in a fairy-land of transformations, tricks, and triumphs. Legrand's talents lay elsewhere. It was in the subtle, even touching, dramas of his Pierrot that he found his métier, and it was in the "realistic" pantomime that he excelled. At the Folies-Nouvelles he came into his maturity, as another review by Gautier suggests; this is of Pierrot Dandin (1854), written by the mime and Charles Bridault, and the review should be quoted at length:

... what absolutely must be seen is Paul Legrand in Pierrot Dandin. We doubt whether Tiercelin, who played cobblers so well that it is said he could have been transferred to the shoemakers, was ever better at drawing on his hand-leather, at manipulating the knife and the awl, at squaring a sole, at nailing a bit of leather over a frame: one would truly think he has done nothing but this all his life. —But where he is superb is in the scene in which, returning home with a dress, a little shawl, and an apple turnover he has brought for his wife, he finds the conjugal nest deserted and, in place of the unfaithful spouse, a letter revealing that Madame Pierrot has left with the seducer Leander. It must indeed be difficult to make people cry when one is wearing a little black skullcap, when one is sporting a face plastered with flour and a ridiculous costume. Well! Paul Legrand expresses his sadness in such a naïve, true, touching, and profoundly heartfelt manner that the puppet disappears, leaving only the man. In the stage-boxes, the giddiest madcaps forgot to run their tongues over their green barley-sugar sticks and smothered their sobs behind their lace handkerchiefs.

So devoted was Legrand to this conception of the character—as sensitive and vulnerable, his juddering heart on his sleeve—that, when he was consigned to a pantomime recalling Deburau's stage, he simply turned it into one of his own. The Pierrot of Pol Mercier's Bureaucrat Pierrot (1856) was conceived as a scamp and a layabout:

In the administrative bureau of a railroad, Pierrot is a very lazy, very inaccurate clerk. At the office he spends all his time in distracting his colleagues and playing a thousand little tricks on them. Sometimes he eats this one's lunch; sometimes he drinks that one's little carafe of wine.

So reads the pantomime scenario; what follows is Gautier's review of the piece:

... the sight of this pantomime has filled our soul with melancholy. What! Pierrot, from whom of old one borrowed a pen—"to write a word"—and who loaned it so willingly, having not the least bit of interest in it himself, has been reduced by the misery of the times to making it run from morning to night over musty old documents! ... Pierrot! no longer daring to wear his white blouse and his wide trousers! Pierrot in a black suit! And what a black suit! threadbare, tight, curled at the cuffs with age, its seams blackened with ink: a perfect poem of respectable misery! —When he sits down, what pitiful angles his knees make! How pointed his elbows are! What a black gaze is in that pale and flour-covered face! This is what has become of the joyous Pierrot of the pantomime. Pierrot has a profession; Pierrot is employed. He has been made to realize that a century as serious as our own will not suffer the idle!

Gautier's remark about Legrand's black suit says something else about the mime: that he was as comfortable in character costume (Deburau initiated the practice) as he was in the garb of Pierrot. About this Gautier was ambivalent: the "truthfulness" of Legrand's acting was unprecedented, but how welcome it was for the spectator still enchanted by the fantasy of Deburau's stage was a valid question: "By virtue of the verisimilitude of his acting", writes Gautier, "[Legrand] turns the fantastic type into a human character whose white face comes as a surprise. He often even abandons the linen blouse and trousers, retaining only the plaster mask, in order to represent beings that are more real." The "realism" of Legrand's pantomime marked a dramatic—and, for some, a disturbing—turn in the fortunes of Pierrot.

== The Realist Movement and the Folies-Nouvelles ==
In some respects, Pierrot's turn of fortunes was inevitable. The Folies-Nouvelles was not the Funambules, and neither of its administrators, Louis Huart and Marie-Michel Altaroche, was an unlettered Billion. The renovators of the Folies had intended to transport its spectators to an elegant "little theater at Naples or Venice", with no stinting on luxuriant details, and its directors prided themselves on their intellectual credentials, as both were contributors to the light art and journalism of the day. The aim was to attract a high-toned and enlightened public, and, to the enlightened of the early 1850s, realism (and its handmaid, satire) was the style in vogue. Even before Legrand had left the Funambules, the pioneering realist Champfleury had dedicated himself to a reform of the pantomime: "to realize for the mimic art what Diderot had done for the comedy—that is to say, bourgeoise pantomime." His Marquis Pierrot (1847) marked the beginning of the pantomimic revolution, as Gautier understood immediately, noting that its premiere "dated a new era in the poetics of the Funambules":

M. Champfleury gives to the allegorical whiteness of Pierrot a wholly physical cause: it is the flour from the mill [where he works] that is sprinkled over the face of this pale and melancholy personage. One could not find a more plausible means of giving probability to this white phantom ...: it is clear that the era of the Catholic art is closing for the pantomime and the era of the Protestant art beginning. Authority and tradition no longer exist; the doctrine of independent inquiry is about to bear its fruits. Goodbye to the naive formulas, the byzantine barbarities, the impossible complexions: analysis is opening its scalpel and is going to begin its dissections.

It was doubtless this invitation to "independent inquiry", as well as Gautier's dithyrambic praise of Legrand's performance in the piece, that drew so many artists and writers into collaborative creation with the mime. Among the contributors of pantomimes to Legrand's repertoire later at the Folies-Nouvelles were the poet Fernand Desnoyers, the composer Charles Plantade, the painter Hippolyte Ballue, and several well-known disciples of the new realism, especially in its satirical and caricatural forms—the Comte de Noé, the caricaturist known as Cham; Jean-Pierre Dantan, the sculptor of caricatural statuettes; Gaspard-Félix Tournachon, the photographer and cartoonist known as Nadar; and of course Champfleury himself. Even Gustave Flaubert wrote a pantomime for Legrand, though it was rejected by Huart and Altaroche (apparently on the grounds that it was insufficiently realistic).

Like realism and satire, parody was welcome at the Folies-Nouvelles. In 1858, Donizetti's opera Lucrezia Borgia was given a drubbing in Legrand and Bridault's In Venice, or Dagger, Gallows, and Rat Poison. Among the members of the cast were Pierrotini (Legrand), "of noble race but very clumsy", Caliborgna, "so named because of a halberd that had been stuck in her eye and forgotten", and Gros-Bêta, "villain, with no manners whatsoever". Legrand was not above poking fun at himself—as he did in The Little Cendrillon (1857), a tale, as Storey puts it, "of a white-faced Cinderfella", or in Le Grand Poucet (1858), the punning title of which alerted his audience to the ensuing self-mocking fun. As his tenure at the Folies drew to a close, Legrand could even be said to have been teetering on a kind of pantomimic decadence. Storey describes a piece from the last year before he left the theater:

In Bridault's Les Folies-Nouvelles peintes par elles-mêmes [The Folies-Nouvelles' Self-Portrait] (1858), which announced the theater's reopening after summer renovations of the salle, the concierge of the establishment, one Père Pétrin, invokes the pantomimic muse of its stage. It is she, he remarks, to whom the audience owes its entertainment, she who inspires its authors "in the simple goal of molding the mind and the heart". He cites as examples of such inspiration the maxims that conclude Pierrot millionnaire [1857] and Le Petit Cendrillon: "Money does not bring happiness!" and "Polished boots make good husbands!". The muse replies: "You're caustic, Père Pétrin!".

But apparently Legrand drew back from this brink of cynicism, for when Pierrot, incarnated by younger mimes, crossed the barriers that had forestalled him from violations of his own naïveté, Legrand demurred. After enjoying some success with his Pierrot, Murderer of his Wife (1881), a pantomime in which a disillusioned Pierrot tickles Columbine to death, the young Paul Margueritte interviewed Legrand, now an aging artist whose triumphs at the Folies lay far behind him. Margueritte's reception was not warm. "The macabre, the terrible", he wrote in his memoir Le Printemps tourmenté (1925), "Paul Legrand only tolerated it as accidental, quickly borne away by fantasy and dream." And it was Legrand's old Pierrot, unstained by crime and disillusionment, that would survive into the twenty-first century.

== Specimen pantomime: Pierrot's Dream ==
Pierrot enters carrying newspapers and a doll. The newspapers for himself, the doll for his little girl, who is sleeping in the next room. Having checked on her sleep, he doesn't want to disturb it, so plunges into the reading of his newspapers, which, after filling him with horror, end up by putting him to sleep, too. A dream arrives. Pierrot, now a sleepwalker, gets up, seizes the carafe in which his hallucinated gaze sees some excellent Tokay, and drinks bumper after bumper. A little tipsy, he picks up the doll, believing it to be his daughter; he rocks it to put it back to sleep, smooths its little face and hair, and, growing annoyed over his exertions in undressing it for bed, he throws it on the floor.

Stupefaction! He thinks he has killed his child. He runs to the toy that still lies inert and, seized by a violent despair, tries to bring it back to life.

In vain. Pierrot then tries to kill himself too. He hesitates over various means of death, poison, a noose, etc. He stabs himself with a saber; the blade goes in and out his sleeve. Then he gets a gun, unhooks the mirror from the wall, sets it against the carafe, stands in a good position to see himself, his image appearing in the mirror. The shot rings out and Pierrot falls, thinking himself dead. When he comes to, he flees the theater of his crime, boards a boat, is taken with seasickness, shipwrecks in the middle of the most terrifying storm, swims to safety and collapses, exhausted, on a desert island.

Again he falls asleep. But this time his awakening will be better. The nightmare has disappeared; it lingers only as a light headache that the first smile of his little girl will dissipate when Pierrot, fully recovered to himself, runs to give her the newly found doll.

== See also ==
- Mime artist
- Pantomime
