= Gabriel Tyr =

French painter (1817–1868)

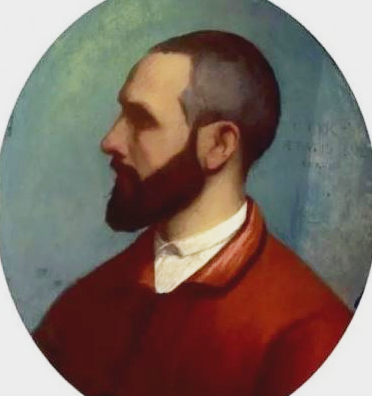
Self-portrait (1855)

Gabriel Tyr (19 February 1817, Saint-Pal-de-Mons – 16 February 1868, Saint-Étienne) was a French painter of portraits, both secular and religious. The latter were influenced by the Nazarene movement.

== Biography ==
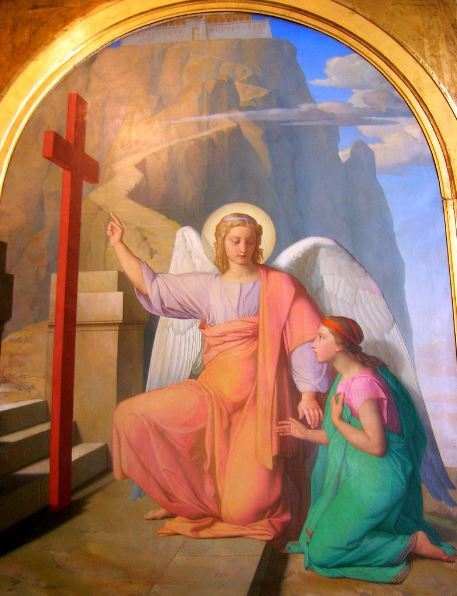
The Guardian Angel

His father, Jean Tyr (1790-1851), was a mason. Despite his financially modest background, he was able to enroll at the École Nationale Supérieure des Beaux-arts de Lyon in 1833, at the age of sixteen. He was awarded the Golden Laurel for his portrait of a sleeping child in 1837. This prize enabled him to enter the École des Beaux-Arts in Paris, where he studied with Victor Orsel. His first major project, frescoes at the Église Notre-Dame-de-Lorette, was performed in collaboration with Orsel.

In 1840 his son, Hector Gabriel, was born from a relationship with Marie Duc, who became his wife in 1847. Hector often served as his model.

He held his first exhibit at the Salon in 1843. Following the February Revolution, he received an order from Charles Blanc, Director of the department for the Visual Arts at the Ministry of the Interior. The resulting work was Le Christ Mort (The Dead Christ), a view of Jesus' head against a background of golden fabric. This was praised by the author and art critic, Théophile Gautier, and was the start of a lifelong friendship. He was then called to Lyon to complete a painting at the Basilique Notre-Dame de Fourvière that had been left unfinished by the death of his teacher, Orsel.

He chose to remain and, from 1850, most of his painting was done there. He also worked in Saint-Étienne and Puy-en-Velay, leaving the area occasionally to participate in exhibits; notably the Exposition Universelle of 1855. In addition to painting, he designed the stained glass windows at the Église de Saint-Louis in Saint-Étienne. At the time of his death, he had just received a commission to decorate the cathedral in Puy-en-Velay.

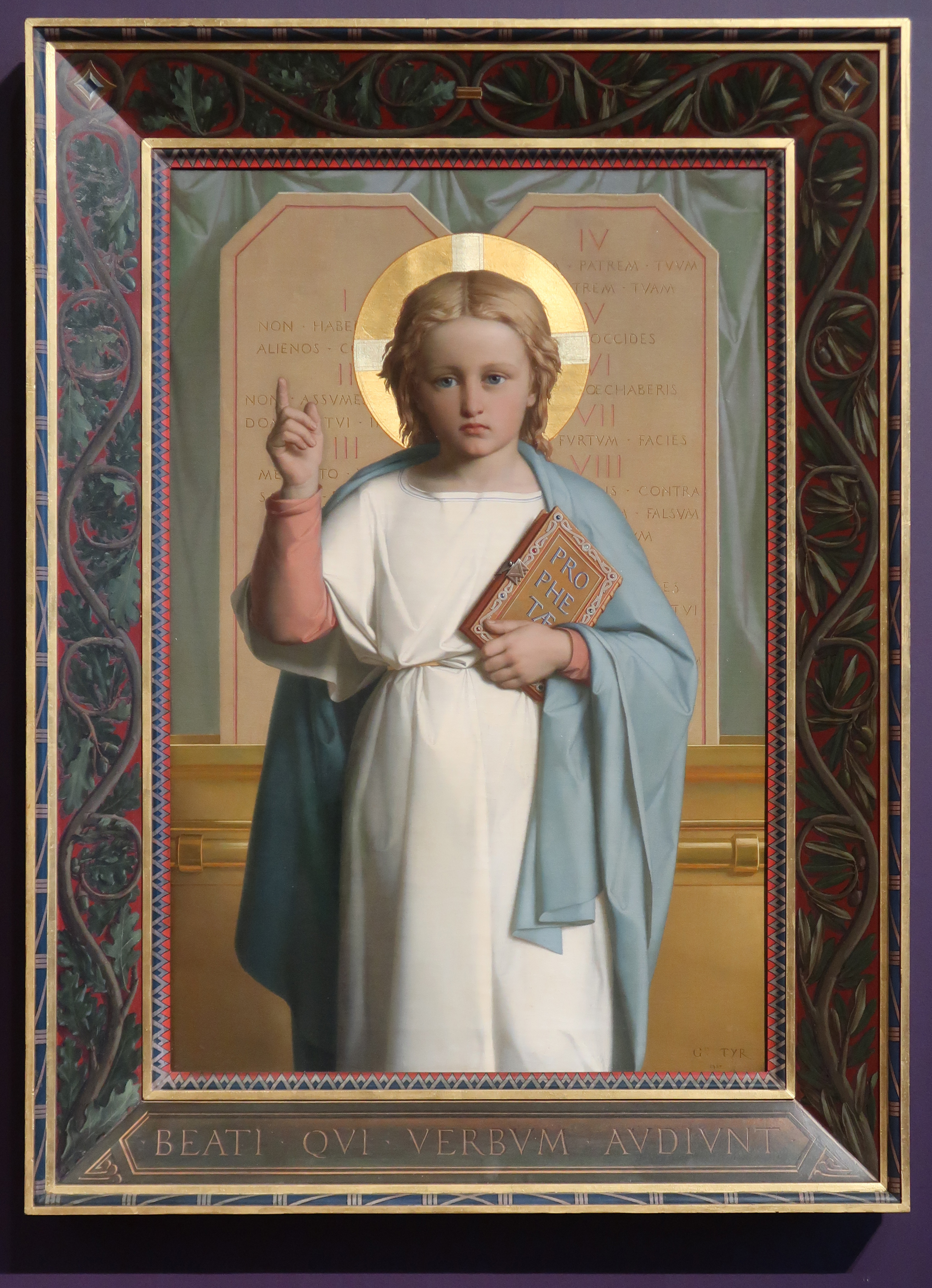
Christ the Child, Teaching

Much of his non-religious work is in private collections, having been sold to cover his debts. One of the largest public collections is at the Musée Crozatier.
