= Alphonse Périn =

French painter (1798–1874)

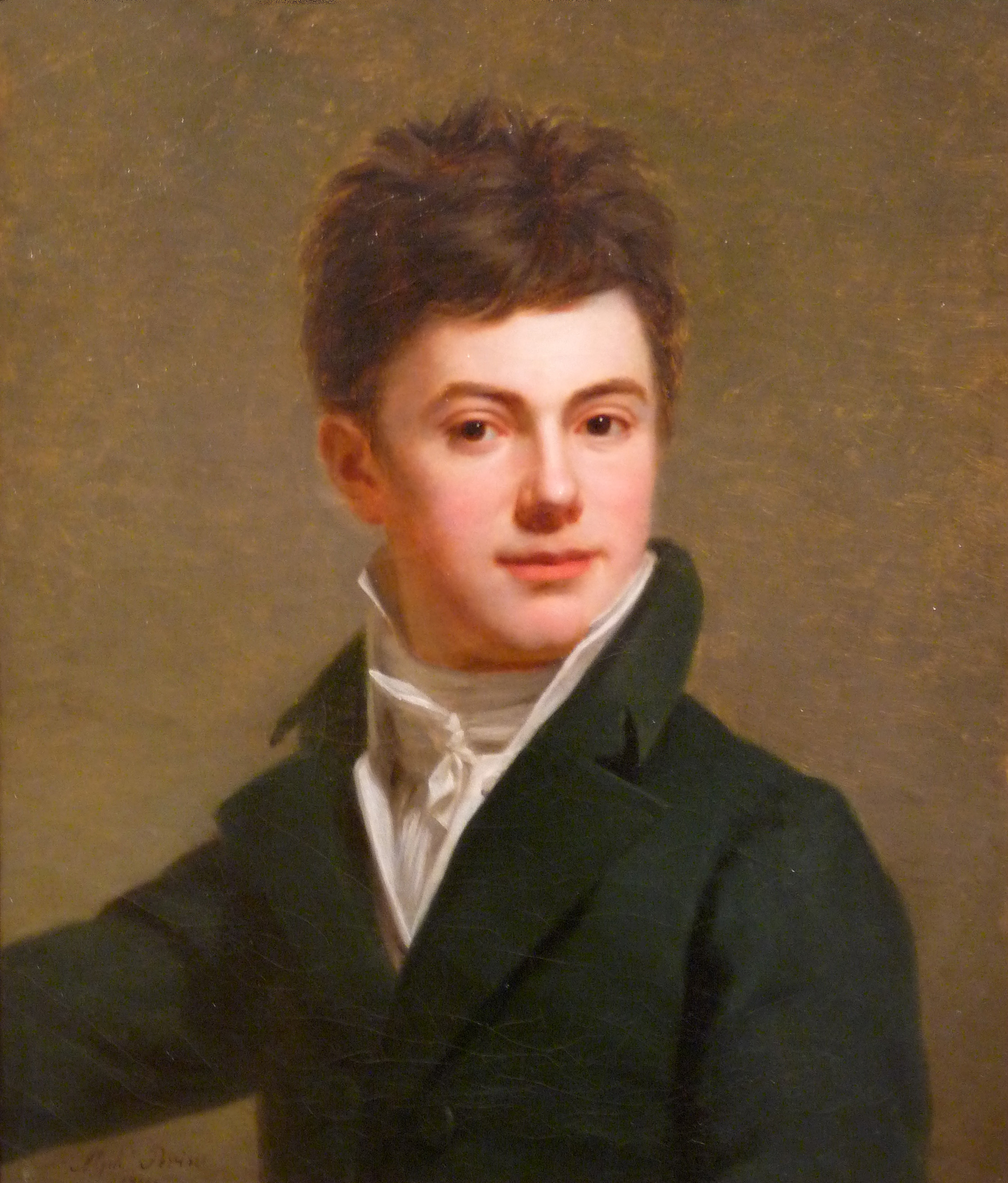
Self-portrait (before 1825)

Alphonse Henri Périn (12 May 1798, Reims – 6 October 1874, Paris) was a French painter and lithographer. His early paintings were devoted to history and architecture, but he later focused on figures.

== Biography ==
His father was the painter Lié Louis Périn-Salbreux. In 1817, he entered the École des beaux-arts de Paris, where he studied in the workshops of Pierre-Narcisse Guérin and Jean-Victor Bertin.

In 1821, he was awarded the Prix de Rome for historical painting. He lived in Rome for nine years altogether, and often collaborated with Victor Orsel at the French Academy. This influenced him to devote himself to figure studies, rather than history. In 1827, he sent his first works to Paris, for exhibition at the Salon. He was awarded a second-class medal.

He returned to France in 1830. Three years later, he painted several murals in the Chapel of the Eucharist at the church of Notre-Dame-de-Lorette. They were created with the assistance of his friend, Orsel, and Michel Dumas, a student of Ingres. They are now considered to be his major work. His late works consisted almost entirely of drawings and lithographs.

In 1854 he was named a Knight in the Order of Léopold and the Legion of Honor. His last exhibit at the Salon was in 1859.

Sketches of the Apostles at the Last Supper,
for the murals at Notre-Dame-de-Lorette
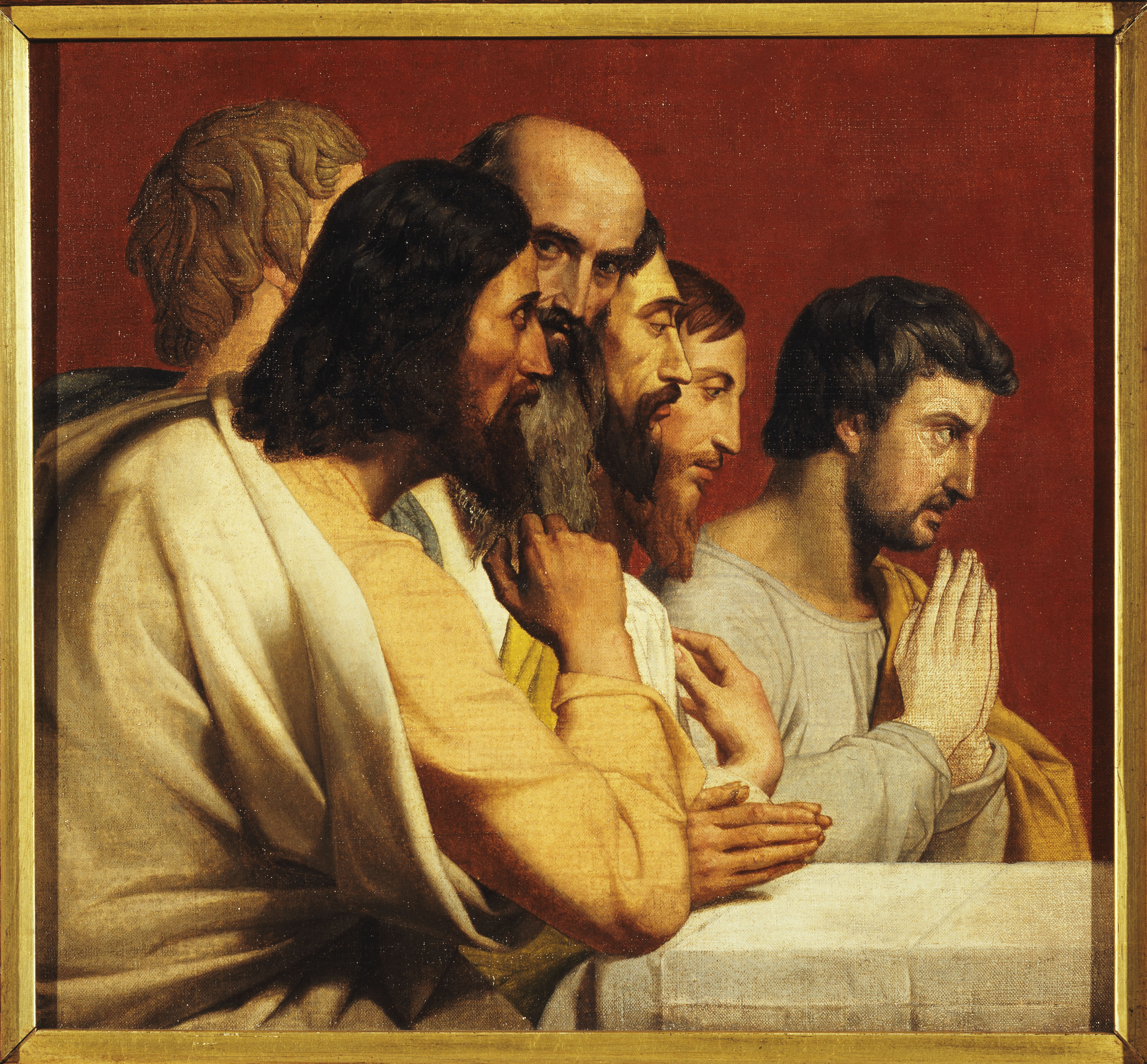
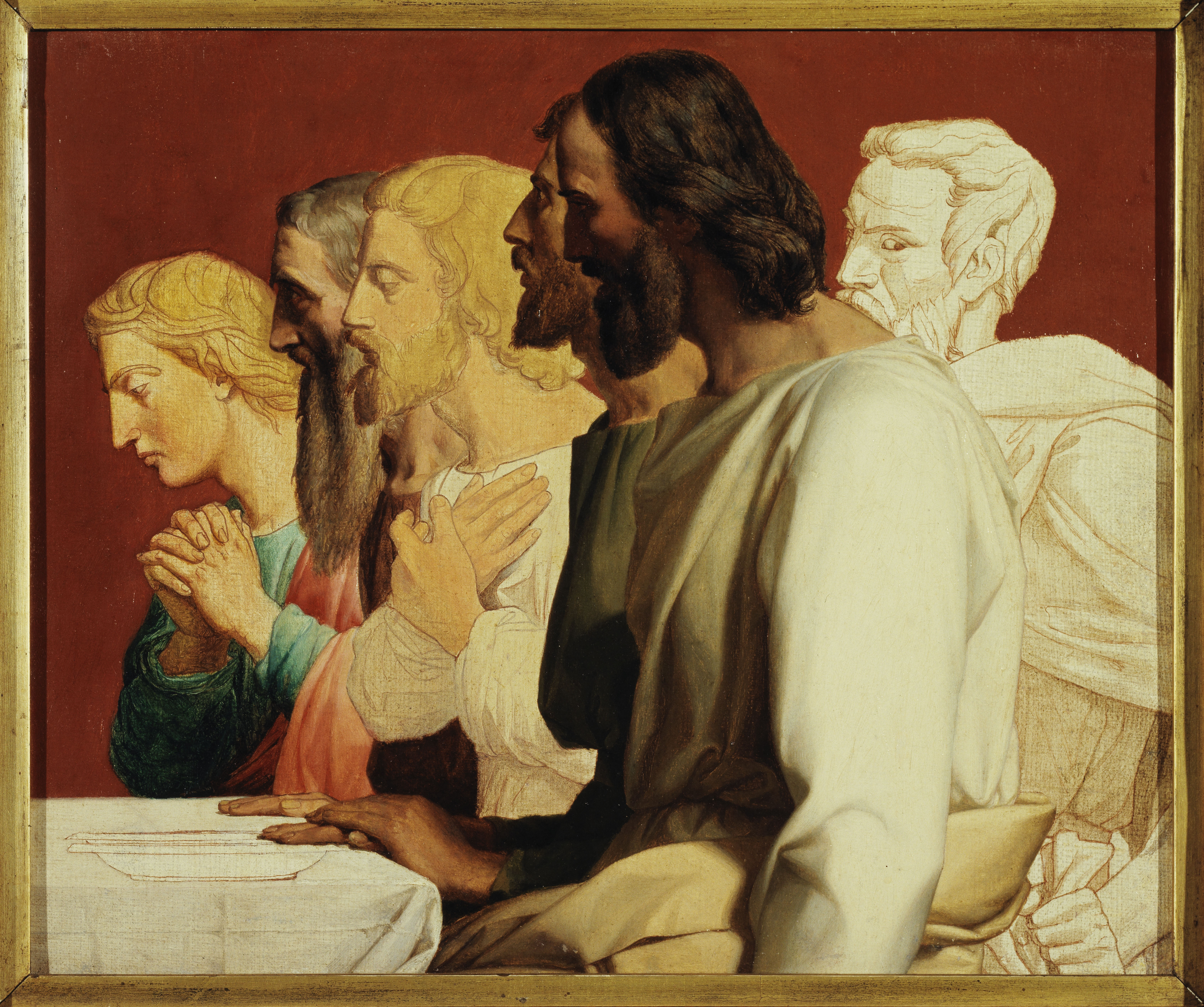

In addition to painting he wrote Le sculpteur suédois Fogelberg (E. Chunot, 1855), and Œuvres diverses de Victor Orsel (Rapilly, 1852–1878, 2 volumes), which was completed by his son Félix.
