= Victor Orsel =

French painter (1795–1850)

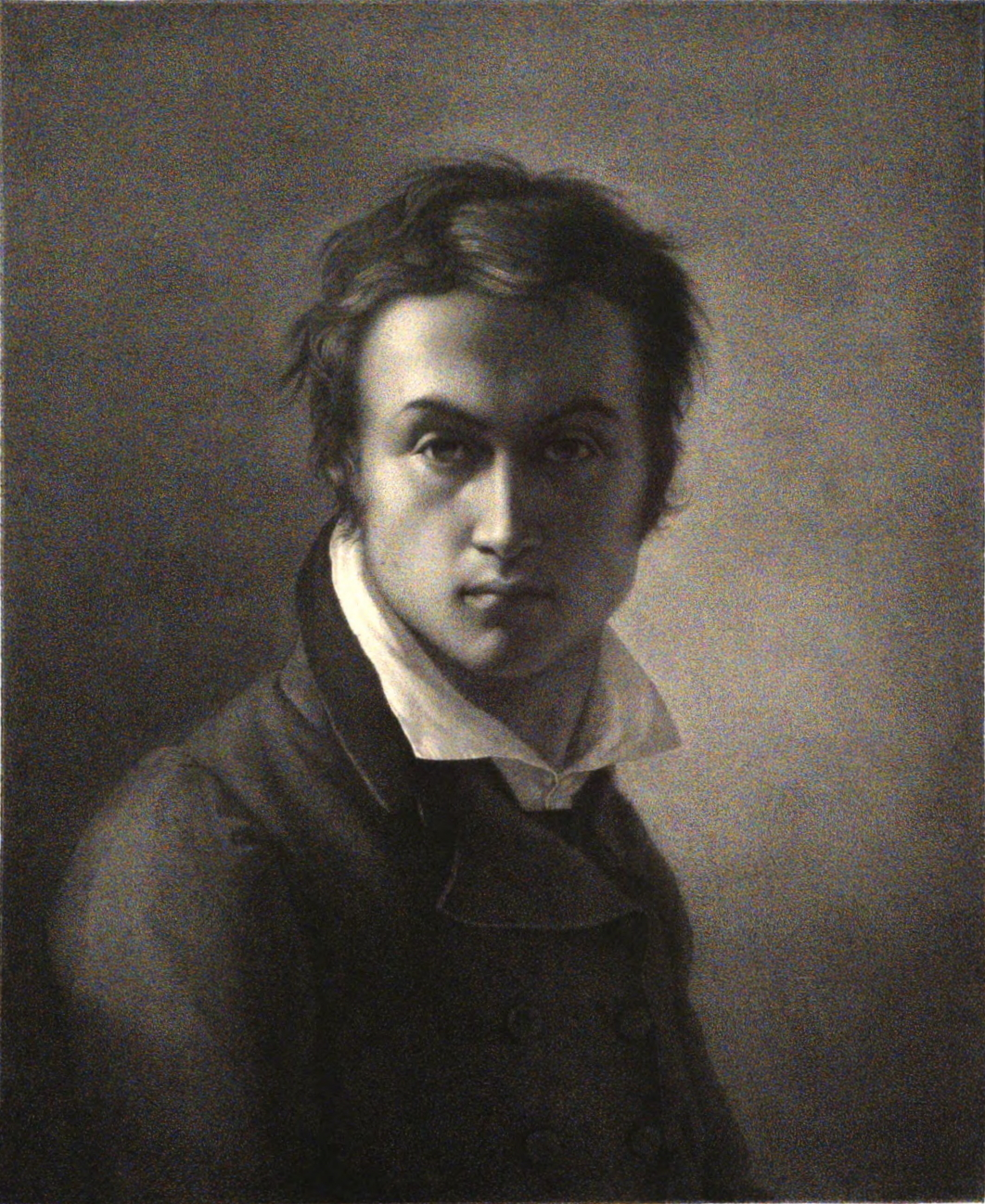
Self-portrait (date unknown)

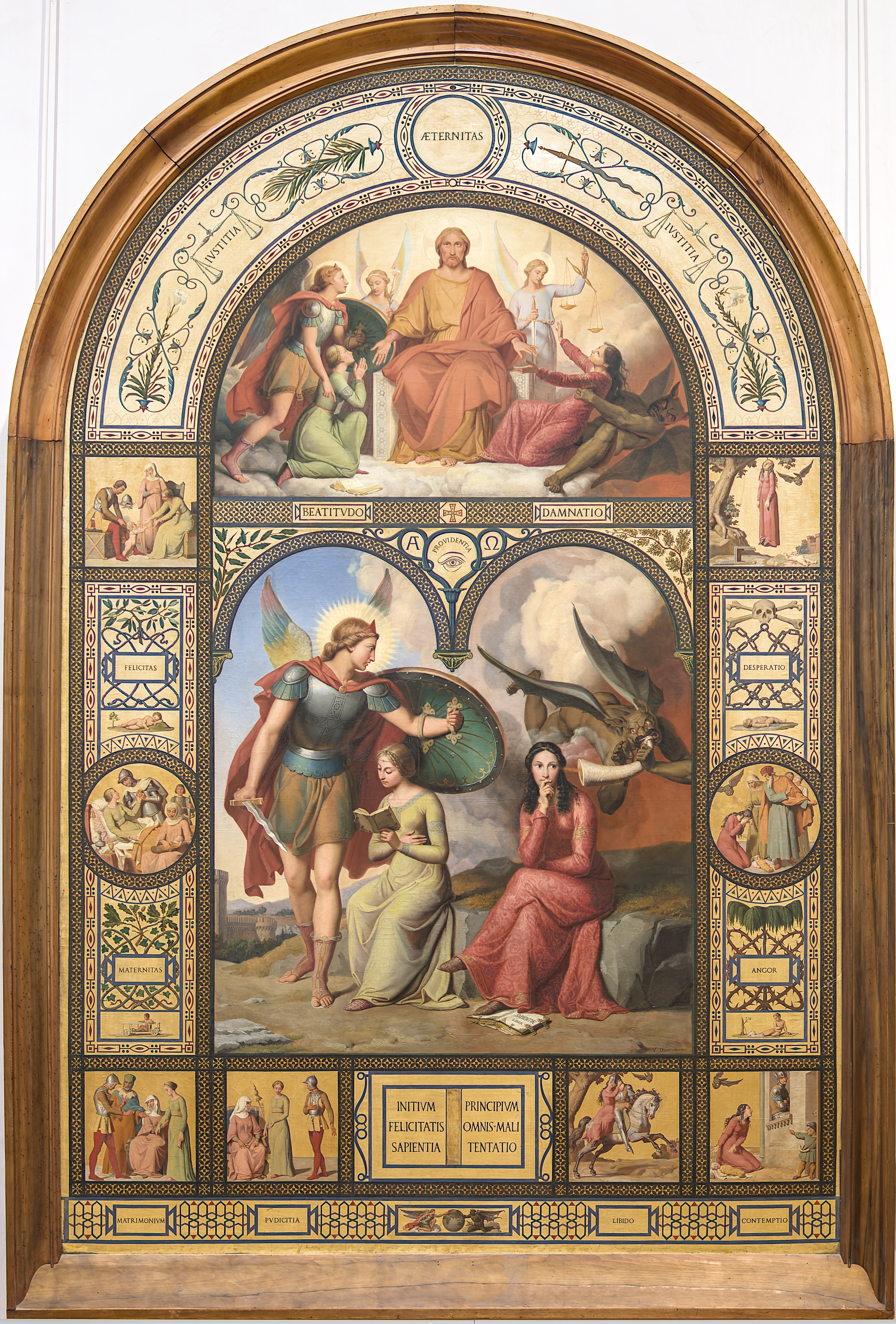
Good and Evil (French - Le Bien et le Mal), begun in Rome in 1829 and completed in Paris in 1832

André Jacques Victor Orsel (25 May 1795 – 1 November 1850) was a French painter; primarily of religious subjects.

== Biography ==
He was born in Oullins to an old merchant family of Dauphiné. His father, Jacques Orsel (1750–1800), was a gauze manufacturer in Lyon. He had three brothers: André-Jacques (1784–1868), who served as Mayor of Oullins and Tarare, Jean (1787–1847), a soldier, and Pierre Jean-Jacques (1791–1858), a writer.

He was successively a student of Pierre Révoil, at the École impériale des beaux-arts de Lyon (1809) and Pierre-Narcisse Guérin in Paris. In 1822, when Guérin was appointed Director of the French Academy in Rome, Orsel went with him. He remained there until 1830 and became associated with the Nazarene movement; especially Johann Friedrich Overbeck and his entourage. He also spent time copying works of Medieval art, whose style he incorporated into his own.

Back in France, the city of Paris commissioned him to decorate the church of Notre-Dame-de-Lorette. A friend from Rome, Alphonse Périn, worked with him and Michel Dumas acted as their assistant. Orsel chose to illustrate the Litanies of the Blessed Virgin Mary, divided into sixty paintings. He spent the last seventeen years of his life devoted to this project. He died in 1850 in Paris.

Among his best-known works are Good and Evil, at the Musée des Beaux-Arts de Lyon, and the Vow to Cholera, inspired by the cholera epidemic of 1832, which largely spared Lyon due, it is said, to the vows of its inhabitants. It was left incomplete and finished by his students in 1852. It was placed in the Basilique Notre-Dame de Fourvière in 1896.

His notable students included Louis Janmot, François-Frédéric Grobon, Gabriel Tyr and Louis Stanislas Faivre-Duffer.
