= Théâtre Déjazet =

Theatre in Paris, France

Coordinates: 48°51′58″N 2°21′52″E

- Folies-Mayer (1851); Folies-Concertantes (1853); Folies-Nouvelles (1854); Théâtre Déjazet (1859); Folies-Nouvelles (1871); Théâtre Déjazet (1872); Troisième Théâtre Français (1876); Folies-Nouvelles (1880); Théâtre Déjazet (1880-?); Le France (cinéma) (1939-1976); Théâtre Libertaire de Paris (1986-1992?)
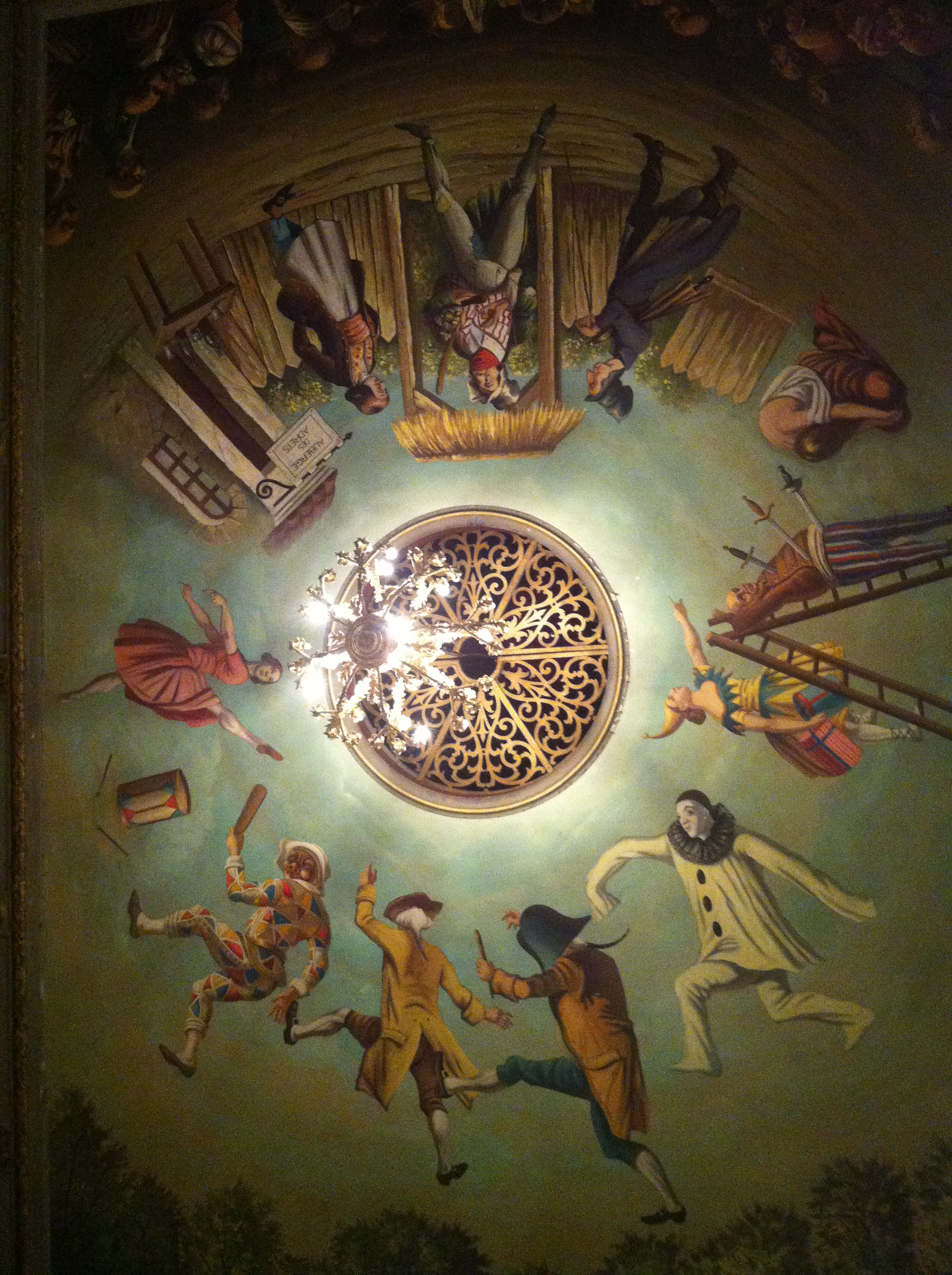
- An image of Théâtre Déjazet
- Interactive map of Théâtre Déjazet
- Address: 41 Boulevard du Temple; Paris; France
- Capacity: 600

Construction
- Opened: 1851

Website
- www.dejazet.com

The Théâtre Déjazet (French pronunciation: [teɑtʁ deʒazɛ]) is a theatre on the boulevard du Temple (popularly known as the 'boulevard du crime') in the 3rd arrondissement of Paris, France. Théâtre Déjazet is the only theatre surviving on the boulevard du Temple, not destroyed by Georges-Eugène Haussmann.

== Founding ==
The Théâtre Déjazet was founded in 1770 by Comte d'Artois who later was crowned Charles X.

== Des Folies-Mayer aux Folies-Nouvelles (1851-1859) ==
It was then closed down and not reopened until 1851. At that time it became a café-concert called the Folies-Mayer, on the site of a former jeu de paume (tennis court). It was converted into the Folies-Concertantes in 1853, and reopened as the Folies-Nouvelles on 21 October 1854.

Under the direction of the operetta composer Hervé from 1854 to 1856, it became a theatre for one-act spectacles-concerts with premieres of Hervé's La Perle de l'Alsace (1854), Un Compositeur toqué (1854), La Fine fleur de l'Andalousie (1854), Agamemnon, ou Le Chameau à deux bosses (1856), and Vadé au cabaret (1856). Several of Auguste Pilati's works received their first performance at the Théâtre des Folies-Nouvelles, including Jean le Sot (1856), Une Devinette (1856), Trois Dragons (1857), L'Ile de Calypso (1857), Peau d'âne (1858), Ignace le retors (1858)

One of Jacques Offenbach's first works, the anthropophagie musicale Oyayaye, ou La Reine des îles was also performed there (1855), and two opérettes, Delibes's Deux sous de charbon (1856), and Lecocq's Huis-Clos (1859). The mime Paul Legrand also regularly performed there between 1853 and 1859. The Folies-Nouvelles closed on 1 September 1859.

== Le théâtre Déjazet (1859-1939) ==
It reopened with the name Théâtre Déjazet on 27 September 1859 under the direction of the actress Virginie Déjazet. She managed it with her son Joseph Eugène Déjazet, until 1870. The theatre closed on 1 June 1870, becoming the Folies-Nouvelles again in 1871 and back to Théâtre Déjazet in 1872. It was known as the Troisième Théâtre Français from 1876 to 1880, when it reverted to Folies-Nouvelles for two months, before finally becoming the Théâtre Déjazet again on 17 September 1880.

== Cinema (1939-1976) ==
In 1976, the Société d'exploitation d'art cinéma cinéma, chaired by Jean Bouquin, former fashion designer and founder of the Théâtre Campagne-Première on Rue Campagne-Première, bought the building lease, with the building ownership by the Banque de France. Its rehabilitation as a theatre is undertaken.

== Déjazet Music-hall (1977-1986) ==
Administratively closed on November 29, 1977, then again on 11 May 1981 by the security commissions, Jean Bouquin transfers lease-management to a French clown company, Les Macloma, who obtain an authorization to reopen them under condition, on March 22, 1983.

== Le Théâtre libertaire de Paris, TLP-Déjazet (1986-1992) ==
Radio Libertaire venue.

== Live Performance venue (since 1995) ==
From 2009 to 2011, the theatre hosted the weekly seminar of the psychoanalyst Jacques-Alain Miller.
