= Perin Jamsetjee Mistri =

- Born: 1913
- Died: 1989 (aged 75–76)
- Education: Croydon High School, Sir Jamsetjee Jejeebhoy School of Art
- Occupation: Architect

Perin Jamsetjee Mistri (1913–1989) was an Indian architect and the first woman to qualify as an architect in India.

== Early life and family ==
Perin Jamshedji Mistri was born into an illustrious Parsi family of engineers and master builders, originally from Navsari. Her father, eminent city architect and engineer, Jamshedji Pestonji Mistri, founded the architectural firm Mistri & Bhedwar (later Ditchburn, Mistri & Bhedwar), which built the Art Deco Metro Cinema at Marine Lines, the HSBC bank building at Fort, the Colaba and Cuffe Parade Sea walls, the Taraporevala Mansion at Cuffe Parade and the first runway of the Mumbai Airport. Perin Mistri's younger brother, architect Minocher 'Minoo' Mistri, was one of the founders of the Indian art and architectural publication, Marg.

Following an early education in Gujarati in Bombay, she became a boarder at Miss Kimmin's High School in Panchgani and moved to England at the age of 10, completing her education from the Croydon High School. When she returned to Bombay, she enrolled at the Sir Jamsetjee Jejeebhoy (J.J.) School of Art and obtained her diploma in architecture in 1936. She joined her father's firm M/s. Mistri and Bhedwar in 1937, where she practiced for almost half a century as partner before she died in 1989.

== Career ==
One of Perin's first major works, and one of the few to survive, was Sir Behramji Karanjia's airy, Art Deco bungalow at Carmichael Road. Her other works included public, residential and industrial buildings, such as the Khatau mills in Borivali, and St. Stephen's Church at Cumballa Hill. At J.J, Perin is believed to have argued during a debate, "If men were compelled to do housekeeping, they would realise how avoiding cornices, carved ornament and other dust-traps was an advance." In 1936, when Perin made the news for securing a government diploma in Architecture, the first Indian woman to qualify, an anonymous letter in the Times of India praised the 23-year-old for stepping "out" of her home for the benefit of those women whose lives are spent "in" the home. "A woman architect would not make the mistake, I am sure, as the architect of the building I live in has done, of thinking that families have stopped having babies," wrote Housewife, adding that her "expensive" house in a "first-class neighbourhood" lacked even "the tiniest verandah" for her to air her kids' clothes. Perin's first bungalow on Carmichael Road with its deep verandahs and long balconies must have pleased the nameless mother.

Perin's interests ranged from the piano to hockey, gardening and the study of snakes in the Haffkine's institute in Bombay. She married businessman Ardeshir Bhiwandiwalla and moved to Pali Hill in Bandra.

== See also ==
- List of women architects
