= Catherine Christian =

English novelist

- Born: Mamie Mühlenkamp; 22 June 1901; Chelsea, London, England, United Kingdom
- Died: 12 Nov 1985
- Education: Croydon High School
- Occupation: Novelist
- Writing career
- Genres: Arthurian, Children's literature

Catherine Christian (22 June 1901 – 12 November 1985) was an English novelist, known for her children's books and retellings of Arthurian legend. She is classified as having produced 45 works in 85 publications in two languages (English and French) and with 1,019 library holdings. She was also involved with the Girl Guide movement and published several books for girls in the "Ranger" series under the pen name of Patience Gilmour.

== Early life ==
Catherine Christian was born on 22 June 1901 in Chelsea, London, England, the daughter of a German father, Christian John Mühlenkamp, and an English mother, Catherine Harriett (née Ellett, born in Wandsworth in 1873). Christian and Catherine had married in Wandsworth in 1899. Her birth was registered as Mamie Muhlenkamp, but the family may have changed their surname during World War I. There is no legal evidence for this name change and Mamie remained "Mulenkamp" in her school records, although later became known as Catherine Mary Christian. She is recorded as Catherine Mary Christian on her death certificate.

Mamie attended Croydon High School for girls between 25 September 1911 and 25 June 1920, initially at the site in Purley and then from September 1914 at the main school. In 1919 her school records show that she achieved Senior Oxford Class III with subjects English, History, Religious Knowledge, French, German, Mathematics and Botany.

After leaving school she returned to live at home.

== Later life ==
Christian was a published author during the period 1930 to 1970. She edited The Guide journal from 1939 to 1945. She also made contributions to The Guider, a publication being produced at the same time and edited by her friend Margaret Tennyson. After the war, Christian moved to Devon and was Curator of the Salcombe National Trust Museum (Overbeck's).

Christian was involved in the Guide International Service (GIS), and assisted Olga Drahonowska-Małkowska, a former Polish Chief Guide and founder of scouting in Poland, who ran the Polish Children's Home at Hawson Court in Buckfastleigh, Devon.

Christian died on 12 November 1985.

== Bibliography ==
=== As Catherine Christian ===
- L'aube de la Liberté, publisher unknown
- Greenie and the Pink 'Un: a Girl Guide story, illustrated by Gordon Browne, published by "Every Girl's Paper" Office, c1925
- The Luck of the Scallop Shell, published by Brown, Son & Ferguson Limited, 1929
- Syringa Street, published London, 1930
- Cherries in Search of a Captain, Illustrated by Comerford Watson, published by Blackie & Son, c1935
- The Legions Go North, published by Cassell & Co., 1935
- The Wrong Uncle Jim, published by Edward Arnold & Co., 1935
- Great Stories of All Time, illustrated by Alfred Garth Jones, published by Hutchinson, c1936
- Baker's Dozen: thirteen stories for girls, published by The Girl's Own Paper, 1937
- The Marigolds Make Good, published by Blackie & Son, 1937
- A Schoolgirl from Hollywood, illustrated by Ernest Baker, published by Blackie & Son, 1939
- Diana Takes a Chance, illustrated by A A Nash, published London by Blackie & Son, 1940
- The Pharaoh's Secret, published by Lutterworth Press, 1940
- Harriet: The Return of Rip Van Winkle, published by C. Arthur Pearson, 1941
- Harriet Takes The Field, published by Pearson, 1942
- The Kingfishers See It Through, illustrated by E. Spring-Smith, published by Blackie & Sons, 1942
- The School at Emerys End, published London by C Arthur Pearson, 1944
- The Silver Unicorn London, published by Hutchinson, 1946
- Phyllida's Fortune, published by George Newnes Ltd, 1947
- The Big Test: The Story of the Girl Guides in the World War, published by The Girl Guides Association, 1947
- The Seventh Magpie, illustrated by E. Spring-Smith, published by Blackie & Son. London, c1948
- Sally and the Sixpenny Pig (Read every day library), illustrated by Constance Marshall, published by Blackie, 1960
- A Stranger Passed, published by G.P. Putnam's Sons, 1961
- Sidney Seeks Her Fortune, published by Peal Press, 1965
- Sally Joins the Patrol, published by Peal Press, 1966
- The Pendragon, published by Knopf, 1978 and MacMillan, 1981 (as The Sword and the Flame); Warner, 1984

=== As Patience Gilmour ===
- Three’s a Company, 1935
- The Seven Wild Swans: A Story for Rangers, published by Epworth Press, 1936
- The Quest of the Wild Swans, 1941
- The Cygnets Sail Out, 1943
