= Dorinda Neligan =

Irish-born English headmistress and suffragette

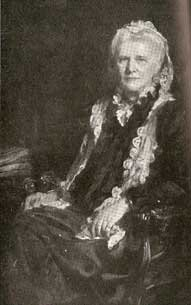
- Dorinda Neligan, by J.J. Shannon 1901
- Born: 9 June 1833; Cork, Ireland
- Died: 17 July 1914 (aged 81); Croydon, England
- Occupation: Headmistress
- Employer: Croydon High School
- Known for: suffrage activism

Dorinda Neligan (9 June 1833 – 17 July 1914) was an Irish born English headmistress and suffragette.

== Life ==
Neligan was born in Cork in 1833. She was the fifth child of Lieutenant Thomas Neligan. Despite having a soldier as a father she objected to war. She was educated at home, in Paris and Germany and she went on to work as a "finishing governess". She then did notable work leading nursing at the siege of Metz during the Franco Prussian War from 1870 to 1871.

She learned French and German and taught French, and Neligan was the founding head of Croydon High School in 1874, where she remained for 27 years. The school was backed by Maria Georgina Grey and was part of the Girls' Public Day School Company and it opened with 88 pupils. She had grabbed some ivy from the school walls for the girls to wear in their hair to be 'distinctive' at the first girls day schools' company prize giving. She lived (as recorded in the 1881 Census), as head of the household of women (presumably staff) at the school in St. Leonard's Lodge, Wellesly Road.

And Neligan became the vice-president of the Association of Headmistresses (of independent girls schools) in 1893.

After she retired she took an interest in women's suffrage, in June 1909 going to a protest at the House of Commons. And she had had a silver teapot seized by officials, after she refused to pay local taxes in protest at having no representation. Becoming a member of the Women's Tax Resistance League, her regular 'refusal' behaviour became known in the local press headlines: 'Miss Heligan's Hardy Annual' or 'No Surrender'. She was also said to have been willing to be imprisoned, even if subscribing to the WSPU became illegal, but she never was imprisoned, although she was arrested in 1910.

== Black Friday ==
On 18 November 1910, Neligan joined a deputation led by Emmeline Pankhurst to petition the Prime Minister Asquith. The delegates included Hertha Ayrton, Dr Elizabeth Garrett Anderson, Dr Louisa Garrett Anderson, Anne Cobden-Sanderson, and Princess Sophia Duleep Singh. The delegation was met by the uniformed police and hooligans (who may have been police in plain clothes). There was evidence of their brutality but the government refused to investigate. The day became known as "Black Friday" There was also evidence that Neligan had assaulted a constable, but no charges were made.

== Death and recognition ==
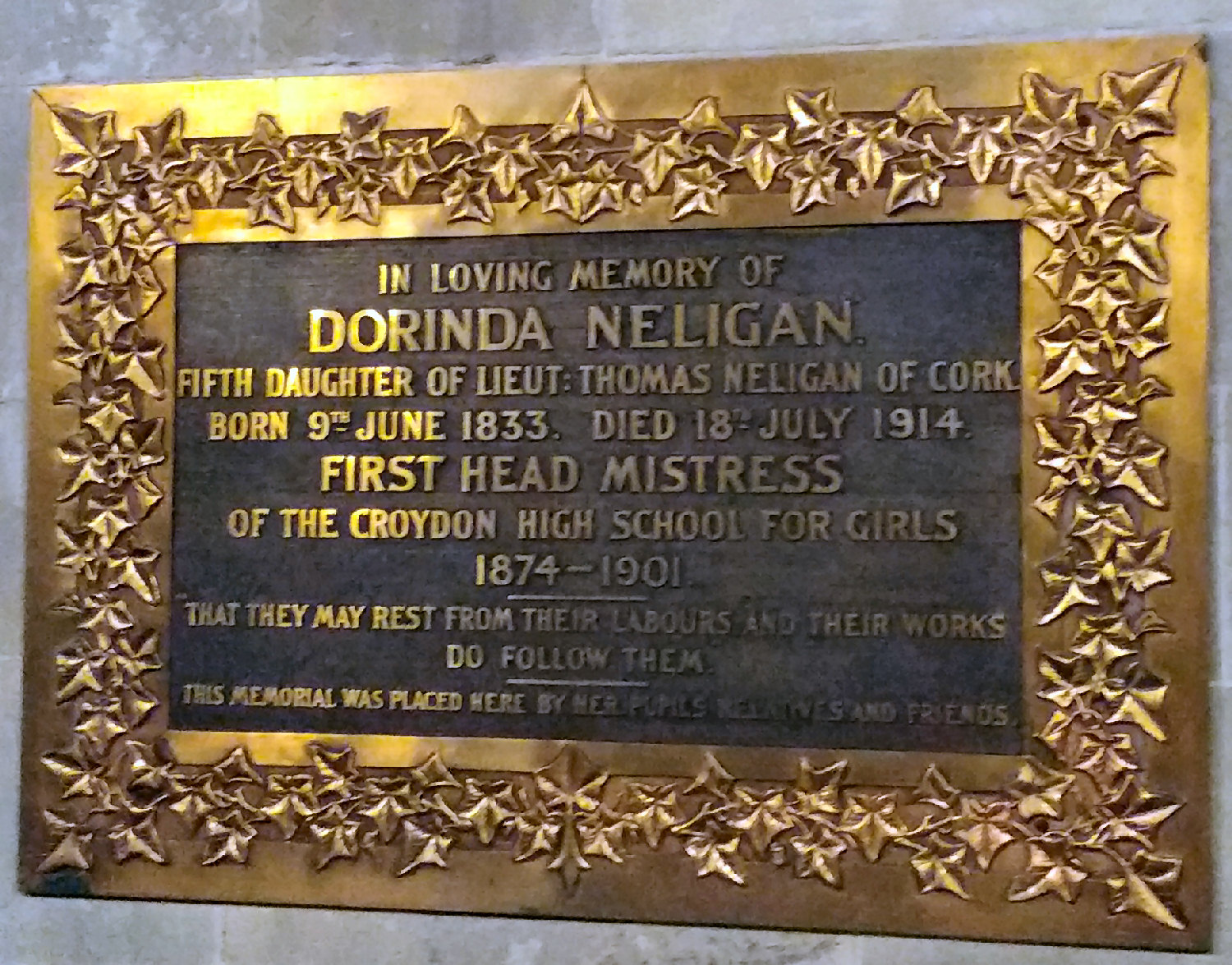
Dorinda Neligan memorial in Croydon Minster

Neligan died at her home in Croydon in 1914, not seeing the result of her efforts, that some women were to get the vote in 1918. Her obituary was published in the Women's Freedom League (WFL) newspaper, The Vote, A wreath was sent to her funeral from the WSPU leader, Emmeline Pankhurst "With love and remembrance for a brave veteran, whose life was spent in noble work for women and for the race," along with flowers from the local WSPU branch and a wreath from the WFL. A memorial plaque is in Croydon Minster, and at the centenary of (some) women's franchise, the Croydon Central M.P., Sarah Jones had described Neligan as one of the women who offer inspiration to young women of today. And the Croydon Museum project created a banner with her name and the Croydon High School ivy logo image, and the words 'Veteran Suffragette'.
