= Alfred Garth Jones =

English artist and illustrator (1872–1955)

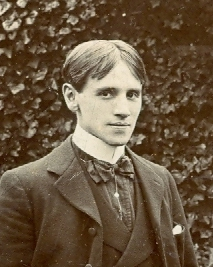
- Born: Alfred Jones; 10 August 1872; Manchester, England
- Died: 6 July 1955 (aged 82); Sidcup, England
- Known for: Illustration

Alfred Garth Jones (1872–1955) was an English artist and illustrator who worked mainly in woodcut, pen and ink line art drawing and watercolour.

== Early life ==
Alfred Jones was born in Hulme, Manchester in 1872, the son of Thomas Jones (b1844) and Mary McCullock (b1846). At that time, Thomas Jones was a mechanical draughtsman although he later progressed to become an Engineering Lecturer.

In the United Kingdom Census 1881, Alfred is listed (aged 8) with the rest of his family (Ada, Mary, Thomas, Alfred, Ernest, Robert, Maud and later Percy) which was resident in Moss Side, then a Manchester suburb. At age 18, Alfred was still living with his parents and was studying art in Manchester. It seems that within a few years he had moved to London in order to advance his career in the arts. This was most probably in order to become a student at the National Art Training School in South Kensington, an institution that would become the Royal College of Art in 1896.

The March 1901 edition of The Poster and Art Collector publication included an article entitled "Some Remarks on the Work of Alfred Garth Jones" (by The Editor). This describes how Jones continued his training by attending the Slade School of Fine Art as a pupil of Professor Fred Brown. He then extended his studies in Paris at the Académie Julian where he was directed by Jean-Joseph Benjamin-Constant and Jean-Paul Laurens, before returning to England in 1894.

On 15 December 1898 Alfred married Harriette Napier Osborne (a farmer's daughter b 10 December 1875 in Marden, Kent) at The Parish Church (now Chelsea Old Church) in the parish of St. Luke, Chelsea, London. The ceremony was attended by Alfred's father, Thomas, and by Harriette's mother, Lydia Napier Osborne (née Hardy). By the time of the 1901 United Kingdom census the couple were living on the King's Road, Chelsea.

In 1911, Alfred and Harriette were living in Wandsworth with their 5-year-old daughter, Barbara Garth Jones. The census of that year records that Harriette had by this time given birth to two children. Brian Garth Jones had been born in 1902 but had died aged four. The census forms in the United Kingdom were then required to be completed by the head of the household, for that individual address, and this document bears the name and signature "Alfred Garth Jones".

== Career ==
Alfred adopted the middle name Garth early in his career in order to distinguish himself from artists with a similar name. The reason for choosing this name is not known, but may have been influenced by the Welsh ancestry of his forefathers. His earlier works were signed A Garth Jones (or A G J), although later this was shortened to Garth Jones. Jones' illustrations were used in several notable publications around the start of the 20th century, including works by Tennyson, H. G. Wells, John Milton, Conan Doyle and Carmen Sylva.

In 1894, the first examples of Jones' illustrations appeared in "The Tournament of Love" by William Theodore Peters and "Fairy Tales from Classic Myths for boys and girls" by Charles H Smith.

Two years later, Jones edited The Beam, a bi-monthly magazine published by students of the National Art Training Schools. There were only three editions produced between January and May 1896.

From 1896 to nearly the end of 1899, Alfred was design master at the Lambeth School of Art.

In 1898, he produced a woodcut portrayal of the bound Samson in a collection of John Milton's poems.

By 1901, Jones' reputation was sufficient that he was selected, along with Harold Nelson, by Elisabeth of Wied (Queen Consort of Carol I of Romania) to illustrate the English edition of a book of verse (A Real Queen's Fairy Book, published by George Newnes Ltd) which she had written under the pen name of Carmen Sylva. In France at around the same time, Jérôme Doucet (1865–1957) chose Jones to be the illustrator for his "Contes de la Fileuse" (Tales of the Spinner). Doucet was noted for the care that he took in choosing his illustrators. This book contains 117 pen-drawings by Jones so that the November 1901 issue of The Studio reported that "It has fallen to the lot of Mr. Garth Jones to be more widely known in France than he is in his own country". Also in this year, Alfred, Lord Tennyson's In Memoriam was published with illustrations by Jones and he contributed to Queen Mab's Fairy Realm along with fellow illustrators Herbert Cole, H. R. Millar, Arthur Rackham and Reginald Savage.

Around 1902, Jones was associated with the Carlton Studio, one of the largest studios of commercial art in London at that time. During this period, along with Albert Angus Turbayne, he was of assistance to a number of Canadian book design artists who had joined Carlton in order to improve their skills.

In 1904, a mosaic portraying the Arts was designed by Jones and executed by the Bromsgrove Guild for incorporation into the pedimented gable of the new Hull School of Art, a listed building that still stands on Anlaby Road, Hull.

Jones designed the stained glass windows for the new Cardiff City Hall which was completed in 1906. Notable amongst these is the large arched window in the Council Chamber, dated 1905, which depicts "Dame Wales" and the commercial life of the Principality.

By 1910 to 1912 Jones was again teaching at the Lambeth School of Art, where he was described as the member of staff for decorative and illuminative design. The length of this tenure is not known.

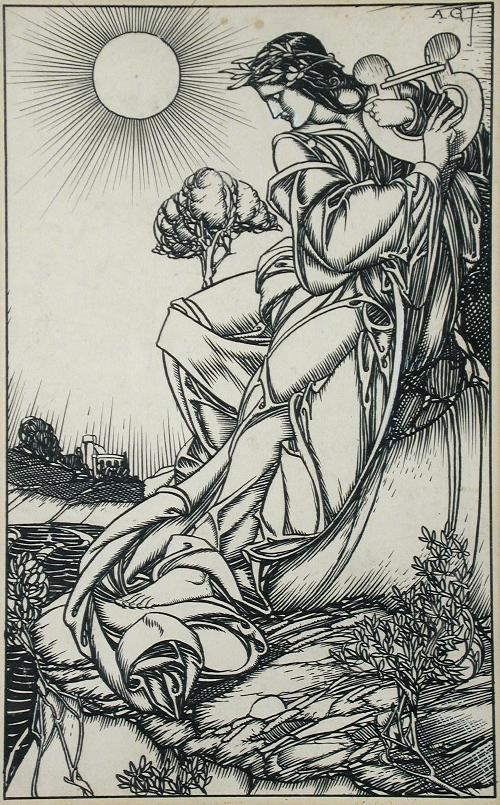
From Tennyson's In Memoriam. 'And linger weeping on the marge'.

In America, his illustrations for Henry van Dyke's short stories the Half-Told Tales appeared in the January to June 1912 issue of Scribner's Magazine. In October 1912, Charles Scribner's Sons published the first edition of Van Dyke's The Unknown Quantity, with artwork by various illustrators, of which Garth Jones was one. The book included Half-Told Tales and so it is likely that Jones' same illustrations and decorations were used.

The 19 May 1917 edition of the American newspaper The Independent included an advertisement for the Packard Twin-Six motor carriage, illustrated by Jones.

In 1921 Jones exhibited two works at the first annual exhibition of the Society of Graphic Art in Suffolk Street, London.

Scribner's Magazine for July to December 1925 showed Jones' work for an entry entitled The Two Selves by Elsa Barker (1869–1954), an American novelist and poet, born in Leicester, Vermont. However, by this time there are few other references to indicate that Jones' work was still being published, except for a few posters, such as The Bazaar for Collectors and Connoisseurs, from the 1920s.

Jones' paintings were used as front covers for several issues of Bibby's Annual, edited by Joseph Bibby of Liverpool, England, in the 1920s and also for the retrospect and epilogue edition in 1936.

== Later life and death ==
Although the commercial demand for his work seems to have declined in the years after World War I, Jones continued to produce art until the end of his life. In November 1939 he presented a dedicated watercolour as a wedding gift to his nephew Alan (the son of his younger brother Ernest) and Alan's bride, Peggy Holt. Similar paintings had already been produced to mark the marriages of each of his brother Ernest's children, as well as one for his unmarried sister Maud. Other works completed for the family include a number of bookplates, all titled "Ex Libris". Amongst these were plates for Ernest and other relatives, Joyce Holt, Eric Vlies and Olga Jones. In some cases the original print blocks still exist. Several of his watercolours and drawings are also retained within the family.

In 1943, Alfred wrote a letter from an address in Chadwell Heath, Essex to his younger brother Ernest on the subject of his nephew Philip's death in a flying accident whilst training pilots in the United States.

Barbara Garth Jones married Eric Hosmer in 1930 and they had daughters Patricia Mary (b1932) and Janet (b1936).

Harriette Napier Jones died in the Elizabeth Garrett Anderson Hospital, St. Pancras on 9 May 1946. Later Alfred went to live with his daughter Barbara and her family in Sidcup.

Alfred Garth Jones died of pneumonia on 6 July 1955 in Queen Mary's Hospital, Sidcup aged 82.

== Notable illustrated works ==
- The Tournament of Love, William Theodore Peters published by Brentano's, 1894.
- Fairy Tales from Classic Myths, by Charles H Smith published by John Heywood, Manchester, 1894.
- The Minor Poems of John Milton (George Bell & Sons, 1898).
- Contes de Haute-Lisse by Jérôme Doucet (impr. pour Bernoux et Cumin, Paris, 1899)
- The Poems of Robert Burns cover and frontispiece published by Simpkin, Marshall, Hamilton, Kent & Co. London, c1900.
- A Real Queen's Fairy Tales. Carmen Sylva (The Queen of Roumania) Davis and Company, Chicago, 1901.
- Front cover (Father Christmas), of The Ladies Field Magazine, Santa Claus Supplement, 30 November 1901.
- In Memoriam by Alfred, Lord Tennyson (George Newnes, 1901).
- The First Men in the Moon by H. G. Wells (Collins' Clear Type Press, 1901).
- Queen Mab's Fairy Realm. (London: George Newnes, 1901)
- Shakespeare's Tragedies William Shakespeare decorated endpapers (London : George Newnes Ltd., 1901).
- The Hound of the Baskervilles. Arthur Conan Doyle. (London: George Newnes, 1902). Front cover design.
- The Adventures Of Sherlock Holmes by Arthur Conan Doyle. (London: George Newnes, 1901). Front cover design.
- The Diary of Samuel Pepys, Esquire, F. R. S. By Samuel Pepys. Edited by Lord Braybrooke. (London: George Newnes Ltd.; New York: Charles Scribner's Sons. 1902) Frontispiece
- Knyght of the Towre (The Book of the Knight of the Tower): Book of Thenseygnementes and Techynge That the Knyght of the Towre Made to His Doughters by Landry Geoffroy De La Tour Chevalier. (London George Newnes Ltd, 1902)
- The Sketch Book by Washington Irving endpaper designs (George Newnes Limited, London, 1902)
- The Valley of Spiders by H. G. Wells which appeared in Pearson's Magazine in March 1903.
- Long Will, A Romance by Florence Converse (1903).
- The Banshee's Halloween by Herminie Templeton which appeared in McClure's Magazine in May 1903.
- The Shorter Works of Walter Savage Landor (London : George Newnes; New York : Charles Scribner's Sons, 1904) Wood-engraved title-page compartment and illustrated endpapers by Alfred Garth Jones.
- Contes de la Fileuse and Contes de Haute-Lisse by Jérôme Doucet (Ch Tallandier, Paris, 1900)
- Le Baiser Rouge by Jérôme Doucet (Edition Moderne-Librairie Ambert, Paris, c 1900)
- The Dramas and Satires of Byron (published in London by Simpkin, Marshall, Hamilton, Kent & Co., and in New York by Charles Scribner's Sons, c1900)
- Fairy tales from Tuscany by Isabella M Anderton (Published Arnold Fairbairns, London, 1907)
- The Unknown Quantity by Henry Van Dyke (Published by Scribners ~ 1912)
- Essays of Elia by Charles Lamb (Methuen, 1920)
- Men Like Gods by H. G. Wells (1923)
- Collins' Thin Paper Pocket 2/6 Editions of H. G. Wells (22 Novels in total), c. 1928–1932.
- I See All – The World's First Picture Encyclopedia edited by Arthur Mee (Edited at John Carpenter House, Issued by the Amalgamated Press at Fleetway House, London, c1930)
- Great Stories of All Time by Catherine M Christian (Hutchinson Circa 1937)
- The Poetical Works of Percy Bysshe Shelley by PERCY BYSSHE SHELLEY; illustrated by ALFRED GARTH JONES (Simpkin, Marshall, Hamilton, Kent & Co. Ltd. 1 January 1920) ASIN: B0006DH5I6
- Life at the Mermaid by J. C. Squire, Collins' Clear-Type Press, London & Glasgow. circa 1920
- The Letters of Charles Lamb, Simpkin, Marshall, Hamilton, Kent & Co. Ltd. circa 1920
- The Sun Princess Fairy Tales, Juvenile Productions Ltd. 1936.

== Gallery ==
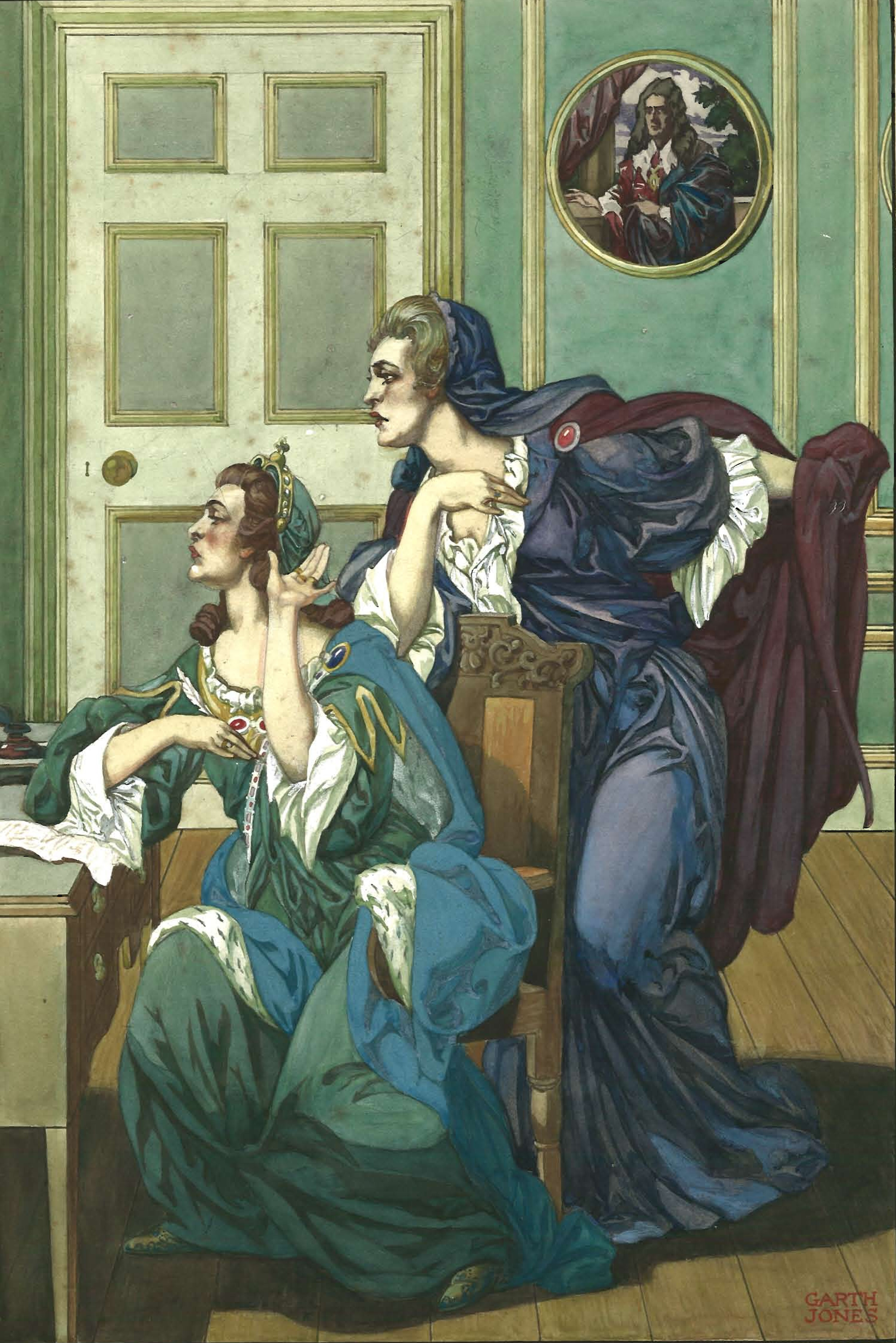
Queen Anne dismisses the Duchess of Marlborough at Kensington Palace A.D.1710.

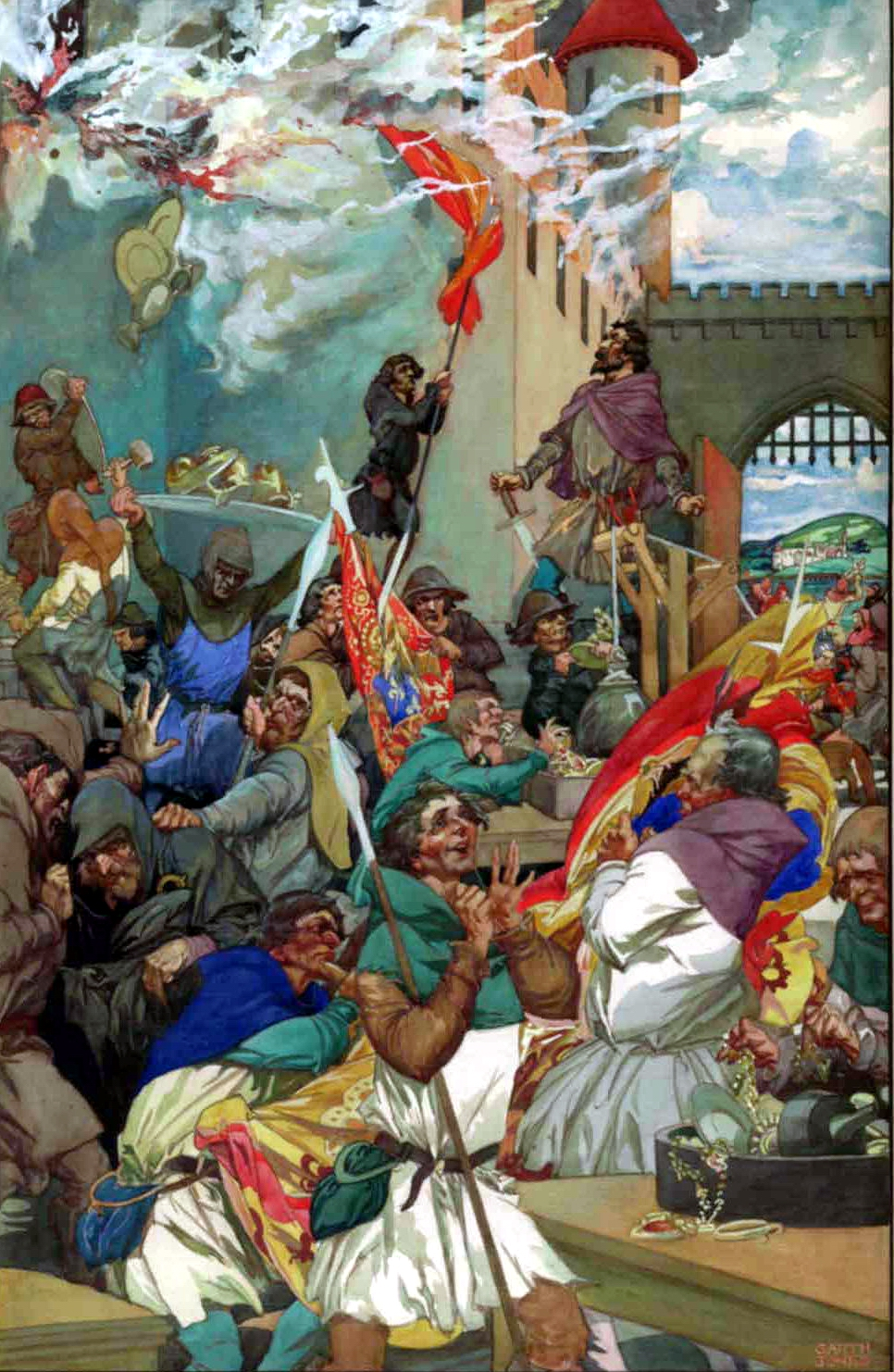
The Peasants (Wat Tyler) burn Palace of the Savoy. A.D. 1381.

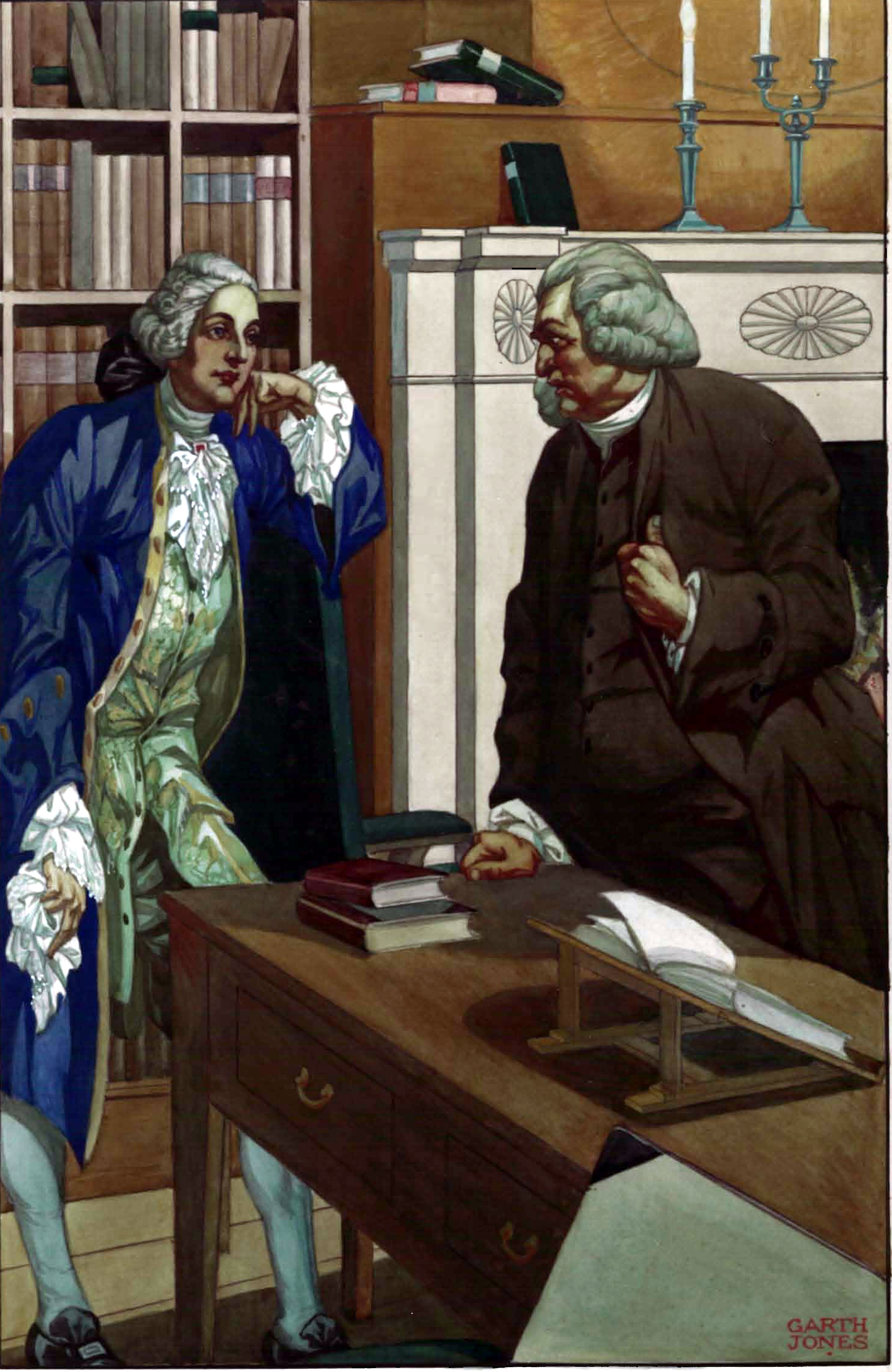
Dr. Johnson meets George III at Buckingham House. A.D. 1767.

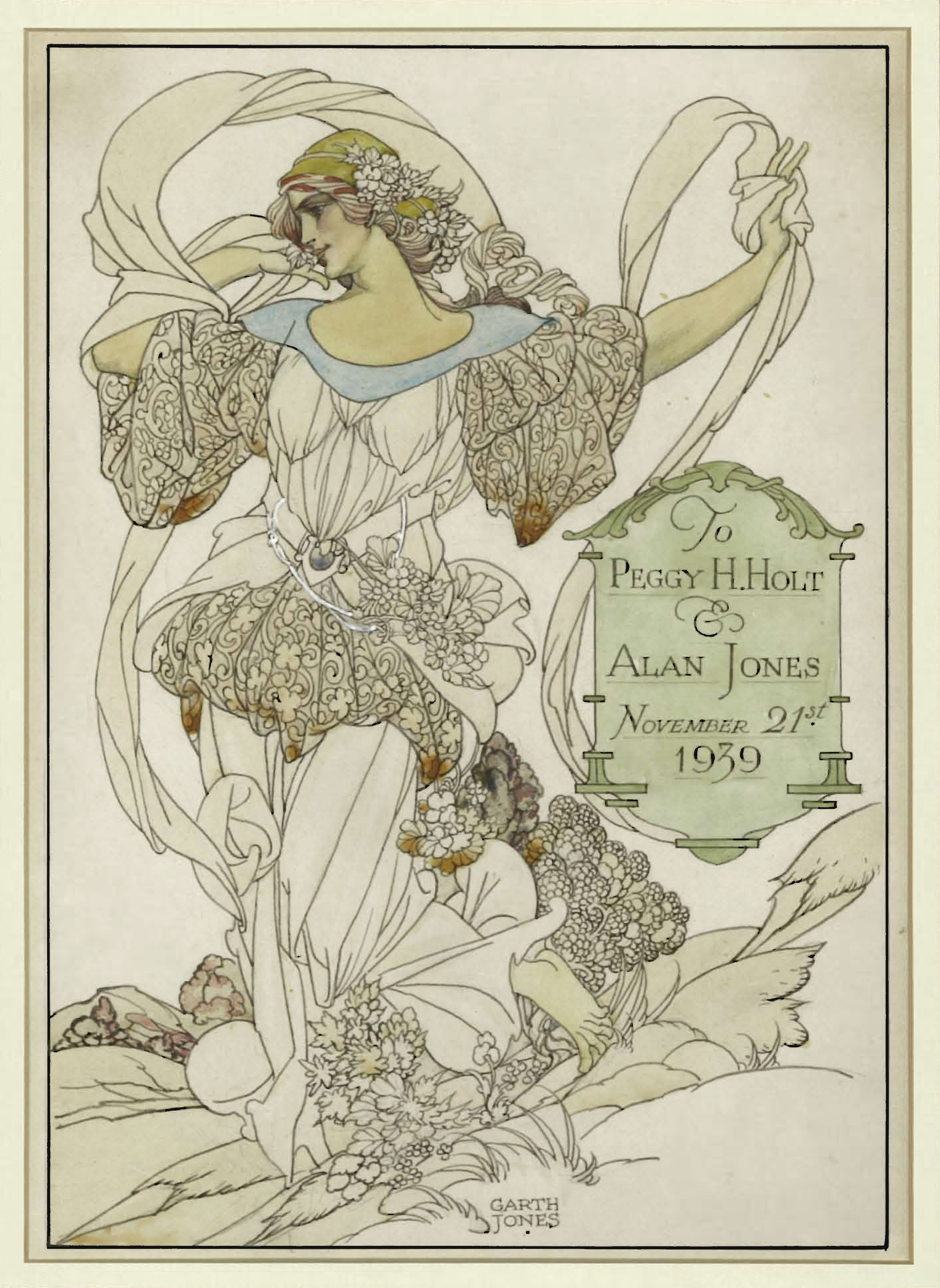
To Peggy H. Holt & Alan Jones 21 November 1939.

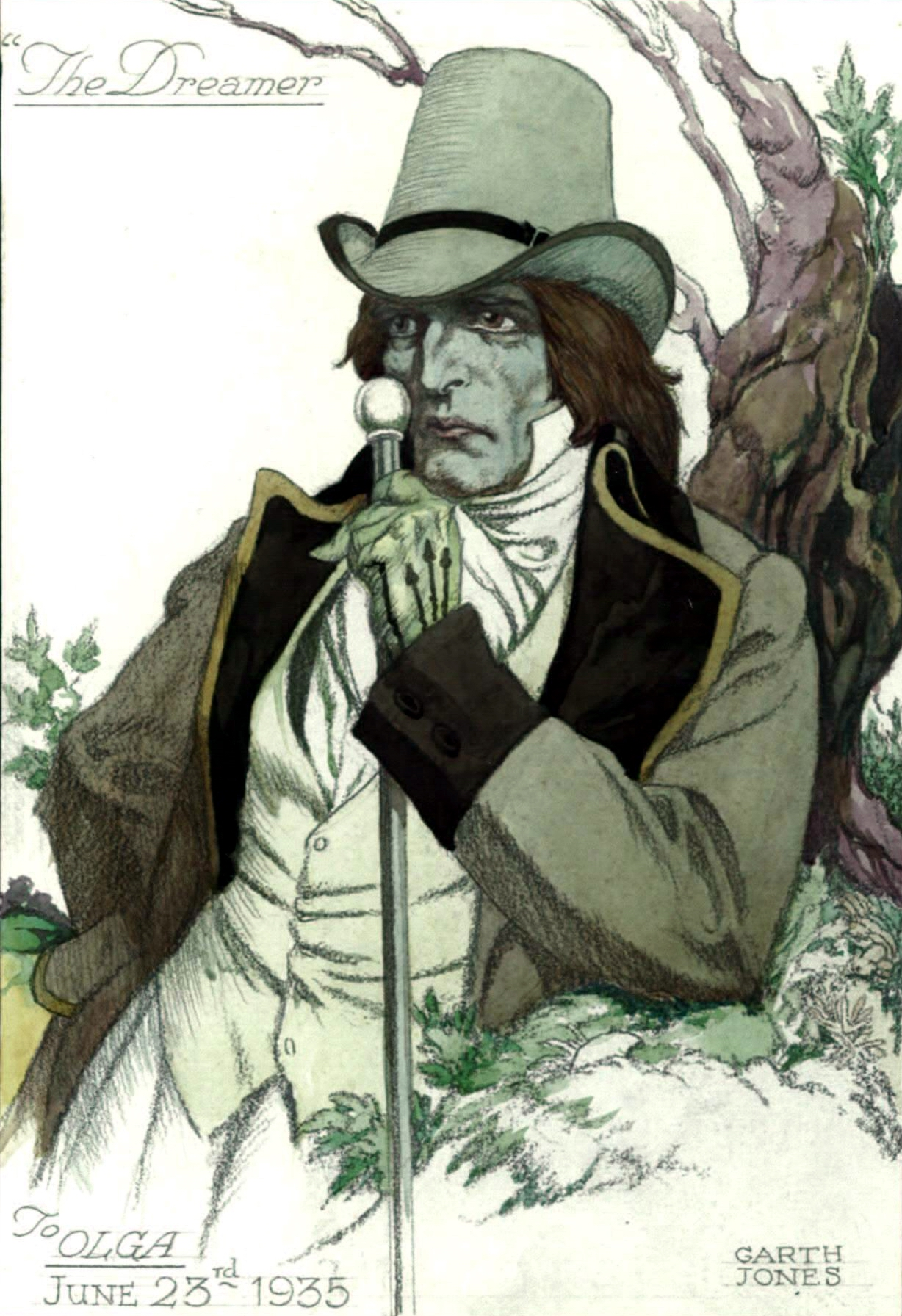
To Olga 23 June 1935, The Dreamer

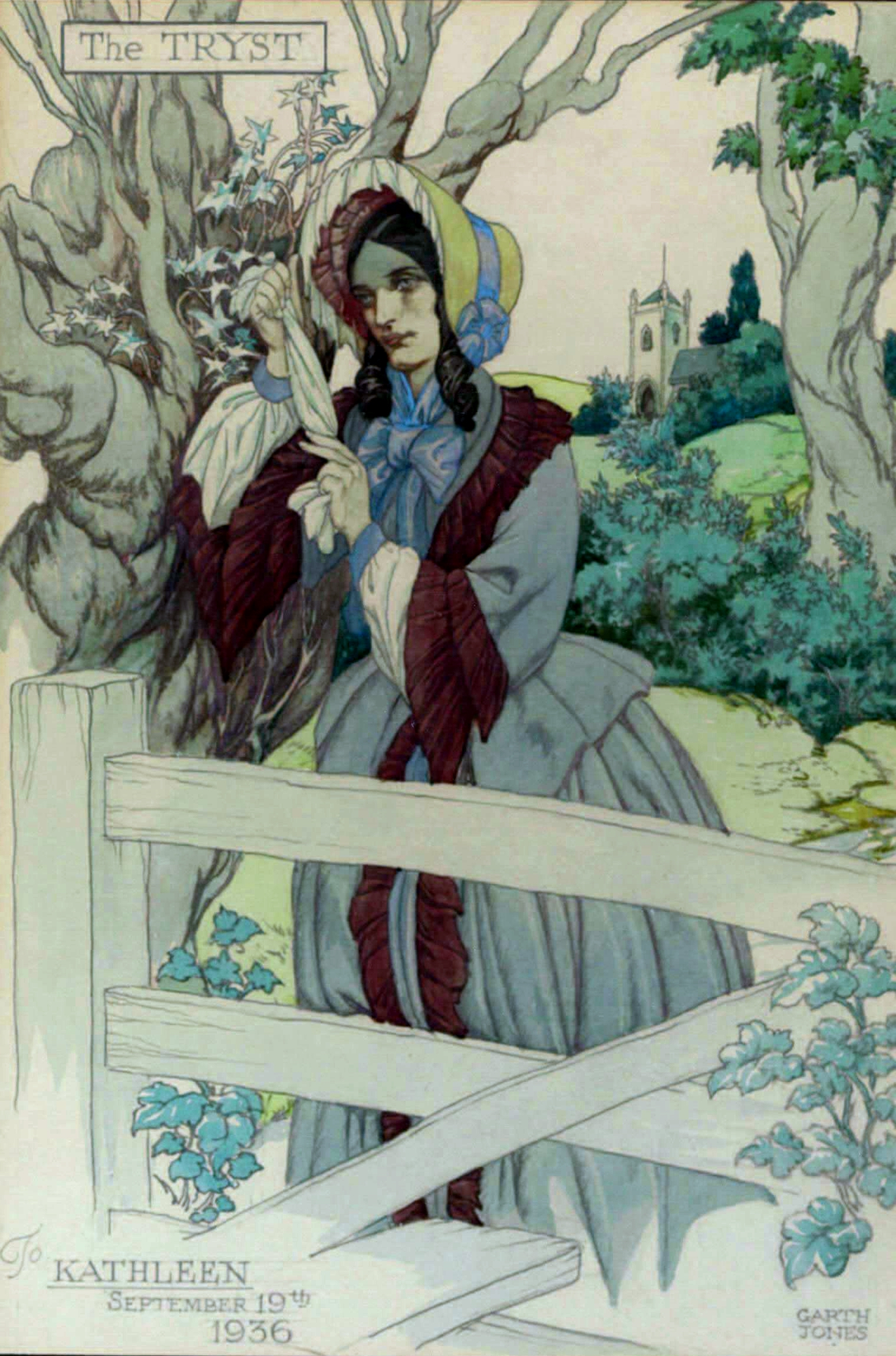
To Kathleen 19 September 1936, The Tryst

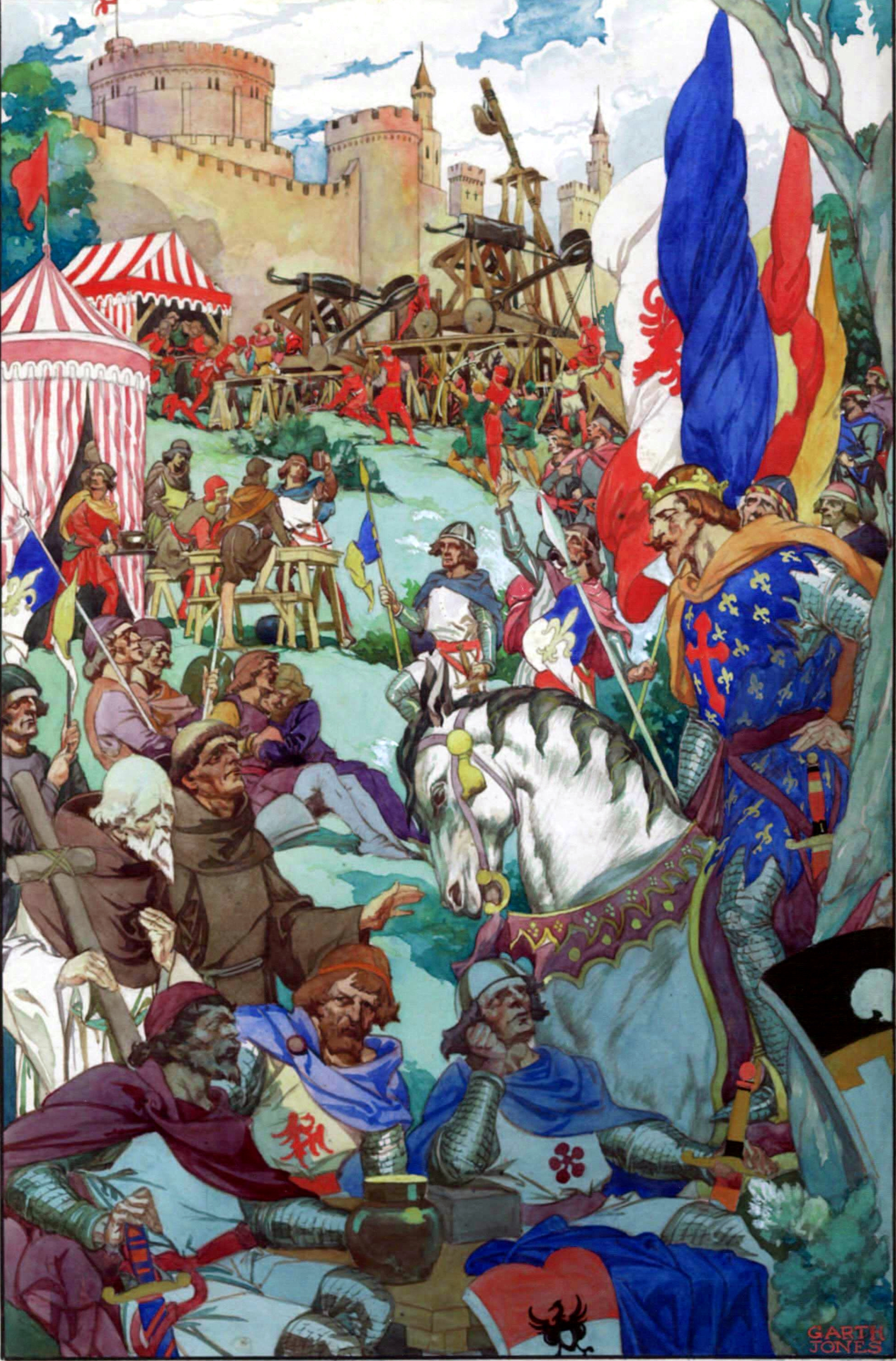
Windsor besieged and held for King John A.D.1216

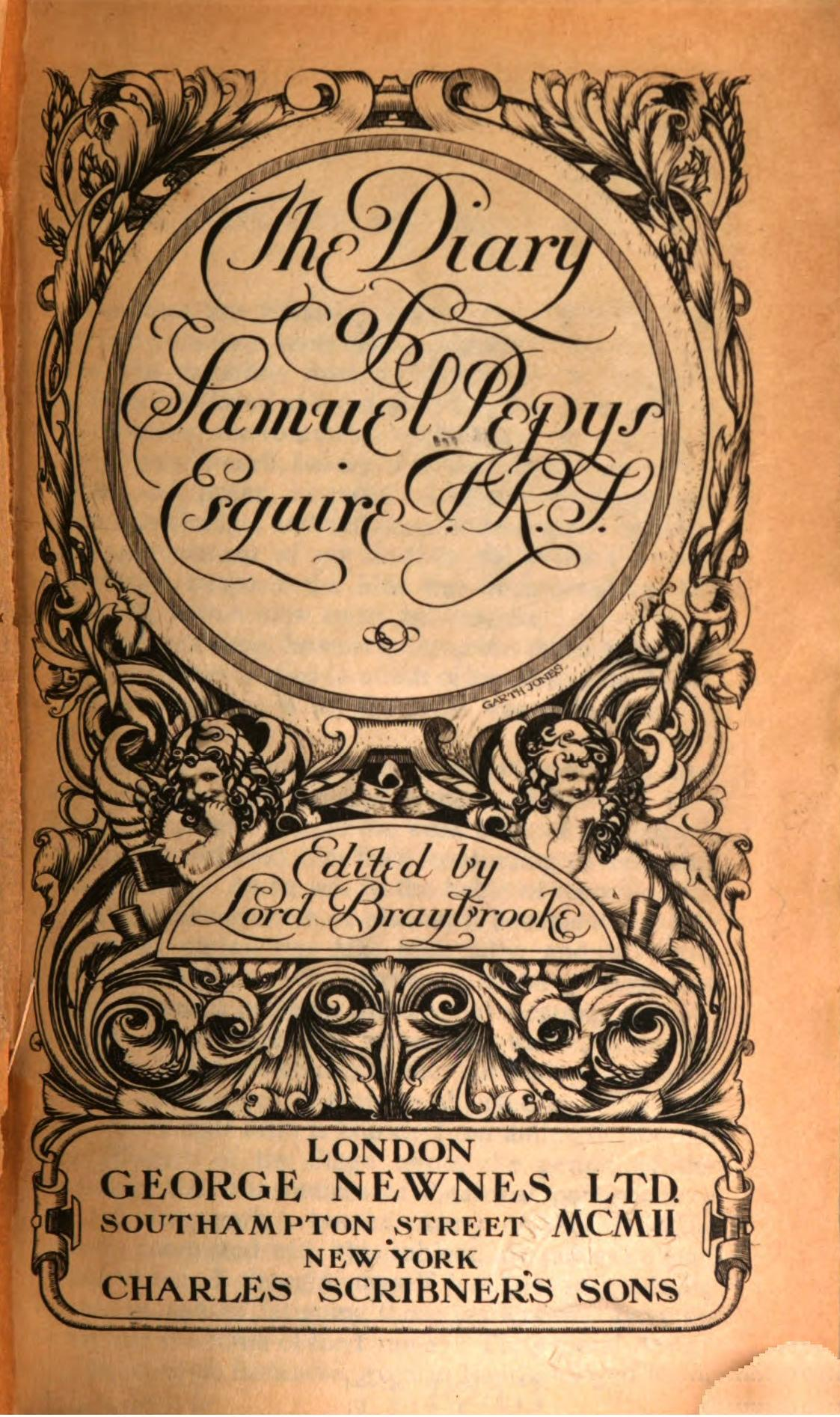
The Diary of Samuel Pepys Esquire, F.R.S.

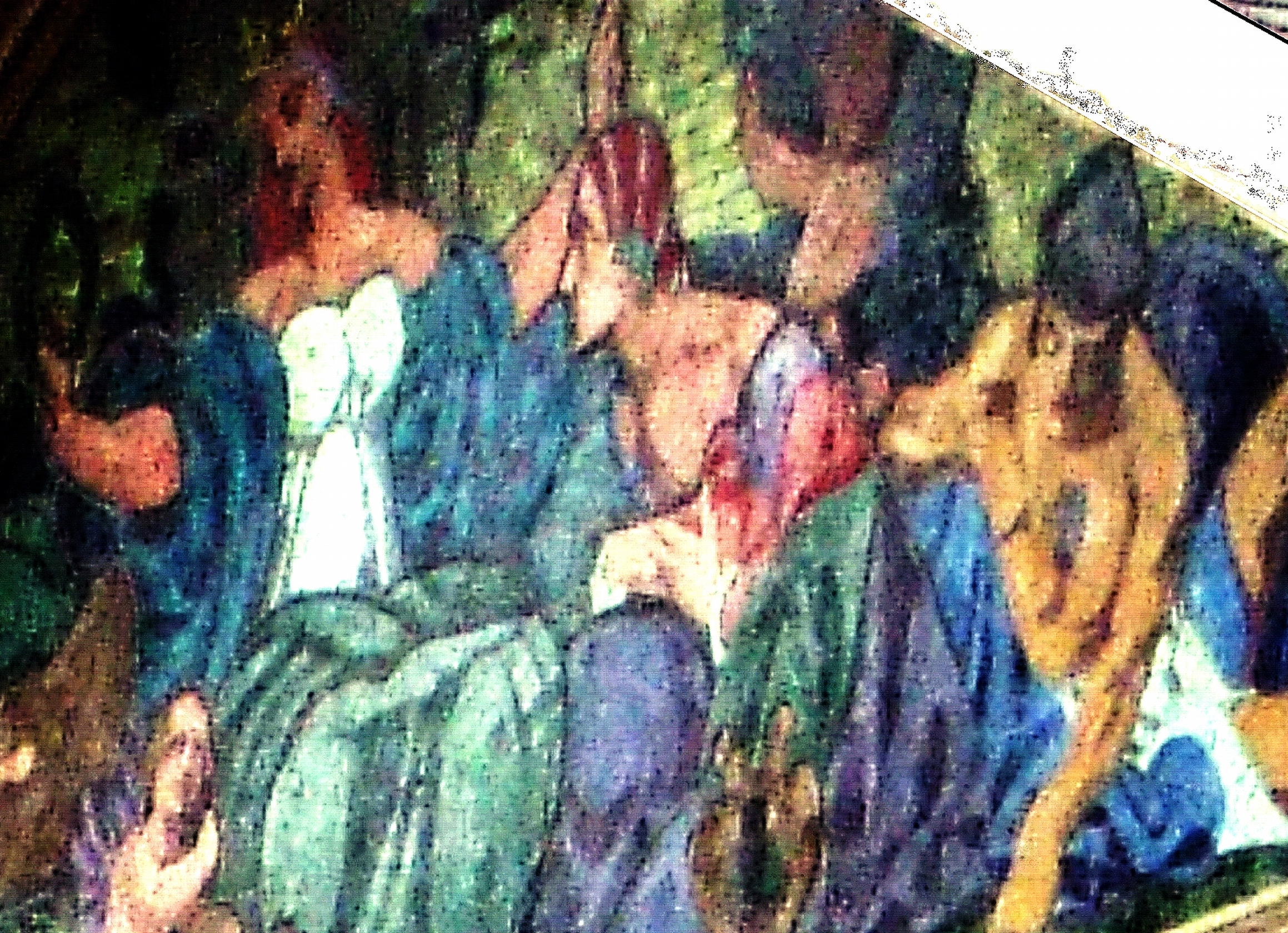
A detail from a mosaic (the triumph of the arts over ignorance) designed by Jones and executed by the Bromsgrove Guild which was incorporated into the pedimented gable of the Hull School of Art (1904), a listed building that still stands on Anlaby Road, Hull.

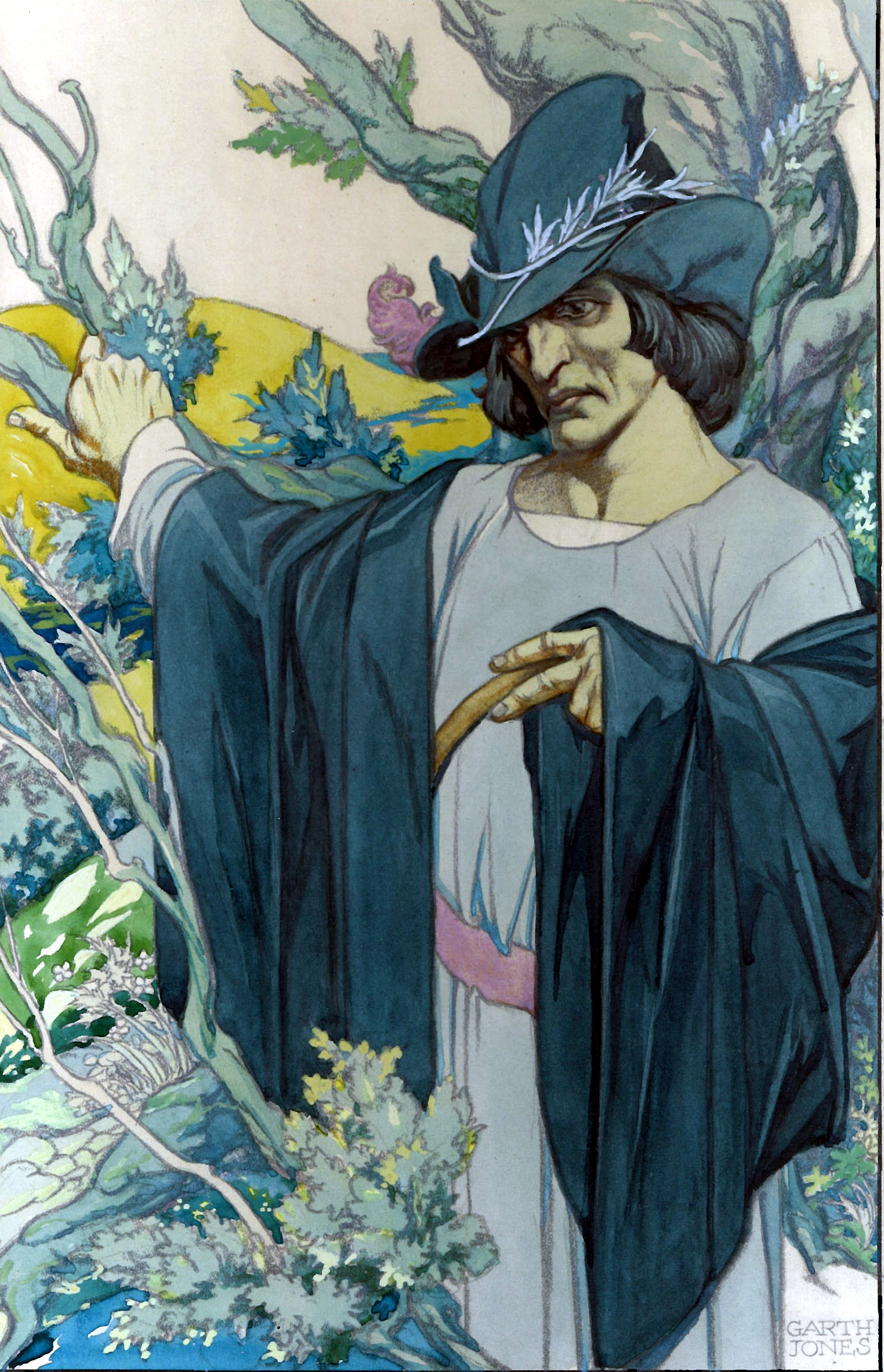
Il Penseroso

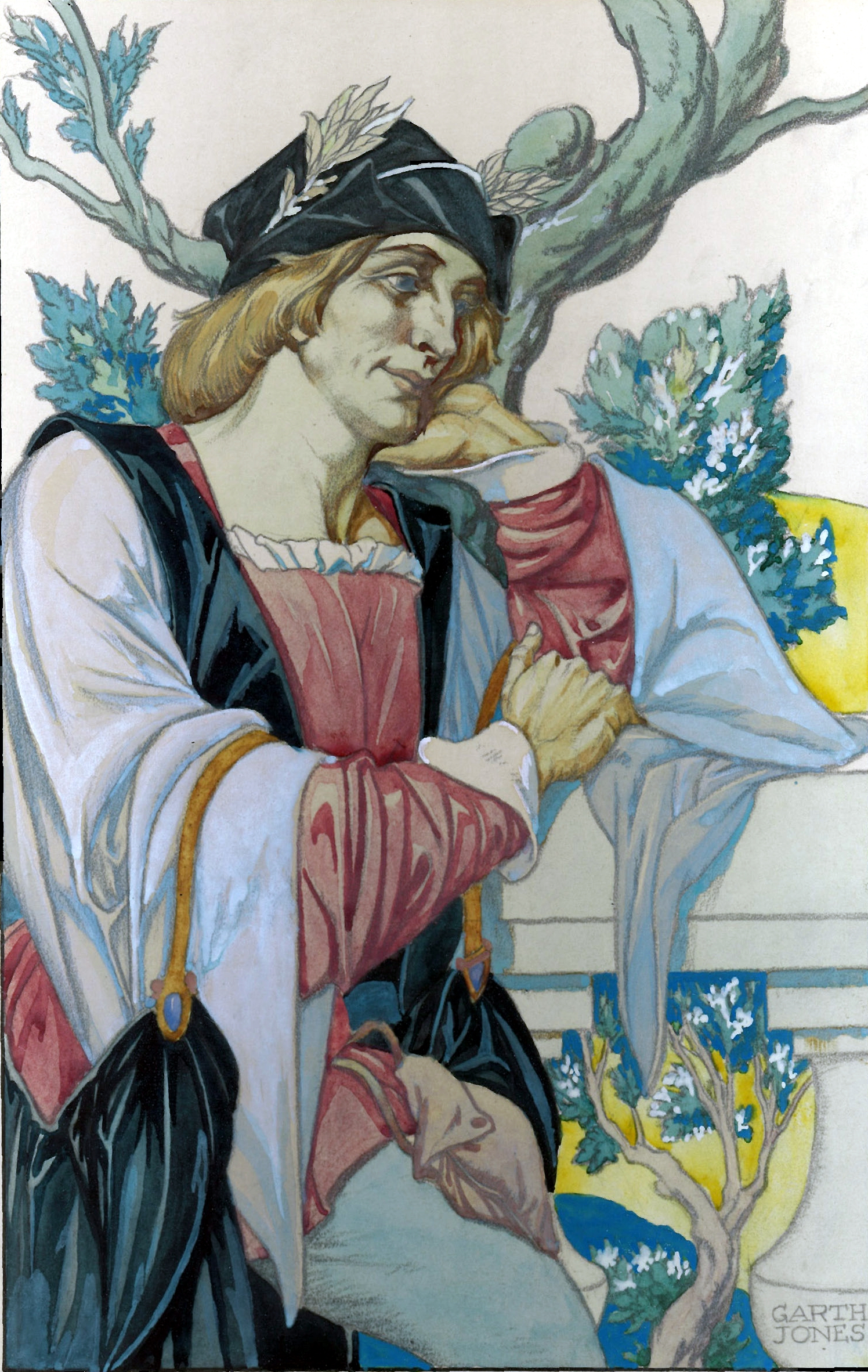
L'Allegro

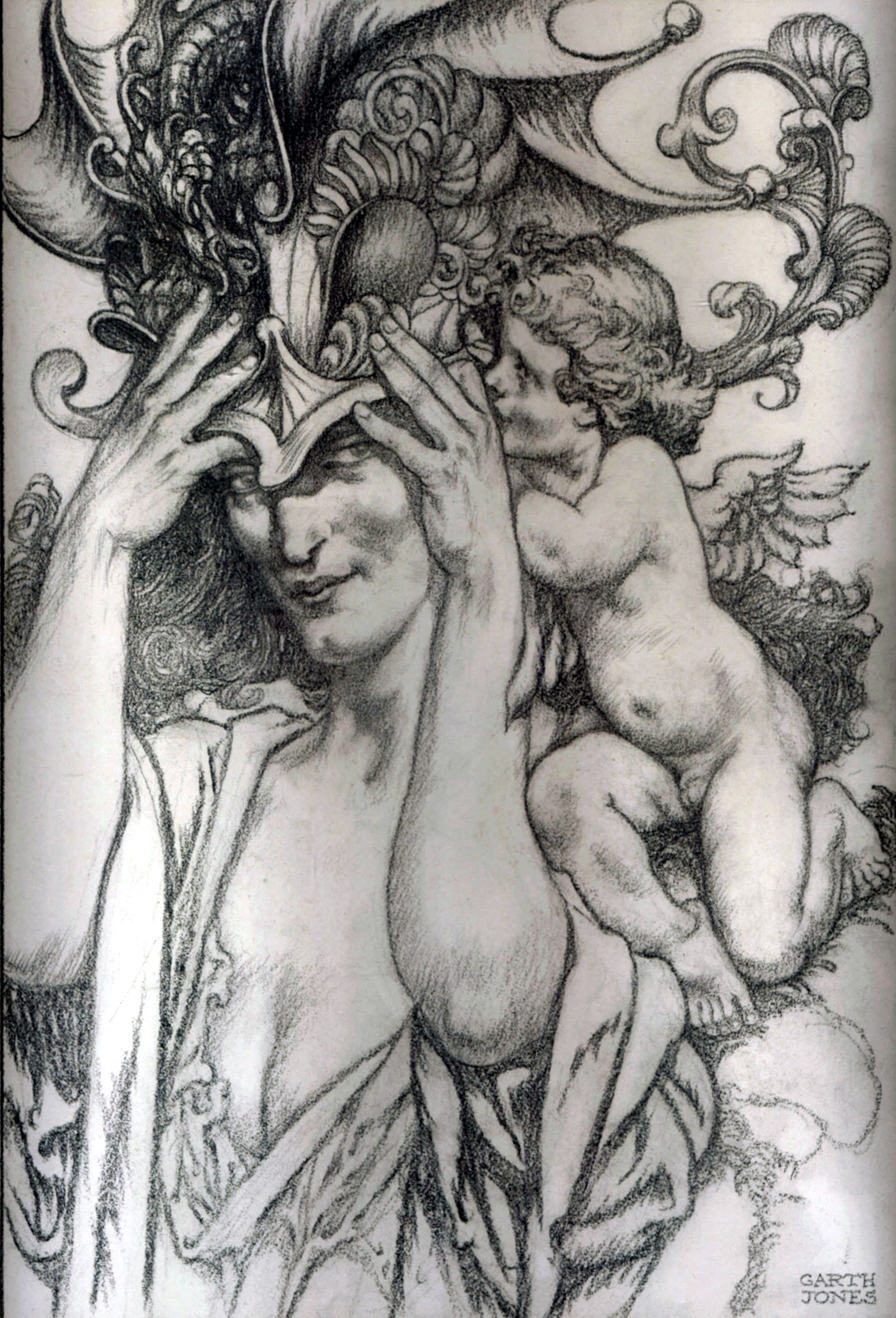
a drawing

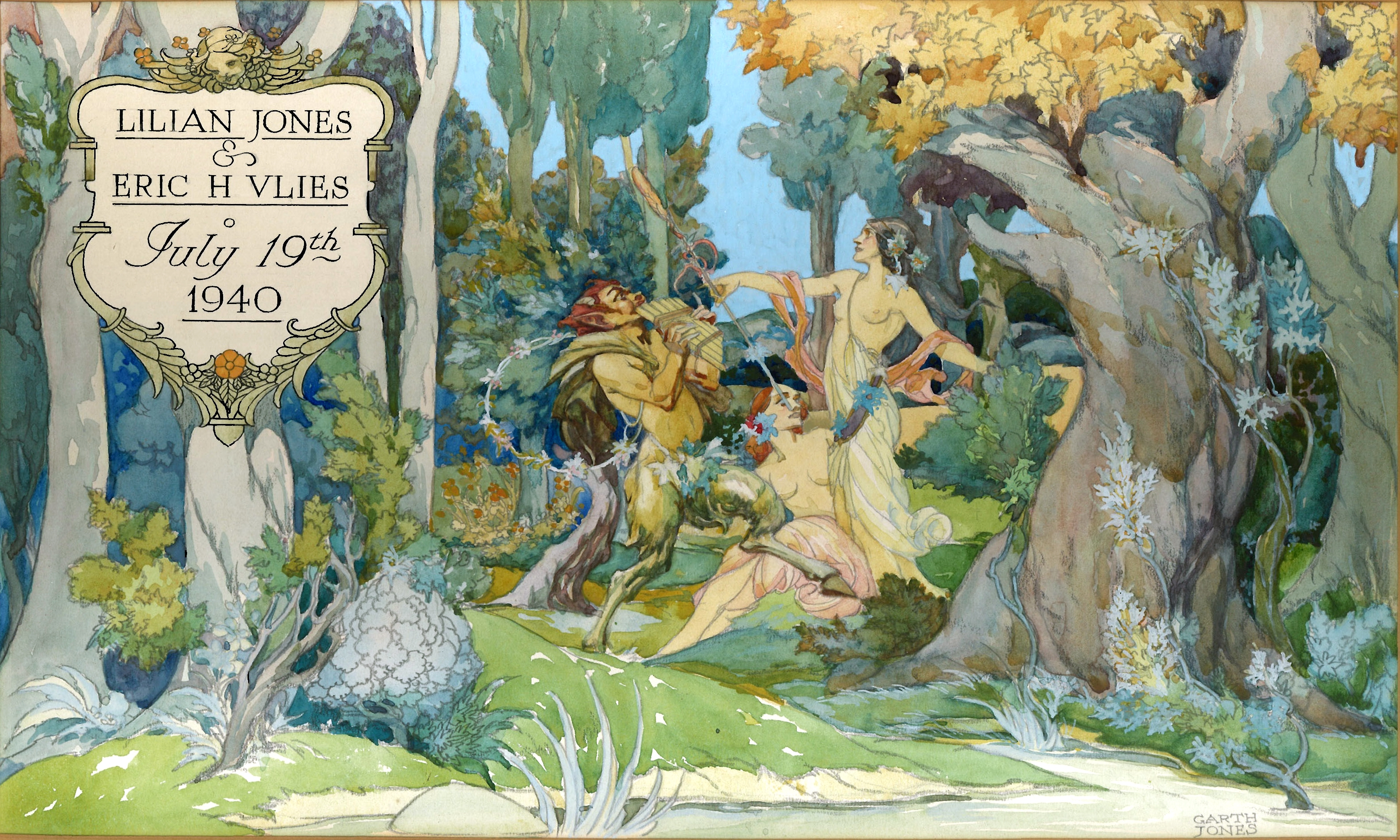
Lilian Jones & Eric H Vlies, 19 July 1940

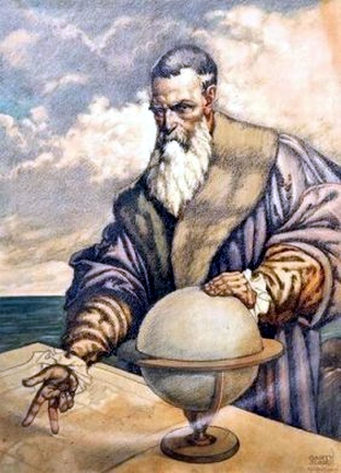
A crayon and watercolour portrait of Gerard Mercator

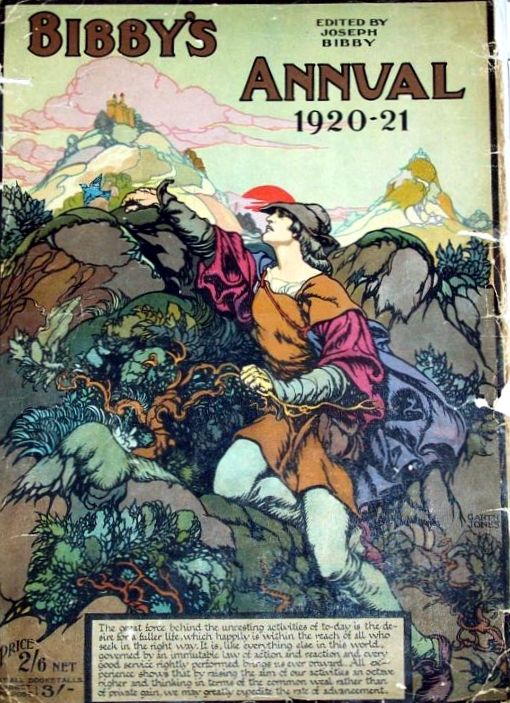
Bibby's Annual 1920–21

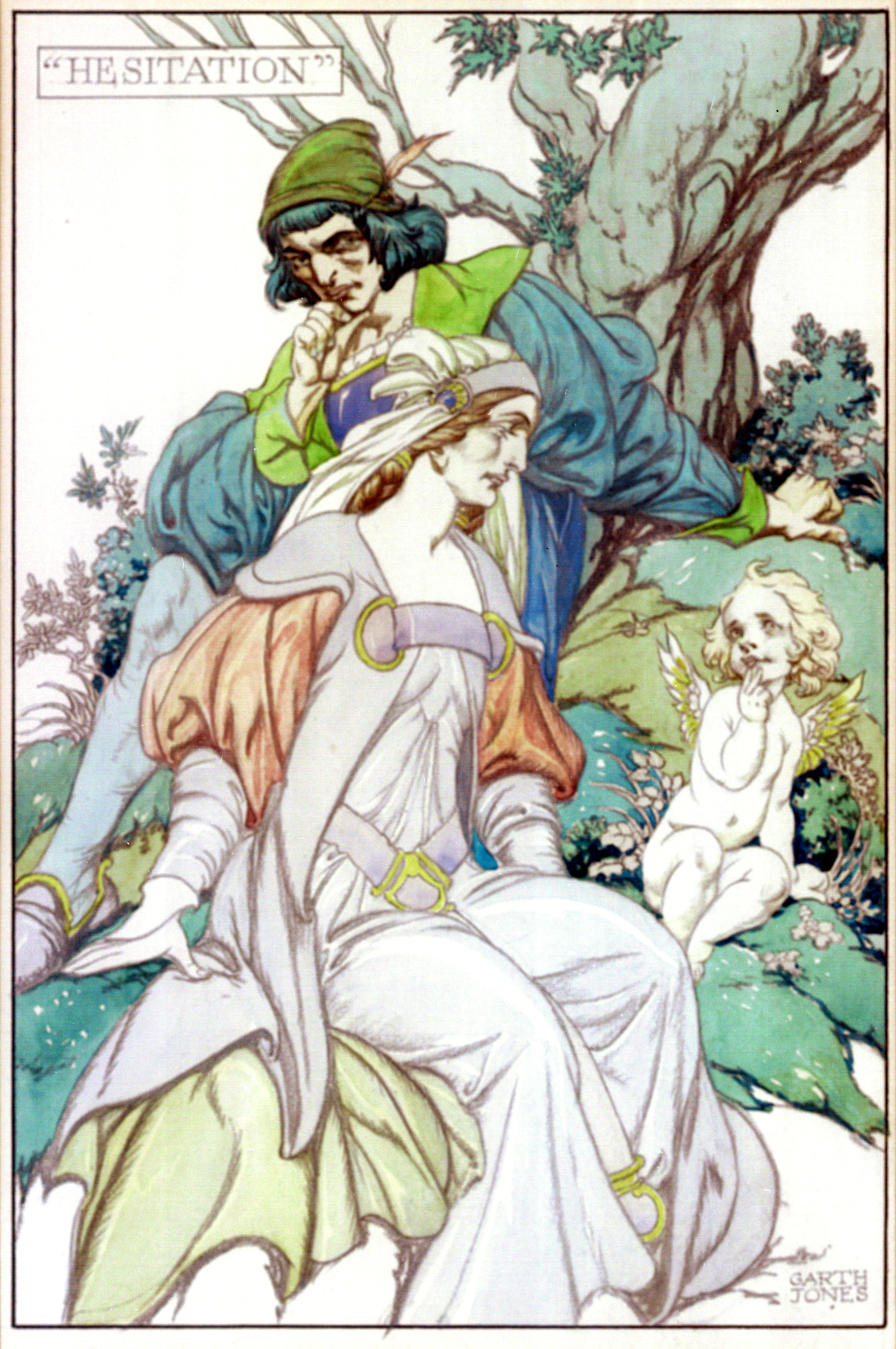
Hesitation

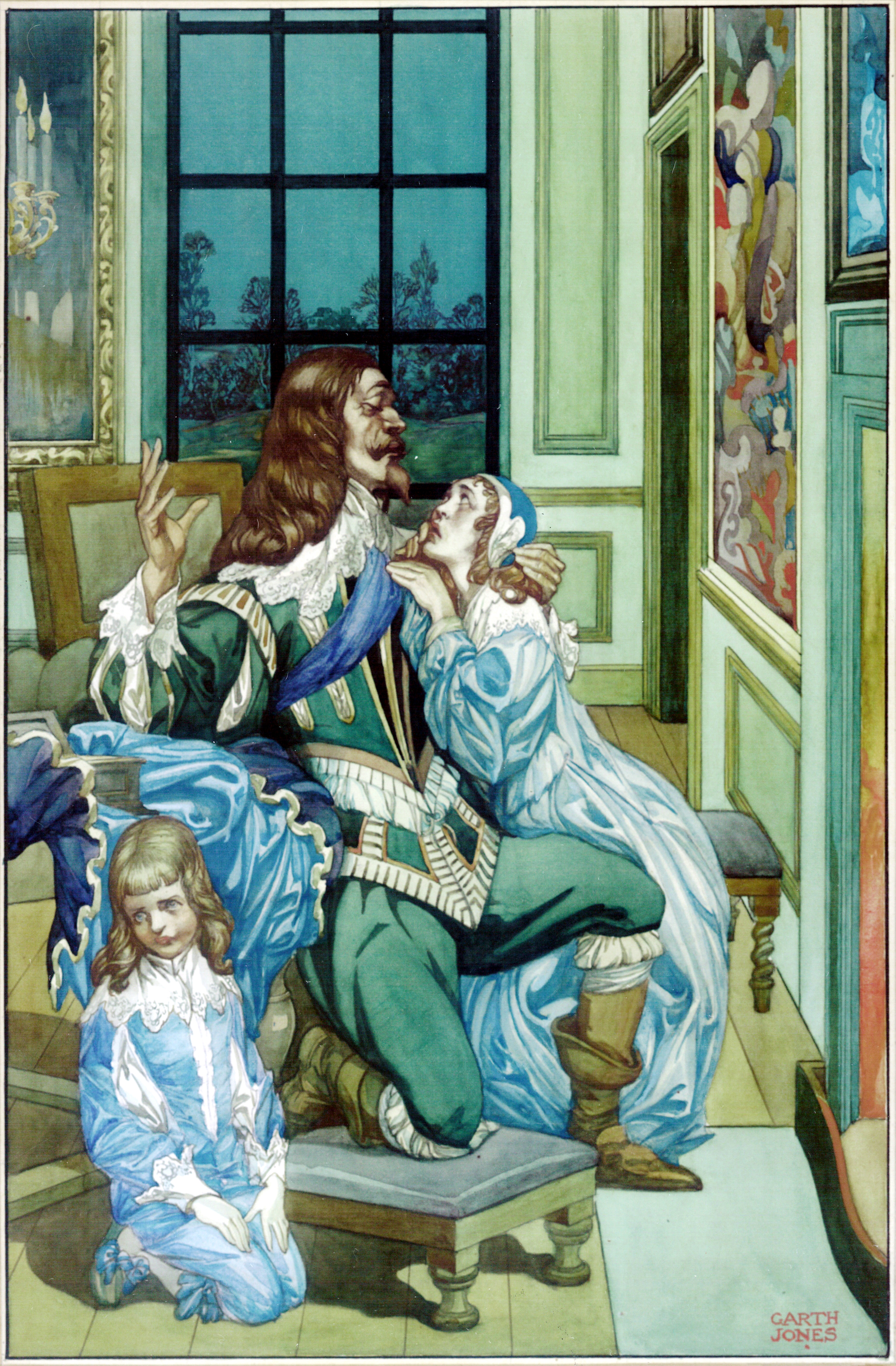
The Last Night of Charles I

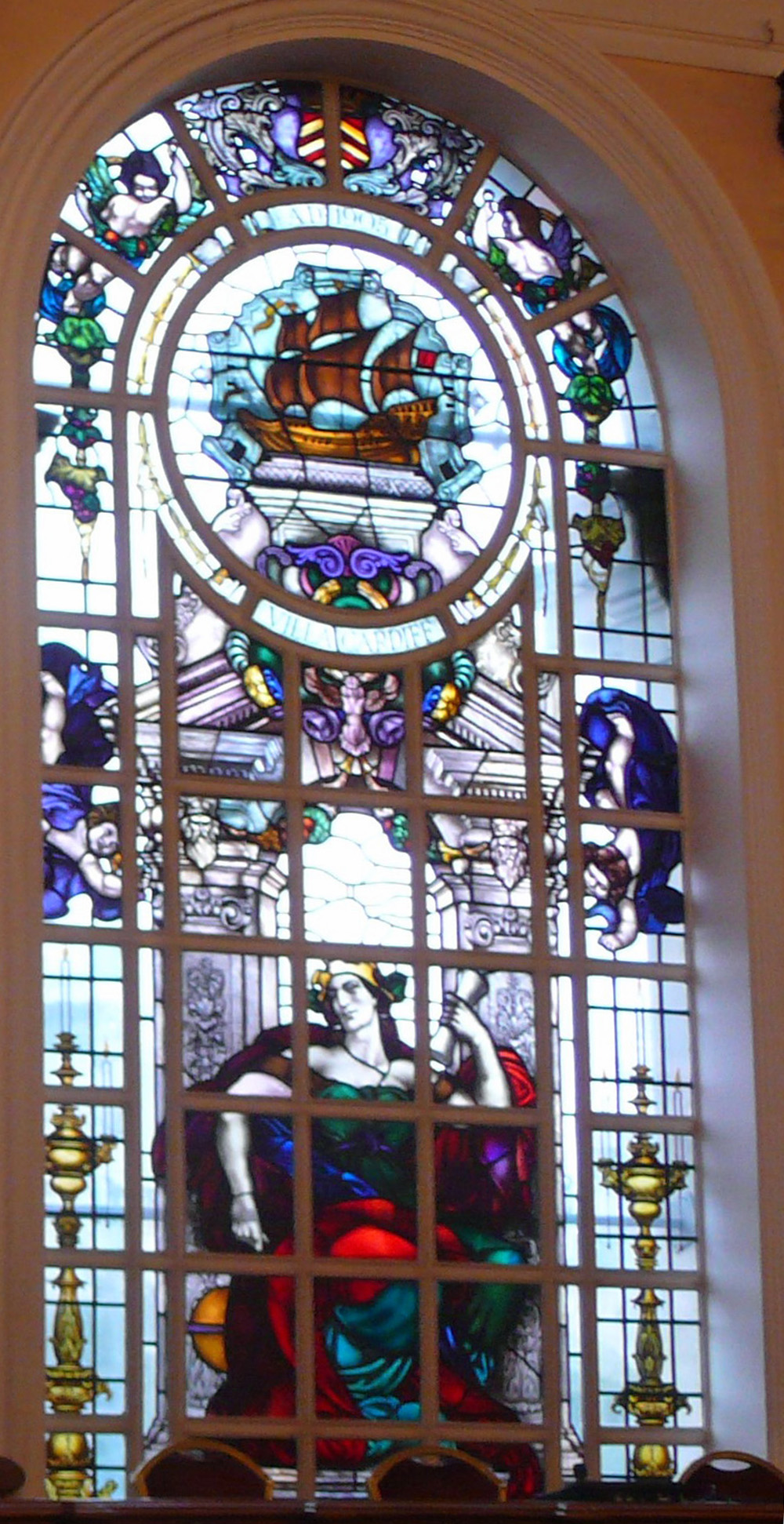
Stained Glass Window in the Council Chamber at Cardiff City Hall

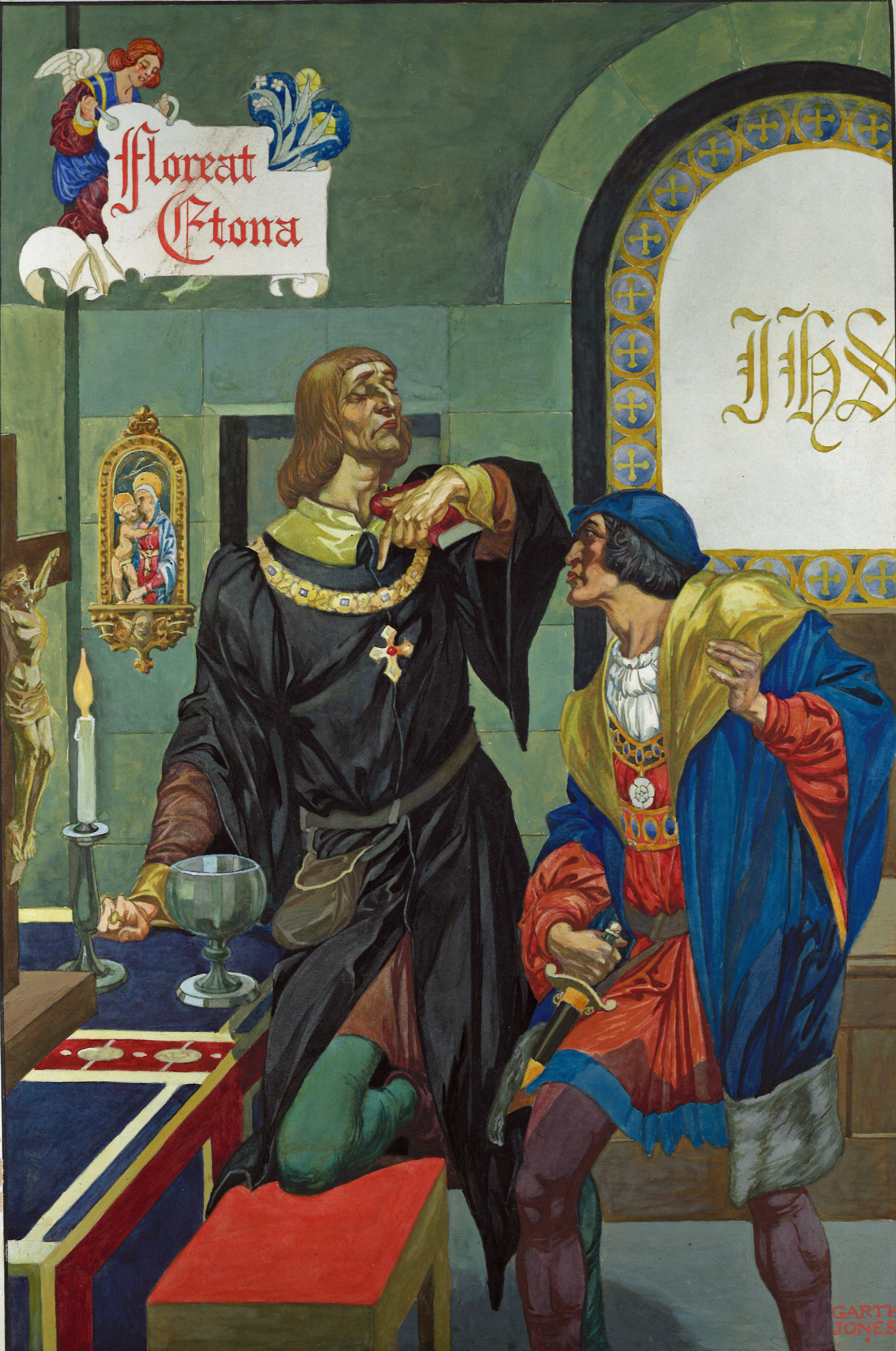
Henry VI comes to his death in The Tower. A.D. 1471
