= Clare Gilbert =

Professor and researcher

- Born: Croydon
- Education: Bristol University
- Known for: Research of visual impairment in children
- Scientific career
- Fields: Ophthalmology
- Workplaces: Bristol Eye Hospital UCL Institute of Ophthalmology London School of Hygiene and Tropical Medicine

Clare Gilbert is a British ophthalmologist, professor and researcher who focuses on blindness in children. She is based at the London School of Hygiene and Tropical Medicine (LSHTM).

== Education and training ==
Gilbert was born in Croydon and educated at Croydon High School for Girls (GPDST). She qualified in medicine at Bristol University in 1976. After qualifying, she worked as a clinical ophthalmologist in Bristol Eye Hospital for 3 years, and then in Leeds and Bradford for 7 years. She then undertook research for MD in surgical retina at the Department of Pathology at the Institute of Ophthalmology (IoO), London (1987–1990). During this time, she took part in a clinical trial of Mectizan for the treatment of onchocerciasis in Sierra Leone.

In 1990, she joined the International Centre for Eye Health (ICEH), Department of Preventive Ophthalmology at the IoO, and in 1995 completed an MSc in Epidemiology at LSHTM. In 2002 the group moved to the London School of Hygiene & Tropical Medicine. Gilbert co-directed ICEH between 2002 and 2020. Gilbert was appointed as Professor of International Eye Health in 2008.

== Research ==
Her research focus is on the frequency, causes, and control of blinding eye diseases in children in low and middle-income countries; glaucoma in Africa, and integrating primary eye care for children into primary health care in Africa.

One of Gilbert's contributions was to develop a system for classifying the causes of blindness in children in collaboration with the World Health Organization (WHO). Data collected by examining numerous blind children in Latin America, Africa and Asia showed how the major causes vary by region, which led to the control of blindness in children being one of the priorities of the global strategy of WHO and the International Agency for the Prevention of Blindness (IAPB), the VISION 2020 - the Right to Sight strategy, as well as the development and planning of eye care programs for children in Africa, Asia, and Latin America.

Gilbert has also undertaken research on retinopathy of prematurity (ROP), a blinding eye condition that can affect infants born preterm. Cataracts in children and refractive errors are other areas of research interest.

Other areas of Gilbert's research include national population-based surveys of blindness and visual impairment in Pakistan, Nigeria, and Sri Lanka, glaucoma, and school eye health.

Gilbert has published over 400 papers in peer-reviewed journals and has written 27 book chapters. She has also supervised and examined 15 Ph.D./MD students.

== Teaching ==
Gilbert has taught at the IoO and on the Masters in Public Health for Eye Care at the LSHTH.(https://www.lshtm.ac.uk/study/courses/masters-degrees/public-health-eye-care) She teaches on the Diploma in Tropical Medicine and Hygiene, and has contributed to several massive online open-access courses (MOOC), including one on ROP.(https://www.futurelearn.com/courses/retinopathy-of-prematurity-practical-approaches-to-prevent-blindness)

== Technical advisor ==
Gilbert has provided technical/scientific advice to a number of organisations, including the WHO; USAID's Child Blindness Program; the International Pediatric Ophthalmology and Strabismus Council; the School Eye Health Rapid Assessment project, USAID; iHOPE, Welcome Trust, India; Velux Stiftung, Switzerland; Sightsavers; and the Vision Impact Institute. She has been involved with a number of working groups for the IAPB and led the development of school eye health guidelines for low and middle-income countries.

Between 2012 and 2019 Gilbert led a large-scale projects for ROP and for diabetic retinopathy in India, supported by the Queen Elizabeth Diamond Jubilee Trust and Standard Chartered Bank's Seeing is Believing program.

== Awards ==
- Honorary Fellow, West African College of Surgeons, 2004
- Outstanding Contribution, International Agency for the Prevention of Blindness, 2004
- The Pfizer Visiting Professor Award, 2010
- International Prevention of Blindness Award, American Academy of Ophthalmology, 2011
- Pisart Vision Award, Lighthouse International, 2012
- L’Occitane Sight Award, L’Occitane Foundation, 2013
- Jules Francois Golden Award, International Council of Ophthalmology, 2016
- Lifetime Achievement Award, Royal National Institute for Blind People, 2017
- Barrie Jones Lecture and Award, Royal College of Ophthalmologists, 2018
- SPROP Prevention of Blindness Award, Sociedad Panamericana de Retinopatía del Prematuro, 2019
- 2020 Power List - Top 100, The Ophthalmologist, 2020
- Vision Excellence Award, International Agency for the Prevention of Blindness, 2020
- Honorary Fellowship, Royal College of Ophthalmologists, 2021
- 2021 Power List - Top 100 Women in Ophthalmology, The Ophthalmologist, 2021
