= William Theodore Peters =

American actor and poet (1862–1905)

William Theodore Peters (April 6, 1862 – April 18, 1905 in Paris) was an American poet and actor.

Peters was born in Brooklyn, New York, to Dr DeWitt Clinton Peters Sr (1829–1876), a lieutenant colonel, assistant surgeon on United States Army Medical Staff, and his wife Emily G. Peters (née Stoutenborough). His brother was the accomplished artist DeWitt Clinton Peters Jr.

Associated with 1890s decadence, Will Peters was a friend of Ernest Dowson, who dedicated a poem to him: "To William Theodore Peters on His Renaissance Cloak". In October 1892, he commissioned Dowson to write the play that would ultimately become The Pierrot of the Minute, for him to act in. Peters also authored an epilogue to the play, spoken by the character of Pierrot. This was included in Peters' book of verse, Posies Out of Rings and Other Conceits, a "quaint little salmon pink volume", which was published by John Lane and the Bodley Head in 1896. Peters also wrote a children's book, The Children of the Week, illustrated by the accomplished artist Clinton Peters, published in 1886 by Dodd, Mead, & Co.

Peters's other book of note was 1894's The Tournament of Love, published by Brentano's, with drawings by Alfred Garth Jones. Later, music was composed for the piece by Noel Johnson. The work was performed at the Théâtre d'Application, 18 rue St. Lazare, on May 8, 1894, with Peters playing the part of the troubadour Betrand de Roaix.

While he was resident in Paris in the mid-1890s Peters contributed his characteristic light verse to a new artistic literary magazine titled '''The Quartier Latin''' (1896-99). The magazine was published by the American Art Association and intended to serve the artistic American colony in Paris.

Throughout the 1890s Peters was described as a permanent guest of the Rhymers' Club.

== Death ==
Peters died on April 18, 1905 at 29, rue Maurepas, Versailles, in Paris. According to records he was 43 years of age. It has been suggested that Peters died of starvation, while some sources simply report that he died in poverty. Contemporary newspapers, however, reported that Peters was dying of, and eventually died from, Bright's Disease.

== Bibliography ==
- Tutti - Frutti: A Book of Child Songs (1881) Co-authored with Laura Ledyard.
- The Children of the Week, being the honest and only authentic account of certain stories, as related by the Red Indian, to Alexander Selkirk, Jr. (1886)
- The Tournament of Love (1894)
- Posies Out of Rings, and Other Conceits (1896)
- Arrière-Pensées (Afterthoughts): A Little Book of Merry Wisdom (1901)
