= Croydon High School =

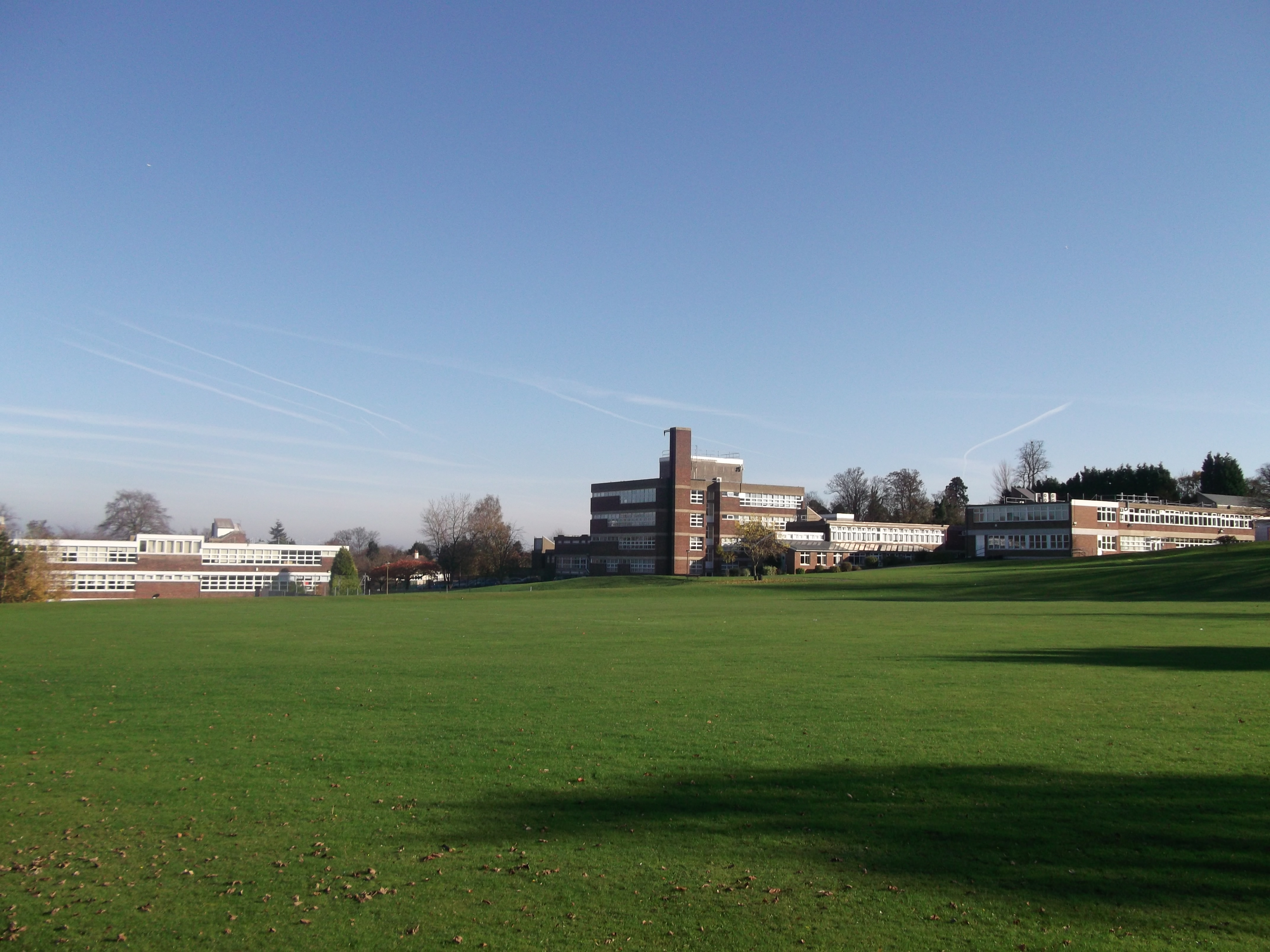
- Croydon High School and playing fields

Location
- Old Farleigh Road; South Croydon, Greater London, CR2 8YB; England; 51.3411°N 0.0615°W

Information
- Type: Private day school
- Motto: May Her Character and Talents Inspire Others
- Established: 1874
- Local authority: Croydon
- Department for Education URN: 101845 Tables
- Headmistress: Ms A Davies
- Gender: Girls
- Age: 3 to 18
- Enrolment: 700~
- Colour: Blue
- Website: http://www.croydonhigh.gdst.net/

Croydon High School is a private day school for girls located near Croydon, London, England. It is one of the original schools founded by the Girls' Day School Trust.

== History ==
The school was founded in 1874 in Wellesley Road just north of the centre of Croydon, and the first Headmistress was Dorinda Neligan. The school was evacuated to Bradden, Northamptonshire during World War II. The present building in Old Farleigh Road, Selsdon, South Croydon, Surrey was opened in 1966. It has been an independent girls school aiming to educate young girls since its foundation in 1874.

== Weekend programmes ==
The Japanese Saturday School of London, a weekend Japanese programme, uses the Girls' School as its Croydon Campus (クロイドン校舎 Kuroidon Kōsha).

== Notable former pupils ==
- Mary Baines (1932–2020), palliative care physician
- Dame Lilian Braithwaite DBE (1873–1948), actress (née Florence Lilian Braithwaite)
- Judy Buxton (b. 1949), actress
- Elsa Gye (1881–1943), suffragette organiser with the Women's Social and Political Union
- Helen Chadwick (1953-1996), artist
- Catherine Christian (1901–1985), novelist and supporter of the Girl Guide movement
- Dame Jane Drew DBE (1911–1996), architect and town planner (née Joyce Beverly Drew)
- Jacqueline du Pré OBE (1945–1987), musician, cellist
- Josephine Elder (1895–1988), children's author (née Olive Gwendoline Potter)
- Clare Gilbert, professor and researcher who focuses on blindness in children
- Jessie Gilbert (1987–2006), chess player
- Barbara Jones (1912–1978), artist, writer and mural painter
- Yootha Joyce (b. 1927), actress
- Elizabeth Laird (b. 1943), children's author
- Kate Evelyn Luard (1872-1962) Decorated 1st World War nurse
- Sandra Howard (b. 1940), novelist, former model (under the name Sandra Paul), and wife of Michael Howard
- Perin Jamsetjee Mistri (1913–1989), Indian architect
- Mary Plumstead (1905-1980)
- Susanna Reid (b. 1970), Good Morning Britain presenter
- Anneka Rice (b. 1958), TV presenter (née Anne Rice)
- Dame Marion Roe DBE (b. 1936), Conservative politician
- Wendy Savage (b. 1935), obstetrician and gynaecologist
- Hannah Schmitz (b. 1985), Principal Strategy Engineer at Formula One team Oracle Red Bull Racing
- Henderina Klaassen Scott (1862–1929), pioneer of time lapse photography in botany
- Beatrice Seear, Baroness Seear (1913–1997), known as Nancy Seear, social scientist and politician
- Joanna Shapland (b. 1950), criminologist, forensic psychologist, and academic
- Jill Tweedie (1936–1993), novelist and journalist
- Charlotte Deane (b. 1975), bioinformatician and Head of the Department of Statistics at the University of Oxford
- Gabrielle Bertin, Baroness Bertin (b. 1978), Conservative aide and life peer
- Susan Ma (b. 1988), The Apprentice contestant and founder of Tropic Skincare
- Kathryn Whaler OBE (b. 1956), Professor of geophysics at the University of Edinburgh, former president of the Royal Astronomical Society
- Susan Wrigglesworth(1954-1996), British fencer who competed at the 1972, 1976 and 1980 Summer Olympics

== Headmistresses ==
Past headmistresses

- 1874–1901: Dorinda Neligan (1833–1914)
- 1902–1924: Marion Leahy
- 1925 (Spring term): Eleanor Roper (acting headmistress)
- 1925–1939: Ella Ransford
- 1939–1960: Margaret F. Adams
- 1960–1974: Elsa Cameron
- 1974–1979: Agnes McMaster
- 1979–1990: Agnes Mark
- 1990–1997: Pauline Davies
- 1998–2007: Lorna M. Ogilvie
- 2007–2010: Zelma Braganza
- 2010–2016: Debbie Leonard
- 2016–2022: Emma Pattison
- 2022–present: Annabel Davies
