= Mary Plumstead =

English composer and pianist

Mary Frost Plumstead (1905 - 4 May 1980) was an English composer and pianist who is best remembered for her songs. She advocated "self composition," believing that all musicians should compose their own music.

Plumstead was born in Upper Warlingham, Surrey, England. She studied piano at Croydon High School, then earned a Licentiate of the Royal Academy of Music (LRAM) in ear training and sight singing. In 1951, several of her large scale compositions (probably for choir) were performed at the Festival of Britain. In 1953, she accompanied the soprano Rowena Hamer-Jones in a recital at London's Wigmore Hall, which included five songs Plumstead had composed.

Plumstead married an estate agent, and they lived in Devon. Her music was recorded commercially by BMS Records, His Master's Voice (HMV) Records, and Hyper Records. Her compositions were published by Boosey & Hawkes, Chappell and Co. Ltd., Curwen/ Elkin, G. Schirmer Inc., J & W Chester Ltd., Roberton Publications (part of Good Music Publishing) and Schott & Co. Ltd.. Her works, all for voice, include:

- Brother Francis (choir and piano)
- Close Thine Eyes (voice and piano, also arranged for choir; text by King Charles I)
- Down by the Salley Gardens (text by William Butler Yeats)
- Evening Prayer
- Grateful Heart (text by George Herbert)
- Grey Wind (text by Vera Wainwright)
- Ha'nacker Mill (text by Hilaire Belloc)
- He was the One (text by Phyllida Garth)
- Old Fisherman Joe (for two part choir and piano; text by Phyllida Garth)
- On Jacob's Pillow (voice and piano; text by Francis Quarles)
- Piebald Cob in Kensington (baritone and piano)
- Pied Beauty (choir and piano; text by Gerard Manley Hopkins)
- Questions (text by Algernon Charles Swinburne)
- Sigh No More Ladies (voice and piano; text by William Shakespeare)
- Slowly (choir and piano; text by James Reeves)
- Song in the Songless (text by George Meredith)
- Song of the Cross (text by Phyllida Garth)
- Song of the Royal Duchy
- Take, O Take Those Lips Away (text by William Shakespeare)
- They Were All Looking for a King (four part male choir; text by George MacDonald)
- Two by Two (choir; text by Mortimer Durand)
